= Outline of Russia =

Country in Eurasia

The Flag of Russia

The Coat of arms of Russia

Recognized territory is shown in the dark green, disputed territory is shown in the light green Recognized territory is shown in the dark green, disputed territory is shown in the light green

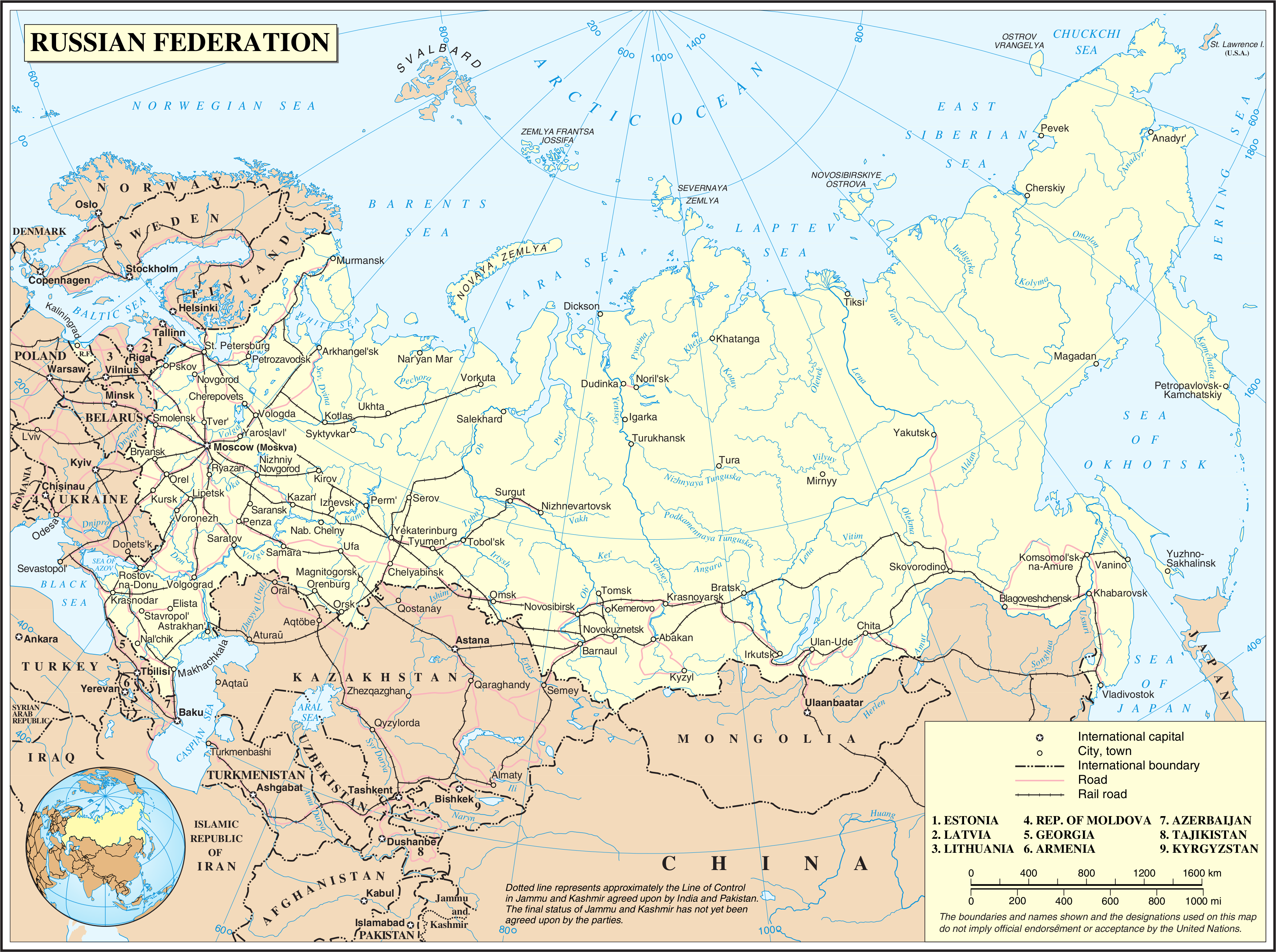
An enlargeable map of the Russian Federation

The following outline is provided as an overview of and topical guide to Russia.

The Russian Federation, commonly known as Russia, is the largest country in the world, covering 17,075,400 square kilometres (6,592,800 sq mi), more than an eighth of the Earth's land area. Russia is a transcontinental country extending across the whole of northern Asia and 40% of Europe; it spans 11 time zones and incorporates a great range of environments and landforms. With 143 million people, Russia is the ninth most populated country. Russia has the world's largest mineral and energy resources, has the world's largest forest reserves, and its lakes contain approximately one-quarter of the Earth's fresh liquid water.

== General reference ==
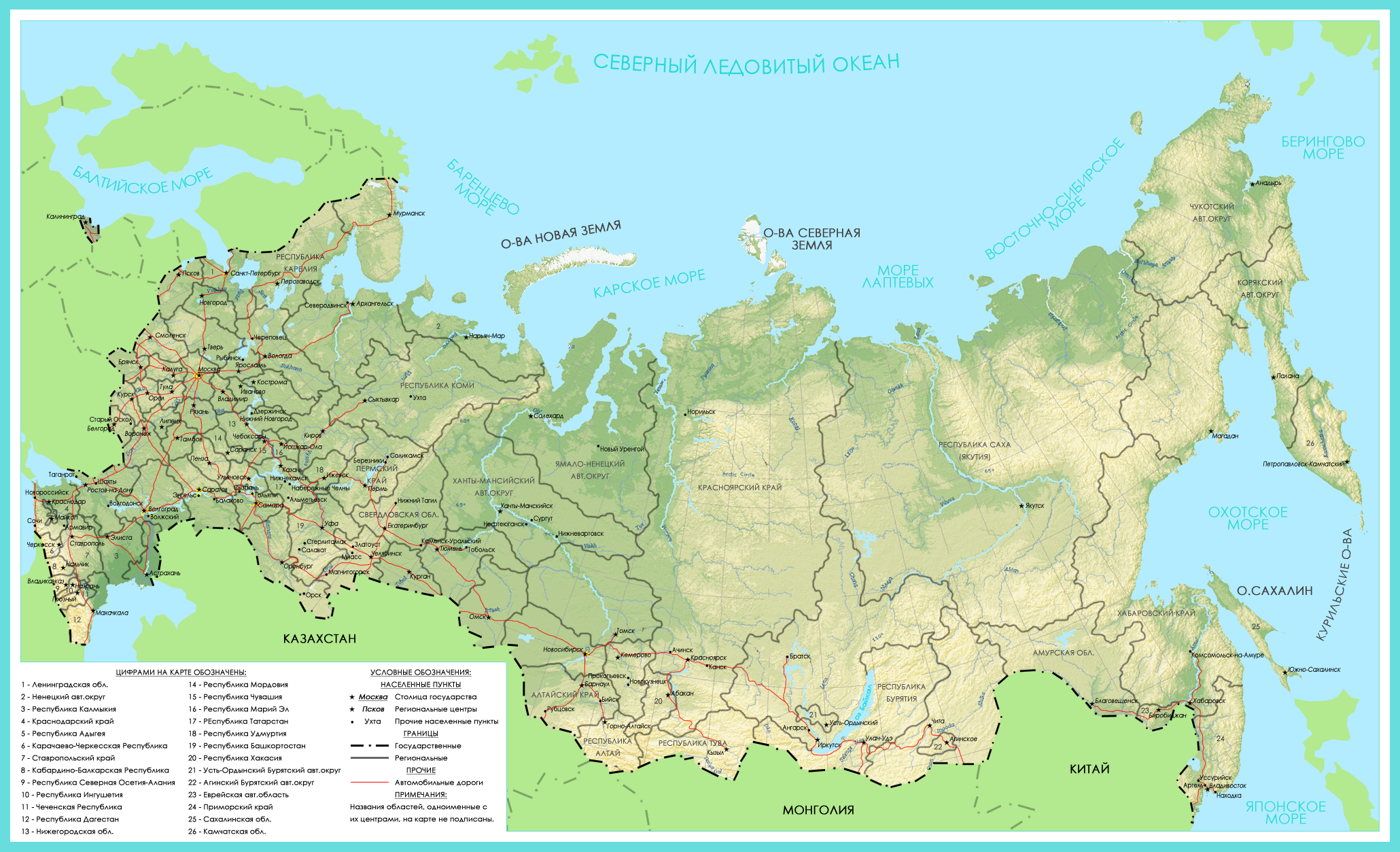
An enlargeable map of Russia

- Pronunciation: /ˈrʌʃə/
- Common English country name: Russia
- Official English country name: The Russian Federation
- Common endonym(s): Россия (Rossiya)
- Official endonym(s): Российская Федерация (Rossiyskaya Federatsiya)
- Adjectival(s): Russian
- Demonym(s):
- Etymology: Name of Russia
- International rankings of Russia
- ISO country codes: RU, RUS, 643
- ISO region codes: See ISO 3166-2:RU
- Internet country code top-level domain: .ru, .su and .рф

== Geography of Russia ==
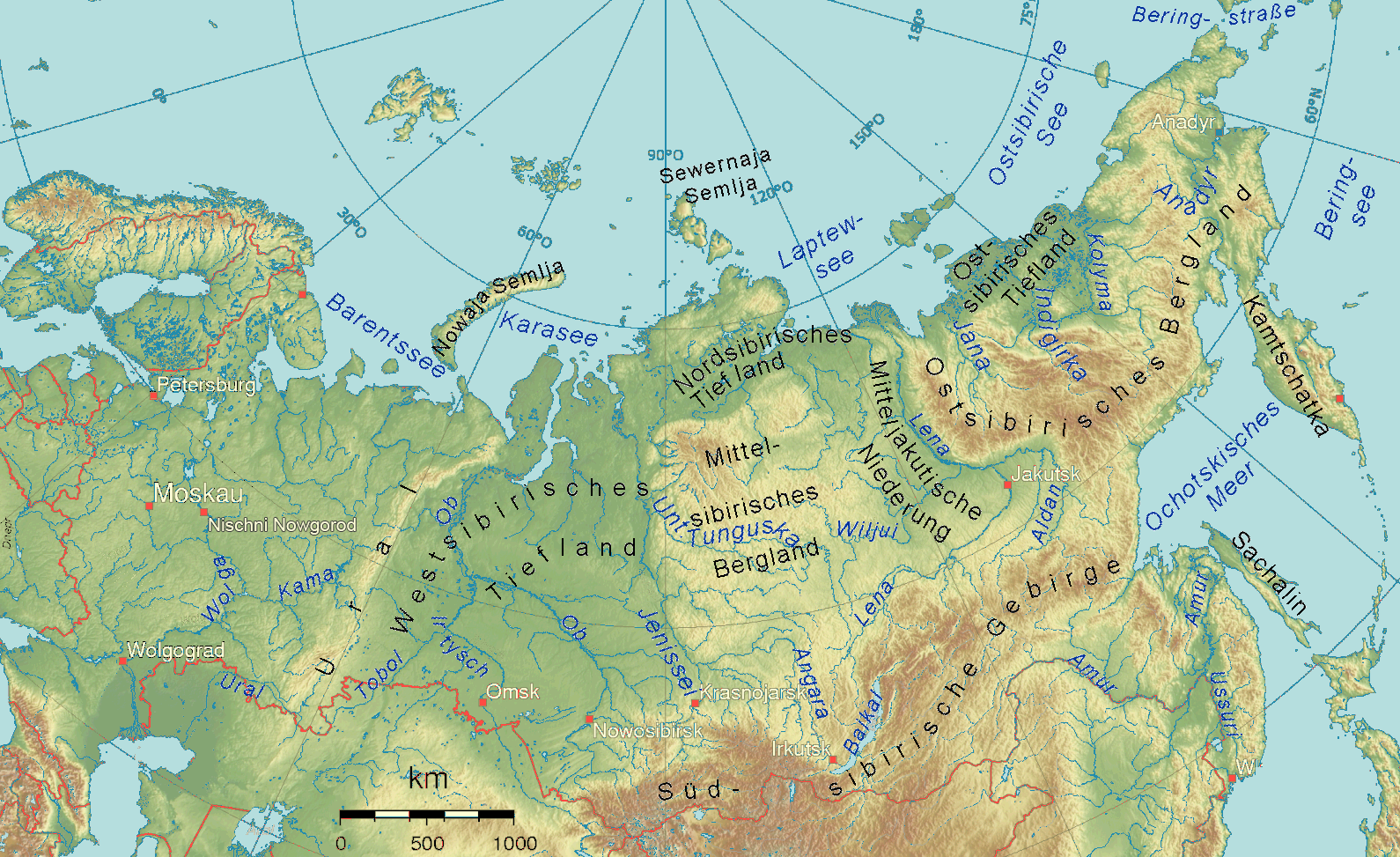
An enlargeable topographic map of Russia

Geography of Russia

- Russia is: a Country
  - Eastern Hemisphere
  - Northern Hemisphere
    - Eurasia
      - Europe
        - Eastern Europe
      - Asia
        - North Asia
  - Time zones:
    - Kaliningrad Time – UTC+02
    - Moscow Time – UTC+03
    - Samara Time – UTC+04
    - Yekaterinburg Time – UTC+05
    - Omsk Time – UTC+06
    - Krasnoyarsk Time – UTC+07
    - Irkutsk Time – UTC+08
    - Yakutsk Time – UTC+9
    - Vladivostok Time – UTC+10
    - Magadan Time – UTC+11
    - Kamchatka Time – UTC+12
  - Extreme points of Russia
    - High: Mount Elbrus 5,642 m (18,510 ft) – highest point in Europe
    - Low: Caspian Sea −28 m (−92 ft) – lowest point in Europe
  - Land boundaries: 20,242 km (12,578 mi)

Kazakhstan 6,846 km (4,254 mi)
China 3,645 km (2,265 mi)
Mongolia 3,441 km (2,138 mi)
Ukraine 1,576 km (979 mi)
Finland 1,313 km (816 mi)
Belarus 959 km (596 mi)
Georgia 723 km (449 mi), including:

Abkhazia 255 km (158 mi)
South Ossetia 70 km (43 mi)

Poland 432 km (268 mi)
Latvia 292 km (181 mi)
Estonia 290 km (180 mi)
Azerbaijan 284 km (176 mi)
Lithuania 227 km (141 mi)
Norway 196 km (122 mi)
North Korea 18 km (11 mi)

- Coastline: 37,653 km (23,396 mi)

- Population of Russia: 142,942,000 people (2010 census) – 8th most populous country
- Area of Russia: 17,075,400 km^{2} (6,592,800 sq mi) – 1st largest country
- Atlas of Russia

Mercator projection distorts Russia's appearance from crescent-like shape (as seen on a globe) into a fish-like or bear-like outline; also making the uninhabited area of Russia (e.g. food-less cold tundra and taiga) look 3-4 times bigger than it already is.

=== Environment of Russia ===
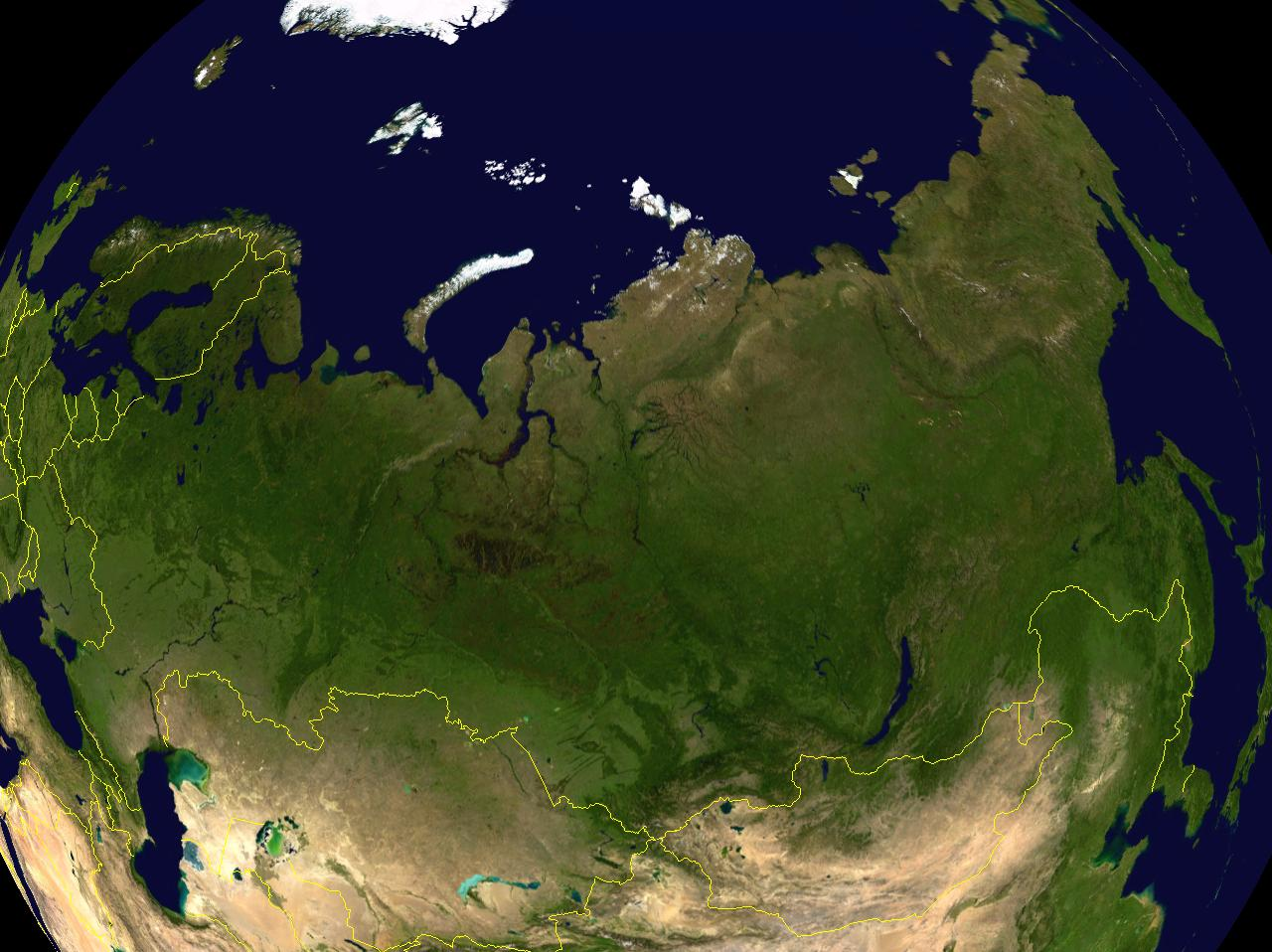
A satellite image of Russia

Environment of Russia

- Climate of Russia
  - Climate change in Russia
- Environmental issues in Russia
  - Climate change in Russia
- Ecoregions in Russia
- Renewable energy in Russia
- Geology of Russia
- National Parks of Russia
- Nature Reserves ("Zapovedniks") in Russia
- Ramsar Wetlands in Russia
- Protected areas of Russia
- Wildlife of Russia
  - Fauna of Russia
    - Birds of Russia
    - Mammals of Russia

==== Geographic features of Russia ====
- Fjords in Russia
- Glaciers of Russia
- Islands of Russia
- Lakes of Russia
  - Caspian Sea (lake with 1.3% salinity, about a third the salinity of seawater. Compare with Great Salt Lake.)
- Mountains of Russia
  - Caucasus Mountains
  - Ural Mountains
  - East Siberian Mountains
  - South Siberian Mountains
  - Volcanoes in Russia
- Plains of Russia
  - West Siberian Plain
  - East Siberian Plain
  - Central Yakutian Plain
- Rivers of Russia
  - Waterfalls of Russia
- Valleys of Russia
- World Heritage Sites in Russia

=== Regions of Russia ===
Economic regions of Russia

- Central Russia
- North Caucasus
- Siberia
- Russian Far East
- Economic regions of Russia

==== Ecoregions of Russia ====
List of ecoregions in Russia

- Ecoregions in Russia

==== Subdivisions of Russia ====
Subdivisions of Russia

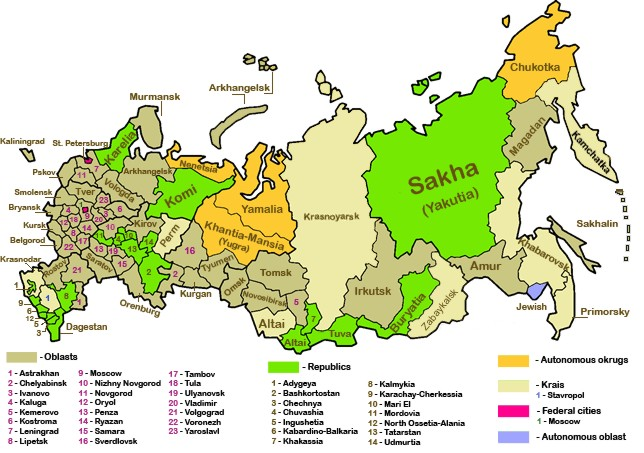
Federal subjects of Russia

- Federal subjects of Russia (83)
  - Republics of Russia (22)
  - Oblasts of Russia (46)
  - Krais of Russia (9)
  - Autonomous oblasts of Russia (1)
  - Autonomous okrugs of Russia (4)
  - Federal cities of Russia (3)
- Types of inhabited localities in Russia
  - List of cities and towns in Russia

===== Republics of Russia =====
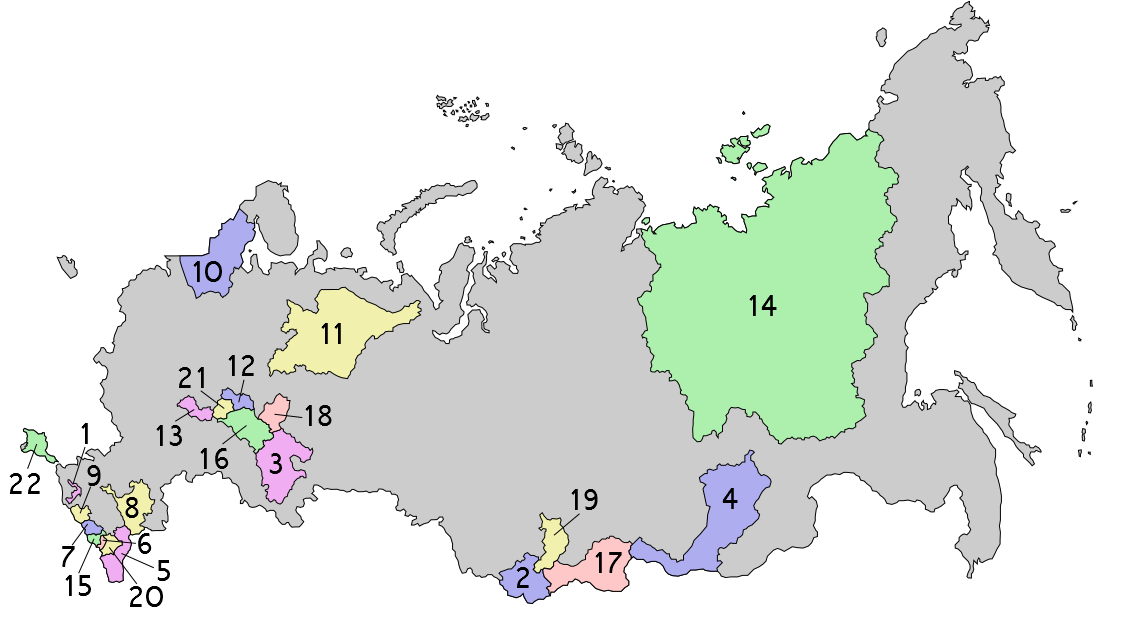

1. Republic of Adygea	11. Komi Republic	21. Chuvash Republic
2. Altai Republic	12. Mari El Republic	22. Crimea (disputed)
3. Republic of Bashkortostan	13. Republic of Mordovia
4. Buryat Republic	14. Sakha (Yakutia) Republic
5. Republic of Dagestan	15. Republic of North Ossetia–Alania
6. Republic of Ingushetia	16. Republic of Tatarstan
7. Kabardino-Balkar Republic	17. Tuva Republic
8. Republic of Kalmykia	18. Udmurt Republic
9. Karachay–Cherkess Republic	19. Republic of Khakassia
10. Republic of Karelia	20. Chechen Republic

===== Oblasts of Russia =====
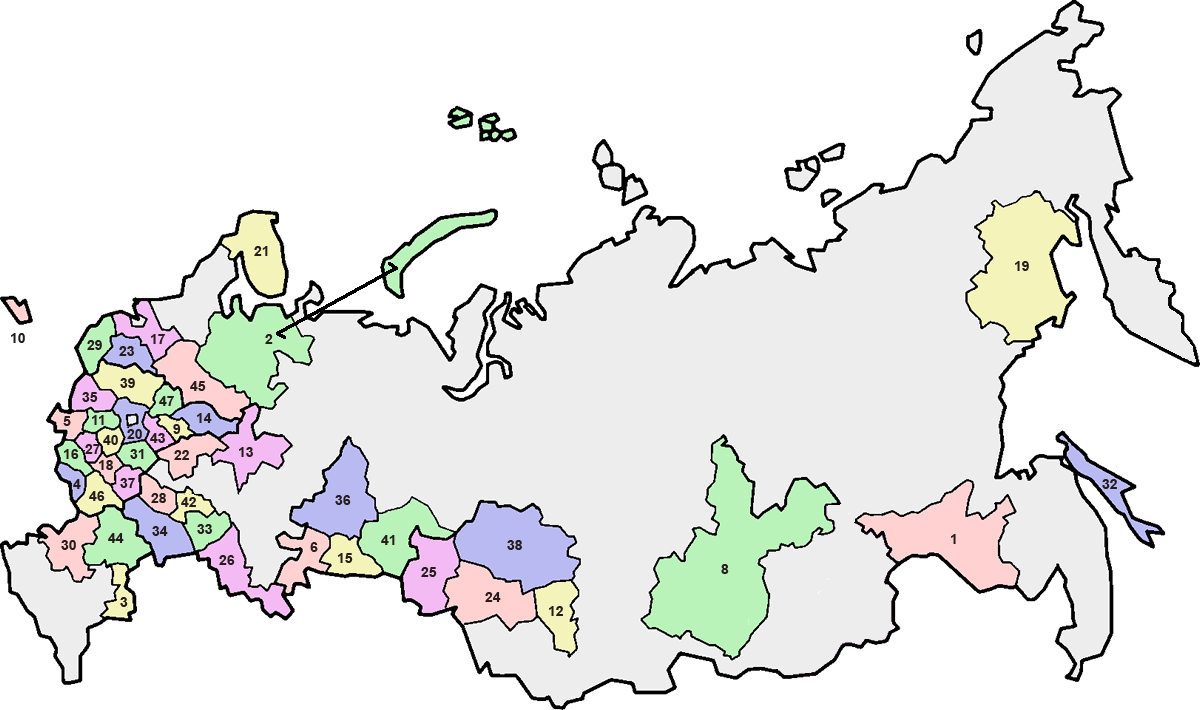

1. Amur Oblast
2. Arkhangelsk Oblast
3. Astrakhan Oblast
4. Belgorod Oblast
5. Bryansk Oblast
6. Chelyabinsk Oblast
7. Chita Oblast (former)
8. Irkutsk Oblast
9. Ivanovo Oblast
10. Kaliningrad Oblast

11. Kaluga Oblast
12. Kemerovo Oblast
13. Kirov Oblast
14. Kostroma Oblast
15. Kurgan Oblast
16. Kursk Oblast
17. Leningrad Oblast
18. Lipetsk Oblast
19. Magadan Oblast
20. Moscow Oblast

21. Murmansk Oblast
22. Nizhny Novgorod Oblast
23. Novgorod Oblast
24. Novosibirsk Oblast
25. Omsk Oblast
26. Orenburg Oblast
27. Oryol Oblast
28. Penza Oblast
29. Pskov Oblast
30. Rostov Oblast

31. Ryazan Oblast
32. Sakhalin Oblast
33. Samara Oblast
34. Saratov Oblast
35. Smolensk Oblast
36. Sverdlovsk Oblast
37. Tambov Oblast
38. Tomsk
39. Tver Oblast
40. Tula Oblast

41. Tyumen Oblast
42. Ulyanovsk Oblast
43. Vladimir Oblast
44. Volgograd Oblast
45. Vologda Oblast
46. Voronezh Oblast
47. Yaroslavl Oblast

===== Krais of Russia =====
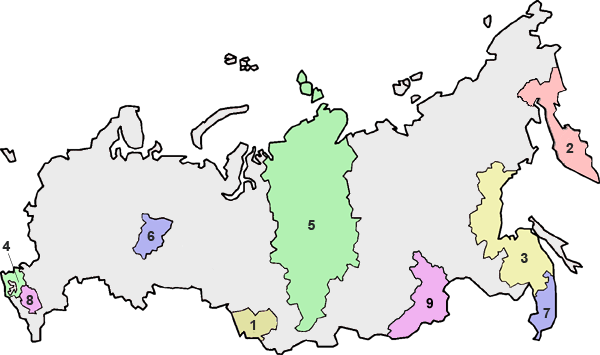

1.Altai Krai
2.Kamchatka Krai
3.Khabarovsk Krai

4.Krasnodar Krai
5.Krasnoyarsk Krai
6.Perm Krai

7.Primorsky Krai
8.Stavropol Krai
9.Zabaykalsky Krai

===== Autonomous oblasts of Russia =====
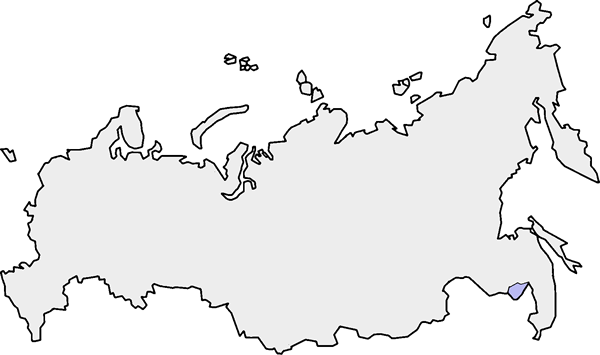

Russia has one autonomous oblast (autonomous province), the Jewish Autonomous Oblast (shaded dark blue).

===== Autonomous okrugs of Russia =====
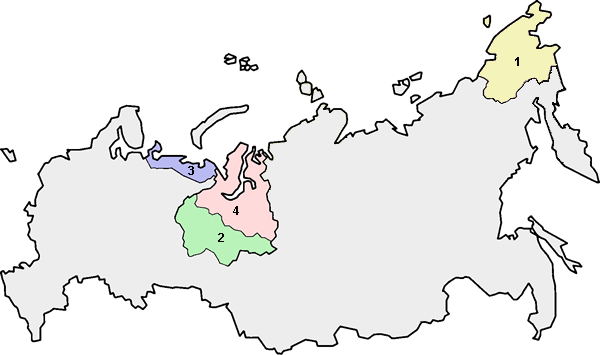

1. Chukotka Autonomous Okrug
2. Khanty–Mansi Autonomous Okrug
3. Nenets Autonomous Okrug
4. Yamalo-Nenets Autonomous Okrug

===== Federal cities of Russia =====
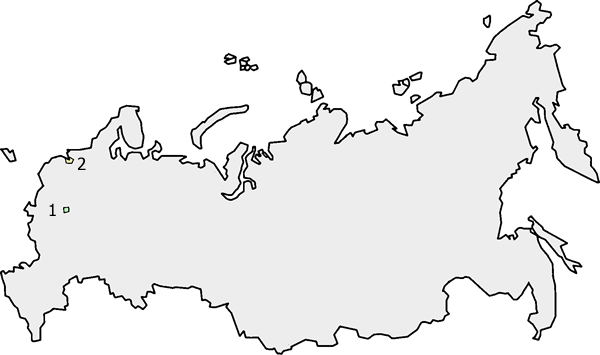

1. Moscow
2. Saint Petersburg

=== Demographics of Russia ===
Demographics of Russia

- 2002 Census

== Government and politics of Russia ==
Russia has made its choice in favor of democracy. Fourteen years ago, independently, without any pressure from outside, it made that decision in the interests of itself and interests of its people — of its citizens. This is our final choice, and we have no way back. There can be no return to what we used to have before. And the guarantee for this is the choice of the Russian people, themselves. No, guarantees from outside cannot be provided. This is impossible. It would be impossible for Russia today. Any kind of turn towards totalitarianism for Russia would be impossible, due to the condition of the Russian society.

— Vladimir Putin, statement in press release, Office of the White House Press Secretary, United States (February 24, 2005). "President and President Putin Discuss Strong U.S.-Russian Partnership"

Politics of Russia

- Form of government: federal semi-presidential republic
- Capital of Russia: Moscow
- Anarchism in Russia
- The Development of Capitalism in Russia
- Controversy in Russia regarding the legitimacy of eastward NATO expansion
- Elections in Russia
  - Term limits in Russia
- Liberalism in Russia
- Mass surveillance in Russia
- Opposition to Vladimir Putin in Russia
- Organisations banned in Russia
- Political parties in Russia
- Propaganda in Russia
- Taxation in Russia

=== Branches of the government of Russia ===
Government of Russia

==== Executive branch of the government of Russia ====
- Head of state: President of Russia, Vladimir Putin
  - State Council of the Russian Federation (advisory board to the Head of State)
  - Presidential Administration of Russia (President's support staff)
- Head of government: Prime Minister of Russia, Mikhail Mishustin
  - Public Chamber of Russia
  - 17 Ministries
  - 7 Federal Services
  - 30+ Federal Agencies

==== Legislative branch of the government of Russia ====
- Federal Assembly of Russia (bicameral parliament)
  - Upper house: Federation Council of Russia
  - Lower house: State Duma

==== Judicial branch of the government of Russia ====
Judiciary of Russia

- Constitutional Court of the Russian Federation
- Supreme Court of Russia

=== Foreign relations of Russia ===
Foreign relations of Russia

- Diplomatic missions of Russia
- Diplomatic missions in Russia
- International counter-terrorism operations of Russia

==== International organization membership ====
The Russian Federation is a member of:

- Arctic Council
- Asia-Pacific Economic Cooperation (APEC)
- Association of Southeast Asian Nations (ASEAN) (dialogue partner)
- Association of Southeast Asian Nations Regional Forum (ARF)
- Bank for International Settlements (BIS)
- Black Sea Economic Cooperation Zone (BSEC)
- Collective Security Treaty Organization (CSTO)
- Commonwealth of Independent States (CIS)
- Council of Europe (CE)
- Council of the Baltic Sea States (CBSS)
- Eurasian Economic Community (EAEC)
- Euro-Atlantic Partnership Council (EAPC)
- European Bank for Reconstruction and Development (EBRD)
- European Organization for Nuclear Research (CERN) (observer)
- General Confederation of Trade Unions (GCTU)
- Group of Eight (G8)
- Group of Twenty Finance Ministers and Central Bank Governors (G20)
- International Atomic Energy Agency (IAEA)
- International Bank for Reconstruction and Development (IBRD)
- International Chamber of Commerce (ICC)
- International Civil Aviation Organization (ICAO)
- International Criminal Court (ICCt) (signatory)
- International Criminal Police Organization (Interpol)
- International Development Association (IDA)
- International Federation of Red Cross and Red Crescent Societies (IFRCS)
- International Finance Corporation (IFC)
- International Hydrographic Organization (IHO)
- International Labour Organization (ILO)
- International Maritime Organization (IMO)
- International Mobile Satellite Organization (IMSO)
- International Monetary Fund (IMF)
- International Olympic Committee (IOC)
- International Organization for Migration (IOM) (observer)
- International Organization for Standardization (ISO)
- International Red Cross and Red Crescent Movement (ICRM)
- International Telecommunication Union (ITU)
- International Telecommunications Satellite Organization (ITSO)
- International Trade Union Confederation (ITUC)
- Inter-Parliamentary Union (IPU)
- Latin American Integration Association (LAIA) (observer)
- Multilateral Investment Guarantee Agency (MIGA)
- Nonaligned Movement (NAM) (guest)
- Nuclear Suppliers Group (NSG)
- Organisation of Islamic Cooperation (OIC) (observer)
- Organisation for Economic Co-operation and Development (OECD) (accession state)
- Organization for Security and Cooperation in Europe (OSCE)
- Organisation for the Prohibition of Chemical Weapons (OPCW)
- Organization of American States (OAS) (observer)
- Paris Club
- Partnership for Peace (PFP)
- Permanent Court of Arbitration (PCA)
- Shanghai Cooperation Organisation (SCO)
- United Nations (UN)
- United Nations Conference on Trade and Development (UNCTAD)
- United Nations Educational, Scientific, and Cultural Organization (UNESCO)
- United Nations High Commissioner for Refugees (UNHCR)
- United Nations Industrial Development Organization (UNIDO)
- United Nations Institute for Training and Research (UNITAR)
- United Nations Mission for the Referendum in Western Sahara (MINURSO)
- United Nations Mission in Liberia (UNMIL)
- United Nations Mission in the Sudan (UNMIS)
- United Nations Observer Mission in Georgia (UNOMIG)
- United Nations Operation in Cote d'Ivoire (UNOCI)
- United Nations Organization Mission in the Democratic Republic of the Congo (MONUC)
- United Nations Security Council (permanent member)
- United Nations Truce Supervision Organization (UNTSO)
- Universal Postal Union (UPU)
- World Customs Organization (WCO)
- World Federation of Trade Unions (WFTU)
- World Health Organization (WHO)
- World Intellectual Property Organization (WIPO)
- World Meteorological Organization (WMO)
- World Tourism Organization (UNWTO)
- World Trade Organization (WTO) (observer)
- World Veterans Federation
- Zangger Committee (ZC)

=== Law and order in Russia ===
Law of Russia

- Abortion in Russia
- Animal welfare and rights in Russia
- Classified information in Russia
- Constitution of Russia
- Gun control in Russia
- Hunting in Russia
- History of international law in Russia
- Types of legal entities in Russia
- Martial law in Russia

==== Crime in Russia ====
- Crime in Russia
- Cannabis in Russia
- Corruption in Russia
  - People accused of bribery in Russia
- Gambling in Russia
- Homicide in Russia
  - Mass shootings in Russia
  - Massacres in Russia
- Human trafficking in Russia
- Prostitution in Russia

==== Human rights in Russia ====
Human rights in Russia

- Racism in Russia
- LGBT rights in Russia
  - Recognition of same-sex unions in Russia
- Freedom of assembly in Russia
- Freedom of religion in Russia
- Media freedom in Russia

==== Law enforcement in Russia ====
Law enforcement in Russia

- Capital punishment in Russia
- Prisons in Russia
  - Life imprisonment in Russia

=== Military of Russia ===
Military of Russia

- Command
  - Commander-in-chief:President of the Russian Federation
- Russian Armed Forces
  - Russian Ground Forces
  - Russian Navy
  - Russian Aerospace Forces
  - Strategic Missile Troops
  - Russian Airborne Troops
  - Russian Special Operations Forces
- Military history of Russia
- Military ranks of Russia
- Military training in Russia
  - Military academies in Russia
  - Reserve Officer Training in Russia

=== Local government in Russia ===
Local government in Russia

== History of Russia ==
=== History of Russia, by period ===
- Ancient Russia
  - Proto-Indo-Europeans
  - Scythians
  - Bosporan Kingdom
  - Khazaria
- Early East Slavs
  - East Slavs
  - Rus' Khaganate
- Kievan Rus'
- Mongol invasion of Rus
- Tatar invasions
- Volga Bulgaria
- Golden Horde
- Grand Duchy of Moscow
- Tsardom of Russia
- Russian Empire
  - French invasion of Russia
  - History of Russia (1894–1917)
    - Russia in World War I
    - Russian Revolution of 1917
- Russian Civil War
- History of the Soviet Union
  - Russian SFSR
  - Soviet Union
  - Soviet Union in World War II
    - World War II casualties of the Soviet Union
  - Cold War
  - Soviet–Afghan War
  - Dissolution of the Soviet Union
- History of Russia (1991–present)
  - Russian Federation
  - 1993 Russian constitutional crisis
  - First Chechen War (1994–1995)
  - Second Chechen War (1999–2009)
  - Insurgency in the North Caucasus (2009–2017)
  - Russo-Ukrainian War (outline) (2014–present)
    - Annexation of Crimea by the Russian Federation (2014)
      - Timeline of the annexation of Crimea by the Russian Federation
      - 2014 Crimean status referendum
      - 2014 anti-war protests in Russia
    - War in Donbas
      - Timeline of the war in Donbas
    - 2022 Russian invasion of Ukraine
      - Timeline of the 2022 Russian invasion of Ukraine
      - 2022 Russian invasion of Ukraine reactions
      - Allegations of child abductions in the 2022 Russian invasion of Ukraine
      - Allegations of genocide of Ukrainians in the 2022 Russian invasion of Ukraine
      - Anonymous and the 2022 Russian invasion of Ukraine
      - 2022 anti-war protests in Russia
      - Attacks on civilians in the 2022 Russian invasion of Ukraine
      - Belarusian involvement in the 2022 Russian invasion of Ukraine
      - Chechen involvement in the 2022 Russian invasion of Ukraine
      - China and the 2022 Russian invasion of Ukraine
      - Collaboration with Russia during the 2022 Russian invasion of Ukraine
      - Corporate responses to the 2022 Russian invasion of Ukraine
      - Economic impact of the 2022 Russian invasion of Ukraine
      - Environmental impact of the 2022 Russian invasion of Ukraine
      - Fundraising for Ukraine during the 2022 Russian invasion of Ukraine
      - Government and intergovernmental reactions to the 2022 Russian invasion of Ukraine
      - Humanitarian impact of the 2022 Russian invasion of Ukraine
      - Impact of the 2022 Russian invasion of Ukraine on nuclear power plants
      - International sanctions during the 2022 Russian invasion of Ukraine
      - Legality of the 2022 Russian invasion of Ukraine
      - List of damaged cultural sites during the 2022 Russian invasion of Ukraine
      - List of military engagements during the 2022 Russian invasion of Ukraine
      - List of monuments and memorials removed following the Russian invasion of Ukraine
      - List of streets renamed due to the 2022 Russian invasion of Ukraine
      - Non-government reactions to the 2022 Russian invasion of Ukraine
      - Nuclear threats during the 2022 Russian invasion of Ukraine
      - Open-source intelligence in the 2022 Russian invasion of Ukraine
      - Order of battle for the 2022 Russian invasion of Ukraine
      - Prelude to the 2022 Russian invasion of Ukraine
      - Proposed no-fly zone in the 2022 Russian invasion of Ukraine
      - Protests against the 2022 Russian invasion of Ukraine
      - 2022 rail war in Russia
      - Sexual violence in the 2022 Russian invasion of Ukraine
      - Speeches by Volodymyr Zelenskyy during the 2022 Russian invasion of Ukraine
      - Statements of the Riigikogu 2022 on the Russian invasion of Ukraine
      - Ukrainian resistance during the 2022 Russian invasion of Ukraine
      - United States and the 2022 Russian invasion of Ukraine
      - Use of white phosphorus bombs in the 2022 Russian invasion of Ukraine
      - War crimes in the 2022 Russian invasion of Ukraine
      - Wikipedia and the 2022 Russian invasion of Ukraine
      - Women in the 2022 Russian invasion of Ukraine
      - Yachts impacted by international sanctions following the Russian invasion of Ukraine

==== History of Russia, by year ====
1700 - 1701 - 1702 - 1703 - 1704 - 1705 - 1706 - 1707 - 1708 - 1709 - 1710 - 1711 - 1712 - 1714 - 1715 - 1717 - 1718 - 1720 - 1721 - 1722 - 1723 - 1724 - 1725 - 1726 - 1727 - 1729 - 1730 - 1731 - 1732 - 1735 - 1736 - 1739 - 1740 - 1741 - 1742 - 1743 - 1744 - 1745 - 1746 - 1747 - 1750 - 1751 - 1752 - 1754 - 1755 - 1756 - 1757 - 1758 - 1759 - 1760 - 1761 - 1762 - 1763 - 1764 - 1765 - 1767 - 1768 - 1770 - 1771 - 1772 - 1773 - 1774 - 1775 - 1776 - 1778 - 1779 - 1780 - 1781 - 1782 - 1783 - 1784 - 1785 - 1786 - 1787 - 1788 - 1789 - 1790 - 1791 - 1792 - 1793 - 1794 - 1795 - 1796 - 1797 - 1798 - 1799 - 1800 - 1801 - 1802 - 1803 - 1804 - 1805 - 1806 - 1807 - 1808 - 1809 - 1810 - 1811 - 1812 - 1813 - 1814 - 1815 - 1818 - 1821 - 1824 - 1825 - 1828 - 1829 - 1830 - 1831 - 1834 - 1837 - 1840 - 1843 - 1844 - 1845 - 1846 - 1848 - 1849 - 1851 - 1852 - 1853 - 1854 - 1855 - 1856 - 1857 - 1858 - 1859 - 1860 - 1861 - 1862 - 1863 - 1864 - 1865 - 1866 - 1867 - 1868 - 1869 - 1870 - 1872 - 1874 - 1875 - 1876 - 1877 - 1878 - 1879 - 1880 - 1881 - 1882 - 1883 - 1884 - 1885 - 1886 - 1887 - 1888 - 1889 - 1890 - 1891 - 1892 - 1893 - 1894 - 1895 - 1896 - 1897 - 1898 - 1899 - 1900 - 1901 - 1902 - 1903 - 1904 - 1905 - 1906 - 1907 - 1908 - 1909 - 1910 - 1911 - 1912 - 1913 - 1914 - 1915 - 1916 - 1917 - 1918 - 1919 - 1920 - 1921 - 1992 - 1993 - 1994 - 1995 - 1996 - 1997 - 1998 - 1999 - 2000 - 2001 - 2002 - 2003 - 2004 - 2005 - 2006 - 2007 - 2008 - 2009 - 2010 - 2011 - 2012 - 2013 - 2014 - 2015 - 2016 - 2017 - 2018 - 2019 - 2020 - 2021 - 2022 -

=== History of Russia, by Region ===
==== Republics ====
- History of Adygea
- History of the Altai Republic
- History of Bashkortostan
- History of Buryatia
- History of Chechnya
- History of Chuvashia
- History of Dagestan
- History of Ingushetia
- History of Kabardino-Balkaria
- History of Kalmykia
- History of Karachay-Cherkessia
- History of the Republic of Karelia
- History of Khakassia
- History of the Komi Republic
- History of Mari El
- History of Mordovia
- History of North Ossetia–Alania
- History of the Sakha Republic
- History of Tatarstan
- History of Tuva
- History of Udmurtia

==== Krais ====
- History of Altai Krai
- History of Kamchatka Krai
- History of Khabarovsk Krai
- History of Krasnodar Krai
- History of Krasnoyarsk Krai
- History of Perm Krai
- History of Primorsky Krai
- History of Stavropol Krai
- History of Zabaykalsky Krai

==== Oblasts ====
- History of Amur Oblast
- History of Arkhangelsk Oblast
- History of Astrakhan Oblast
- History of Belgorod Oblast
- History of Bryansk Oblast
- History of Chelyabinsk Oblast
- History of Irkutsk Oblast
- History of Ivanovo Oblast
- History of Kaliningrad Oblast
- History of Kaluga Oblast
- History of Kemerovo Oblast
- History of Kirov Oblast
- History of Kostroma Oblast
- History of Kurgan Oblast
- History of Kursk Oblast
- History of Leningrad Oblast
- History of Lipetsk Oblast
- History of Magadan Oblast
- History of Moscow Oblast
- History of Murmansk Oblast
- History of Nizhny Novgorod Oblast
- History of Novgorod Oblast
- History of Novosibirsk Oblast
- History of Omsk Oblast
- History of Orenburg Oblast
- History of Oryol Oblast
- History of Penza Oblast
- History of Pskov Oblast
- History of Rostov Oblast
- History of Ryazan Oblast
- History of Sakhalin Oblast
- History of Samara Oblast
- History of Saratov Oblast
- History of Smolensk Oblast
- History of Sverdlovsk Oblast
- History of Tambov Oblast
- History of Tomsk Oblast
- History of Tula Oblast
- History of Tver Oblast
- History of Tyumen Oblast
- History of Ulyanovsk Oblast
- History of Vladimir Oblast
- History of Volgograd Oblast
- History of Vologda Oblast
- History of Voronezh Oblast
- History of Yaroslavl Oblast

==== Federal cities ====
- History of Moscow
- History of Saint Petersburg

=== History of Russia, by subject ===
- History of Russian culture
- Economic history of the Russian Federation
  - The Development of Capitalism in Russia
- Earthquakes in Russia
- Film history of Russia
  - History of Russian animation
- History of Freemasonry in Russia
- History of Germans in Russia, Ukraine and the Soviet Union
- History of innovation in Russia
- History of international law in Russia
- History of the Internet in Russia
- History of the Jews in Russia
  - The Holocaust in Russia
- LGBT history in Russia
- McDonald's in Russia
- Monarchism in Russia
- Military history of Russia
  - Red Army
- Postage stamps and postal history of Russia
- History of rail transport in Russia
- History of the Russian language
- The Sexual Revolution in Russia
- Serfdom in Russia
- Slavery in Russia
- Witch trials in Russia

== Culture of Russia ==
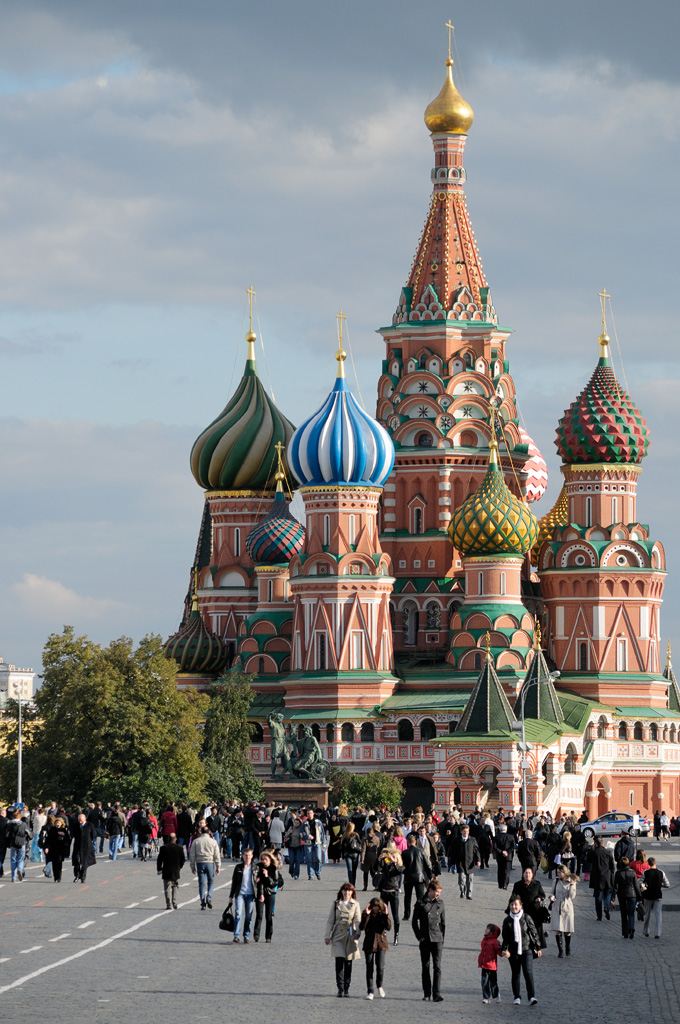
Saint Basil's Cathedral on the Red Square, Moscow

- Cuisine of Russia
- Cultural icons of Russia
- Festivals in Russia
- Funerals in Russia
- Humor in Russia
- Languages of Russia
  - Russian language
- LGBT culture in Russia
- Material culture in Russia
- Media in Russia
- Museums in Russia
- National symbols of Russia
  - Coat of arms of Russia
  - Flag of Russia
  - List of Russian flags
  - National anthem of Russia
- People of Russia
  - Famous Russians
- Prostitution in Russia
- Public holidays in Russia
- Records of Russia
- Russian folklore
- Russian martial arts
- World Heritage Sites in Russia
- Scouting in Russia
- Time in Russia
  - Date and time notation in Russia
- UFO sightings in Russia
- Video games in Russia
- Women in Russia
  - Feminism in Russia

=== The arts in Russia ===
- Art in Russia
  - Russian avant-garde
  - Graffiti in Russia
- Ballet in Russia
- Cinema of Russia
- Literature of Russia
- Music of Russia
  - Rock music in Russia
- Television in Russia
- Theatre in Russia
- Opera in Russia

==== Architecture of Russia ====
Architecture of Russia

- Russian architecture
- Art Nouveau Architecture in Russia
- Russian church architecture
  - Cathedrals in Russia
- Lighthouses in Russia
- Neoclassical architecture in Russia
  - Russian neoclassical revival
- Russian Revival architecture
- Stalinist Architecture
- Tallest buildings in Russia

=== Ethnic groups in Russia ===
- Afghans in Russia
- Armenians in Russia
- Assyrians in Russia
- Azerbaijanis in Russia
- Belarusians in Russia
- Ethnic Chinese in Russia
- Georgians in Russia
- Indians in Russia
- Iranians in Russia
- Japanese people in Russia
- Kazakhs in Russia
- Kurds in Russia
- Moldovans in Russia
- Latvians in Russia
- Nepalis in Russia
- North Koreans in Russia
- Serbs in Russia
- Turks in Russia
- Ukrainians in Russia
- Uzbeks in Russia
- Vietnamese people in Russia

=== Sports in Russia ===
Sports in Russia

- Athletics in Russia
- Cricket in Russia
- Curling clubs in Russia
- Golf in Russia
- Rugby in Russia (disambiguation)
  - Rugby league in Russia
  - Rugby union in Russia
- Volleyball in Russia

==== Football in Russia ====
Football in Russia (disambiguation)

- Football clubs in Russia
  - Football clubs in Russia by competitive honours won
- Football derbies in Russia
- Football stadiums in Russia
- Football records and statistics in Russia
  - Footballer of the Year in Russia (disambiguation)
    - Footballer of the Year in Russia (Futbol)
    - Footballer of the Year in Russia (Sport-Express)
- Women's football in Russia

=== Religion in Russia ===
Religion in Russia

- Buddhism in Russia
- Christianity in Russia
  - Armenian churches in Russia
  - Baháʼí Faith in Russia
  - Russian Orthodox Church
  - Bible Society in Russia
  - Cathedrals in Russia
  - Catholic Church in Russia
    - Catholic dioceses in Russia
  - Christmas in Russia
  - The Church of Jesus Christ of Latter-day Saints in Russia
  - Protestantism in Russia
  - Union of Evangelical Reformed Churches in Russia
- Hinduism in Russia
- Irreligion in Russia
- Islam in Russia
- Judaism in Russia
  - Synagogues in Russia
- Scientology in Russia
- Sikhism in Russia
- Slavic Native Faith in Russia
- Zoroastrianism in Russia

== Economy and infrastructure of Russia ==
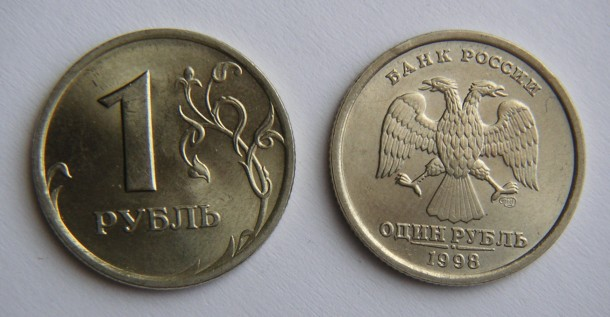
Russian currency: The Ruble

Economy of Russia

- Economic rank, by nominal GDP (2008): eighth
- Companies of Russia
- The Development of Capitalism in Russia
- Currency of Russia: Ruble
  - ISO 4217: RUB
- Economic history of Russia
- Russian Industrial Leaders Index
- Russia Stock Exchange
- Social security system in Russia
- Social entrepreneurship in Russia
- Special Economic Zones in Russia
- Taxation in Russia
- Types of business entity in Russia
- Unemployment in Russia

=== Industries and economic sectors in Russia ===
- Agriculture in Russia
  - Fishing industry in Russia
- Banking in Russia
  - Central Bank of Russia
- Chemical industry in Russia
- Defense industry of Russia
- Health care in Russia
  - Pharmaceutical industry in Russia
- Mining in Russia
  - Mines in Russia
- Petroleum industry in Russia
- Retail industry in Russia
  - Grocery retailing in Russia
    - Supermarket chains in Russia
- Tourism in Russia
- Waste management in Russia
- Water supply and sanitation in Russia

==== Communications in Russia ====
- Mass media in Russia
- Newspapers in Russia
- Telecommunications in Russia
  - Internet in Russia
    - History of the Internet in Russia
  - Telephone numbers in Russia
  - Television in Russia
    - Russian-language television channels

==== Energy in Russia ====
Energy in Russia

- Coal in Russia
- Energy policy of Russia
- Oil industry in Russia
- Power stations in Russia
- Renewable energy in Russia
  - Geothermal power in Russia
  - Wind power in Russia

==== Transport in Russia ====
Transport in Russia

- Air transport in Russia
  - Airports in Russia
- Rail transport in Russia
  - Railway lines in Russia
  - Busiest railway stations in Russia
  - Trolleybus systems in Russia
  - History of rail transport in Russia
- Road transport in Russia
  - Roads in Russia
    - Motorways in Russia
  - Road signs in Russia
- Maritime transport in Russia
  - Canals in Russia
  - Lighthouses in Russia
  - Shipbuilding in Russia
- Urban electric transport in Russia

== Education in Russia ==
Education in Russia

- Academic grading in Russia
- Academic ranks in Russia
- Institutions of higher education in Russia
  - Law schools in Russia
  - Medical schools in Russia
- Military academies in Russia
- Museums in Russia

== Health in Russia ==
Health in Russia

- Alcohol consumption in Russia
- Healthcare in Russia
- HIV/AIDS in Russia
- Hospitals in Russia
- Medical schools in Russia
- Mental health in Russia
- Pharmaceutical industry in Russia
- Suicide in Russia
- Women's reproductive health in Russia

== See also ==
- List of international rankings
- Member state of the Group of Twenty Finance Ministers and Central Bank Governors
- Member state of the United Nations
- Outline of Asia
- Outline of Europe
- Outline of geography
