= Football records and statistics in Russia =

This page details football records in Russia.

== Team records ==
=== Most championships won ===
==== Overall ====
- 10, Spartak Moscow (1992, 1993, 1994, 1996, 1997, 1998, 1999, 2000, 2001, 2017)

==== Consecutives ====
- 6, Spartak Moscow (1996–2001)

==== Highest points total ====
- 72, Zenit St. Petersburg (2020), Spartak Moscow (1999).

=== Most seasons in Russian Premier League ===
- 24, CSKA Moscow
- 24, Lokomotiv Moscow
- 24, Spartak Moscow
- 23, Dynamo Moscow
- 23, Krylia Sovetov Samara

== Individual records ==
=== League Appearances ===
- 558, Igor Akinfeev

=== League Goalscorers ===
- 161, Artem Dzyuba

== Most successful clubs overall ==
Club	Russia					USSR					European					Total
Club	Premier League	Russian Cup	League Cup	Super Cup	Total	Top League	Soviet Cup	Federation Cup	Super Cup	Total	CL	CWC	EL	SC	Total	Total
Spartak Moscow	10	3	-	1	14	12	10	1	-	23	-	-	-	-	-	37
CSKA Moscow	6	8	-	7	21	7	5	-	-	12	-	-	1	-	1	34
Zenit St. Petersburg	9	4	1	8	22	1	1	-	1	3	-	-	1	1	2	27
Dynamo Moscow	-	1	-	-	1	11	6	-	1	18	-	-	-	-	-	19
Lokomotiv Moscow	3	9	-	3	16	-	2	-	-	2	-	-	-	-	-	17
Torpedo Moscow	-	1	-	-	1	3	6	-	-	9	-	-	-	-	-	10
Rubin Kazan	2	1	-	2	5	-	-	-	-	-	-	-	-	-	-	5
Alania Vladikavkaz	1	-	-	-	1	-	-	-	-	-	-	-	-	-	-	1
Terek Grozny	-	1	-	-	1	-	-	-	-	-	-	-	-	-	-	1
FC Rostov	-	1	-	-	1	-	-	-	-	-	-	-	-	-	-	1
FC Tosno	-	1	-	-	1	-	-	-	-	-	-	-	-	-	-	1
SKVO Rostov-on-Don	-	-	-	-	-	-	1	-	-	1	-	-	-	-	-	1
