= 1737 in Russia =

Events from the year 1737 in Russia

== Incumbents ==
- Monarch – Anna

== Event ==
- 1737 Kamchatka earthquake

== Birth ==
- Platon Levshin, Metropolitan of Moscow
- Iosif Igelström, Russian general
- Alexei Grigoryevich Orlov, Russian soldier
- Vasily Bazhenov, Russian neoclassical architect
- Wilhelm Derfelden, Russian general of the cavalry

== Death ==
- Dmitry Mikhailovich Golitsyn the Elder, Russian aristocrat
- Stepan Velyaminov, Russian general
