= Funerals in Russia =

Cremation was forbidden by the Russian Orthodox Church.

In 1905 the Russian Ministry of Internal Affairs reported that ” the burial of dead bodies in cemeteries in the major populated centres represents a serious financial burden for the public authorities”.

Cemeteries and coffin-making businesses were nationalised by the Bolshevik government in December 1918. It was decided that “distinction by rank whether they apply to the place of burial or to the style of the funeral will be annihilated”. Under the New Economic Policy from 1922 there was some re-privatisation of cemeteries and funerals.

Gravediggers, as public employees, were required to dig two full size graves or four smaller ones each day. There were now 3 sizes for coffins, one style and fixed prices. There were sometimes considerable delays in burials. In Petrograd there were 241 unburied bodies found by inspectors in 1920.

A cremation subcommittee was formed in 1919 and the first cremations (of the unclaimed dead) in Petrograd began in 1920. The first crematorium opened in Moscow in 1927.
