= Grocery retailing in Russia =

Grocery retailing in Russia is going through a period of rapid transition from market trading and small stores to modern supermarkets.

== Markets ==
In the 1990s, a very large part of Russian retail trade was conducted in markets. Since then the share of retail trade taken by markets has gradually fallen

There are considerable variations by region. In the Kirov Oblast, their overall share of all retail sales in 2010 is now only 5%. Moscow city, with its very high living costs and large population of low-income shoppers, remains a stronghold of market trading. 21% of all retail sales in Moscow are still through markets.

All types of food are sold on markets, but they are particularly important (as in most countries) as outlets for fruit and vegetables. In Russia they also retain a big share of the market for meat. 33% of all fresh red meat and 17% of poultry is sold though markets. Market shares are much lower for manufactured and prepared foods.

== Independent retailers ==
Independent retailers, mostly food specialists but also (particularly in country districts) general stores, still take up 70% of all retail food turnover. This percentage is gradually decreasing. There are over 100,000 independent retailers which sell food. Even in Moscow, they outnumber multiple stores by 4 to 1. Some of these shops are supermarkets and small self-service stores, but most are traditional small shops. With the spread of supermarkets everywhere, they are everywhere losing market share. But this is a gradual process.

== Supermarkets ==
The great majority of Russian supermarkets are of about 400 sq.m. sales area and are situated in centres of population - often on the ground floor of big apartment blocks. They are designed for pedestrian access. Stores of this kind are known as “discounters” although they differ somewhat from the discounters of the West: they offer a full range of foods and everyday FMCG needs, likely to be supplemented mainly by visits to markets for some extra produce and perhaps meat and fish. A typical discounter offers about 3000 SKUs.

New stores of this kind are still being opened on a large scale, but in recent years (as a result of increased car ownership) the fastest growth has been in hypermarkets. Russian hypermarkets have sales areas of 3000 sq.m. upwards and offer at least 20,000 SKUs.

== See also ==
- List of supermarket chains in Russia
