= UFO sightings in Russia =

List of alleged UFO sightings within the nation of Russia

The following are some alleged sightings of unidentified flying objects in Russia:

== 1900s ==
- The Tunguska event of 1908 is considered to have been the explosion of a meteor, though some regard it as an explosion of a UFO.

== 1970s ==
- The Petrozavodsk phenomenon on 20 September 1977 was reported.

== 1980s ==
- In Usove in Soviet Ukraine, on 4 October 1982, a group of nuclear missiles reportedly became activated as a UFO hovered above a missile launch facility.
- On 13 October 1987, at 8:35 am, an alleged encounter in Siberia was said to have occurred wherein the crew of a crashed UFO reportedly retaliated against the military unit that downed their craft. This purported event was logged in KGB records.
- The Voronezh UFO incident of 1989 was reported.

== 1990s ==
- The Sasovo explosions were two mysterious explosions which occurred on 12 April 1990 and 8 July 1992, equivalent to 25 tons of TNT.

== 2000s ==
- Early in 2012, a crashed titanium object, described as a "UFO fragment", was reported to have been recently retrieved from a forest in the vicinity of Otradnenskoye, a rural locality in Novosibirsk Oblast. Several months prior to the report, in December 2011, strange sounds had been heard in the area. The smooth, silvery, and U-shaped device was attached to a rounded section. It was not deemed to be related to space technology, according to the Russian Federal Space Agency.

== See also ==
- List of reported UFO sightings
