= 1716 in Russia =

This is a list of notable events from the year 1716 in Russia.

== Incumbents ==
- Tsar of all Russia - Peter the Great

== Event ==
- Karl Leopold married Catherine Ivanovna of Russia
- The Norwegian Campaigns started

== Birth ==
- Aleksey Antropov, Russian painter

== Death ==
- Marfa Apraksina, Tsarina of Russia
- Natalya Alexeyevna of Russia, Tsarevna of Russia
- Carl Ewald von Rönne, Russian cavalry officer
- Eugenios Voulgaris, Greek cleric
