= 1738 in Russia =

Events from the year 1738 in Russia

== Incumbents ==
- Monarch – Anna

== Event ==
- Vaganova Academy of Russian Ballet was founded

== Birth ==
- Andrey Bolotov, Russian memoirist and agriculturalist
- Mikhail Kamensky, Russian field marshal
- Matvey Kazakov, Russian Neoclassical architect

== Death ==
- Naum Senyavin, Russian Vice Admiral
- Sava Vladislavich, Russian diplomat
