= 1757 in Russia =

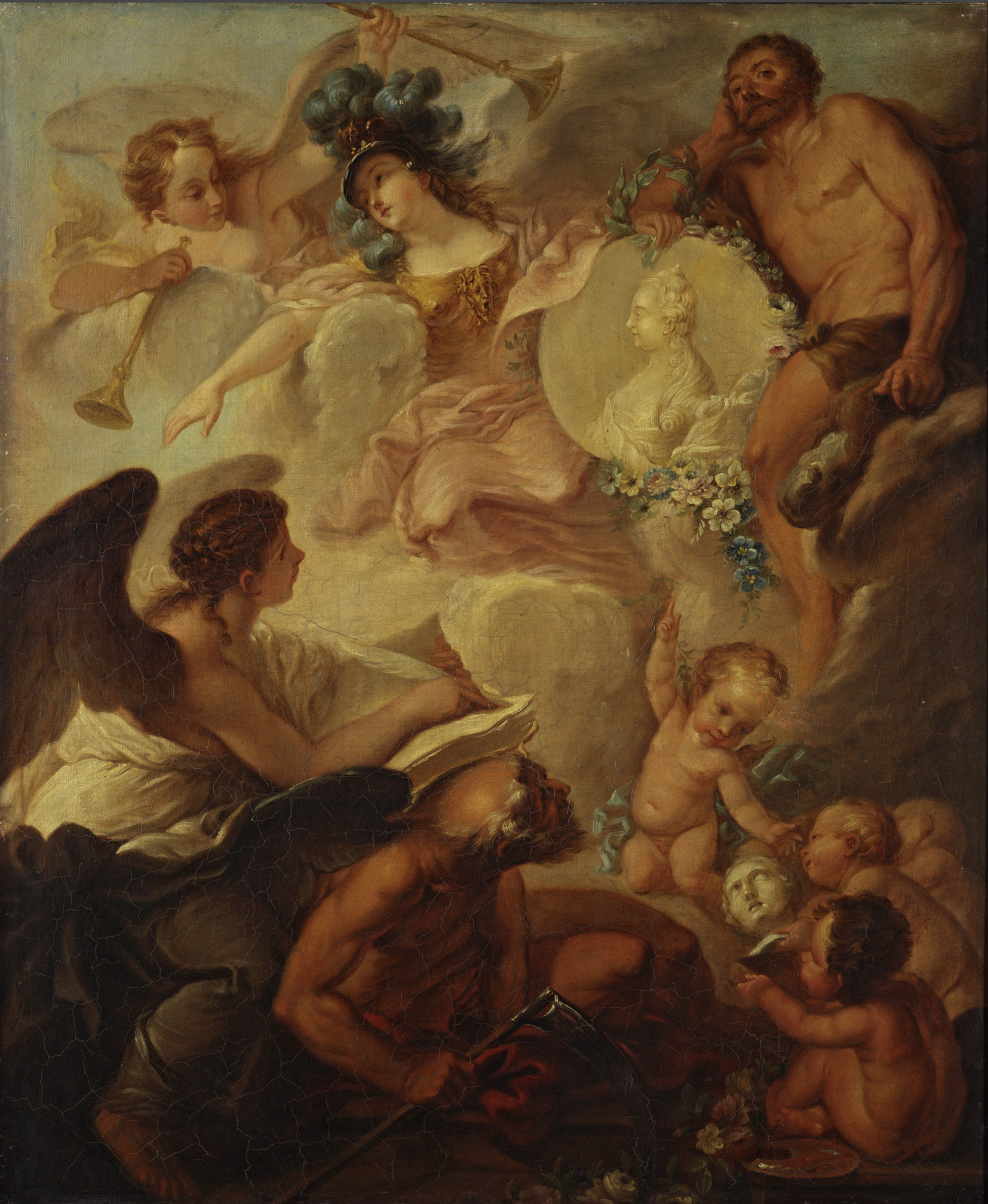
Allegory of Academy of Arts' foundation by anonymous (1750s, Tretyakov gallery)

Events from the year 1757 in Russia

== Incumbents ==
- Monarch – Elizabeth

== Events ==
- Imperial Academy of Arts

== Births ==
- Grand Duchess Anna Petrovna of Russia
- Vladimir Borovikovsky
- Dmitry Khvostov

== Deaths ==
- Mikołaj Dembowski
- Tatyana Borisovna Golitsyna
