= Rugby in Russia =

Rugby in Russia may refer to:

- Rugby union in Russia
- Rugby league in Russia
