= Mikołaj Dembowski =

Roman Catholic bishop (??–1757)

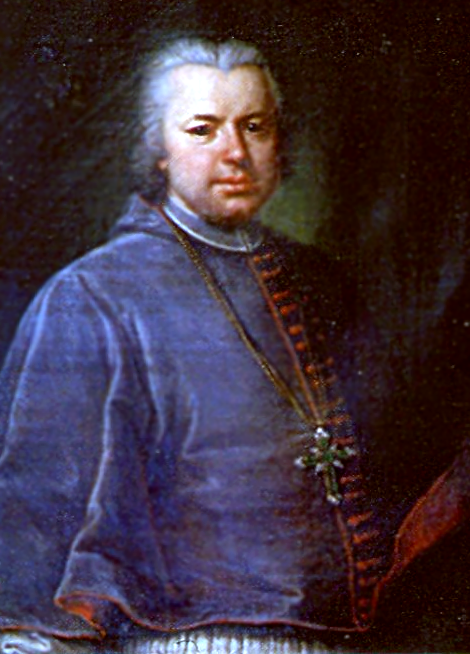
Mikołaj Dembowski

Mikołaj Dembowski (died 1757) was a Catholic bishop in Kamianets-Podilskyi, who, under the influence of Jacob Frank, ordered the burning of all copies of the Talmud, possibly up to ten thousand. He died of a stroke during the disputation between the Frankists and the anti-Sabbatean rabbis. Contemporary anti-Sabbatean sources declared his death a miracle, and claimed that at this time a plague broke out, and that the local priests dug up Dembowski's body and cut off the head as if he were a sorcerer; but the plague did not end until his body was burned in the same place where the sacred books had been burned.
