= 1766 in Russia =

Events from the year 1766 in Russia

== Incumbents ==
- Monarch – Catherine II

== Events ==
- Russian Theatre was founded.
- Assembly of the Nobility was founded.
- Gorodetsk was renamed to Bezhetsk.
- Catherine the Great started educational reforms.
- Gatchina Palace started construction.
- Leonhard Euler returned to the St. Petersburg Academy.
- Sterlitamak was founded.

== Birth ==
- Vasily Pushkin, Russian poet (d. 1830)
- Nikolay Karamzin, Russian historian (d. 1826)
- Gustav Ernst von Stackelberg, Russian diplomat (d. 1850)
- Natalia Kurakina, Russian composer (d. 1831)
- Varvara Golovina, Russian artist (d. 1821)
- Stepan Degtyarev, Russian composer (d. 1813)
- Adam Laxman, Finnish–Swedish military officer (d. 1806)
- Ivan Valberkh, Russian dancer (d. 1819)
- Fyodor Petrovich Lvov, Russian composer

== Death ==
- Ivan Polzunov, Russian inventor
- Alexey Bestuzhev-Ryumin, Russian diplomat and chancellor
- Andrei Ivanovich Bogdanov, Russian bibliographers
