= Footballer of the Year in Russia =

Footballer of the Year in Russia may refer to:

- Footballer of the Year in Russia (Sport-Express), annual award given by Sport-Express daily
- Footballer of the Year in Russia (Futbol), annual award given by Futbol weekly
