= 1719 in Russia =

This is a list of notable events from the year 1719 in Russia.

== Incumbents ==
- Tsar of all Russia - Peter the Great

== Event ==
- Battle of Ösel Island
- Russian Pillage of 1719–21

== Birth ==
- Ivan Ivanovich Belsky, Russian painter
- Julia von Mengden, Russian noble

== Death ==
- Peter Petrovich, Tsarevich of Russia
- Tikhon Streshnev, Russian noble
- Boris Sheremetev, Russian noble
- Mary Hamilton, Russian lady-in-waiting
