= 1759 in Russia =

Events from the year 1759 in Russia

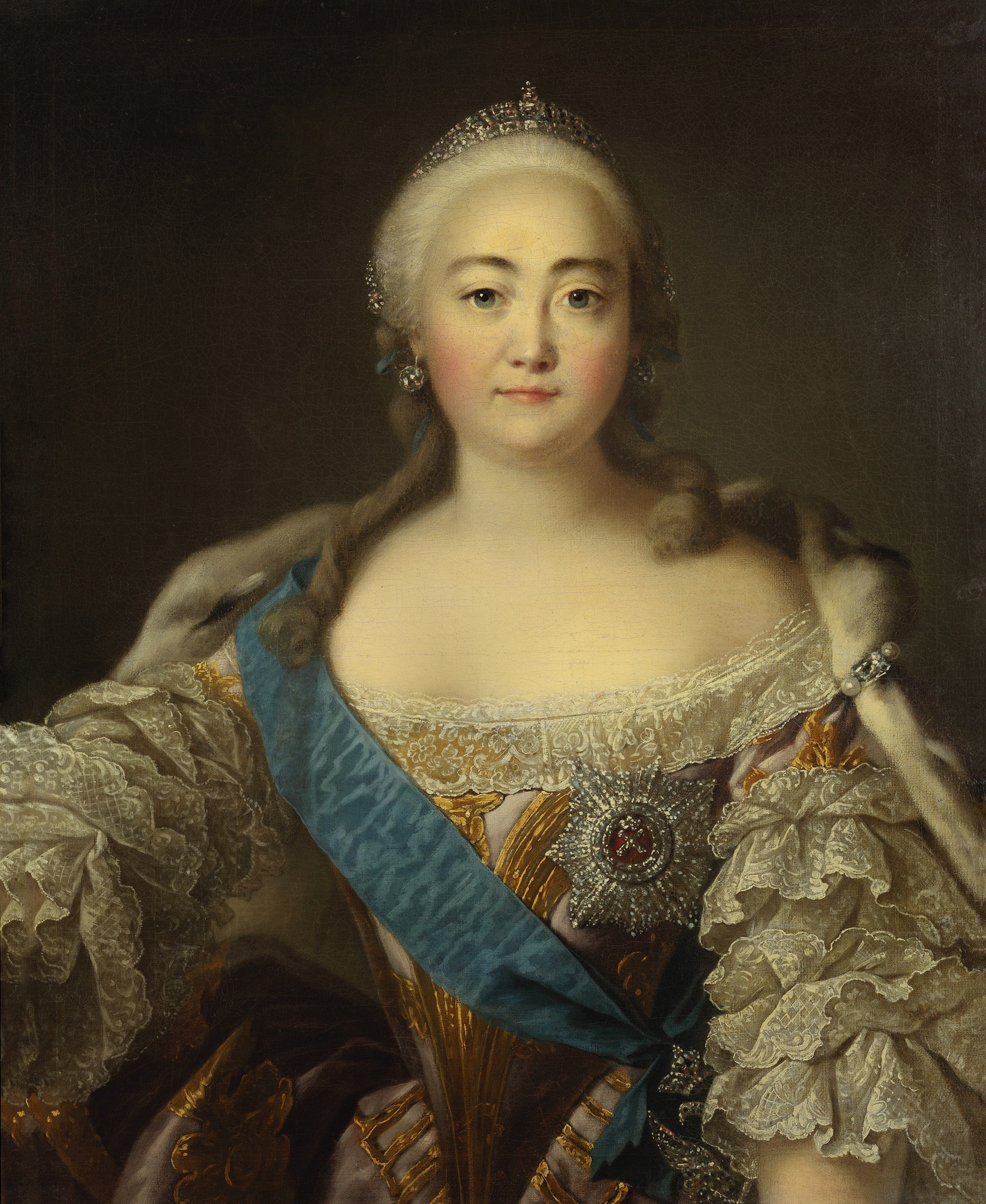
By Louis Tocqué

== Incumbents ==
- Monarch – Elizabeth

== Events ==
- Page Corps military academy founded in Saint Petersburg
- May 10 – The Macedonian Hussar Regiment is formed and starts to assist the Russian Empire in the Seven Years' War.
- August 12 – Battle of Kunersdorf: Frederick the Great is rebuffed in bloody assaults, by the combined Austro–Russian army of Pyotr Saltykov and Ernst von Laudon. This is one of Frederick's greatest defeats.

== Births ==
- Sophie Marie Dorothea of Württemberg, empress of Paul I of Russia (d. 1828)
