= 1720 in Russia =

Events from the year 1720 in Russia

== Incumbents ==
- Monarch – Peter I

== Events ==
- Gold Sword for Bravery
- Annenkrone
- Battle of Zaysan (1720)
- Battle of Grengam
- The General Regulation was issued . It was the first statute of the state civil service
- The Naval Charter was issued, the work on which was carried out under the leadership of Peter I

== Births ==
- Aleksandr Rigelʹman (1720–1789) - Russian military officer, historian, and ethnographer
- Ivan Ivanovich Panfilov (1720 - 1794) - Russian Imperial Army officer and administrator

== Deaths ==
- Yakov Fyodorovich Dolgorukov - (1720 - 1794) - Russian Imperial Army officer and administrator
