= 1763 in Russia =

Events from the year 1763 in Russia

== Incumbents ==
- Monarch – Catherine II

== Events ==
- Palace Embankment
- Mozdok
- Moscow Orphanage

== Deaths ==
- May 11 – Natalia Lopukhina, Russian noble, court official and alleged political conspirator. (born 1699)
