= 1732 in Russia =

Events from the year 1732 in Russia

== Incumbents ==
- Monarch – Anna

== Events ==
- Treaty of the Three Black Eagles
- Treaty of Resht

== Deaths ==
- Agrippina Petrovna Volkonskaia
