= 1742 in Russia =

Events from the year 1742 in Russia

== Incumbents ==
- Monarch – Elizabeth

== Events ==
- The Lopukhina Conspiracy arises at the Russian court.
- Peter III of Russia is brought to Russia from Germany by his aunt, Elizabeth I, to be received by the Russian Orthodox Church and declared heir to the Russian throne.
- Christian Goldbach becomes a staff member of the Russian Ministry of Foreign Affairs and proposes what will become known as Goldbach's conjecture in a letter to Leonhard Euler.
- Elizabeth I reconfirms a Ukase issued by Peter the Great and expels Jews from the Russian Empire.

== Births ==
- Yemelyan Pugachev was an ataman of the Yaik Cossacks who led a great popular insurrection during the reign of Catherine the Great. (d. 1775)
