= 1724 in Russia =

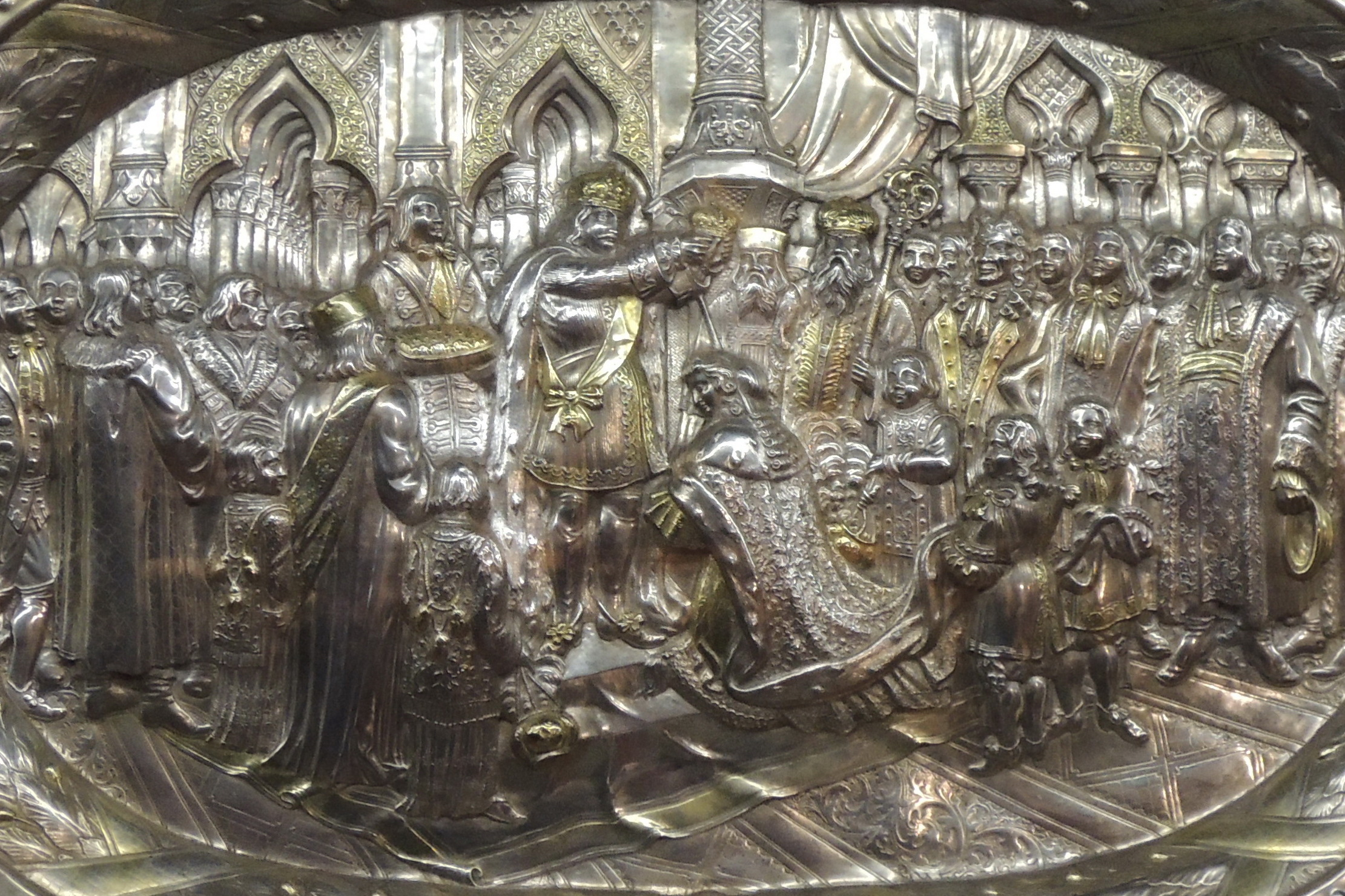
Catherine I of Russia's coronation plate by N.Fedorov (1724–27, Kremlin) by shakko - detail

Events from the year 1724 in Russia

== Incumbents ==
- Monarch – Peter I

== Events ==
- 19 February - Russian Academy of Sciences founded
- 7 May - coronation of Catherine as empress of Russia.
- May - Alexander Menshikov was removed from the post of Governor-General of the Saint Petersburg Governorate for significant abuses. Pyotr Apraksin was appointed to his place.
- 24 June - Treaty of Constantinople was signed delimiting the spheres of influence of the Russian and Ottoman empires in the Transcaucasus.
- 19 November - according to legend, that day emperor Peter I of Russia rushes into the cold Neva to save the drowning soldiers while inspecting ironworks. This icy water rescue is said to have exacerbated Peter's bladder problems and caused his death in February 1725.
- Saint Petersburg Mint and Saint Petersburg State University founded.
- Order of Saint Alexander Nevsky introduced.
- Foundation of Nalchik.

== Births ==
- Immanuel Kant, philosopher
- Ivan Kropotov, diplomat
- Saint Tikhon of Zadonsk, bishop of Voronezh

== Deaths ==
- 26 November - Willem Mons was executed.
