= 1785 in Russia =

Events from the year 1785 in Russia

== Incumbents ==
- Monarch – Catherine II

== Events ==
- Babolovo Palace completed
- Battle of the Sunja - Russian defeat in Chechen uprising led by Sheikh Mansur
- Billings Expedition authorized to search for the Northeast Passage
- Caucasus Viceroyalty (1785–96) established
- Charter to the Gentry codified rights of nobility
- City Dumas established in Moscow, Saint Petersburg, and other cities by imperial decree
- Great Gostiny Dvor shopping arcade opened in Saint Petersburg
- Hermitage Theatre opened
- Odigitrievsky Cathedral completed
- Trinity Church, Pervitino founded

== Births ==
- Stepan Nikitich Begichev - soldier and memoirist
- Dmitry Bludov - government official and writer
- Nikolai Islenev - general
- Stepan Khilkov - general
- Dorothea Lieven - noblewoman, socialite
- Elena Aleksandrovna Naryshkina - noblewoman
- Lev Naryshkin - general
- Anna Orlova-Chesmenskaya - noblewoman, philanthropist
- Konstantin von Benckendorff - diplomat and general
- Hans Karl von Diebitsch - general

== Deaths ==
- Praskovya Bruce - lady-in-waiting and confidant of Catherine the Great
- Ivan Firsov - painter
- Ivan Grigorovich-Barsky - architect
