= 1756 in Russia =

Events from the year 1756 in Russia

== Incumbents ==
- Monarch – Elizabeth

== Events ==
- Foundation of the Imperial Theatres

== Deaths ==
- 19 March - Maria Choglokova, courtier (born 1723)
- Aksinya Sergeeva
