= 1815 in Russia =

Events from the year 1815 in Russia

== Incumbents ==
- Monarch – Alexander I

== Events ==
- His Imperial Majesty's Own Chancellery
- Quadruple Alliance (1815)
- Lazarev Institute of Oriental Languages
- Mir yeshiva (Belarus)

== Births ==
- Pavel Fedotov - famous realist painter
