= 1723 in Russia =

Events from the year 1723 in Russia

== Incumbents ==
- Monarch – Peter I

== Events ==
- 21 September [O.S. 12 September] 1723: The Treaty of Saint Petersburg (1723) concluded the Russo-Persian War of 1722–1723 between Imperial Russia and Safavid Iran.

== Births ==
- Maria Choglokova, courtier (born 1756)
