= 1789 in Russia =

Events from the year 1789 in Russia

== Incumbents ==
- Monarch – Catherine II

== Events ==
- Russo-Swedish War (1788–1790)
  - June 13 - Battle of Porrassalmi
  - July 26 - Battle of Öland (1789)
  - August 24 - Battle of Svensksund (1789)
  - September 30 - Battle of Elgsö
- Russo-Turkish War (1787–1792)
  - August 1 - Battle of Focșani
  - September 22 - Battle of Rymnik
- Kirov Plant (factory) established
- Mykolaiv (city) founded
- Moscow Gostiny Dvor shopping mall rebuilt
- St. Vladimir's Cathedral (St. Petersburg)
- Tauride Palace built

== Births ==
- Thaddeus Bulgarin - writer and publisher
- Prince Constantine of Imereti (1789–1844) - Georgian prince, general in Russian service
- Johann Cornies - Prussian Mennonite settler and agricultural reformer
- Pavel Gagarin - statesman
- Fedor Mirkovich - general
- Dmitri Osten-Sacken - Baltic German/Russian general
- Maria Szymanowska - Polish composer and pianist who settled in St. Petersburg
- Mikhail Tikhanov - artist
- Nikolay Turgenev - economist and political theorist

== Deaths ==
- Nikita Akinfiyevich Demidov, industrialist, landowner, scientist
- Semyon Desnitsky, legal scholar
