= 1718 in Russia =

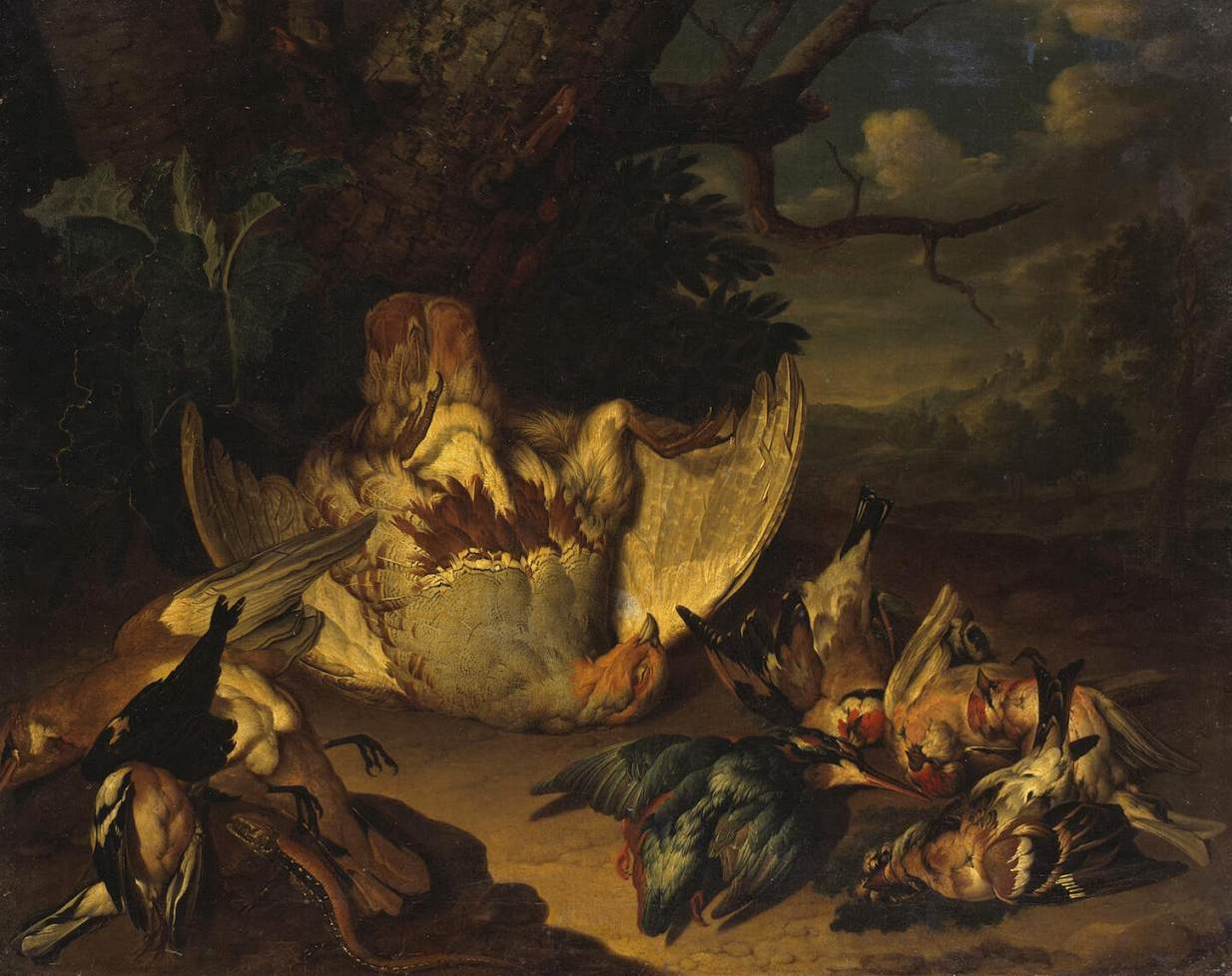
Philipp Ferdinand de Hamilton - Dead Game - WGA11200

Events from the year 1718 in Russia

== Incumbents ==
- Monarch – Peter I

== Events ==
- 12 April - The Neva Yacht Club is founded
- 12 December - The Admiralty Board is established

== Births ==
- 20 August - Natalia Petrovna, grand duchess, daughter of Peter I (d. 1725)
- 18 September - Nikita Ivanovich Panin, statesman (d. 1783)
- 17 November - Alexander Mikhailovich Golitsyn, prince, field-marshal, Governor of St. Petersburg (d. 1783)
- 18 December - Anna Leopoldovna, briefly regent of Russia (d. 1746)

== Deaths ==
- 1 May - Tsarevna Catherine Alekseyevna of Russia (b. 1658)
- 26 June - Alexei Petrovich, Tsarevich of Russia (b. 1690)

Date unknown

- Andrey Khilkov, ambassador to Sweden (b. 1767)
- Alexander Kikin, adviser to Tsarevich Alexei (b. c. 1670)
