= 1771 in Russia =

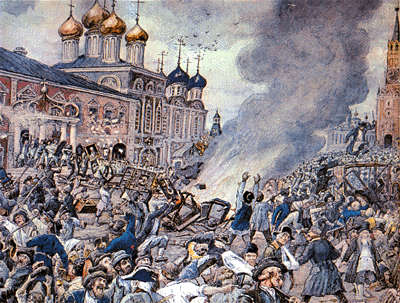
Plague Riot in Moscow, 1771

Events from the year 1771 in Russia

== Incumbents ==
- Monarch – Catherine II

== Events ==
- Moscow plague riot of 1771
- Pyatnitskoye cemetery

== Births ==
- 12 October [O.S. 1 October] 1771 - Count Mikhail Miloradovich, Russian general of Serbian origin, prominent during the Napoleonic Wars. (d. 1825)

== Deaths ==
- 29 April - Francesco Bartolomeo Rastrelli, Italian architect who worked mainly in Russia. (b. 1700)
