= 1721 in Russia =

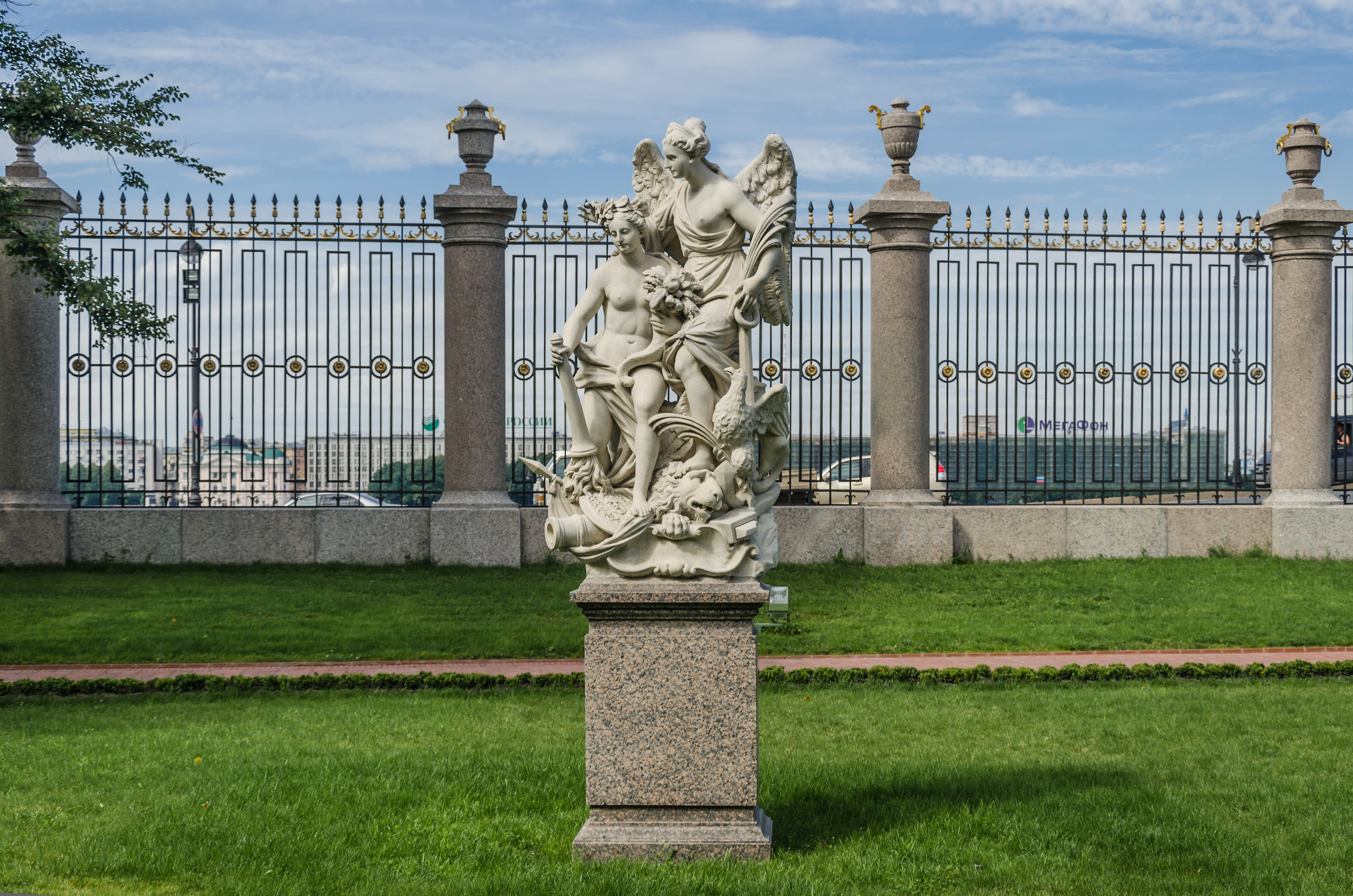
Treaty of Nystad in Summer Garden

This article lists the events in 1721 in Russia.

== Incumbents ==
- Monarch – Peter I - oversaw the reorganization of the Tsardom of Russia into the Russian Empire.

== Events ==
- Signing of the Treaty of Nystad - final peace treaty of the Great Northern War, officially ending it.
