= 1726 in Russia =

Events from the year 1726 in Russia

== Incumbents ==
- Monarch – Catherine I

== Events ==
- Smolensk Governorate
- Supreme Privy Council

== Births ==
- Aksinya Sergeeva
