= 1767 in Russia =

Events from the year 1767 in Russia

== Incumbents ==
- Monarch – Catherine II

== Events ==
- Dzelzava Manor
- Kambarka Engineering Works
- St Andrew's Church, Kiev

== Births ==
- 13 April - Artemy Vedel, composer (died 1808)
