= 1762 in Russia =

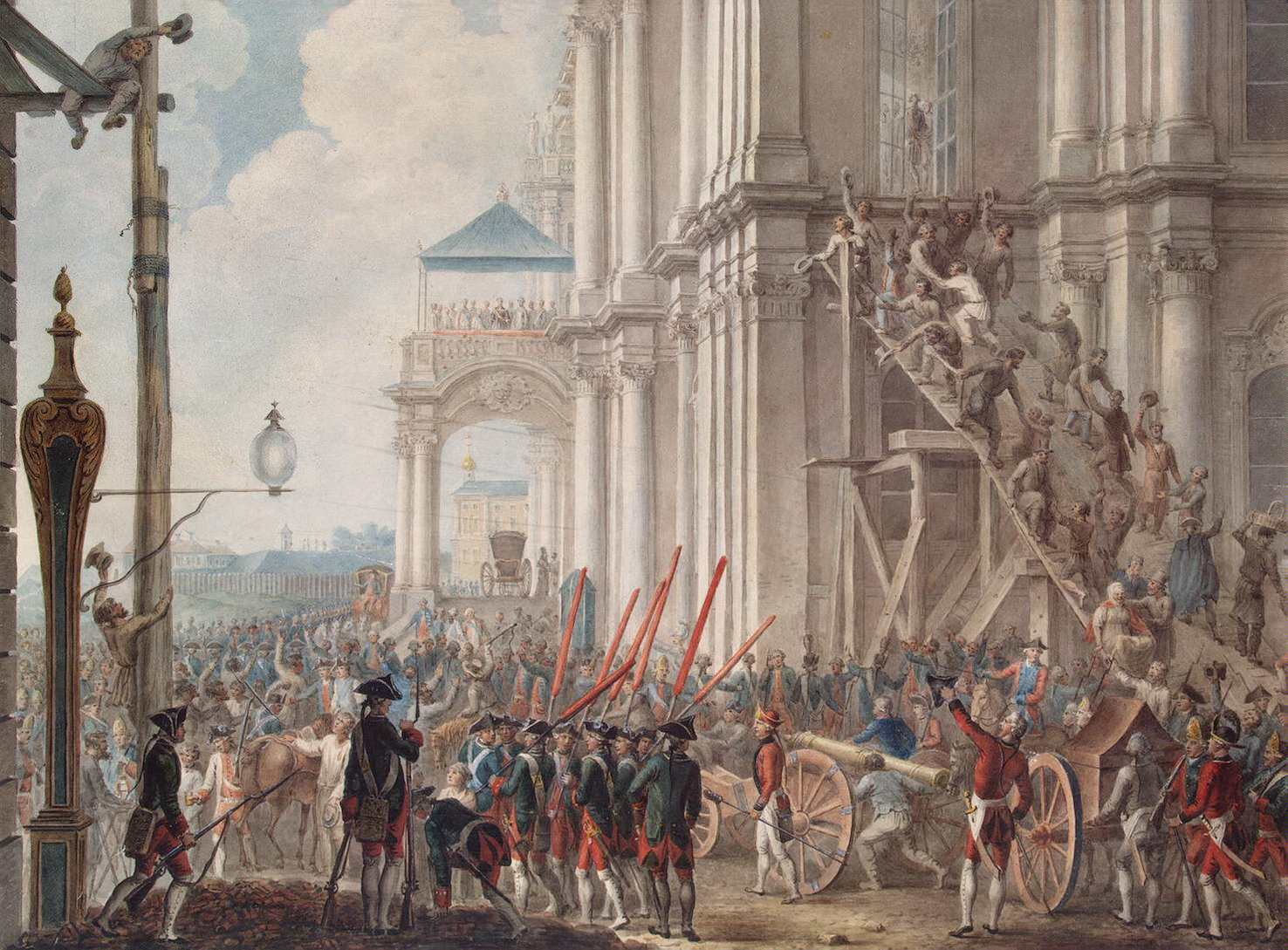
Екатерина на балконе

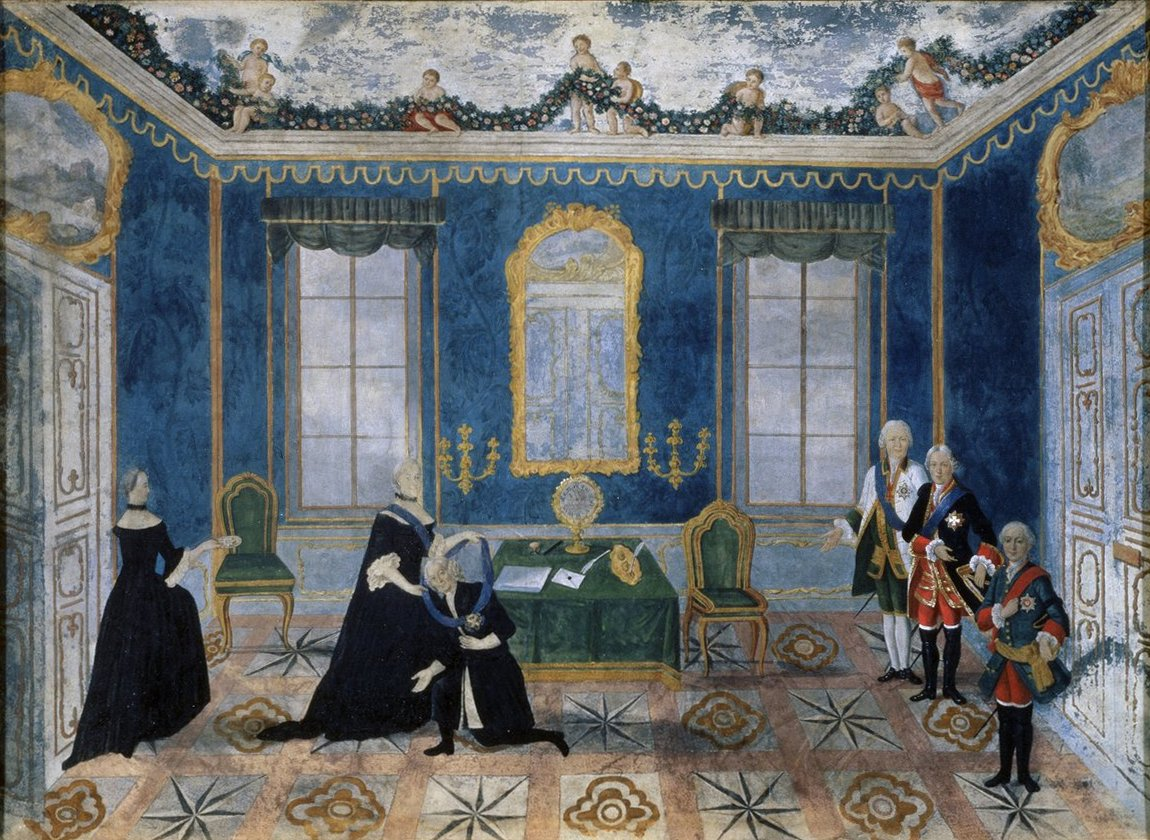
EII&Bestuzhev-Rumin

Events from the year 1762 in Russia

== Incumbents ==
- Monarch – Elizabeth (until January 5), Peter III (January 5 – July 9), Catherine II (after July 9)

== Events ==
- January 5 – Peter III succeeds Empress Elisabeth of Russia. Peter immediately opens peace negotiations with Prussia.
- May 15 – The Treaty of Saint Petersburg (1762) ends the war between Russia and the Prussia.
- July 9 – Catherine II deposes her husband Emperor Peter III and becomes empress regnant of Russia.

== Births ==
- Elizabeth Divov (d. 1813)
- Arina Sobakina

== Deaths ==
- Elizabeth of Russia
- Peter III of Russia
