= 1773 in Russia =

Events from the year 1773 in Russia

== Incumbents ==
- Monarch – Catherine II

== Events ==
- National Mineral Resources University
- Bazilionai parish school
- Pugachev's Rebellion begins.
- The Russian Occupation of Beirut: Capitalizing on the ongoing Russo-Turkish War (1768–1774), the Russian fleet formed alliances with local rulers and occupied the port of Beirut
- Treaty of Tsarskoye Selo (June 1, 1773): Russia signed a major territorial and dynastic treaty with Denmark-Norway.

== Births ==
- Vasily Karazin was prominent scholar, enlightener, founder of Kharkiv University.
- Alexander Lvovich Davydov - a Russian Army major general who served during the Napoleonic Wars and the War of the Third and Sixth Coalitions.

== Deaths ==
- Zakhar Ivanovich Kharlov - Commandant of the Nizhneozernoye Fortress, executed by rebel forces after the fortress fell in September 1773.
- Tatiana Grigorievna Kharlova - Russian noblewoman and wife of fortress commandant Zakhar Ivanovich Kharlov, killed during the rebellion.
- Grigory Mironovich Elagin - Commandant of the Tatishchevo Fortress and father of Tatiana Kharlova, executed during the rebel takeover.
