= 1751 in Russia =

Events from the year 1751 in Russia

== Incumbents ==
- Monarch – Elizabeth
- Chancellor - Alexey Bestuzhev-Ryumin

== Events ==
- Kamen-na-Obi
