= 1736 in Russia =

The following events occurred in Russia in the year 1736.

== Incumbents ==
- Monarch – Anna

== Events ==
- Siege of Perekop (1736)

== Births ==
- Nikolai Saltykov, Imperial Field Marshal (d. 1816)
- Fyodor Rokotov, painter (d. 1808)
