= 1752 in Russia =

Events from the year 1752 in Russia

== Incumbents ==
- Monarch – Elizabeth

== Events ==
City fire - May 5-6 - Fire destroys 18,000 houses in Moscow

== Births ==
- January 18 – Alexander Kurakin, Russian diplomat (d. 1818)
- August 11 – Alexander Tormasov, Russian general (d. 1819)
- November 2 – Andrey Razumovsky, Russian diplomat (d. 1836)
