= 1750 in Russia =

Events from the year 1750 in Russia

== Incumbents ==
- Monarch – Elizabeth

== Events ==
- Westernization of Russia

== Deaths ==
- January 16 — Ivan Trubetskoy, Russian field marshal (b.1667)
- Vasily Tatishchev
