= 1760 in Russia =

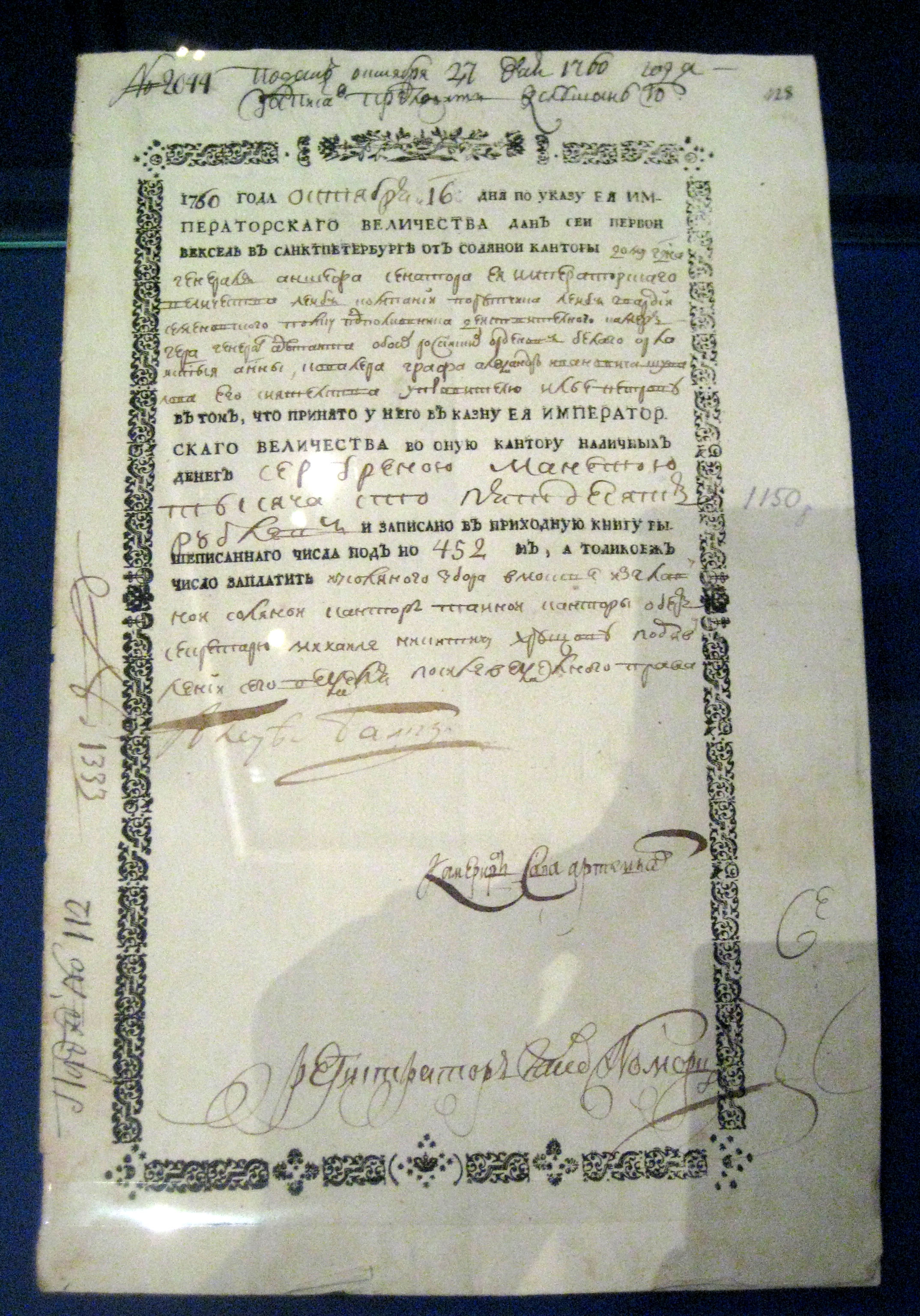
Salt bill to A.I. Shuvalov (1760, GIM)

Events from the year 1760 in Russia

== Incumbents ==
- Monarch – Elizabeth

== Events ==
See also: Seven Years' War

- June 23 – Russian forces overpowered a Prussian force in what is now Kamienna Góra, Poland, as part of the Seven Years' War.
- July 12 – Russian forces besiege Dresden.
- October 9 – Russian and Austrian forces occupy Berlin for three days (1760 raid on Berlin).

== Births ==
- Julia Adlerberg
- Mikhail Bulatov
- Christine Rakhmanov
