= 1725 in Russia =

Events from the year 1725 in Russia

== Incumbents ==
- Monarch – Peter I (until February 8), Catherine I (from February 8)

== Births ==
- Pyotr Rumyantsev (died 1796)

== Deaths ==
- Peter I, monarch (born 1672)
