= 1735 in Russia =

The Events That Took Place in 1735, Russia

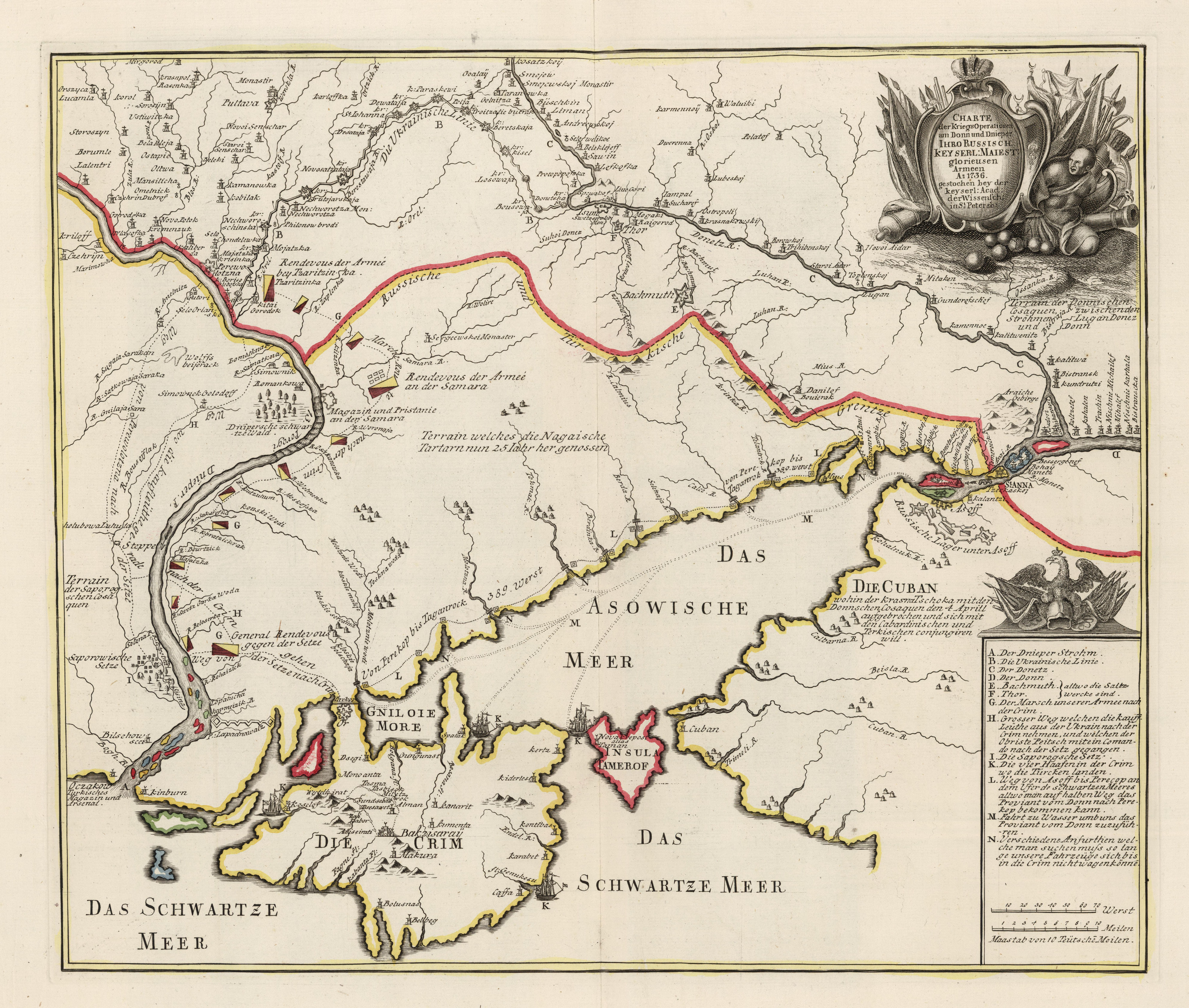
Russian campaign 1736

== Incumbents ==
- Monarch – Anna

== Events ==
- The Treaty of Ganja was a peace agreement signed in March 1735 between the Russian empire and the Persian empire (under Nader Shah) in the city of Ganja (in modern-day Azerbaijan). The treaty ended hostilities between the two powers and played a key role in reshaping territorial control in the Caucasus region.
- The Austro-Russian–Turkish War (1735–39) begins: In 1735, Russia entered into conflict with the Ottoman Empire, marking the start of the Austro-Russian-Turkish War (1735-1739) This was initiated partly due to Russian ambitions to expand southward and to support Austria against the Ottomans.
- Crimean Campaigns: Russian forces began military operations against the Crimean Khanate, an Ottoman vassal. In this year, the Russian army launched the First Crimean Campaign, attempting to weaken the Khanate and gain access to the Black Sea. However, the campaign faced logistical difficulties with disease, limiting its success.
- Alliance with Austria: Russia and Austria strengthened their alliance against the Ottoman Empire, coordinating their military efforts for the upcoming years of war.

== Births ==
- Pyotr Krechetnikov (born 1735 - died 1800) - Russian general who would later participate in the Russo-Turkish wars and the suppression of uprisings in Poland.

== Deaths ==
- Andrey Osterman's wife, Anna Ivanona Zhemchugova, is believed to have died around this time, although exact details are unclear. She was connected to one of the most influential statesmen in Anna's court.
