= 1774 in Russia =

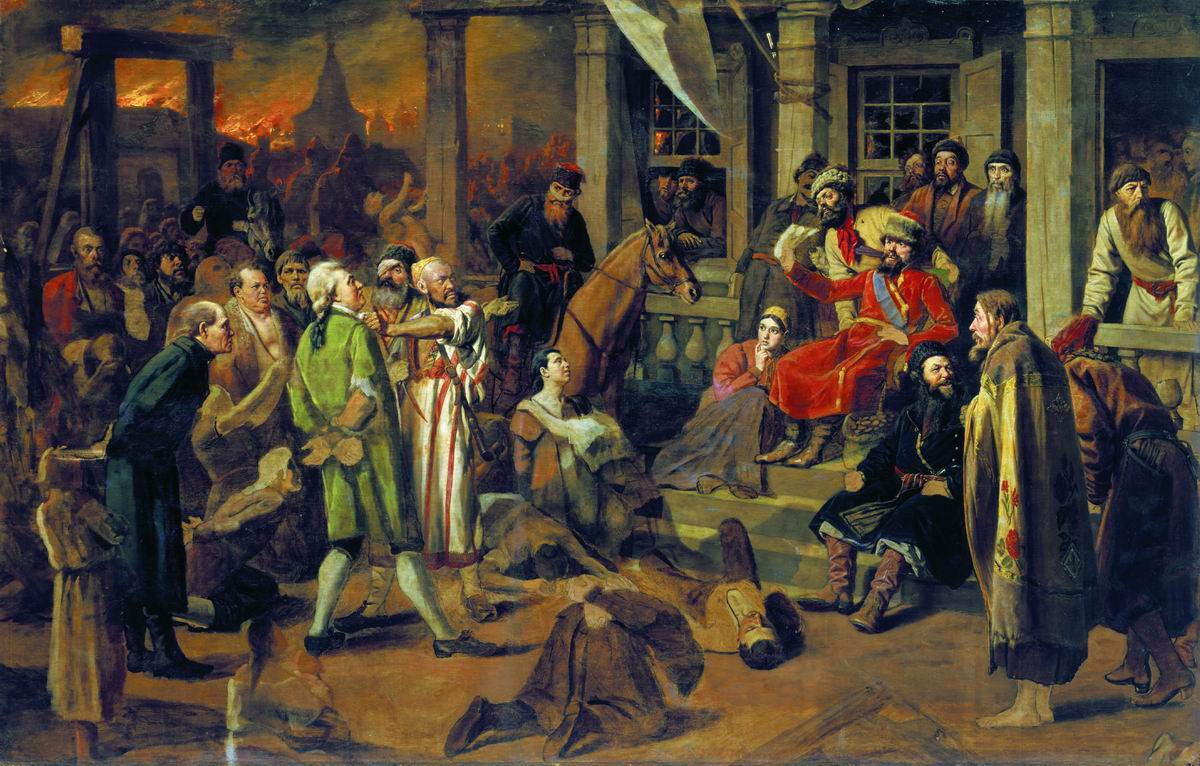
Перов Суд Пугачева (ГИМ)

Events from the year 1774 in Russia

== Incumbents ==
- Monarch – Catherine II

== Events ==
- March 26 – The siege of Orenburg ends after government forces defeat Pugachev’s rebels.
- April 2 – Government forces defeat Pugachev’s army at the Battle of Tatishchevo.
- June 20 – Russo-Turkish War: Russian forces commanded by Alexander Suvorov defeat the Ottoman army at the Battle of Kozludzha.
- June 20 – Russian and Ottoman naval forces fight the first Battle of Kerch Strait.
- July 9 – A second naval battle occurs near the Kerch Strait, after which the Ottoman fleet withdraws.
- July 12–15 – Pugachev’s Rebellion: Rebel forces led by Yemelyan Pugachev attack Kazan but are defeated by government troops at the Battle of Kazan.
- July 21 – Russia and the Ottoman Empire sign the Treaty of Küçük Kaynarca, ending the Russo-Turkish War of 1768–1774.
- August 21 – Government forces defeat Pugachev’s rebels at the Battle of Tsaritsyn.
- September 14 – Yemelyan Pugachev is captured, effectively ending the main phase of the rebellion.
- November 24 – Imperial authorities capture Salawat Yulayev, a major Bashkir leader in Pugachev’s Rebellion.
- December 19 – Catherine II announces the completion of the investigation into Pugachev and orders the Senate to conduct his trial.
- Throughout the year – Pugachev’s Rebellion continues across areas of the Russian Empire.

== Births ==
- January 18 – Anna Bunina, Russian poet (d. 1829)
- March 10 – David Semyonovich Abamelik, Russian-Armenian major general (d. 1833)
- March 20 – Alexandra Petrovna Golitsyna, Russian noblewoman and historian (d. 1842)
- May 6 – Christoph von Lieven, Russian general and prince (d. 1839)
- June 18 – Pavel Alexandrovich Stroganov, Russian military commander and statesman (d. 1817)
- November 16 – Georg Ludwig Cancrin, Russian finance minister (d. 1845)
- Date unknown – Pyotr Zlov, Russian actor and bass singer (d. 1823)

== Deaths ==
- April 20 – Aleksandr Bibikov, Russian statesman and military officer (b. 1729)
- May 4 – Anthony Ulrich, Duke of Brunswick, Russian general (b. 1714)
- July 27 – Samuel Gottlieb Gmelin, German naturalist and explorer in Russian service (b. 1744)
- September 14 – Yakov von Brandt, Russian general and government official.
- October 15 – Dmitry Ukhtomsky, Russian architect (b. 1719)
- November 1 – Johan Peter Falk, Swedish botanist and explorer in Russian service (b. 1732)
