= 1731 in Russia =

Events from the year 1731 in Russia

== Incumbents ==
- Monarch – Anna

== Events ==
- 19 February – Empress Anna Ioannovna signed a decree accepting the Young Horde of the Kazakh Khanate under Russian protection. This act marked the beginning of Kazakhstan's gradual integration into the Russian Empire.
- The Corps of Cadets is founded to provide military education and training.
- The Ladoga Canal, connecting the Volga River to the Baltic Sea, is completed.
- 10 May - Pacific Fleet is established as part of the Imperial Russian Navy
- 4 November - Empress Anna Ioannovna establishes the Cabinet of Ministers, a supreme state body that functioned until December 23, 1741.
