= 1746 in Russia =

Events from the year 1746 in Russia

== Incumbents ==
- Monarch – Elizabeth

== Births ==
- Sophia Razumovskaya, courtier (b. 1803)
