= 1739 in Russia =

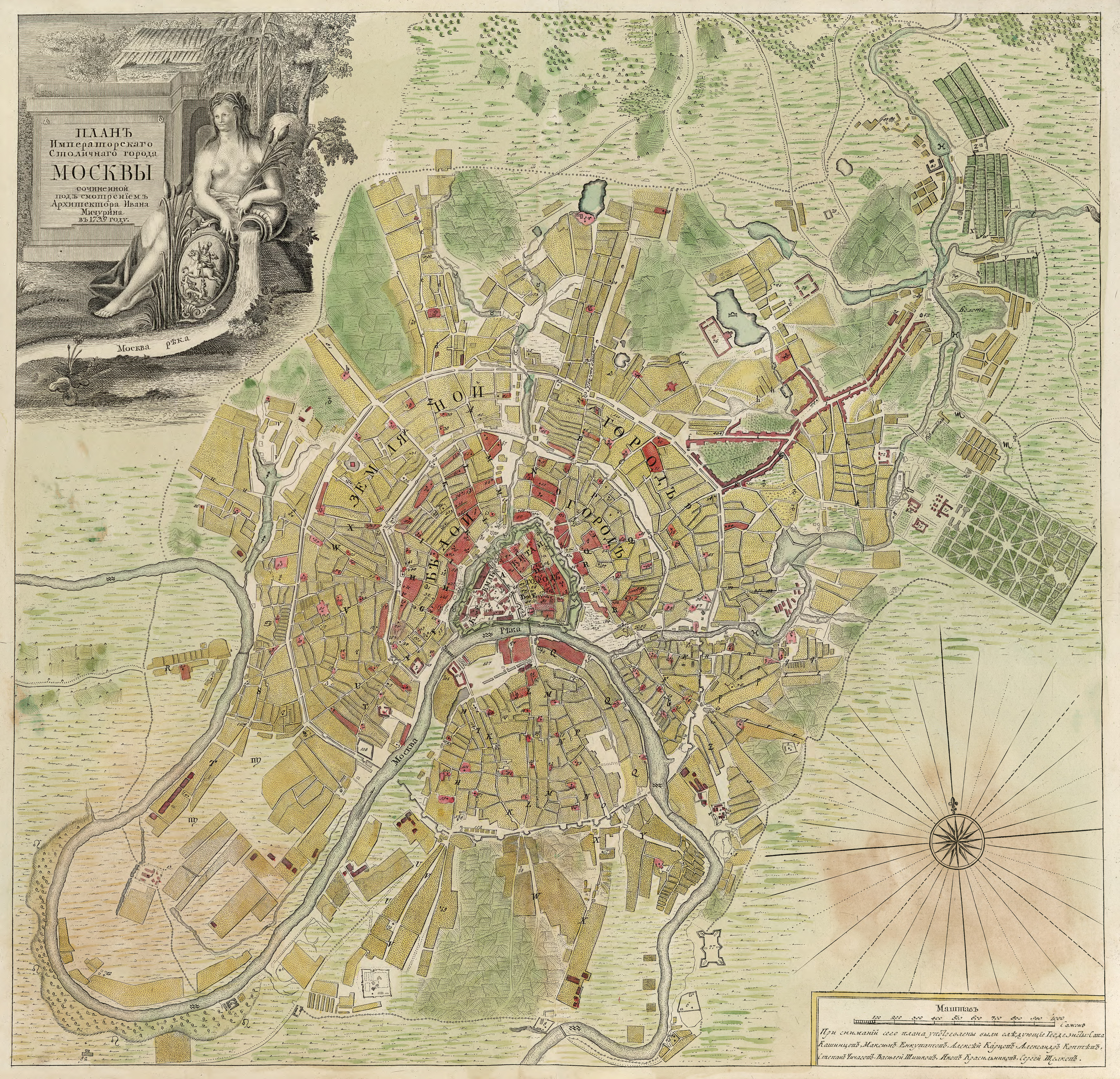
Moscow 1739 (Michurin Map)

Events from the year 1739 in Russia

== Incumbents ==
- Monarch – Anna

== Events ==
- Austro-Russian–Turkish War (1735–39)
- Battle of Stavuchany
- Minusinsk
- Treaty of Niš (1739)

== Births ==
- October 11 - Grigory Potemkin (died 1791)
