= 1848 in Russia =

Events from the year 1848 in Russia

== Incumbents ==
- Monarch – Nicholas I

== Events ==
- Nicholas I invades the Danubian principalities.
- Nicholas I sets up a secret committee to intensify censorship of the press.
- Russia, despite being largely unaffected by the revolutions of 1848, sends armies to aid the Habsburgs in the Hungarian revolution of 1848.
- Russia suffers major disasters such as a major cholera epidemic, a bad harvest, and an increase in fires due to weather.

== Births ==
- January 25 — Ekaterina Vazem, Russian ballet dancer, teacher
- April 7 — Anna Brenko, Russian actress, director, playwright, theater worker

== Deaths ==
- 7 June – Vissarion Belinsky, Russian literary critic (born 1811)
