= 1765 in Russia =

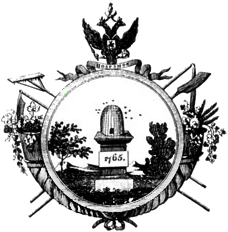
Gerbv

Events from 1765 in Russia

== Incumbents ==
- Monarch – Catherine II

== Events ==
- Foundation of the Novodevichii Institute.
- Free Economic Society was founded.
- Catherine II promulgated the "Manifesto on the Empire’s General Land Survey".
- The special “Gypsy” regiments were abolished and Roma then registered in the existing “sotni” (Cossack squadrons) and regiments, thus they were given civil rights like the rest of the population.
- Alexander Bezborodko was appointed the Chief of the Office of Little Russia Governor-General Count Peter Rumyantsev.

== Births ==
- Vasily Malinovsky, Russian diplomat (d. 1814)
- Pyotr Bagration, Russian general (d. 1812)
- Timofei Fedorovic Osipovsky, Russian mathematician (d. 1832)
- Ivan Aleksandrovich Kuskov, Manager of Fort Ross (d. 1823)
- Nikita Ivanovich Panin (b 29 September 1718) One of Catherine the Greaet's closest advisers, He was also the chief architect of Russian Foreign Policy
- Kirill Razumovsky ( 1728-1803). Field Marshall. President of the Russian Academy of Sciences
- Grigory Grigoryevich (b. 1734) Miletary leader and Cathererine's favourite courtier
- Alexei Grigoryevich Orlov (b. 1737). younger brother to Grigory and Military commander and naval strategsist

== Deaths ==
- April 15 – Mikhail Lomonosov, Russian author and scientist (b. 1711)
