= 1825 in Russia =

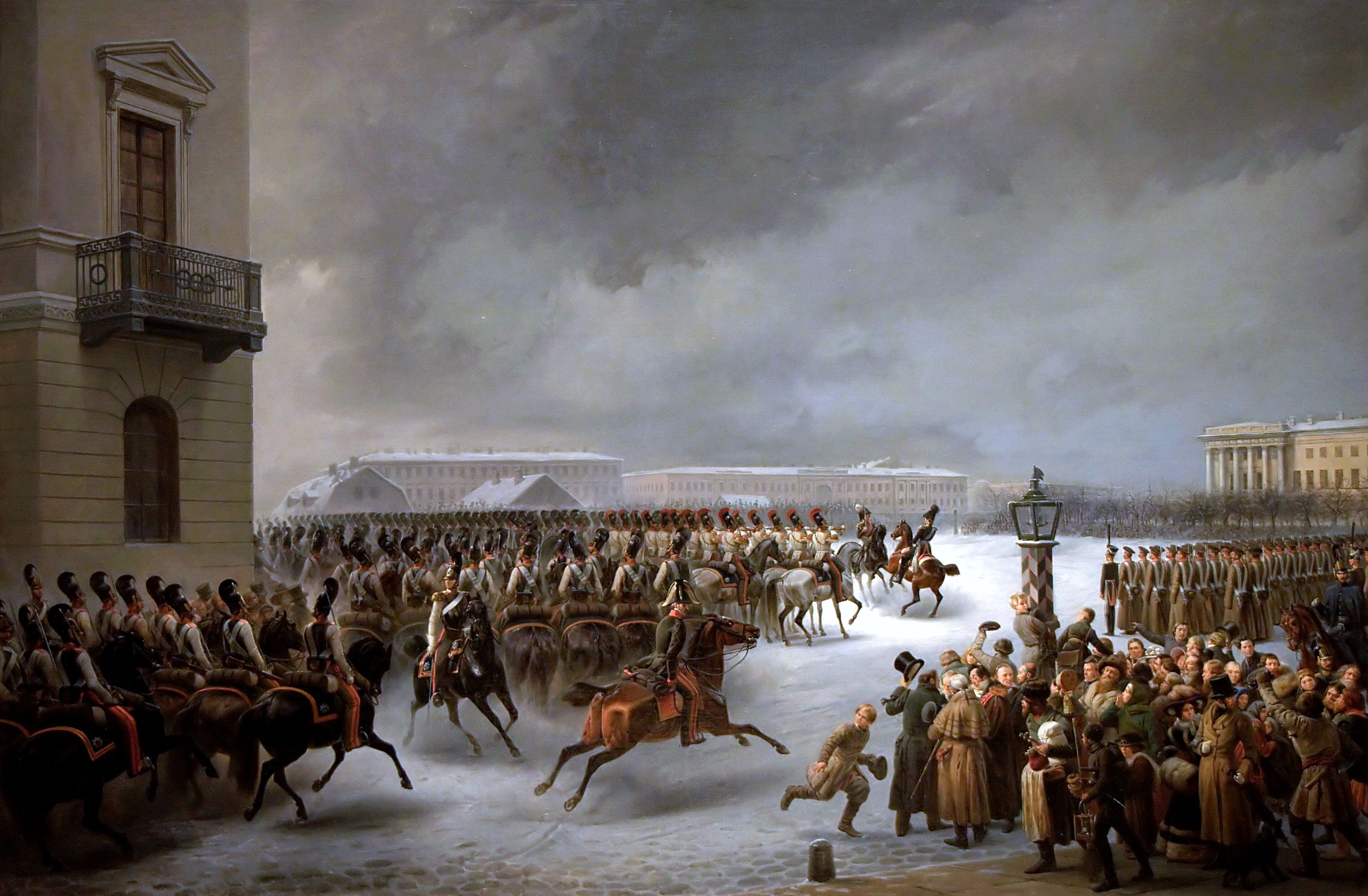
Decembrist Revolt, a painting by Vasily Timm

Events from the year 1825 in Russia

== Incumbents ==
- Monarch – Alexander I (until December 1), Nicholas I (after December 1)

== Events ==
- Third Section of His Imperial Majesty's Own Chancellery
- December 1 (November 19 O.S.) – Nicholas I succeeds his brother Alexander I, as emperor.
- December 26 (December 14 O.S.) – 3000 Imperial Russian Army officers stage the Decembrist Revolt against Nicholas's accession in Saint Petersburg. The rebellion, however, is successfully suppressed by the government.

== Births ==
- December 8, 1825 - Andrey Nikolayevich Beketov, the "father of Russian botanists" born.

== Deaths ==
- 1 December [O.S. 19 November] 1825 - Alexander I of Russia (b. 1777)
- December 27 [O.S. December 15] 1825 - Count Mikhail Miloradovich, Russian general of Serbian origin, prominent during the Napoleonic Wars. (b. 1771)

пятерых повесили, Пушкин лично каждого знал, в том числе и Рылеев, к которому Пушкин собирался накануне восстания
