= 1715 in Russia =

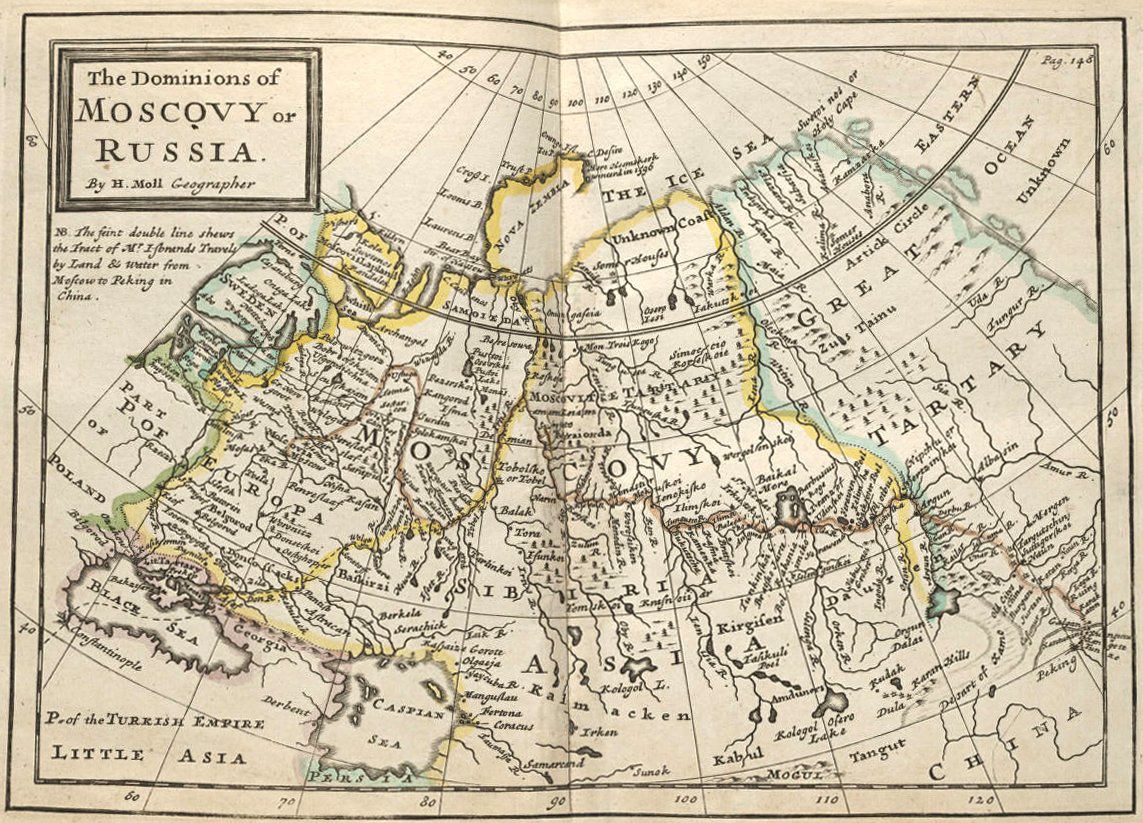
Muscovy1715

Events from the year 1715 in Russia

== Incumbents ==
- Monarch – Peter I

== Births ==
- Peter II of Russia
- Ekaterina Chernysheva, courtier (died 1779)

== Deaths ==
- John of Tobolsk
