= 1783 in Russia =

Events from the year 1783 in Russia

== Incumbents ==
- Monarch – Catherine II

== Events ==
- Annexation of Crimea by the Russian Empire
- Black Sea Fleet founded
- Bolshoi Theatre, Saint Petersburg first built
- Church of St. Catherine (Saint Petersburg) completed
- Kuban Nogai Uprising
- Malo-Kalinkin Bridge (St. Petersburg) built
- Mariinsky Theatre Orchestra founded
- Russian Academy founded
- Sevastopol Naval Base completed
- Treaty of Georgievsk - Georgian kingdom of Kartli-Kakheti becomes a Russian protectorate
- Vladimir Central Prison founded

== Births ==
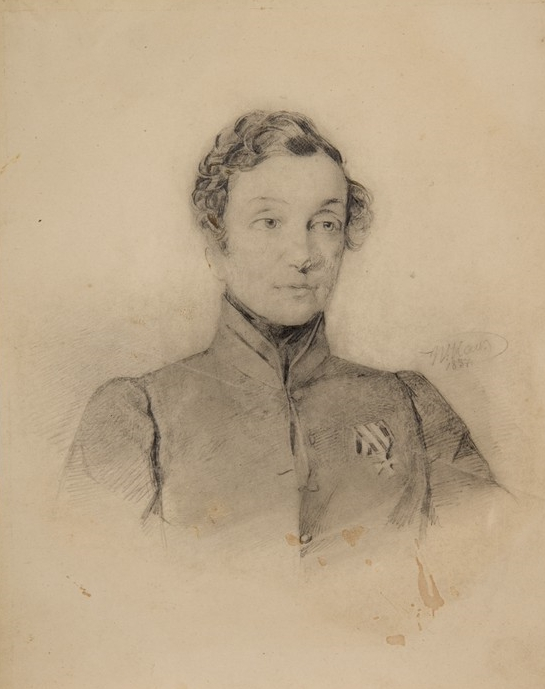
Nasezhda Durova (1783-1866)

- Catherine Bagration - princess known for eccentric life abroad
- Andrej Dudrovich - philosopher, president of Kharkov University
- Nadezhda Durova - soldier
- Alexander Ivanovich Galich - philosopher and writer
- Paisi Kaysarov - general
- Pyotr Kozlovsky - diplomat and writer
- Louis Alexandre Andrault de Langeron - French emigre, general
- Grand Duchess Alexandra Pavlovna of Russia - daughter of Paul I of Russia
- Alexander Sablukov - general, inventor
- Fyodor Shubin - soldier, founder of Nur-Sultan
- Fyodor Petrovich Tolstoy - artist
- Friedrich Caspar von Geismar - Austrian-German who became Russian general
- Friedrich von Rüdiger - general
- Vasily Zhukovsky - poet, imperial tutor

== Deaths ==
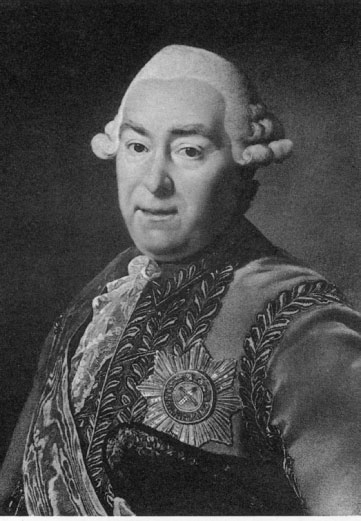
Field Marshal Aleksandr Mikhailovich Golitsyn, 1718-1783

- Alexander Ablesimov - writer
- Alexander Mikhailovich Golitsyn - general and statesman
- Gerhard Friedrich Müller - ethnographer and historian
- Grigory Orlov - favorite of Catherine the Great
- Nikita Ivanovich Panin - advisor to Catherine the Great
- Tikhon of Zadonsk - bishop, writer, saint
