= 1743 in Russia =

Events from the year 1743 in Russia

== Incumbents ==
- Monarch – Elizabeth

== Births ==
- June 23 - Catherine Shuvalova, Russian courtier. (d. 1816)
