= 1722 in Russia =

Events from the year 1722 in Russia

== Incumbents ==
- Monarch – Peter I

== Events ==
- 7 August [O.S. 27 July] 1722: The Russo-Persian War begins.
- November 1722: Peter I establish the Caspian Flotilla

== Births ==
- Anna Matyushkina, courtier (d. 1804)
- Anna Vorontsova
- Paisius Velichkovsky
- Alexander Glebov

== Deaths ==
- Stefan Yavorsky
- solomondia timofeevna Dubrovskaya was a wife of Pyotr Andreyevich a Russian statesman and diplomat.
