= 1818 in Russia =

Events from the year 1818 in Russia

== Incumbents ==
- Monarch – Alexander I

== Events ==
- Change of command at the Russian-American Company (RAC)
- Inauguration of the Monument to Minin and Pozharski
- Asiatic Museum Foundation
- Launch of Otechestvennye Zapiski (Memories of the Homeland)

== Births ==
- 29 April [O.S. 17 April] 1881 - Alexander II of Russia, Emperor of Russia. (d. 1881)
- 23 August - Aleksey Khludov, Old believer merchant. (d.1882)
- November 9 - Ivan Turgenev, One of the most celebrated novelists, poets, and playwrights in Russian literature. (d. 1883)
- November 16 - Konstantin Kavelin, Historian, jurist and sociologist of early Russian liberalism
