= 1755 in Russia =

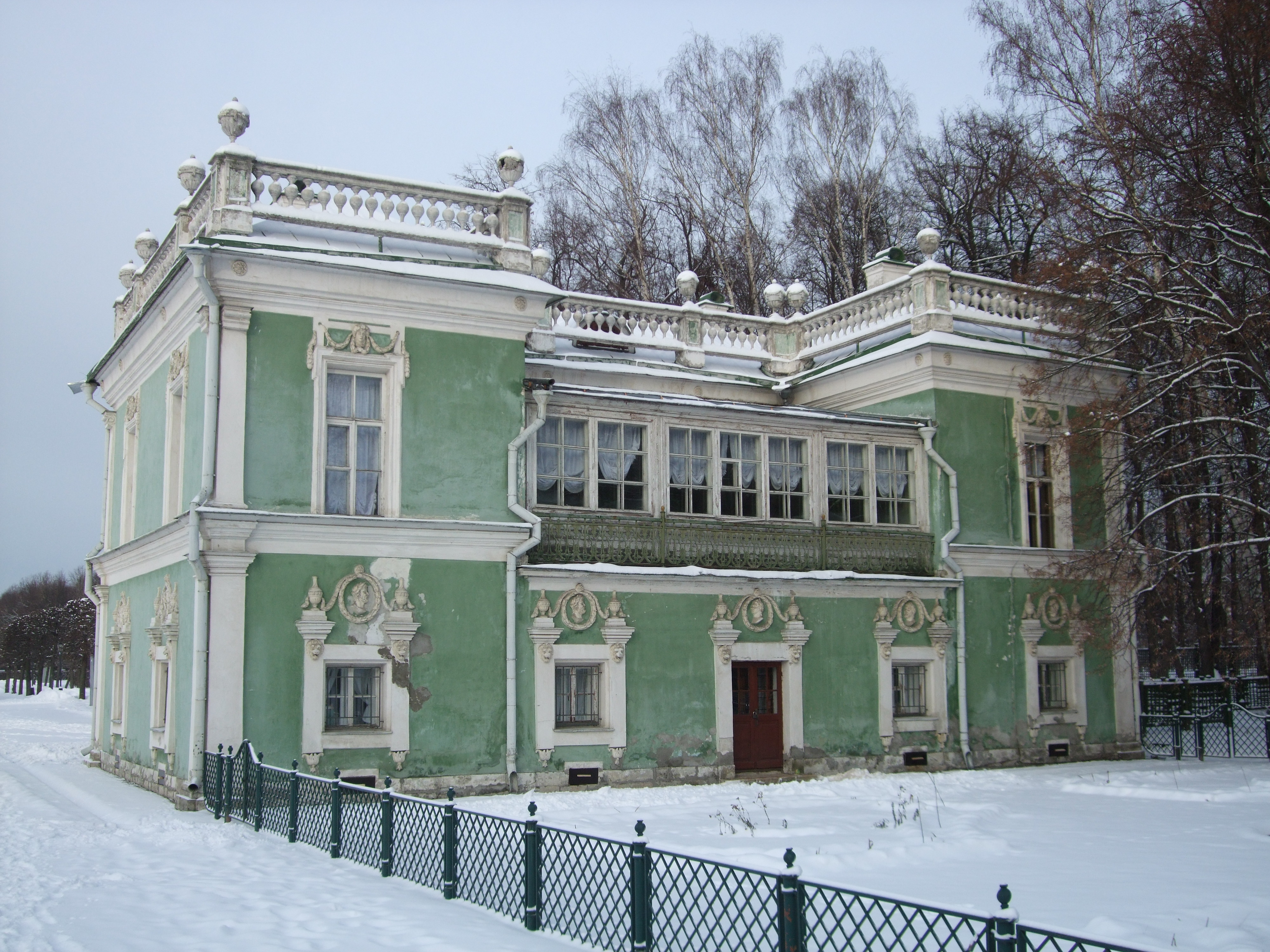
Kuskovo ItalianCottage reverse 2012

Events from the year 1755 in Russia

== Incumbents ==
- Monarch – Elizabeth

== Events ==
- 23 January (O.S. 12 January) - Empress Elizabeth signs a decree establishing Moscow University, the first university in Russia, on the initiative of Mikhail Lomonosov and Ivan Shuvalov.

== Births ==
- * 25 June – Natalia Alexeievna (Wilhelmina of Hesse-Darmstadt), Tsarevna of Russia (d. 1776)

== Deaths ==
- Anastasija Trubetskaya, courtier (born 1700)
