= List of monuments of Tolyatti =

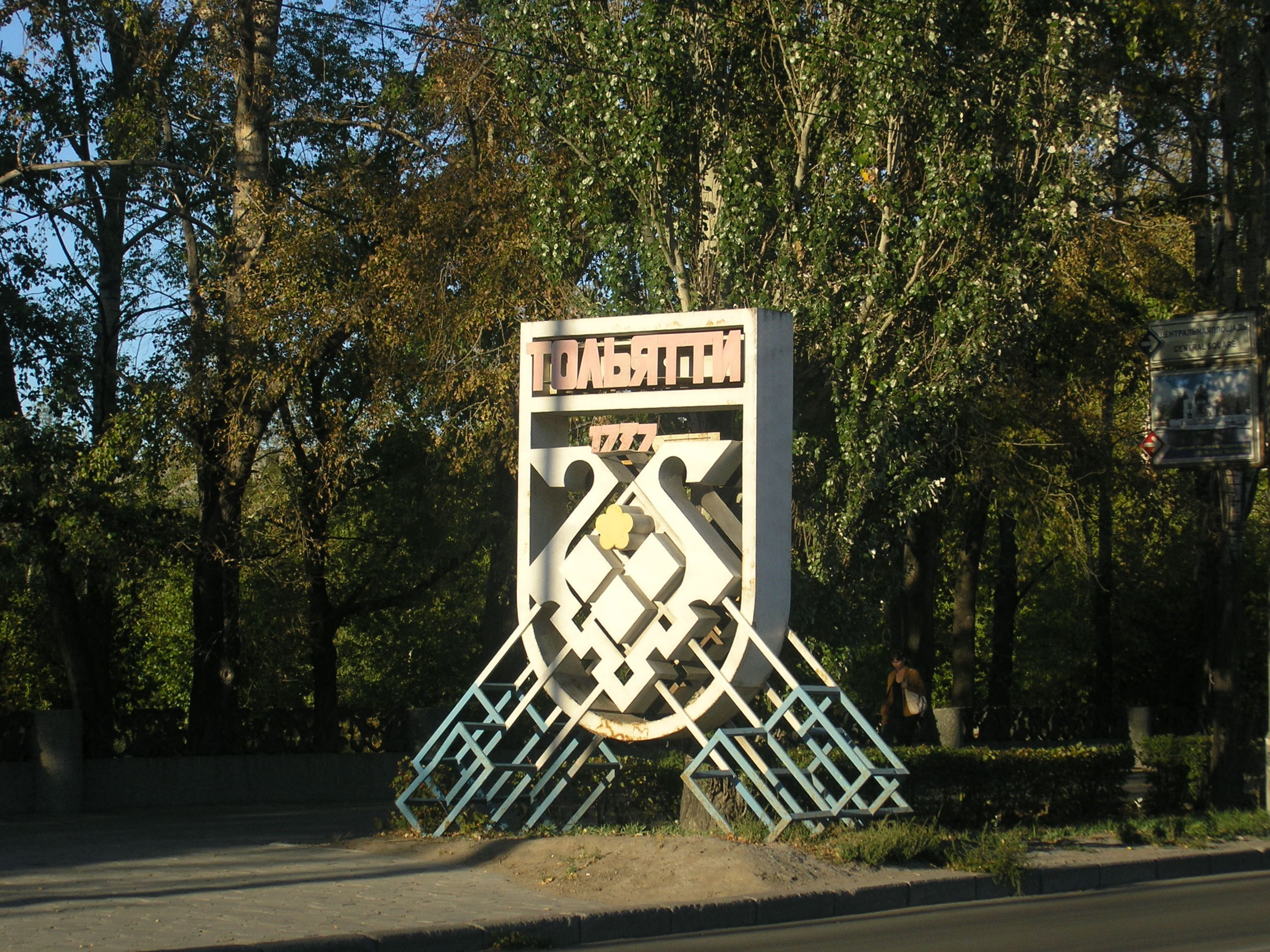
Emblem of the city in sculpture, erected for the city's 250th anniversary in 1987

This is a list of monuments in Tolyatti, a city in the Samara province of Russia. Many of the entries on this list are officially protected by having formal status as monuments, but not all – some are just monuments in the generic sense of being memorials, or artwork of monumental size.

The modern history of Tolyatti only begins in the mid-1950s. Before that, the city – then called Stavropol-on-Don – was located where the Kuybyshev Reservoir now stands; it was moved to its present location before the filling of the reservoir, so there is little architecture from before then, although a few small buildings were preserved from the old Stavropol by being moved.

The main document regulating the list of monuments and their use and protection has long been a 2000 decree from the Tolyatti City Council.

By this decree, Tolyatti monuments are divided into five categories: historical monuments, architectural monuments, monumental art, memorials, and documentary monuments (that is, historical documents), and into three classes: monuments of national significance, monuments of regional significance, and monuments of local significance. The only monuments of national significance in Tolyatti are documents, which are stored at City Hall.

New monuments were to be added to the roster after assessment by experts from the Tolyatti Museum of Local History followed by a resolution from the City Council. However, the registry did not increase by a single monument after its creation, and in December 2011 the decree was revoked.

In early 2013, the Tolyatti city government released a report on the work done in Tolyatti for the conservation, use, and promotion of objects of cultural heritage and work of monumental and decorative art. This report included a suggestion for a new, substantially modified list of monuments. However, as of 2015 no legislation has been passed on the municipal level to implement this, although a number of monuments are protected under the aegis of the Samara provincial government.

In 2013, the Tolyatti Museum of Local History, which the city has entrusted with the promotion of cultural heritage, published lists of the cultural and historical objects of regional importance located within the city of Tolyatti, as well of monumental sites and plaques maintained by the City of Tolyatti. The Museum classifies cultural heritage sites into three types: monuments, groups of entities (such as groups of buildings), and places of interest.

(There are also two lists of objects of cultural heritage in the territory of Tolyatti created by the Samara provincial government. These are actually a list of objects which as of 2015 contains only two entries, and a list of identified cultural heritage objects, that is objects which have received approval as such in expert opinion but which do not yet have protected status, which status may be granted later or refused.)

This list uses the classes provided by the Tolyatti Museum of Local History.

Key for monument classes
[R]	Monument of regional significance
[L]	Monument of the City of Tolyatti
[na]	Not listed, or protection class not available or known

Monument	Image	Location	Date	Creator(s)	Class (refs)
Aleksandr Lubischev Memorial		Institute of Ecology of the Volga River Basin, south of Tolyatti near the Volga River			[na]
Annunciation Monastery		Volga River bank downstream of Tolyatti	1846	(1980s restoration by Andrei Vasnetsov and E. Ioheles)	[R]
Gája Dimitrievich Gaj Monument					[L]
Georgy Zhukov Monument		Zhukov Street, Auto Factory District			[na]
Group of Buildings at the City Gateway		Komsomol District, near the Volga	early 1950s–early 1960s		[R]
History of Transport		Auto Factory District	1977–1979	Andrei Vasnetsov (also E. Ioheles)	[L]
Ivan Krasyuk Monument		KuibyshevAzot plant, Central District			
Juliana Gromova Memorial		Komsomol District			[na]
Karl Marx Monument		Liberty Square	1989, restored 2007	Igor Burmistenko (also Victor Formin, V. Z. Gurevich, A. V. Medvedkov)	[L]
Lenin Monument (The Leader's Call)		Central Park	1924 (original)	After an original by Georgy Alexeyev	[L]
Lesnoye Sanatorium		Forest between Central District and Auto Factory District	1910		[R]
Loyalty		Auto Factory District	2003	Oleg Klyuyev	[na]
Memorial to the Builders of the Volga Hydroelectric Power Station		Central Park			[na]
Memorial to the Founders of the City		Central Square	2000s		[na]
Monument to the Soldiers of the Afghan War		Victory Park	1994	N. I. Kolesnikov	[L]
Monument to the Young Pioneer Heroes of the Great Patriotic War		Volga River bank downstream of Tolyatti			[na]
Mourning Angel		Central Park	2006	Igor Burmistenko (also I. N. Prokopenko, Victor Fomin)	[L]
Obelisk of Glory		Liberty Square	1958	Mikhail Sorokin (also A. N. Pronyushkin, N. Kolesnikov)	[L]
Prometheus		Palace of Culture, Central Square		Yuri Bosco (also Fetisov)	[na]
Puppet Theater		Liberty Square	1958		[R]
Repin House		Central District	mid 19th century		[R]
Saint Nicholas		Central Square			[na]
Stavropol District Administrative Building		Liberty Square	1957–1958	Urban Institute (Russia)	[R]
Tolyatti Pine Forest		Between Central District and Auto Factory District	(n/a) –- badly burnt in 2010	Natural 851.6 ha (2,104.3-acre) forest	[R]
Stormy Petrel Cinema		Central District	1954	After an original by Zoya Brod	[R]
Tatishchev Monument		Kuybyshev Reservoir shore south of Tolyatti	1998	Alexander Rukavishnikov (also A. Kochekovsky, Mikhail Petukhov)	[L]
Tolyatti City Hall		Liberty Square			[R]
Vasily Zhilin Street Marker		Zhilina Street, Central District			[na]
Victor Nosov Memorial		School #4, Central District	1967	A. I. Frolov	[L]
Victory Monument		Victory Park	1985	Simon Winograd (also Alexander Shemyakin, Sandor Zicherman)	[na]
Yevgeny Nikonov Memorial			1979		[L]
