= 1770 in Russia =

- Decades: 1750s; 1760s; 1770s; 1780s; 1790s
- See also: History of Russia; Timeline of Russian history; List of years in Russia

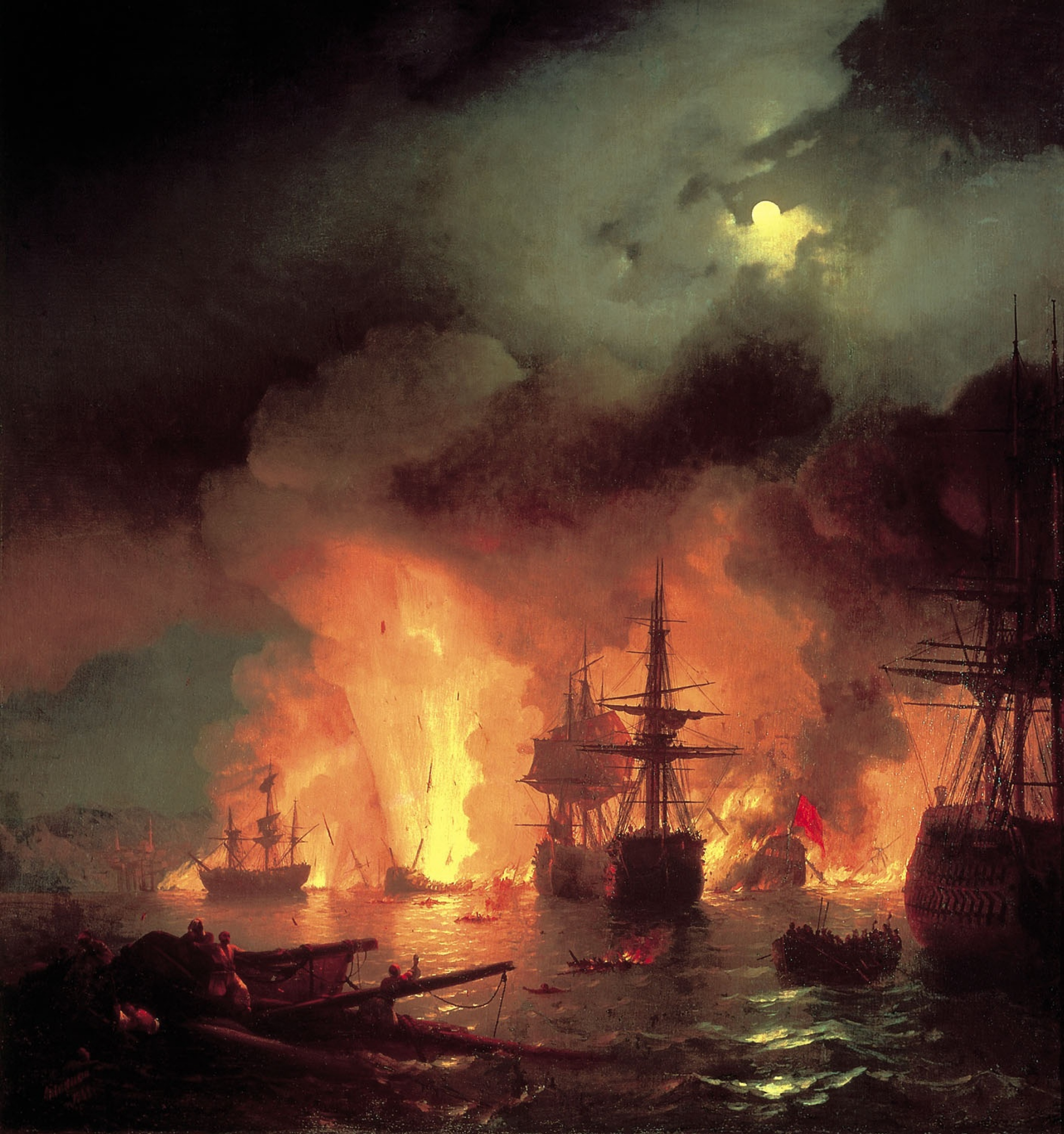
July 5: Battle of Chesma, painting by Ivan Aivazovsky

Events in the year 1770 in Russia.

== Incumbents ==
Monarch – Catherine II

== Events ==
- Russo-Turkish war
- January – Russian troops in Focșani witness the first signs of a plague
- 5–7 July – Battle of Chesma; The Russian fleet defeats the Ottoman fleet in Çeşme Bay near Çeşme
- 7 July – Battle of Larga; Russians defeat the Crimeans and Ottomans on the banks of the Larga River
- 1 August – Battle of Kagul; In the Kagul River near Cahul, in southern Moldavia, now Moldova, Russians score a land victory against Crimea and the Ottoman Empire.
- Russian plague - large-scale outbreak of plague in central Russia

== Births ==
Ivan Fedorovich Kruzenshtern - November 19, 1770, an admiral and explorer in the Imperial Russian Navy. He commanded the first Russian circumnavigation of the globe (1803–1806) aboard the ship Nadezhda.

Alexander Balashov - July 13, 1770 , a general and statesman who served as the Minister of Police (1810–1819) and military governor of Saint Petersburg.

Nerses V - served as the Catholicos of All Armenians
