= 1768 in Russia =

Events from the year 1768 in Russia

== Incumbents ==
- Monarch – Catherine II

== Events ==
- Russo-Turkish War (1768–74)
- Catherine II was inoculated against smallpox, setting an example for her subjects and marking an important moment in Russian medical history.
- Catherine II founded assignation banks, paving the way for Russia’s first paper money.

== Births ==
- Vera Zavadovskaya, courtier (d. 1845)
- Avdotya Vorobyeva

== Deaths ==
- 1768 – Ivan Barkov, Russian poet and translator (b. 1732)
