= Varvara Bakhmeteva =

Russian noblewoman (1815–1851)

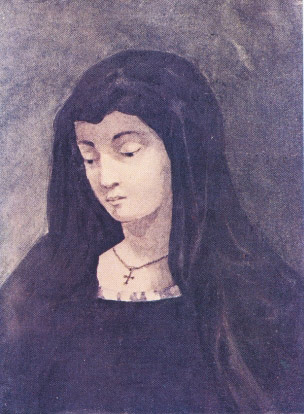
Amelia, the heroine of Mikhail Lermontov's play "The Spaniards". Painting by Lermontov. Understood to be a portrait of Varvara Lopukhina.

Varvara Aleksandrovna Bakhmeteva (Варва́ра Алекса́ндровна Бахме́тева; 1815 – 9 September 1851), birth name Varvara Alexandrovna Lopukhina, was a Russian noblewoman who was the beloved and tragic muse of the great Romantic poet Mikhail Lermontov.

== Biography ==
Born into the ancient noble Lopukhin family, Varvara Lopukhina was the seventh of eight children. She and her brother Alexei and sister Maria were close friends of Mikhail Lermontov from 1828, when Lermontov came to Moscow for his secondary school education – and in time Varvara and Mikhail fell in love. At the age of 18, Lermontov wrote these lines to Lopukhin:

But all her movements,
Smile, speech, and features,
So full of life and inspiration,
So full of wonderful simplicity;
Yet the voice of the soul comes through,
How I shall remember these incomparable days...

According to recollections of the relatives of the poet, Lermontov retained this love for Lopukhina until his death. But the Lopukhin family opposed their marriage, particularly Varvara's father, Aleksandr Lopukhin, and her sister and Lermontov's friend, Mariya.

In 1835 Varvara Lopukhina married Nikolay Fyodorovich Bakhmetev, a wealthy landowner and an Active State Councillor. Nikolay was then 37 and Varvara 20. According to Lermontov's second cousin Akim Shan-Girey, at the news of Lopukhina's impending marriage Lermontov's "face changed and grew pale".

Lermontov found difficulty in accepting Varvara's new surname. Sending her a new version of "Demon" (a long poem featuring some of the most resonant lines in the Russian language, which he rewrote several times), he several times crossed out the initials ВАБ and wrote instead ВАЛ in the dedication sent to the copyist. One may note that "Л" also happens to be the poet's own initial, implying that Lermontov had had intentions of marrying her.

Lermontov, tormented by jealousy, alluded to Nikolay Bakhmetev several times in his writing with sardonic humor as a greybeard and cuckold. However, his stinging attacks on Bakhmetev were also transferred to his wife:

As the dessert champagne was served, Pechorin, raising his glass, turned to the princess: "As I did not have the good fortune to be at your wedding, let me congratulate you now". She looked at him with surprise and said nothing. But a secret anguish cast a fleeting shadow across her face, and the water glass in her hand was trembling... Pechorin saw it all, and something akin to remorse crept into his chest: was he the source of her torment? And for what? And what pleasure did he find in petty revenge?... He thought this to himself, but could find no answer.

Bakhmetev was also jealous and forbade his wife to speak of Lermontov, and made every effort to destroy her correspondence with the poet, so that the main source of information about their relationship after marriage is the poet's correspondence with Varvara's sister, Mariya Lopukhina.

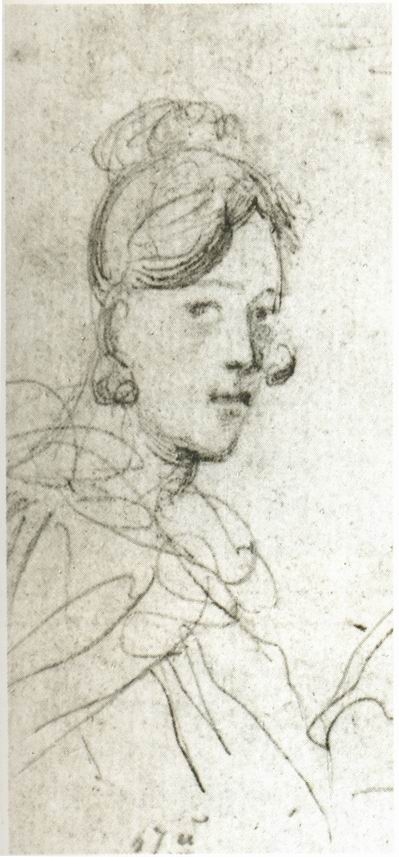
Sketch of Varvara Lopukhina, by Lermontov

In 1839, to save all her materials associated with Lermontov from destruction, Varvara Bakhmeteva gave them to her friend Aleksandra Vereshchagina when she was at a European resort. Much of this material, drawings and writing by Lermontov, were passed to Vereshchagina's descendants in Russia. According to the literary critic Irakly Andronikov, though, "Not all the Vereshchagina materials have come to light".

Varvara Bakhmeteva was never happy or even well after her marriage. Her last meeting with Lermontov in 1838 was described thus by Shan-Girey:

My God, how painfully my heart ached at her appearance! Pale, thin, and no trace of the old Varvara. Only her eyes retained their luster, and they were as affectionate as ever.

Varvara and Nikolay Bakhmetev had a daughter, Olga (married name Olga Bazylevska). In 1838 Lermontov, returned from his exile in the Caucasus, met with mother and child. According to Pavel Viskovatov, Lermontov's poem "The Child" is about this meeting. Reacting to the changed appearance of his beloved, Lermontov wrote

...Alas! The years fly;
Suffering before her time, she is changed.
But the true dream, the true image,
Is kept in my heart.

Varvara Bakhmeteva had repeatedly traveled with her husband abroad for treatment, but after Lermontov's death in an 1841 duel, her condition deteriorated. In the autumn of 1841 her sister Mariya wrote:

The latest news about my sister Varvara is truly sad. She is again ill, her nerves are so upset that she was forced to spend two weeks in bed. Too weak even to eat. Her husband asked her to go to Moscow - she refuses to go abroad - but she refused and stated emphatically that she no longer wishes to be treated. Maybe I'm wrong, but I attribute this disorder to the death of Mikhail.

Varvara Bakhmeteva died on 9 September 1851, at the age of 36. She was buried in the small cathedral of the Donskoy Monastery. Her husband survived her by more than thirty years. Nikolay Fyodorovich Bakhmetev died on 3 March 1884, and was buried beside his wife.

== Varvara Lopukhina in the works of Lermontov ==
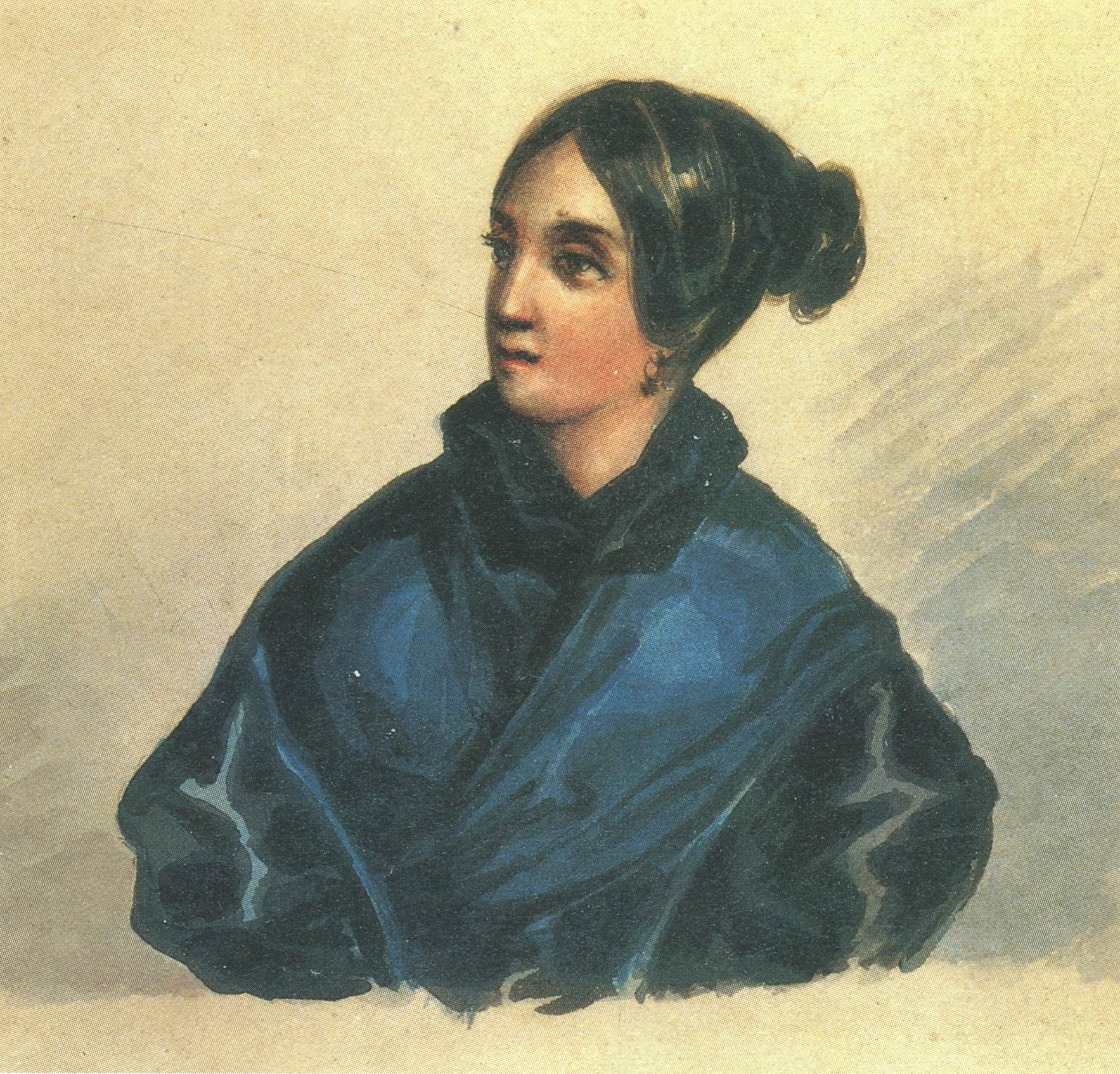
Varvara Bakhmeteva. Painting by Lermontov in 1835, the year of her marriage.

The figure of Varvara Aleksandrovna is reflected many times in Lermontov's work. He dedicated some works to her directly, and she served as the prototype of many of the poet's characters, such as in verses 254–260 of the poem "Sashka". And he painted and drew many portraits of her also.

The third edition of his famous poem "Demon" was dedicated to Varvara Lopukhina; the sixth and seventh he also sent to her with a dedication.

Lermontov's play "Two Brothers", written after Varvara's marriage, highlights the mercantile aspects of contemporary marriage, a financial relationship with no deep feelings between the spouses.

A similar theme – a strong sense of connection between two characters before the heroine's marriage to another, but the heroine's love not quenched but rather strengthened by the separation – appears in the poet's later works "Princess Ligovskaya" and "A Hero of Our Time". Of this autobiographical work Lermontov wrote "...I'm writing the fourth act of the new drama, taken from events that happened to me in Moscow."

The name Varvara Lopukhina is closely linked to Lermontov's poem addressed to Yekaterina Bykhovets: "No, it is not you whom I love so ardently". According to Bykhovets's memoirs:

He was passionately in love with B. A. Bakhmetev... I think I drew his attention because he found in me her likeness, and his favorite topic of conversation was her.

Autobiographical passages occurred in "A Hero of Our Time". According to Lermontov's first biographer, Pavel Viskovatov, everyone who read the chapter "Princess Mary" recognized the Bakhmetevs in the characters of Faith and her husband.

Lermontov's description of his female characters speak for themselves:r

- Princess Ligovskaya: "Princess Vera Dmitryevna was a woman of 22 years, the average female height, blonde with black eyes, which gave her face an original charm"
- Princess Faith: "...she is medium height, blonde hair, she has deep eyes" ("deep" meaning "dark" in this context)
- From a poem by a child: "And the quick eyes and golden curls,/ and the sonorous voice!/ Is it not true, as they say,/ that you like her?"

Here is how Varvara Bakhmeteva is described by her great-niece O. N. Trubetskaya:

Her large portrait, which I have with me in Moscow, shows gentle dark eyes, and her whole appearance fanned with quiet sadness.

This characteristic feature, the dark eyes and blonde hair, is present almost everywhere, except perhaps in the poem where the term "dark eyes" is replaced with "wing-footed". However, according to research by N. Pakhomov this is similar to a change the poet resorted to in "Hero of Our Time", when a mole on Princess Faith's eyebrow - a feature identical to one that Varvara Bakhmetev had - is, in the final version, moved to the cheek "to avoid speculation about the overly close resemblance"

Lermontov also painted several portraits of Varvara. There are some portraits which are known to be of her, and a number of others of which she is believed or assumed to be the subject.

== The Annunciation Monastery ==
Varvara Bakhmeteva is also memorialized in the city of Tolyatti (known until 1964 as Stavropol).

In 1846, Nikolai Fedorovich Bakhmetev constructed a stone church, the altar of which was dedicated to Saint Barbara, in the hope of curative divine intercession for Varvara. It didn't work.

This church is now the oldest building in Tolyatti and is the main church of the Annunciation Monastery, a recognized historical monument of Tolyatti.

== Sources ==
- Лобанова Н. Г. (2007). А счастье было так возможно.... Деловая дама Тольятти (in Russian) (3). Tolyatti: 34–35. (in Russian)
- Беличенко Ю. (2001). Лермонтов. Роман документального поиска. (in Russian) (Подъем, No. 8, 10, 11, 12). Archived from the original on 20 March 2012. (in Russian)
- Вольперт Л. И. (2005). Лермонтов и литература Франции (в Царстве Гипотезы). Tolyatti: Фонд эстонского языка. ISBN 9985-79-132-0. (in Russian)
