= 1845 in Russia =

- Decades: 1820s; 1830s; 1840s; 1850s; 1860s
- See also: History of Russia; Timeline of Russian history; List of years in Russia

Events from the year 1845 in Russia

== Incumbents ==
- Monarch – Nicholas I

== Events ==
In 1845, Nicholas I ordered a major military campaign into the mountains of Dagestan to strike at Imam Shamil's stronghold. Under the command of Prince Mikhail Vorontsov, the newly appointed Viceroy of the Caucasus, a Russian force advanced deep into the mountains and stormed the fortified settlement of Dargo, which served as Shamil's headquarters. The expedition ended in severe losses and failed to end the insurgency, with Russian troops suffering incessant attacks while withdrawing from the mountains.

- 18 August - The Russian Geographical Society founded by order of Nilolas I

== Births and deaths ==
- Vera Zavadovskaya, courtier (b. 1768)
- Alexander III, monarch (d. 1894)
- Ilya Ilyich Mechnikov, zoologist and immunologist who later received the Nobel Prize in Physiology or Medicine (1908) for his work on immunity; born 15 May in a village near Kharkov, in the Russian Empire (d. 1916)
- Pyotr Bezobrazov, admiral in the Imperial Russian Navy (d. 1906)
