= Yuri Bosco =

Russian artist (1930–2019)

- Born: Yuri Ivanovich Bosco; 24 September 1930; Samarkand, Uzbek SSR, Soviet Union
- Died: 4 February 2019 (aged 88)
- Education: Leningrad Art and Industry Academy

Yuri Ivanovich Bosco (Russian: Ю́рий Ива́нович Боско) (24 September 1930 – 4 February 2019) was a Russian artist, an Honored Artist of the RSFSR (1963) and People's Artist of the Russian Federation (2006).

== Early life ==
Bosco was born on 24 September 1930 in Samarkand. His mother, Catherine (né Klimushkin) was born in Samara, his father (whose name was originally Bosc before he lengthened it to Bosco) was born in St. Petersburg. Yuri Bosco's father died when Yuri was a child, and his mother moved them to Samara (called Kuybyshev at that time). With the German invasion of Russia in 1941, Bosco's mother sent him to live with her sister in Samarkand. There his early drawings showed talent and his aunt enrolled him in art school.

== Education ==
Later he studied in Tashkent and Moscow. In 1956 he was graduated from the Leningrad Art and Industry Academy (named, at that time, in honor of Worker and Kolkhoz Woman sculptor Vera Mukhina, and thus often called the Mukhina Academy during this time) with degrees in Monuments and Decorative Painting.

Bosco was admitted to the Union of Russian Artists and was elected chairman of the Volgograd organization, and was elected to the boards of the Union of Russian Artists and the Union of Soviet Artists. Despite this recognition he elected not to move to the capital but to remain on the Volga, living and working in Volgograd, Samara, and Tolyatti, where he executed his most famous works, although he did finally move to Moscow to work and teach in 1978.

== Works ==
Bosco painted many realistic works, some that were widely reproduced in the USSR, including "Workday Life at the Volga Hydroelectric Station", "Above the Volga", "The Volzanka", and "The Common People".

Bosco's monumental works include:

- Prometheus, a large bas-relief sculpture on the side of the Palace of Culture in Tolyatti. Dating to 1975, it measures 11 metres (36 ft) by 14.5 metres (48 ft). Bosco executed this design with assistance of the sculptor Fetisov.
- A mosaic in Lenin Memorial Center in Ulyanovsk.
- The composition Energy for the People in the Volga Hydroelectric Station.
- The painting Labor Hall of Fame in the Volga Automobile Plant in Tolyatti.
- And other paintings, mosaics, and stained glass works in Volgograd, Uralsk, Samara, Tolyatti, and other cities.

After the collapse of the Soviet Union, Bosco turned more to portrait painting. Among his works are portraits of the architects Levitan and Pryadihina, the artists Egidisa and Nazarova, a series of portraits of scientists, geologists, and faculty of Moscow State University, and the painting "O Days of Harsh Sacred Memory", a portrait of frontline medical orderly Mary Rokhlina executed for the 60th anniversary of victory in the Great Patriotic War.

Before you start to work on the portrait, it is necessary not only to meet the subject, but to know him, to love, to understand...

— Yuri Bosco

Yuri Bosco participated in various art exhibitions. Bosco's paintings hang in museums and art galleries in Moscow (including the Tretyakov Gallery), St. Petersburg, Samara, Tolyatti, Volgograd, Nizhny Novgorod, Perm, and abroad. His work has been presented to the public in Germany, Poland, the United States, Britain, France, Japan, China, and Bulgaria as well as many Russian cities. In 2006, the Central House of Artists in Moscow hosted a joint exhibition of works by Bosco and his daughter, Anna Bosco.

In 1978, Bosco was appointed a professor of drawing at Moscow Architectural Institute.

In 2005, Natalia Dolinskaya published a coffee table book retrospective of Bosco's works.
