= 1846 in Russia =

- Decades: 1820s; 1830s; 1840s; 1850s; 1860s
- See also: History of Russia; Timeline of Russian history; List of years in Russia

Here are the events from the year 1846 in Russia.

== Incumbents ==
- Monarch – Nicholas I

== Events ==
- A wealthy landowner, Nikolai Bakhmetev, constructs a stone church, which would eventually be built into the Annunciation Monastery (Tolyatti) in Samara Oblast
- On January 15, Russian writer Fyodor Dostoevsky's first novel "Poor Folk" was published in the St. Petersburg Collection almanac, which was a significant moment in Russian literature that foreshadowed deeper social critiques.
- The Double was first published in the Otechestvennye zapiski on 30 January, which was Fyodor Dostoevsky's second novel.
- The Petrashevsky Circle, organized by Mikhail Petrashevsky, was active in the 1840s (founded in 1845) and by 1846 it existed as a gathering of intellectuals.
- A devastating potato disease hit the Russian Empire. However, it was supposed to shield the peasants against famine.

== Births ==
=== January–June ===
- 23 January – Nikolay Umov, Physicist and mathematician (d. 15 January 1915)
- 9 May – Nicolai Soloviev, composer (d. 27 December 1916)
- 30 May – Peter Carl Farbergé, Jeweler (d. 24 September 1920)

=== July–December ===
- 3 July – Achilles Alferaki, composer (d. 27 December 1919)
- August 16 – Oskar Victorovich Stark, Russian admiral and explorer (d. 1928)
- September 25 – Wladimir Köppen, Russian-German geographer, climatologist (d. 1940)
- 23 October – Alexander Arkhangelsky, composer (d. 16 November 1924)
- December 21 – Julia Lermontova, Russian chemist (d. 1919)

== Deaths ==
- 9 December - Nikolay Bogolepov
