= 1843 in Russia =

- Decades: 1820s; 1830s; 1840s; 1850s; 1860s
- See also: History of Russia; Timeline of Russian history; List of years in Russia

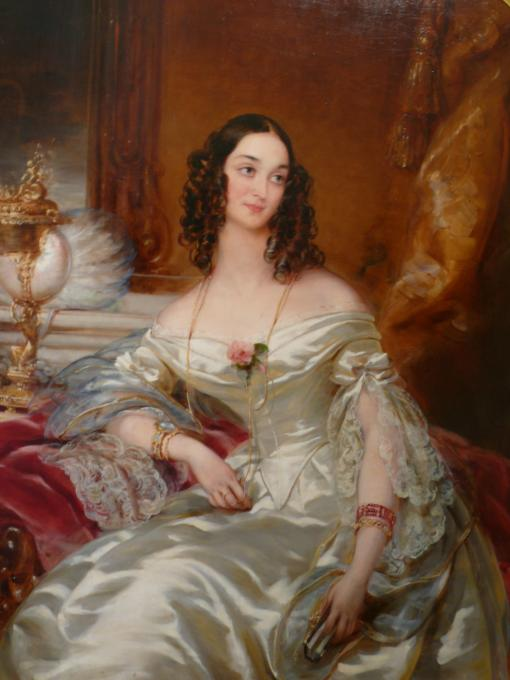
Anna Sheremeteva by Robertson

Events from the year 1843 in Russia

== Incumbents ==
- Monarch – Nicholas I

== Events ==
- St. Nicholas Cossack Cathedral
- St. Seraphim Chapel
- Stāmeriena Palace
- Kovno Governorate

== Births ==
- Nicholas Alexandrovich, Tsesarevich of Russia
- Mark Antokolsky
- Mikhail Pevtsov

== Deaths ==
- Praskovya Alexandrovna Hendrikova
