= Victory Monument (Tolyatti) =

Coordinates: 53.5105°N 49.2752°E

Memorial in Honor of the 40th Anniversary of Victory in the Great Patriotic War (Russian: Мемориал в честь 40-летия Победы в Великой Отечественной войне) or simply Victory Monument is a 1985 monument in the Avtozavodsky (Auto Factory) District of Tolyatti dedicated to the Soviet victory in World War II (called the Great Patriotic War in Russia).

== History ==
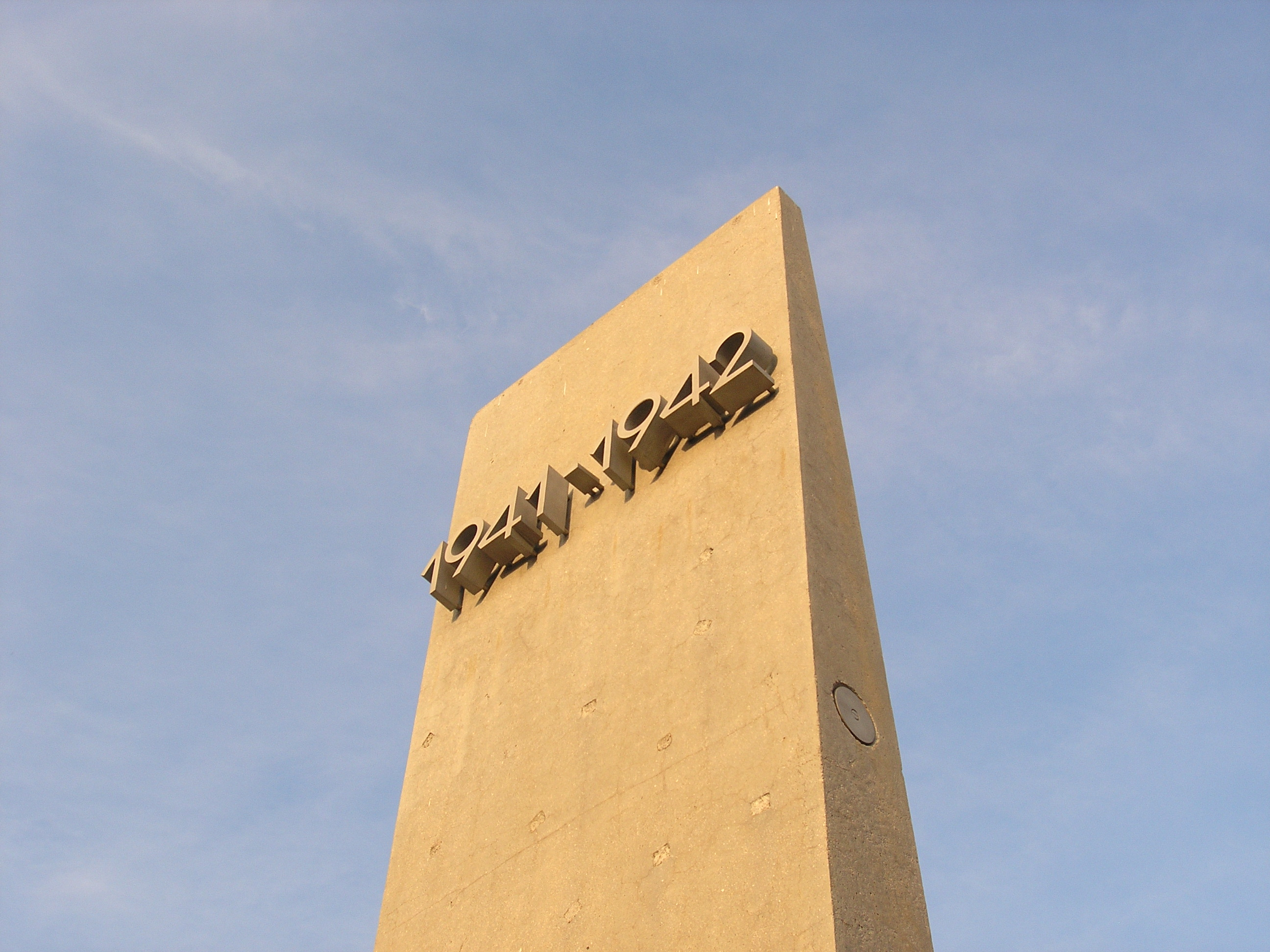
The 1941-1942 stela

The memorial complex was built in Victory Park as part of the 1985 remembrance of the 40th anniversary of the 1945 victory over Nazi Germany. The memorial was officially opened on June 7, 1985. The designer was Simon Winograd, and VAZ undertook the construction.

Later additions were made to the memorial in 1987–1988: bas-reliefs were installed, and in the center a star with an eternal flame was installed.

On March 9, 1995, a capsule of earth brought from Poklonnaya Hill in Moscow (the site of Moscow's Victory Park) was placed in one of the monument's wreaths (the one on the side facing Jubilee Street).

In April 2007, hooligans stole part of the framing of the eternal flame, but the vandals were soon arrested and the items recovered.

== Architecture ==
The monument consists of four 10-metre (33 ft) stelae formed in a ring. The four stelae represent the four years of the war (1941–1942, 1942–1943, 1943–1944, and 1944–1945) and each has one of the designated years displayed at its top.

On the outer face of the foot of each stela are ledges with stylized wreaths cast from aluminum. On the inner faces of each stela is a bas–relief: ("Partisans", "Victims of Fascism", "Home Front" and "Battle Front") all sculpted by Sandor Zicherman.

The ring connecting the stelae is faced with stainless steel. On its inner side is an inscription of aluminum letters: "Eternal Honor to the People's Heroism".

In the center of the monument is a star with the eternal flame, framed by five bronze sections.

== Sources ==
- R. Markov Forever in the People's Memory: in Victory Park will be Built a Memorial in Honor of the 40th Anniversary of Victory. Волжский автостроитель (Volga Car Builder), April 25, 1985 (N 47, S. 1) (in Russian)
- T. Krymchuzhina Victory Park: Reporting from the Opening of the Memorial in Victory Park in the Avtozavodsky District of Togliatti. За коммунизм (For Communism), May 11, 1988 (N 90, S. 1) (in Russian)
