= Annunciation Monastery (Tolyatti) =

Coordinates: 53°27′50.18″N 49°37′51.37″E

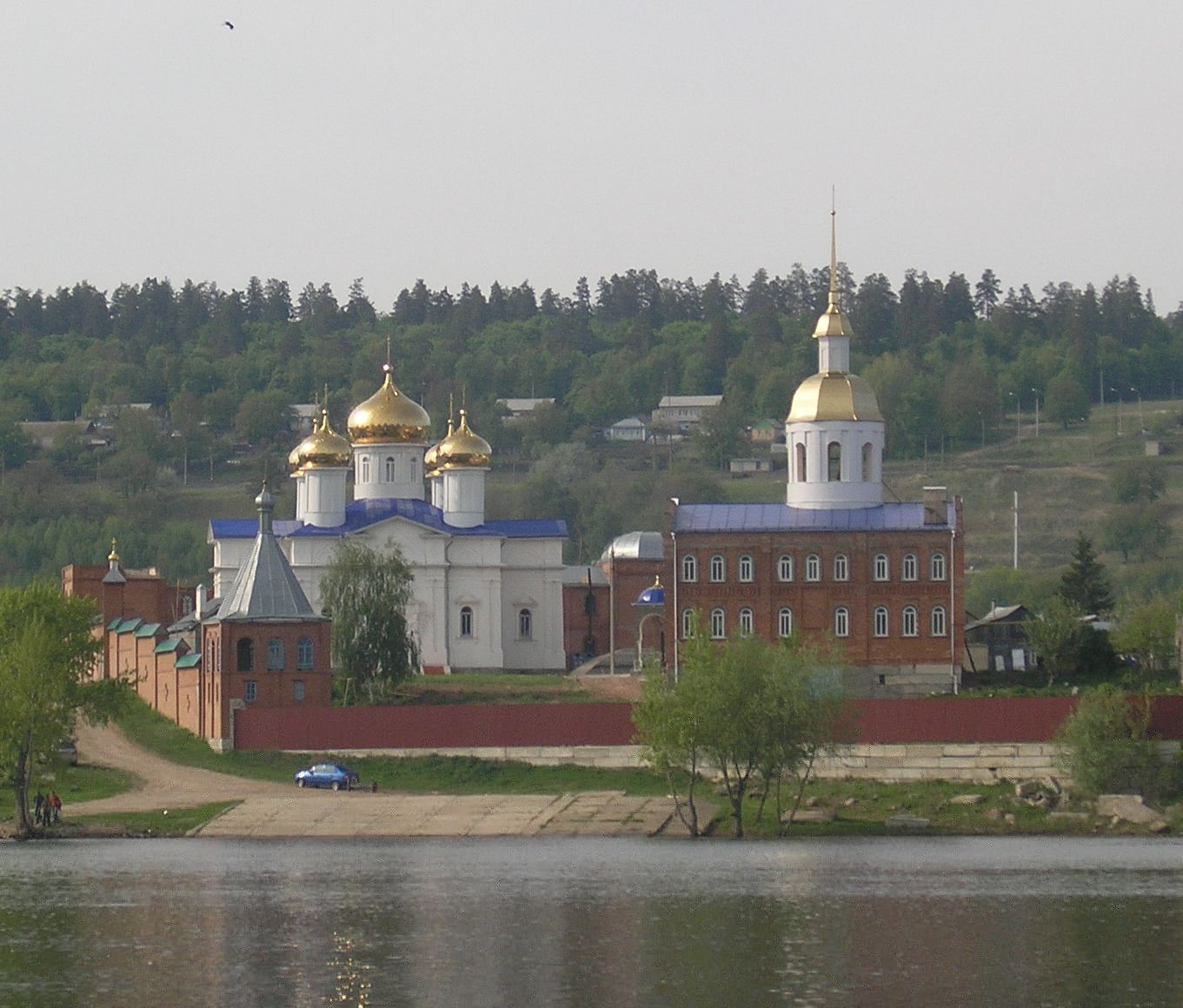
Annunciation Monastery

The Annunciation Monastery (Russian: Благовещенский скит) is a church complex in the village of Fyodorovka in the urban district of Tolyatti in Samara Oblast in Russia.

== History ==
=== Founding ===
Barbara Bakhmetev (née Lopukhin) was the lifelong love of the poet Mikhail Lermontov and the inspiration for some of his works, but the pair was not allowed to marry. Instead, Barbara was married to the wealthy landowner and master of Fyodorovka, Nikolai Fedorovich Bakhmetev. Barbara was never happy or well after her marriage, and fell more deeply ill after the death of Lermontov in 1841.

In 1846 Nikolai Bakhmetev constructed a stone church, the altar which was dedicated in honor of St. Barbara, in hope of a cure for his wife. This was the first building of what would become the Annunciation Monastery. The first priest of the church was Alexander Kornilievich Yastrebov. Barbara Bakhmetev died in 1851 at the age of 36.

In 1871, Peter Flerinsky was baptized in the church. Flerinsky later became Bishop Paul, a leader of the Orthodox Church in early Soviet times (and sometime prisoner of the Soviets).

=== Deconsecration and renewal ===
On March 6, 1930, the church bells were removed. The church, like many others in the diocese, was closed, and the property seized by the state. The building was used as a recreation center, and later as a shop.

In the late 1980s the building was returned to the Russian Orthodox Church. Restoration was undertaken, and the church was replastered and painted. The floor was paved with marble, and a new iconostasis was installed. The restoration was undertaken by a group of artists led by the People's Artist of the USSR and USSR State Prize laureate Andrei Vasnetsov and the Central Research and Design Institute of Residential and Public Buildings architect E. Ioheles.

On May 19, 1989, the church was reopened. Nicholas Manihin, provost of the Stavropol region of Samara diocese, consecrated the church in honor of the Annunciation. The first rector of the restored church was Archpriest Vladimir Novichkov (Father Gregory). One of the icons saved by a believer when the church was seized in 1930 was returned for the rebirth of the church.

In 1990, construction began close to the Annunciation Church of the monastery complex, which included a refectory, another church in honor of St. Barbara, ten monastic cells, and outbuildings.

== Architectural features ==
The church has a triangular pediment. From under the cornices protrude kokoshniks (an architectural feature, peculiar to Russia, of semicircular decorative elements at the end of the outer section of a wall, which takes its name from that of a traditional Russian woman's headdress, Kokoshnik). The church is crowned with five golden domes (originally blue, these were later gold-plated).

The Annunciation Church building is officially recognized as an architectural monument of Tolyatti. Because the city was completely relocated when the Kuybyshev dam was built in the 1950s, it is now the oldest building surviving in Tolyatti.

The monastery is located directly on the shores of the Volga, and clearly visible from ships sailing the river.
