= 1840 in Russia =

- Decades: 1820s; 1830s; 1840s; 1850s; 1860s
- See also: History of Russia; Timeline of Russian history; List of years in Russia

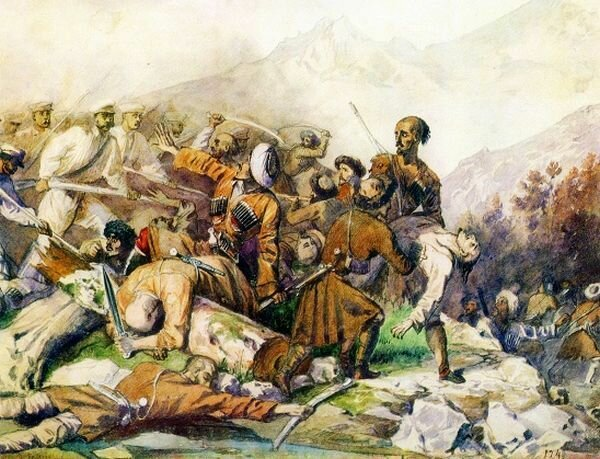
Valerik

Events from the year 1840 in Russia

== Incumbents ==
- Monarch – Nicholas I

== Events ==
- Battle of the Valerik River
- Convention of London (1840)

== Births ==
- April 9 – Praskovya Uvarova, archaeologist (d. 1924)
- May 7 – Pyotr Ilyich Tchaikovsky, composer (d. 1893)
- November 4 - Dmitry Karakozov, assassin (d. 1866)
