= Repin House =

Coordinates: 53°30′49.892″N 49°23′53.398″E

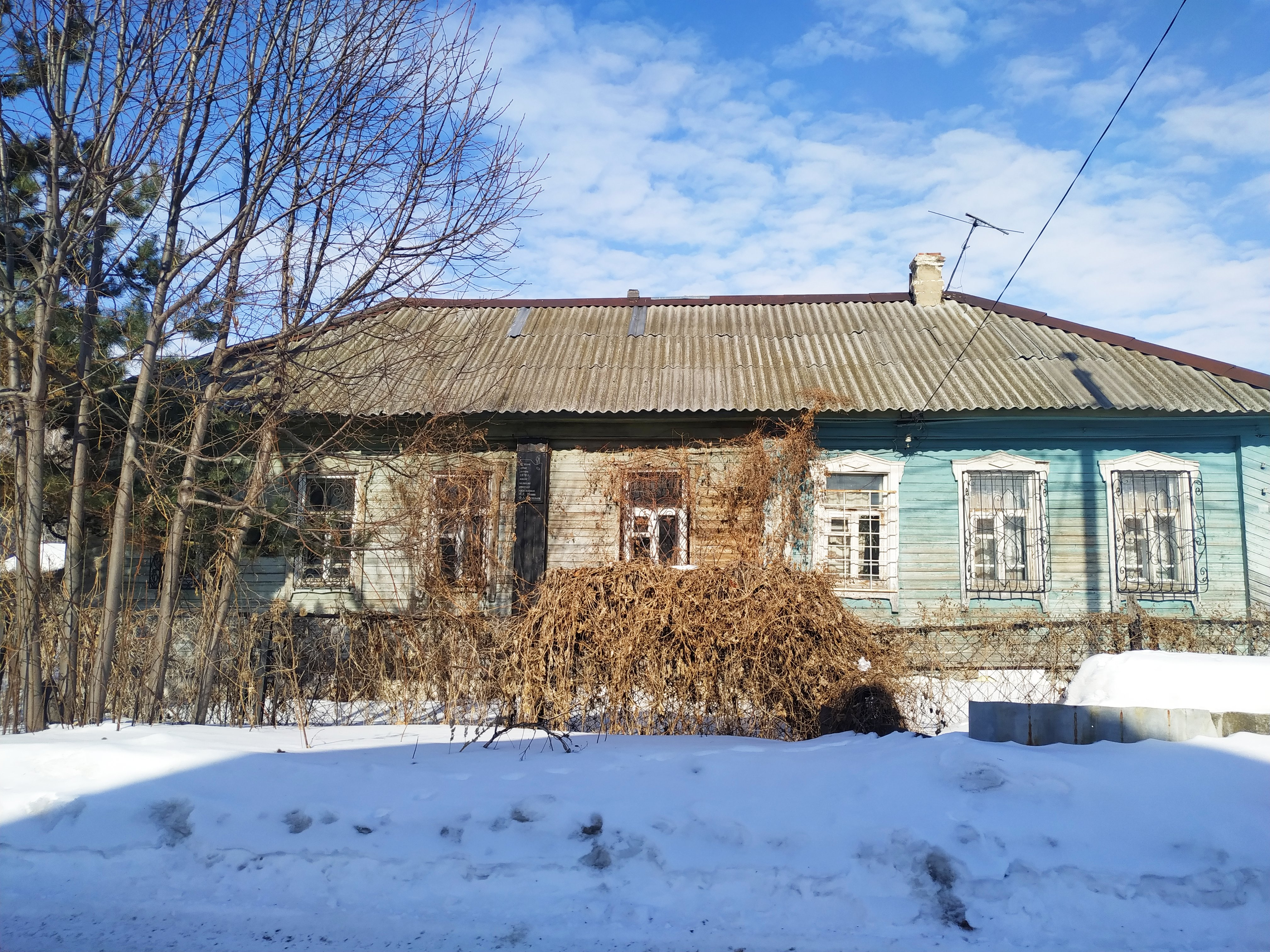
Repin House

The Repin House is a historical monument in the Russian city of Tolyatti. It commemorates of a brief stay there by the great Russian painter Ilya Repin in 1870.

== Repin's stay ==
In the summer of 1870 the young artist Ilya Repin, then 25 and early in what would become a renowned career, came to the Volga to gather inspiration for paintings of the lives of the river boatmen and burlaks. This sojourn resulted in his painting of the iconic Barge Haulers on the Volga and other work. With Repin came twenty-year-old landscapist Fyodor Vasilyev, Repin's academy classmate Yevgeny Makarov, and Repin's younger brother Basil.

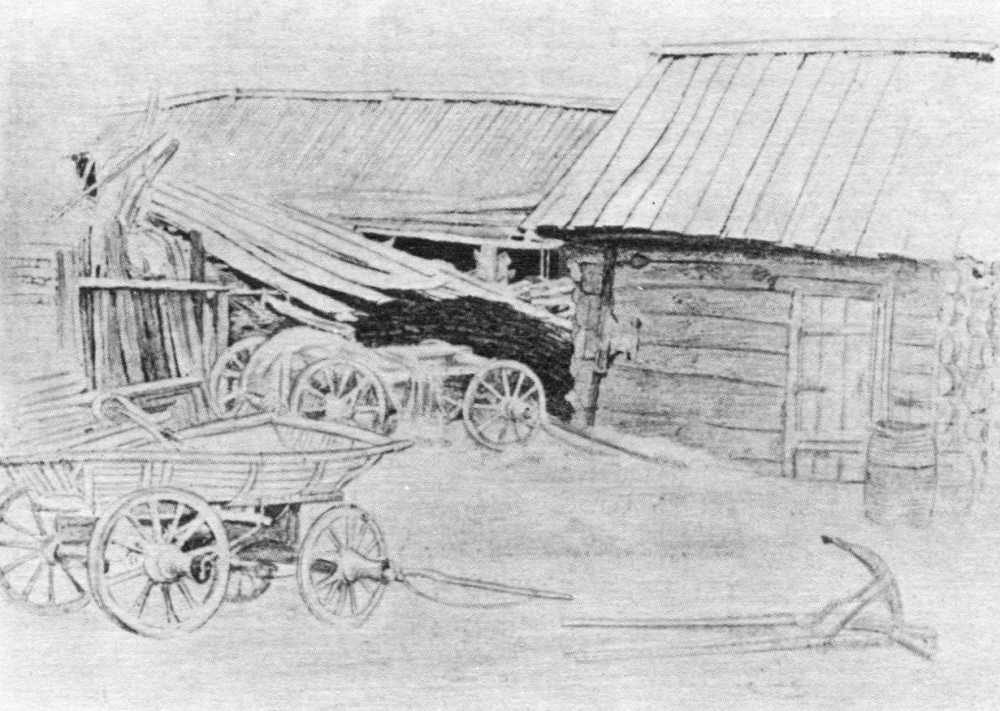
"Battle-Axe's Yard", 1870 sketch by Repin

The petite bourgeoisie woman Anna Akhmatova Buyanova (nicknamed "Battle-Axe") operated a coaching inn at a house on Posad Street (latter Cooperative 117) in Stavropol-on-Volga (the name of Tolyatti at that time). Repin and his companions lived there for two weeks.

Here it is. The courtyard, with a porch, was divided by gate, the gate is wide open and it shan't be shut... On a nearby porch a mustachioed fellow is being treated by his subjects like a big shot..."

— Ilya Repin, A Distant Closeness (memoirs)

Repin and his companions then moved further down the Volga to stay in what is now the Repin Museum.

== Status as a memorial ==
In 1947, some Stavropolians made a corner of the house into a memorial to Repin, with a portrait of the artist and prints of his works. In 1955, as part of the transfer of the city to its new location (the existing city was to be submerged when the Kuybyshev Reservoir was filled), the government had originally intended to move the house to the city center, but later it was decided to place it more on the outskirts. The street in which it was placed is named Repin Street.

The building was first placed under protection as a historic monument by executive decision of the government of Kuybyshev Region (the then-current name for Samara Region), order number 735 of December 21, 1970. There is a memorial plaque on the house, and it is designated as a historical and cultural monument of regional significance, so that the original exterior appearance is protected from alteration, including both the structural elements and decorations on the facade. The 2000 city registry indicates that the interior as well as the facade is protected.

However, the appearance of the building has changed since Repin's day: originally a log house with a rustic plank roof, in the mid-20th-century it was trimmed with wood siding and iron window gratings and roofed with corrugated iron.

Unlike the Repin house in Shiryaevo, this house is not a museum and is not open to the public.

== Repin Museum ==
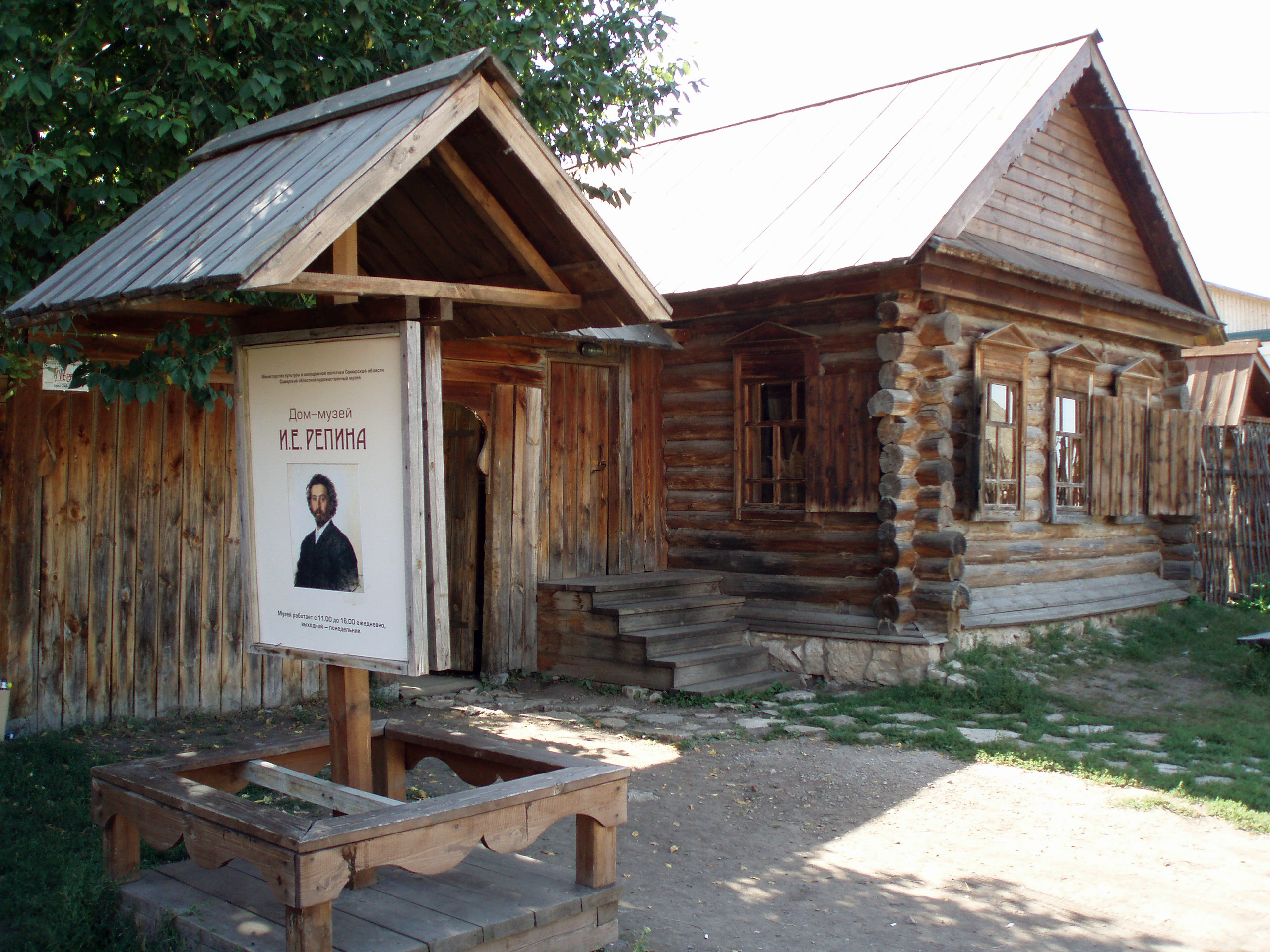
Repin Museum in Shiryaevo, a different structure

This house is not to be confused with the Repin Museum in the village of Shiryaevo (Russian: Ширяево) in the Zhiguliovsk district, located about 25 miles (40 km) (38 versts) downstream from Stavropol-on-Don. This is a log house in which Repin and his companions lived after leaving Stavropol-on-Don, and it here that he began the sketches for Barge Haulers on the Volga. This house is also a historic monument of regional importance. It opened as a public museum on June 2, 2007. It includes an ethnographic exhibit with examples of Russian woodcarving, carts, boats, and so forth.
