= Lesnoye Sanatorium =

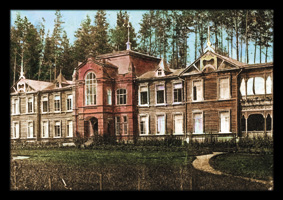
- Original building of the Lesnoye Sanatorium. Photograph taken between 1910 and 1914

Geography
- Location: Tolyatti, Russia
- Coordinates: 53°30′04″N 49°21′20″E

Organisation
- Type: Sanatorium, Rehabilitation hospital

History
- Opened: 1910

Links
- Website: sanlesnoe.ru
- Lists: Hospitals in Russia

Lesnoye Sanatorium (Russian: санаторий Лесное) is the oldest medical institution in the city of Tolyatti, Russia. Its main focus is tuberculosis treatment.

Despite being only 3 kilometers (1.9 mi) from the center of what is now the large city of Tolyatti, the sanatorium is located in 42 hectares (100 acres) of forest (the Tolyatti Pine Forest) near the shores of the Volga, hence its name, which means "Sanatorium in the Forest".

== History ==
=== Before 1917 ===
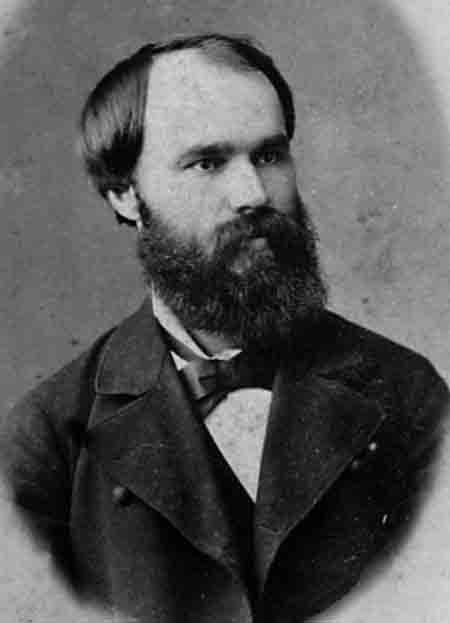
Vladimir Zolotnitsky, first chief physician

Lesnoye Sanatorium was founded in 1910 by the Stavropol-on-Volga merchant and entrepreneur V. N. Klimushin (Stavropol-on-Volga being the former name of Tolyatti). The original building was a two-storey building of brick and timber, with stove heating. The newspapers announcing the opening of the health resort noted that medicinal kumis (fermented horse milk) was to be a feature of the therapeutic regime. Vladimir B. Zolotnitsky, a tuberculosis specialist and well-known public figure, was appointed chief physician and the first tuberculosis patients were admitted.

The sanatorium applied advanced (for the time) methods of treatment, including the Mantoux test and electrification. There were laboratories and a sunroom.

Out on the steppe far from the Lesnoye Sanatorium was a farm where two hundred horses were kept to provide mare's milk. From this was made the sanatorium's therapeutic beverage – kumis. During the holiday season up to 45,000 bottles of kumis were produced, not only for use by the sanatorium but also for sale.

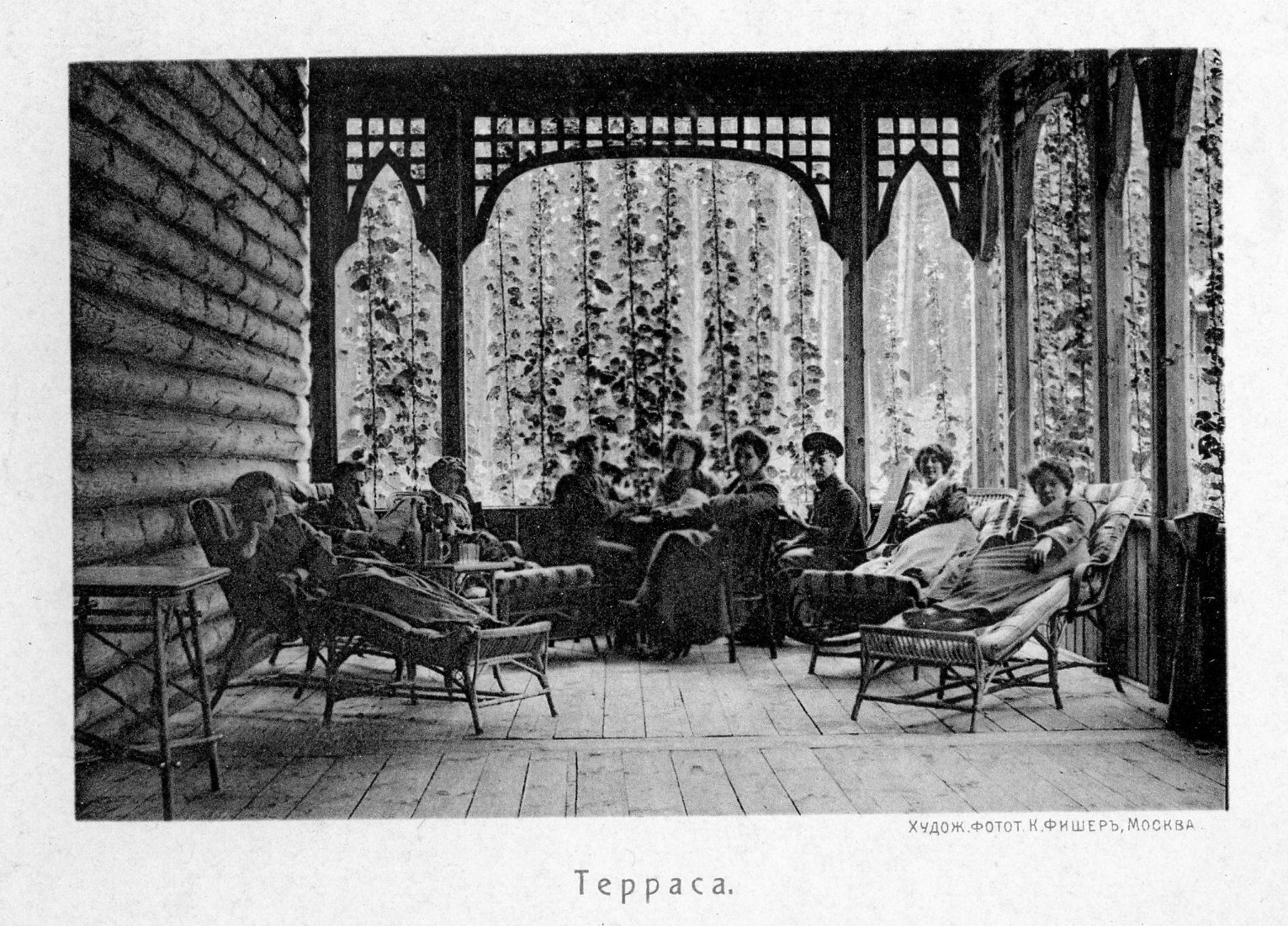
Patients on the porch

Patients came from all over Russia – mostly the wealthy, as the fee for a season was 200 silver rubles. The health resort became famous, attracting aristocrats from Turkey and France. The health resort was well-appointed, with flower gardens, sculptures, fountains, and gazebos. There were electric lights and water from an artesian well. Horse-drawn carriages were available for hire.

In 1913, the sanatorium treated the French communist Inessa Armand. In 1967 a memorial plaque with her name was placed, lost when the building was renovated.

During World War I, the Lesnoye Sanatorium was used as a rehabilitation hospital for wounded soldiers and officers.

=== In Soviet times ===
In 1918, the sanatorium was nationalized and given over to the Stavropol-on-Volga district health department. In the 1920s and 1930s outbreaks of tuberculosis were common throughout Russia, and the sanatorium became the base from which the Moscow tuberculosis clinics were supervised, and was itself filled to capacity. Surgical methods of treatment and more effective use of kumis were developed here.

During World War II the Military Institute of Foreign Languages moved to Stavropol-on-Volga, and a training center for military translators was established at the Lesnoye Sanatorium under the direction of Lieutenant General Nikolai Biasi. From 1941 to 1942 two thousand translators were trained. Among the cadets trained here were many who became well-known writers, artists and composers, including Vladimir Etush, Andrei Eshpai, S. Lvov, E. Rzhevskaya, and A. Troyanovsky.

After the war, Lesnoye Sanatorium began accepting patients again, but only in the summer. In 1950 about 100 patients were admitted. Year-round operations resumed in 1960, and patients came for treatment from all over the USSR.

In 1980, a large (3 metres (9.8 ft), not including pedestal and base) statue of Lenin which had been installed on the grounds was moved to Central Park to increase its public visibility.

In 1989 a modern seven-storey building with 360 beds and kitchens, a dining room, a recreation center, a movie theater, and other services was commissioned.

=== Recent history and current status ===
Tuberculosis patients from all regions of Russia continue to be treated at Lesnoye Sanatorium, which is now owned and operated by the Russian federal government. The current capacity is 360 beds. The main methods of treatment are medication, diet, and kumis.

Today, the kumis is made from cow's milk. It is slightly inferior in its medicinal properties to natural mare's kumis. In 1996, a private goat farm was established on the grounds of the sanatorium, to provide goat's milk for medicinal purposes to patients of the sanatorium and to children in the city.

In 1993, the facade and grounds of the Lesnoye Sanatorium were declared a monument of architecture and history of the Samara region, and they are included in the official register of monuments of Tolyatti. A picture of Lesnoye Sanatorium is on the labels of the local brandy "Stavropol-on-Volga".

Lesnoye Sanatorium celebrated its centennial in 2010. A forest fire, one of the many 2010 Russian wildfires of that hot dry summer, destroyed large swaths of the surrounding forest. The sanatorium was saved, but was closed from 30 July to 10 December 2010. Another huge forest fire broke out near the sanatorium in July 2021.
