= Funland Park =

Amusement park in Tolyatti, Russia

Coordinates: 53°31′04.3″N 49°16′10.1″E

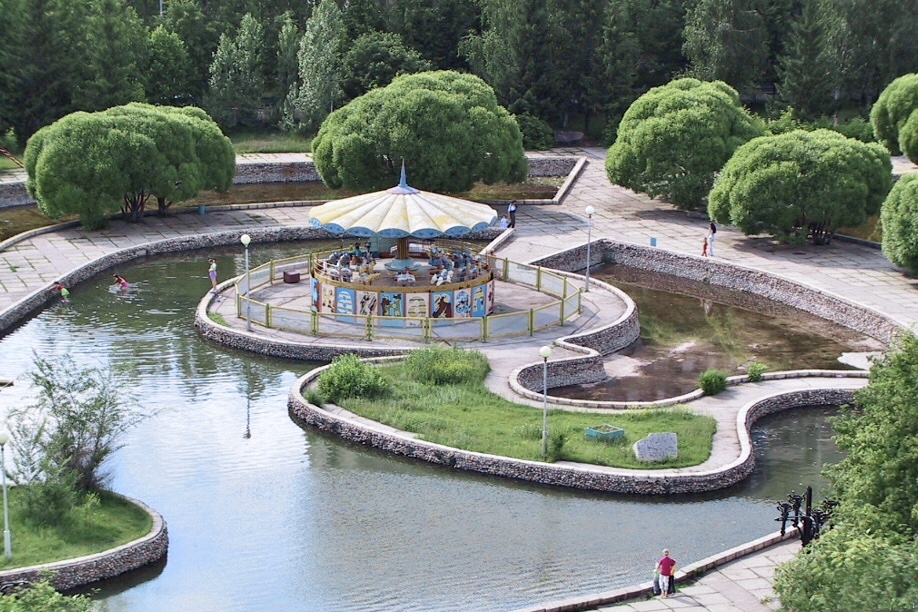
View of part of the Children's Park area of Funland Park

Funland Park (Russian: фанны парк (Note: Literally "Funny Park") or Funland Amusement Park (Russian: фанны парк развлечений) is a family park in the Russian city of Tolyatti. Slightly under 8 hectares (20 acres) in area, it is located in the Auto Factory District, less than a kilometer northwest of Victory Park. It contains many amusement rides and similar attractions, but also quiet areas of trees, grass, and ponds.

Among the attractions are a steel rollercoaster, the Cyclone; go karts and bumper cars; a large Ferris wheel; a large outdoor swimming pool (in winter there is ice skating); arcades and cafes; a petting zoo; a butterfly glade; and other rides and attractions.

Various special events and celebrations are held at the park on public holidays and at other times. The "Oodles of Animals" event (Russian: Жизнь замечательных зверей), besides providing entertainment, results in many animals from the city's animal shelters being adopted. In winter, an entire small town made of ice, the "Magical Fairyland of Ice", is constructed.

The park was built by AvtoVAZ as a recreation place for young families, most of them workers at the AvtoVAZ automobile plant. The park opened in 1980, had 11 rides by 1987, and was named Funland in 2005.
