= Central Park (Tolyatti) =

Park in Tolyatti, Russia

Coordinates: 53°30′35.5″N 49°25′07.2″E

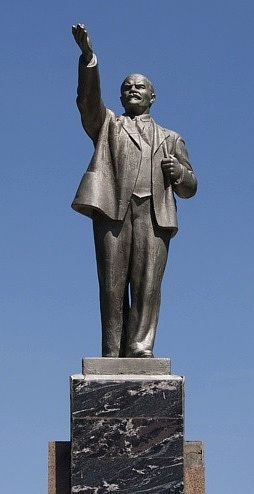
Lenin monument in Central Park

Central Park (Russian: Центральный парк, full name Central Park of Culture and Recreation) is a park in the center of the Russian city of Tolyatti. The three main streets of Tolyatti's Central District – Karl Marx, Lenin, and Victory – radiate from its north side; Peace Street defines its south edge.

There was originally a small airfield on the site. When it was decided to replace this with a park, students from School #19 planted trees there: poplars, maples, and elms. Over time, the trees grew, and the park became a popular site for relaxation.

The park has been, since Soviet times, a nexus of proletarian sculpture. Sculptures in the park include Mourning Angel, a large monument to Lenin, a monument to the builders of the Volga Hydroelectric Station, and others.

There are or have been various recreational facilities and activities in the park: an ice-skating rink, dancing, and rides including a Ferris wheel (dismantled in May 2008; a large new one was constructed a few years later in Funland Park). In 2014, city parks chief Oleg Moskalev announced that four new attractions had been ordered from Italy – a railroad, two mini-jets for children, and a trampoline – which would bring the total of rides to 18.

The Lenin monument was installed in Central Park on April 22, 1980. It had previously been on the grounds of the Lesnoye Sanatorium, but it was decided that this location was too remote. The sculptor N. I. Kolesnikov oversaw the transfer to Central Park. The sculpture is a copy of 1924 statue "The Leader's Call" by Georgii Dmitrievich Alekseev, which shows Lenin orating and which was widely reproduced in the Soviet Union. The statue is concrete on a bronze-stained concrete pedestal faced with marble slabs. The statue is 3 metres (9.8 ft) tall and the pedestal 5 metres (16 ft).
