= History of Transport (sculptures) =

Coordinates: 53°31′25″N 49°16′38″E

History of Transport (Russian: История транспорта) is a series of three monumental sculptures in the Russian city of Tolyatti. The monument was designed in 1975 when the master plan for the Auto Factory District (Russian: Автозаводский район, Avtozavodsky rajon) of Tolyatti was created. The sculptures were erected in the years 1977–1979 in a strip of parkland between Revolution Street and Anniversary Street. As of 2014 they are endangered.

== Description ==
The sculptures are stylized representations of three modes of transport extant at the turn of the 20th century: a paddle-wheel steamboat, a steam locomotive, and a hot air balloon.

"Hot Air Balloon" is a fantastic representation that combines a balloon, gondola, and sails with figures of balloonists. The 10-metre (33 ft) sculpture seems to be striving upwards, but held by anchor ropes and streamers; a light, delicate design mounted on a heavy prism-shaped foundation, somewhat reminiscent of the balloon in Jules Verne's novel Five Weeks in a Balloon. The dimensions are 10 metres (33 ft) by 6 metres (20 ft) by 6 metres (20 ft).

"The First Steamboat" is composed of readily recognizable elements of a ship: hull, mast, yards, sails, anchor, flag, and so on. The steam-driven sidewheeler includes metal "smoke" discharging from the smokestack. On deck is a symbolic romantic couple of the era: a man in a top hat and a woman with a parasol. The sculpture is not a realistic representation of an actual steamboat, and contains many decorative, purely artistic elements. The dimensions are 10 metres (33 ft) by 6 metres (20 ft) by 3 metres (9.8 ft).

"The First Locomotive" is generally similar in design and effect. The dimensions are 10 metres (33 ft) by 6 metres (20 ft) by 2.5 metres (8.2 ft).

According to critics, the composition is beautifully designed, and well planned to foil defacement by hooligans.

The sculptures are made of iron (forged, cast, and welded) on massive reinforced concrete pedestals and limestone slabs.

The sculptor is People's Artist of the USSR Andrei Vasnetsov (grandson of Viktor Vasnetsov). The architect is Central Research and Design Institute of Residential and Public Buildings architect and USSR State Prize laureate E. Ioheles (brother of pianist Alexander Ioheles).

== Endangerment ==
In 2011, due to failure of diligence on the part of the Tolyatti municipal government, the land on which the sculptures stand was found to have passed to private ownership. The owners planned to demolish them and build commercial structures on the site, and a lawsuit by the city to prevent this failed, the judge ruling that the city had failed to prove that the sculptures are a significant cultural heritage. In response, the mayor of Tolyatti, Anatoly Pushkov, said:

The sculptures will not be demolished. There may be a court decision that the land belongs to a private company but it means nothing. We will do everything possible to ensure that the sculptures are preserved, at all hazards. They are a unique visual symbol of our city. Perhaps the sculptures will be moved to another location.

— Anatoly Pushkov, TLT Times

On the other hand, some commentators held that the sculptures were made in the mode of Soviet times and no longer fit in with the modern spirit of the city.

As of 2014, debate about the fate of the sculptures continued, in connection with discussion about the sale of the land. The mayor's office, in the fall of 2014, included the sculptures in the Tolyatti's beautification program of iconic and socially significant places, so that rather than being destroyed they will be enhanced. Beyond this, their fate is not settled. Possible new locations for the sculptures are Victory Park, a proposed new family holiday park to be called 19 Districts, the area in front of the local history museum, and other places.
