= 1769 in Russia =

This is a list of notable events from the year 1769 in Russia.

== Incumbents ==
- Monarch – Catherine II (Note: Russian: Екатерина Великая, romanized: Yekaterina Velikaya.)

== Events ==
- Russo-Turkish War (1768–74): Russian forces take the Ottoman fortress of Chocim in Bukovina.

== Birth ==
- Aleksey Arakcheyev, Russian general
- Ekaterina Feodorovna Baryatinskaya-Dolgorukova, Russian court official
- Yevgeni Ivanovich Markov, Russian infantry commander
- Georgiy Evseevich Eristov, Russian nobleman
- Pyotr Aleksandrovich Tolstoy, Russian general
- Boris Vladimirovich Golitsyn, Russian aristocrat

== Death ==
- Vasily Trediakovsky, Russian poet
- Stepan Glotov, Russian navigator
