= Mourning Angel =

Monument in Tolyatti, Samara Oblast, Russia

Coordinates: 53.509652°N 49.421299°E

The monument in 2006

Mourning Angel is a public monument in the Russian city of Tolyatti. It is a memorial to victims of political repression.

Niyaz Azizovich Yalymov, head of the Tolyatti organization Victims of Political Repression proposed in 1999 that such a memorial be constructed. In 2000 a design competition was held. Of five finalists, the entry of Igor Burmistenko was accepted.

The statue was installed on the Veteran's Mall of Tolyatti Central Park and was opened on October 30 (the Day of Remembrance of the Victims of Political Repressions), 2005. The bronze figure was not yet ready, so a temporary plaster version was installed for the opening, then removed. The bronze statue was installed in April 2006.

Total cost for creation of the monument was 8 million rubles, shared by the regional and city governments.

The sculptor, Igor Burmistenko, a member of the Union of Artists of the Russian Federation (and before that of the USSR Union of Artists) died five years into the project, and the statue was finished by the project architect I. N. Prokopenko and cast in bronze by V. A. Fomin.

The memorial complex is a square with granite panels around the perimeter. At one side is the bronze figure of the sitting angel, 2.8 metres (9.2 ft) tall, on a granite pedestal, head slightly bowed. In the hands of the angel are an open book inscribed with words from Ecclesiastes 3:5, "A Time to Gather Stones".

On the wall behind the angel are two granite slabs. On one are excerpts from the Constitution of the Russian Federation and the Universal Declaration of Human Rights of the United Nations. The other lists the name of 171 residents of the area who were sentenced to death for political reasons and later rehabilitated.

In January 2007, the memorial complex was attacked by teenaged hooligans who smashed lights and damaged lamposts. The damage was not soon repaired, and maintenance of the monument lagged in general. The monument is also used by miscreants as a venue for skateboarding stunts.

The sculpture acquired a new symbolism after the Tolyatti bus bombing of 2007 (eight killed, 56 injured), which occurred on October 31, the morning after the Day of Remembrance of the Victims of Political Repressions. The actual site of the bombing was closed for forensic investigation, so grieving citizens gathered at the Mourning Angel (near the site of the bombing) and lit candles.
