= World Artists Association =

World Artists Association (Chinese: 世界艺术家协会}), is an organization of artists around the world it is also one of the largest artist associations with a broad international influence of arts groups. It promotes the development of arts in the world and hosts international art exchanges. It has organized "International Chinese Artists’ Art Exhibition" successfully for 12 years. The "Reference News" of Xinhua News Agency said in 1998: "This is the largest exchange of Chinese art in the world". This exhibition has become an important stage for the art exchange of world artists.

There are more than 300 Chinese and international newspapers, magazines and medias reporting on the World Artist Association. Such as The World Artists, The People's Daily, Guangming Daily, China Culture Daily{}, Ta Kung Pao (Hong Kong), Wen Hui Bao (Hong Kong), China Times (Taiwan), Central Daily News (Taiwan), China Daily (Thailand), World Journal, Sing Tao Daily, China Times (Japan), Jing Journal (Mauritius), Jiahua Times (United States), Southeast European Times (France), Xinhua News Agency, China News Agency, China National Radio, China Central Television.
