= Central Square (Tolyatti) =

Square in Tolyatti, Samara Oblast, Russia

Coordinates: 53°30′28″N 49°25′13″E

View of Central Square, with statue of Saint Nicholas in the foreground and monument to the city's founders in the background

Central Square is an area of Tolyatti. It is located in the Central District, directly south-southeast of Central Park, near the core of the cultural and political life of the city. It is often called the City Garden by the populace rather than Central Square.

Central Square is bounded by World Peace Street on the north, Central Street on the west, and Leningrad Street on the south. To the east is mixed terrain including parkland; Central Square itself is mixed terrain, including parkland, parking lots, buildings, and monuments. The entirety, which includes large stretches of bare asphalt and random structures, does not necessarily present a pleasing aspect or sense of unified design.

Within Central Square itself is the Lada Star hotel (one of the older buildings in the square), a monument to the founders of the city done in an "old Russian" style, and a statue of Saint Nicholas the Miracle Worker. There is a small chapel, the Chapel of the Nativity of Christ, erected in 2000, designed in the old style with a golden dome and stained-glass windows. There are also restaurants, trees, and walking paths. Festivals and fairs are held in Central Square.

The building where the Tolyatti City Duma (City Council) meets is directly west of Central Square, across Central Street. (This is not to be confused with Tolyatti City Hall, the administrative center, which is three-quarters of a mile (1.2. kilometers) northwest, at Liberty Square.) In Soviet times this building housed the City Committee of the Communist Party.

== Palace of Culture ==
Also within Central Square is the Palace of Culture, Arts, and Creativity (informally called just the Palace of Culture), one of the largest cultural centers in Tolyatti. The neo-classical building was constructed in 1976 in Soviet times; after various interim forms, the institution was converted in 2004 to an open joint-stock company.

The Palace of Culture is one of the city's largest venue for plays and concerts. Musicals, holiday extravaganzas, and other shows are presented there. The Palace also hosts corporate events.

The Palace also hosts vocal, dance and acting workshops for children; other child or family centered activities are a bowling alley, laser tag arena, and the Emerald City, a large indoor children's space featuring a carousel, giant bubble maker, slides and other play structures, and other attractions. Birthday parties are hosted there.
