= Yevgeny Makarov =

Russian prisoner (died 2022)

Yevgeny Makarov was a Russian prisoner who was tortured in prison. In 2018, a leaked video of him being tortured in a Russian prison provoked significant outcry, leading to an official investigation and the conviction of 13 prison guards.

== Biography ==
In 2011, he was sentenced to six years and 10 months incarceration in Yaroslavl on charges of robbery and battery.

In 2017, Makarov's lawyer lodged a complaint with the European Court of Human Rights over his treatment in prison. Later that year, a 10-minute video was filmed inside the prison in which over a dozen prison guards were pinning him down on a table and torturing him, including stripping him, physically beating him, and waterboarding him. Following the torture, he was placed in solitary confinement. The video was then leaked to independent newspaper Novaya Gazeta, who published it. Following a significant outcry, the Federal Penitentiary Service announced that it would be launching a formal investigation into torture allegations in Russian prisons, and 14 prison guards in Yaroslavl were arrested. Makarov's lawyer was subsequently forced to flee Russia after receiving death threats.

In October 2018, he was released from prison. In November 2020, 13 people were convicted of abuse of office over his case, with sentences up to 51-months. However, both the prison director and the deputy prison director were acquitted of the charges against them. In July 2022, Makarov died of pneumonia at the age of 29.
