= Ivan Barkov =

Russian poet (d. 1768)

Ivan Semyonovich Barkov
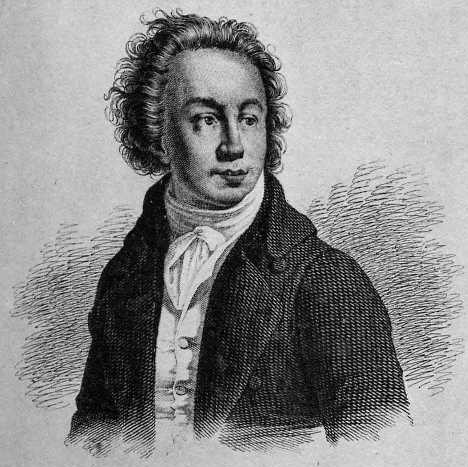
- Born: 1732; Russian Empire
- Died: 1768 (aged 36); Saint Petersburg, Russian Empire
- Occupations: Poet, translator

Ivan Semyonovich Barkov (Russian: Ива́н Семёнович Барко́в, IPA: [ɪˈvan sʲɪˈmʲɵnəvʲɪdʑ bɐrˈkof]; c. 1732–1768) was a Russian poet, the author of erotic "Shameful Odes". He was a student of Mikhail Lomonosov, whose works he frequently parodied. He was also a translator and editor at the Russian Academy of Sciences.

== Biography ==
Ivan Barkov was born in 1732 in the family of an Orthodox priest. In 1744 he entered an Orthodox Seminary where he spent 5 years. In 1748 at Lomonosov's recommendation he was admitted to the Academic Gymnasium. Language and poetry were his fields of study. He was an uneven student, and he repeatedly was subjected to corporal punishment (whippings) for drunkenness, insolence, and slander against the rector. In 1751 he was demoted to a typesetter at the academy's printing workshop, and in 1753 he was promoted to the position of a scribe in the academy's administrative office.

In 1755-56 he was Lomonosov's personal secretary, and in this period he wrote "A Brief History of Russia", which was published in 1762. In 1759-60 he edited the medieval "Nestor's Chronicle" for publication. In 1756 he was dismissed from the academy for drunkenness and insubordination, after several reprieves, and reinstated until final dismissal in 1766.

Barkov translated Horace's Odes into Russian in 1763, Phaedr's Fables in 1764, and Ludovico Lazzaroni's "Il Mondo degli Eroi" in 1763.

He died in 1768. There were widespread rumors that he died either in a suicide, with the autoepitaph Жил грешно и умер смешно (lived sinfully and died ridiculously) "on a piece of paper inserted into his anus", or in an outhouse drowning.

== Poetry ==
Barkov was highly regarded as an able interpreter and a poet. Since poetry was his hobby more than his job, he could afford to use simpler language in his work. Most of his poems are outrightly obscene or even pornographic, although very funny. Written copies of his work circulated Russia since their creation.

Several works commonly yet erroneously ascribed to Barkov actually date from the 1840-60s.

== Legacy ==
Ivan Barkov had a major impact on Russian language and later literati. His name is being brought up in any dispute on introduction of slang words into language, and, although his verses were unpublished for a very long time for being immoral, written copies of his work could always be found in student environments.

== Books ==
Kniaz'kin, I.V. Russkii Priap Ivan Barkov ISBN 5-93630-240-7 Pages: 224 Publisher: DEAN Year: 2002
