= Avdotya Vorobyeva =

Russian opera singer

Avdotya Vorobyova (Russia: Авдотья Ивановна Воробьёва; 1768-1836), was a Russian stage actress and opera singer (soprano). She was trained at the St Petersburg Imperial Theatre School and engaged at the Imperial Theatres in 1787-1836. She was a prominent artist, known for her parts in French plays and Italian opera performances.
