= Tolyatti Pine Forest =

Forest in Tolyatti, Russia

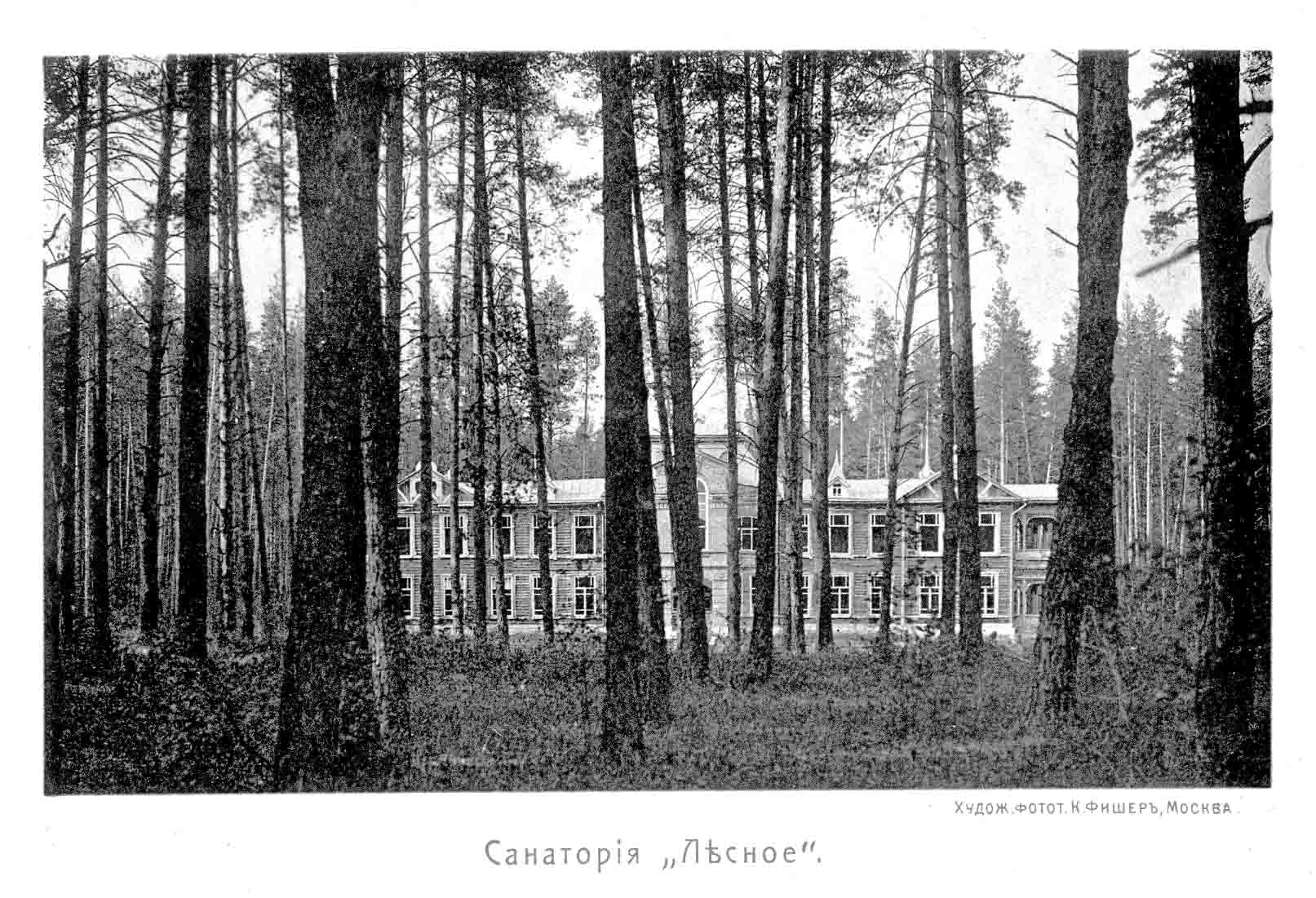
Stavropol Pine Forest before the revolution, Lesnoye Sanatorium visible through the trees

The Tolyatti Pine Forest or Green Zone is a large forest in the middle of the Russian city of Tolyatti. It lies between and separates the three districts of the city (Auto Factory, Central, and Komsomol) from each other. It encompasses about one-quarter of the area of Tolyatti. A natural old-growth forest, it is a prime spot for city dwellers to escape the industrial confines of Tolyatti.

The forest is a protected monument of regional significance by declaration of the provincial government of Samara Oblast. Lesnoye Sanatorium, in the middle of the forest (thus its name, which means "Sanatorium in the Forest") is also a protected monument of regional importance. At the time the Sanatorium was established in 1910, it was on the outskirts of Stavropol-on-Volga; since the city was moved (and renamed), it is now near its center.

The forest includes cross-country skiing paths for winter recreation and tennis courts, miniature golf, and a swimming pool for summer.

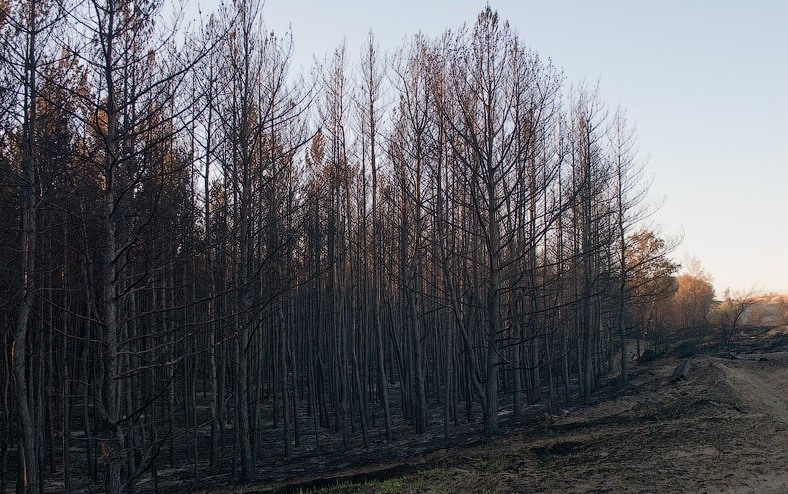
After the conflagration

In 2010 (a summer of record heat and widespread fires throughout Russia) the forest was subject to a catastrophic forest fire which devastated large areas of the forest. This was one of the many 2010 Russian wildfires. The Lesnoye Sanatorium was saved (although it had to be evacuated and was closed for more than four months), but crown fires and ground fires devastated large sections of the forest.
