= 1772 in Russia =

Events from the year 1772 in Russia

== Incumbents ==
- Monarch – Catherine II

== Events ==
- The First Partition of Poland - Russia, Prussia, and Austria signed an agreement. Russia annexed Belorussia (Belarus) and parts of Livonia, gaining roughly 36,000 square miles of territory and over 1.3 million new subjects.
- Mogilev Governorate - the governorate was formed
- Zhivopisets - a weekly magazine
- The Congress of Focșani (Russo-Turkish War) - Russia entered peace talks with the Ottoman Empire
- The Battle of Patras - a Russian imperial naval squadron defeated an Ottoman fleet in the Gulf of Patras
- Establishment of the Pale of Settlement - Catherine the Great restricted Jewish merchants and citizens to newly annexed western territories and forbidding them from moving into Russia's interior provinces.

== Births ==
- Mikhail Speransky (12 January 1772 in Cherkutino, Russia) - a Russian statesman and reformer during the reigns of Alexander I and Nicholay I
- Baron Balthasar von Campenhausen (January 5, 1772) - a Russian statesman, the Governor of Taganrog from 1805 to 1809, Russia's Minister of Internal Affairs in 1823
- Pyotr Papkov (1772) - a Russian nobleman and military officer

== Deaths ==
- December 26 - Pyotr Saltykov, Russian statesman and a military officer. (born c. 1697/1698/1700)
- March 21 - Alexander Kokorinov - a Russian architect and educator
