= Sandor Zicherman =

Hungarian artist (1935–2021)

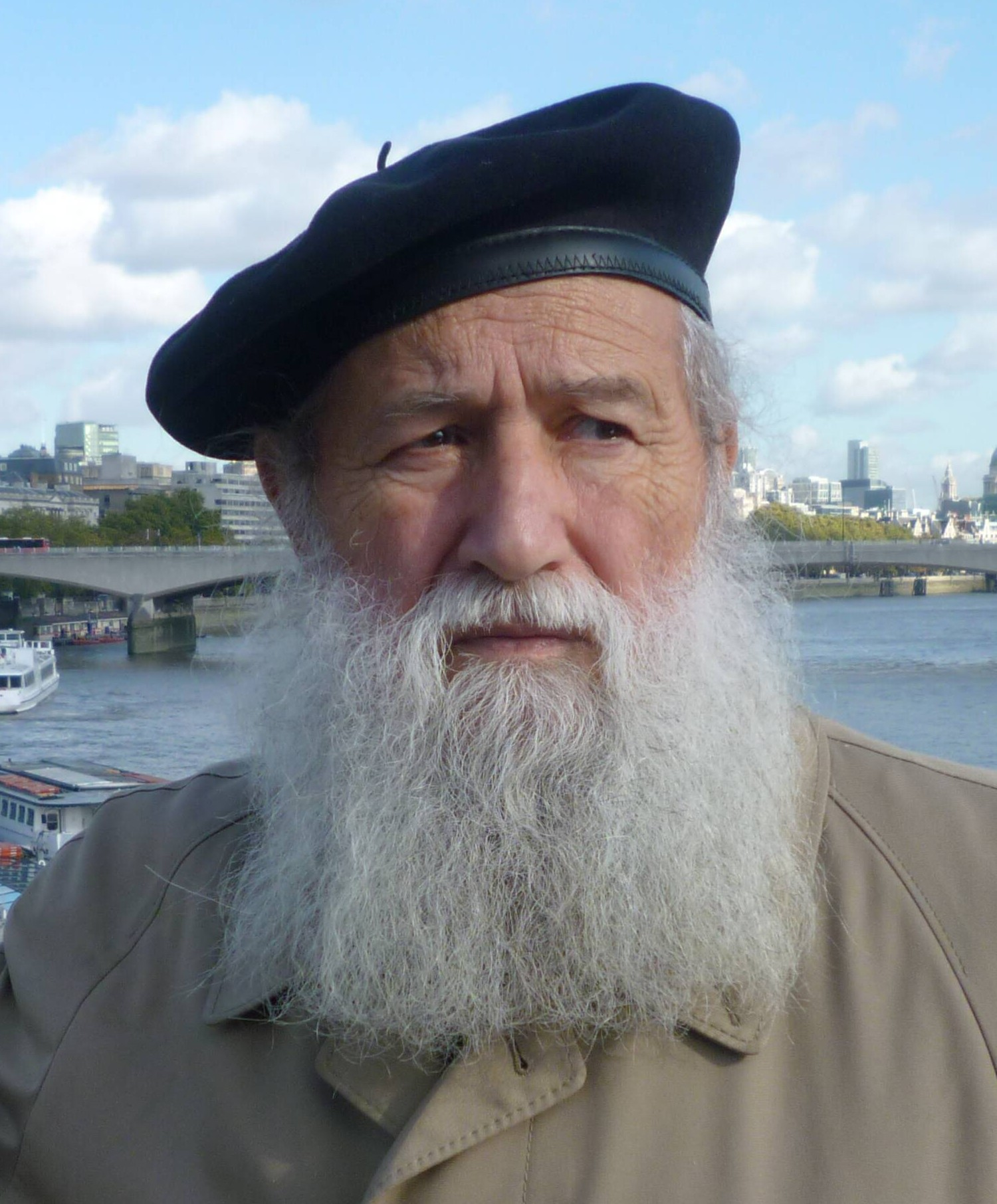
- Sandor Zicherman in 2011
- Born: Sándor Róbert Zicherman; 6 April 1935; Uzhhorod, Czechoslovakia
- Died: 29 November 2021 (aged 86); Budapest, Hungary
- Website: www.zicherman.eu

Sándor Róbert Zicherman (Russian: Шандор Зихерман; 6 April 1935 – 29 November 2021) was a Soviet and Hungarian artist.

Zicherman was a member of the Union of Russian Artists since 1965, and was a member of the MAOE (Association of Hungarian Creators), the Association of Hungarian Fine and Applied Artists, the Hungarian Sculptor's Society, the World Artists Association, the AIAP (Association International des Arts Plastiques), and FIDEM (International Art Medal Federation). His works have been displayed at The Hermitage and many other museums.

He lived in Budapest, Hungary. He was married to an actress, Zinaida Zicherman, and had two daughters and two sons.

== Life ==
Sándor Robert Zicherman was born on 6 April 1935 in Uzhhorod, Czechoslovakia (today Ukraine). He spent his childhood and started his studies in Berehove (Beregszász) which is now located at the Ukrainian-Hungarian border.

In 1957, as a self-taught painter, he participated in his first exhibition at the Gallery of Fine Arts in Uzhgorod. In 1958 he was accepted to the College of Arts and Crafts in Lwow and started his professional studies at the faculty of monumental painting. After the first year he moved to Leningrad where he continued his studies at the Vera Mukhina Higher School of Art and Design (now the Saint Petersburg State Art and Industry Academy), also at the monumental painting faculty.

After graduating in 1964, Zicherman moved to Perm in the Ural region, where he worked for the Fine Arts Foundation on a number of commissions, as a specialist in monumental art. In Perm and the surrounding region he produced a number of frescos, mosaics, sgraffiti, and ceramic high reliefs, and also three large gobelins (tapestries after the manner of the Gobelins).

In addition to executing works linked to architecture, Zicherman also worked for Perm Television and the Perm theatres. In 1966, after participating in the art exhibition "Socialist Urals" sponsored by the Russian Soviet Republic he was accepted to the USSR Union of Artists as a candidate member, and in 1975 as a full member. Between 1969 and 1972 he worked and lived in a number of different cities and regions including Lviv, Jūrmala, Riga, Elista, and Moscow.

In 1972 Zicherman moved to Tolyatti (formerly Stavropol-on-Volga) at the invitation of the city administration for the organization of cultural and artistic life. He contributed to the founding of the Tolyatti Lyceum of Arts art gallery, and was instrumental in founding the Tolyatti branch of the Union of Artists. In 1987, he organized Russia's first stone-carving sculpture symposium, in Tolyatti.

Zicherman later moved to Samara, Russia, where he married Zinaida Sokolova, and in 1989 to Budapest. Of this move to Hungary, he said that "[A]ll of us are of mixed nationalities, I do not know a single person who is one hundred percent Russian or Mordovian". He described himself as a Hungarian artist of Russian origin. In Budapest, he and his wife opened a Russian theater and studio at the Russian embassy.

== Works ==
By 1989 Sandor Zicherman had participated in great number All-Soviet and All-Russian exhibitions, including exhibitions representing Soviet art abroad (Hungary, Czechoslovakia, NDK, Poland). His exhibits included paintings to graphics, medals, ceramics, sculptures, and tapestries. His mosaics, sgraffitos and memorials are still on show in many Russian cities. In addition to participating in group exhibitions, by 1989 he had had more than 30 personal exhibitions in various cities of the Soviet Union and also participated in 13 different Soviet or international two-month symposiums. Since his move to Budapest in 1990 he has participated in more than 60 group and personal exhibitions in Budapest and other Hungarian cities, as well as a great number of European countries.

Zicherman does not adhere to a particular genre; among his works and graphics are portraits, avant-garde pieces, and classical landscapes, employing a variety of stylistic devices such as cubo-futurism, Post-Impressionism, and realism. In recent years, he has produced many works in the nu genre.

His work is represented in The Hermitage, the Samara State Fine Arts Museum, the Tolyatti Art Museum, the Museum of Regional Ethnography in Perm, the Museum of Fine Arts of the Udmurt Republic, the Technical Museum of Autovaz in Tolyatti, the Museum of Fine Arts of the Mari El Republic in Yoshkar-Ola, the Joseph Boksay Fine Art Museum of Transcarpathia in Uzhgorod, the Kalmyk Fine Art Museum in Elista, the Museum of Medal Art in Wrocław, the War History Museum in Budapest, and many other museums in Europe.

Every year, Zicherman returned to Russia, where he held a regular solo exhibition. In 2006, there was an exhibition of his works in Tolyatti, dedicated to the fortieth anniversary of AvtoVAZ. In 2007, the show was held in Samara.

Zicherman's work has sometimes been the target of thieves. In the early 1990s, he was one of the organizers of an exhibit from whence 171 pieces were stolen. In Samara, a plaque by Zicherman in honor of the 100th birthday of People's Artist George Shebuev was stolen, and in Tolyatti, a two-meter pink marble sculpture by Zicherman was stolen too.

Zicherman died from COVID-19 in 2021, at the age of 86, during the COVID-19 pandemic in Hungary.
