= Tolyatti bus bombing =

Terrorist attack that happened 31 October 2007 in Tolyatti, Russia

- Location of Samara Oblast in Russia
- Location: Tolyatti, Samara Oblast, Russia
- Date: 31 October 2007
- Target: Bus
- Weapon: Bomb
- Deaths: 8 (including the bomber)
- Injuries: about 50
- Perpetrator: Evgeny Vakhrushev
- Motive: Unknown

Location of Tolyatti in Samara Oblast

The Tolyatti bus bombing occurred on 31 October 2007, during the morning rush hour when a bomb exploded on a passenger bus in Tolyatti, a city in Samara Oblast, Russia. The blast killed at least eight people and injured about 50 in what Irina Doroshenko, a spokeswoman for the investigative wing of the local prosecutor's office, said could be a terrorist attack. At the beginning of the investigation, it was believed to be the work of terrorists from the North Caucasian Federal District. Early reports indicated possible involvement of Chechen terrorist Doku Umarov. However, the officials later named a 21-year-old Evgeny Vakhrushev, who also died in the blast, as the only person to be responsible for the tragedy.

The explosion happened near a bus stop in the city center as people were heading to work.
