= Vera Zavadovskaya =

Russian courtier (1768–1845)

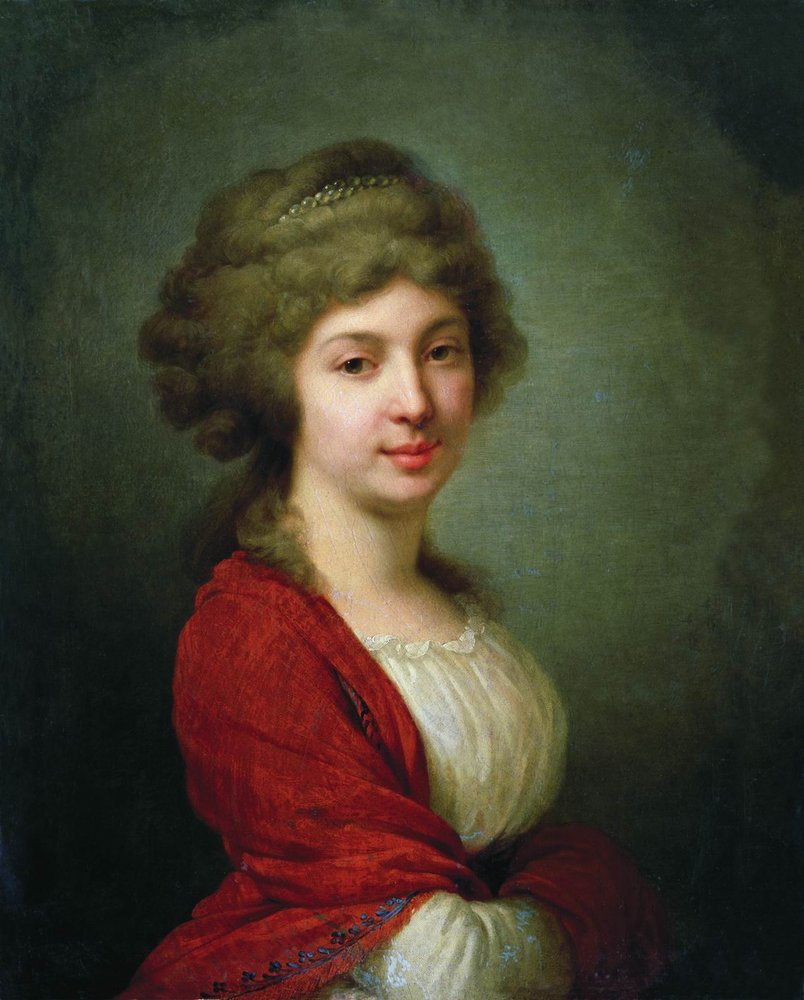
- Born: Vera Nikolaevna Apraksina; 2 November 1768; Saint Petersburg
- Died: 22 November 1845 (aged 77); Narva
- Noble family: Apraksin
- Spouse: Pyotr Zavadovsky
- Father: Count Nikolai Fedorovich Apraksin
- Mother: Countess Sofia Osipovna Zakrevskaya
- Occupation: Maid of honour to Catherine the Great

Countess Vera Nikolaevna Zavadovskaya (Russian: Ве́ра Никола́евна Завадо́вская, nee Apraksina, Russian: Апра́ксина; 2 November 1768 – 22 November 1845) was a Russian courtier. She served as maid of honour to Catherine the Great. She was married to Pyotr Zavadovsky and known for her love affair with Prince Ivan Baryatinsky and for being the mistress and muse of the poet Sergey Marin.

== Biography ==
Vera was born the only daughter of Lieutenant of the Horse Guards, Count Nikolai Fedorovich Apraksin from his marriage to a maid of honour, Sofia Osipovna Zakrevskaya, daughter of the Cossack Osip Zakrevsky who was raised to nobility, and Anna Grigorievna Razumovskaya (1722–1758), the beloved sister of Kirill and Alexei Razumovsky. Both of her younger brothers died in childhood.

Vera's mother, Sophia, had a great influence on her uncle Kirill Razumovsky, after the death of his wife in 1771, she moved with her family into his house where she became his mistress. Vera would live with her uncle from the age of two, until her marriage.

=== Marriage ===
By age 15, Vera's beauty began to attract the attention of men. She was tall, slender, and had dark eyes. Her mother, attempted to arrange a profitable match for her daughter. At the beginning of 1786, Vera was engaged to Pytor Petrovich Naryshkin (1764–1785), who had been recently widowed; (Note: In April 1785, P. P. Naryshkin’s first wife, Countess Maria Nikolaevna Saltykova (1766–1785), died; his second wife became Ekaterina Nikolaevna Opochinina (1766–1851) in 1786.) however, the arrangement fell through.

Vera was then engaged to Count Pytor Vasilievich Zavadovsky, aged 46, who spent his free time in Razumovsky's house, and had been the lover of Catherine the Great. The count was an enviable groom, rich, pleasing appearance, and possessed a charming manner. However, the relationship progressed slowly. Zavadovsky confessed to his friend Semyon Vorontsov "It is impossible not to love a girl who is kind and so well behaved; but this is not an obligation to marry".

In 1787, Kirill Razumovsky wrote to his son in law Ivan Gudovich:

"For a year, everything was treated like a bride and groom, postponing the public announcement of this act from month to month, and finally, after a month, he decided to be decisive. January has arrived; the court is moving away; He hasn't decided but he assures. Mother and daughter are extremely worried."

Eventually Catherine II intervened. Despite their relationship ending ten years prior, Zavadovsky had remained faithful. He wrote to her on the eve of the wedding:

"Without being a groom, I will appear married tomorrow. I surrender to an unknown fate, helped by your encouragement. Although I take a lamb from a mangy flock, I firmly hope in my spirit that the leprosy will not stop for me, just as something taken out of the mud can be cleaned, to not stain anyone's hands."

The wedding took place without any ceremony on 30 April 1787, in Gostilitsy near Saint Petersburg, which was owned by Alexei Razumovsky. In congratulations, the Empress sent Zavadovsky an image of the Saviour, and Vera was granted the position of maid of honour. The marriage introduced Zavadovsky into the circles of high aristocracy of the time, although it did not do much to support his career. The first six years, the couple lived without trouble. Though the happiness was short lived with six of their children dying in childhood. Within a period of six weeks in the autumn of 1793, their eldest surviving daughter and son died. Zavadovsky wrote of the occasion:

"I learned what joy is, what sorrow is from children: the crypt for five; one daughter, 6 months old remains, which does not bring encouragement, but rather trembling to the heart. What an unhappy father I am! Although live, I am struck by thunder; I don't feel my life..."

Depression and official troubles, which caused Zavadovsky to fall from grace under Paul I, forced the couple to live for a long time on the Lyalici estate. Village life was burdensome and boring for Vera, even though she married for love, she began to complain on melancholy:

"Never in my life have I felt more alone, and it would be difficult for me to get used to this kind of life, without even having a girlfriend with me. I do everything I can to appear cheerful in front of my husband, so as not to irritate him, but I don't know how long I can stand it."

In the 1790's correspondence of contemporaries, hints began to appear about the relationship of the Countess and a mysterious 'Abelard', as well as stormy scenes between the two spouses. Rumors began to spread in society in society that the father of Vera's later children, who survived, were the offspring of Prince Ivan Ivanovich Baryatinsky (1772-1825). The spouses separated but the relationship never came to an official end due to Zavadovsky's respect for his mother-in-law and Kirill Razumovsky. The couple's relationship appeared a mystery to the count's friends and acquaintances. Vera's reputation in society continued to decline. Semyon Vorontsov wrote to a friend:

"I would be glad for my son to stay with Count Zavadovsky if, unfortunately, my friend was not married to a completely dissolute woman. Youth has many charms for such a person: she would be able to seduce him."

== Issue ==
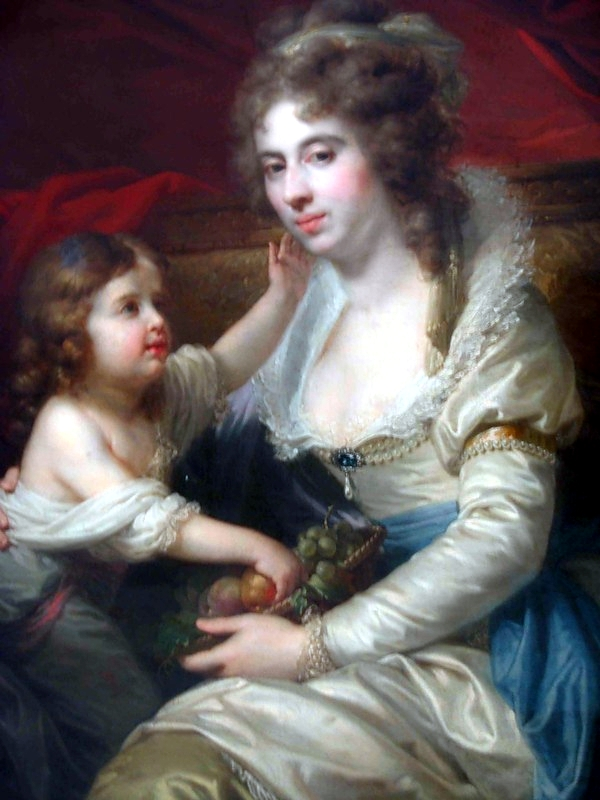
Vera and her daughter, Tatiana (the elder).

The Zavadovskys had ten daughters and four sons:

- Pelageya (6 February 1788 – 7 September 1788)
- Pelageya (2 December 1788 - ?), goddaughter of Marina Osipovna Naryshkina.
- Tatiana (1789 - November 1793)
- Peter (1790-1790)
- Maria (1 December 1790 - ?)
- Praskovya (1791-1792)
- Vasili (19 January 1792 - October 1793), baptise on 18 May 1793 in St. Isaac's Cathedral, godson of Alexander Vorontsov.
- Ekaterina (13 May 1793 - 1794), baptised 18 May 1793 in St. Isaac's Cathedral, goddaughter of her sister, Tatiana.
- Alexander (29 October 1794 - 27 October 1856) baptised 30 October 1794 in St. Isaac's Cathedral, godson of Alexander Bezborodko. Lietenant of the Alexander Hussar Regiment, chaimberlan, official of the College of Foreign Affairs, and a friend of Alexander Griboyedov. He would go abroad and live in London, and die unmarried.
- Sophia (1795 - 23 February 1829), Maid of Honour since 1811. She married Prince Vladimir Nikolaevich Kozlovsky (1790-1847) on 30 April 1815, though she would leave him due to alcoholism and marry A. M. Islenyev (1794 - 1882) though the marriage was not recognised. The children of this marriage were granted the surname Islavina and belonged to the merchant class. One of their daughters, Lyubov Aleksandrovna Islavinova (1826 - 1886) was the mother of Sophia Tolstaya.
- Varvara (17 March 1796 - before 1815), goddaughter of Countess E. P. Zavadovskaya.
- Peter (18 April 1797 - ?)
- Vasili (27 July 1798 - 10 October 1855), Chief Prosecutor of the Senate. He married Elena Mikhailovna Vlodek (1807 - 1874).
- Adelaide (Aglaida) (1 December 1799 - 13 June 1844), goddaughter of her sister Sophia, married F.I. Merzheevsky (d. 1851), leader of the Mogilev Region.
- Tatiana (19 April 1802 - 5 January 1844), married Senator Vladimir Ivanovich Kablukov (1781 - 1848).

== Sources ==
- В апреле 1785 года у П. П. Нарышкина умерла его первая жена графиня Мария Николаевна Салтыкова (1766–1785), второй женой его стала в 1786 году Екатерина Николаевна Опочинина (1766–1851).
