= Victory Park (Tolyatti) =

Memorial park in Tolyatti, Russia

Coordinates: 53.511°N 49.274°E

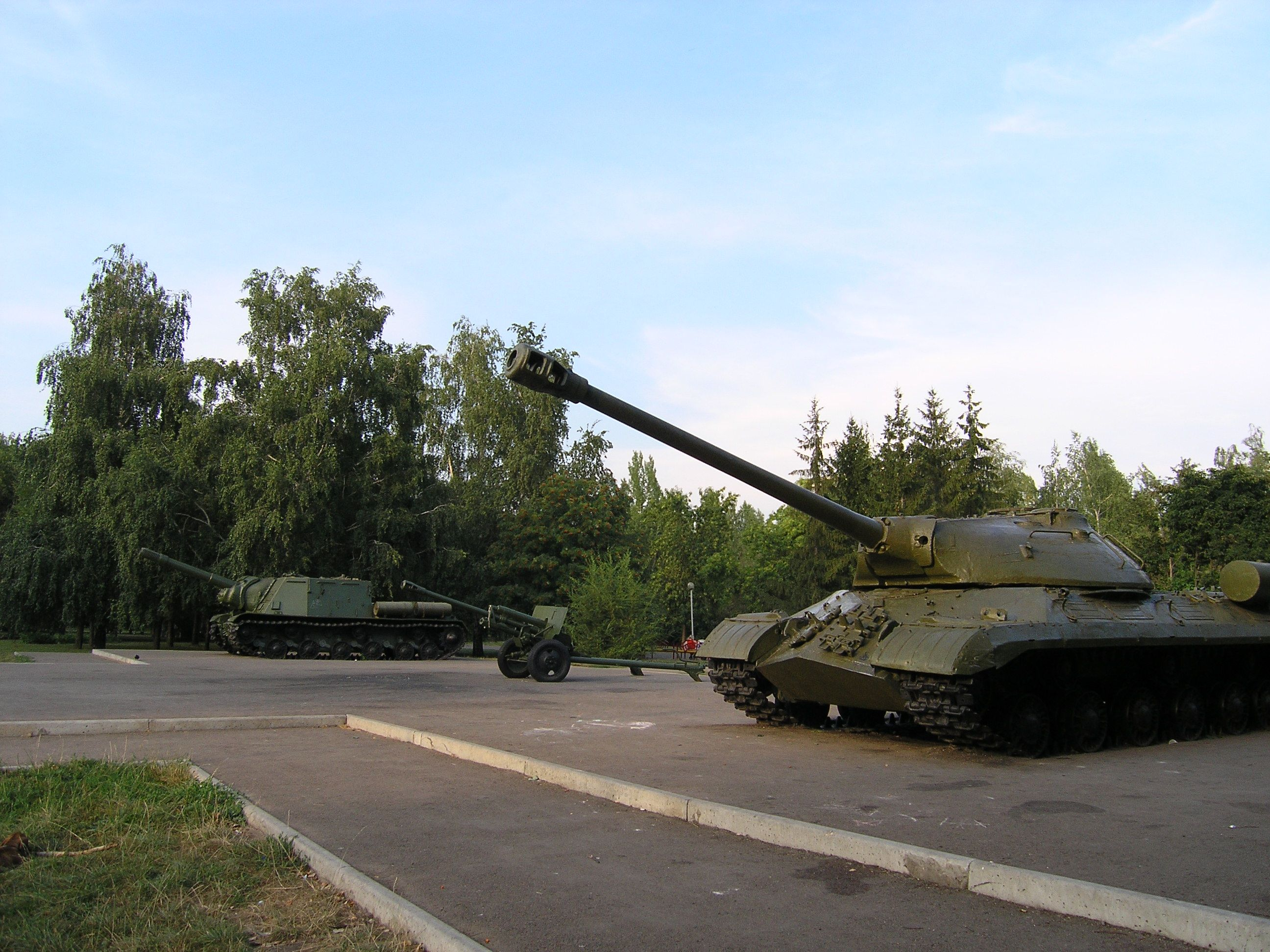
World War II ordnance at Victory Park

Monument to the Soldiers of the Afghan War

Victory Park (Russian: Парк Победы) is a memorial park in the Auto Factory District (Russian: Автозаводский район, Avtozavodsky rajon) of Tolyatti, Russia. The park is dedicated to the Soviet victory in World War II.

Among the monuments and sculptures in the park are:

- The Victory Monument (1985) by Simon Winograd
- Monument to the Soldiers of the Afghan War (1994) by N. I. Kolesnikov
- On The Beach (1987) by V. V. Kravchenk
Images of Victory Park
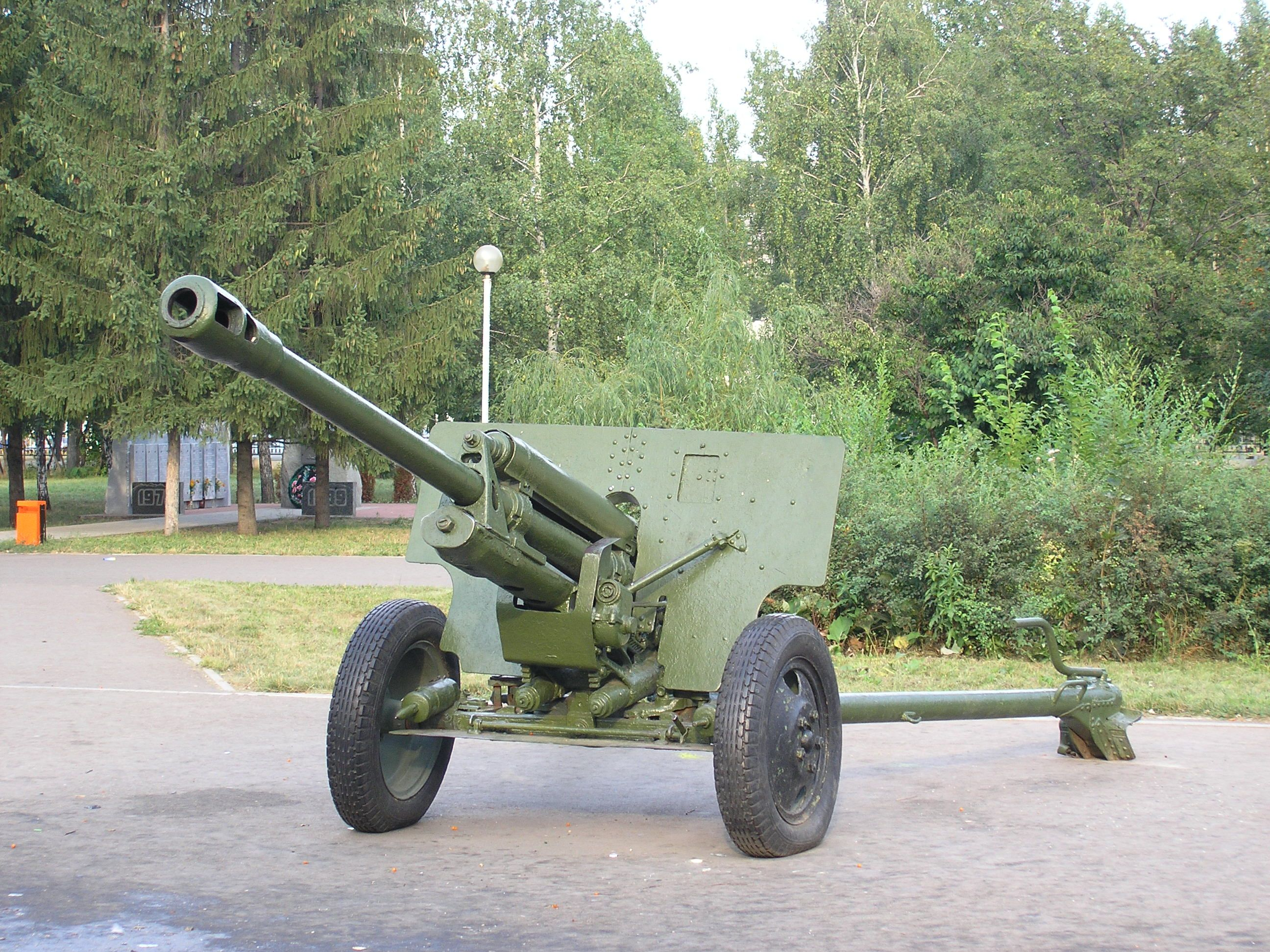
76mm cannon

Victory Memorial

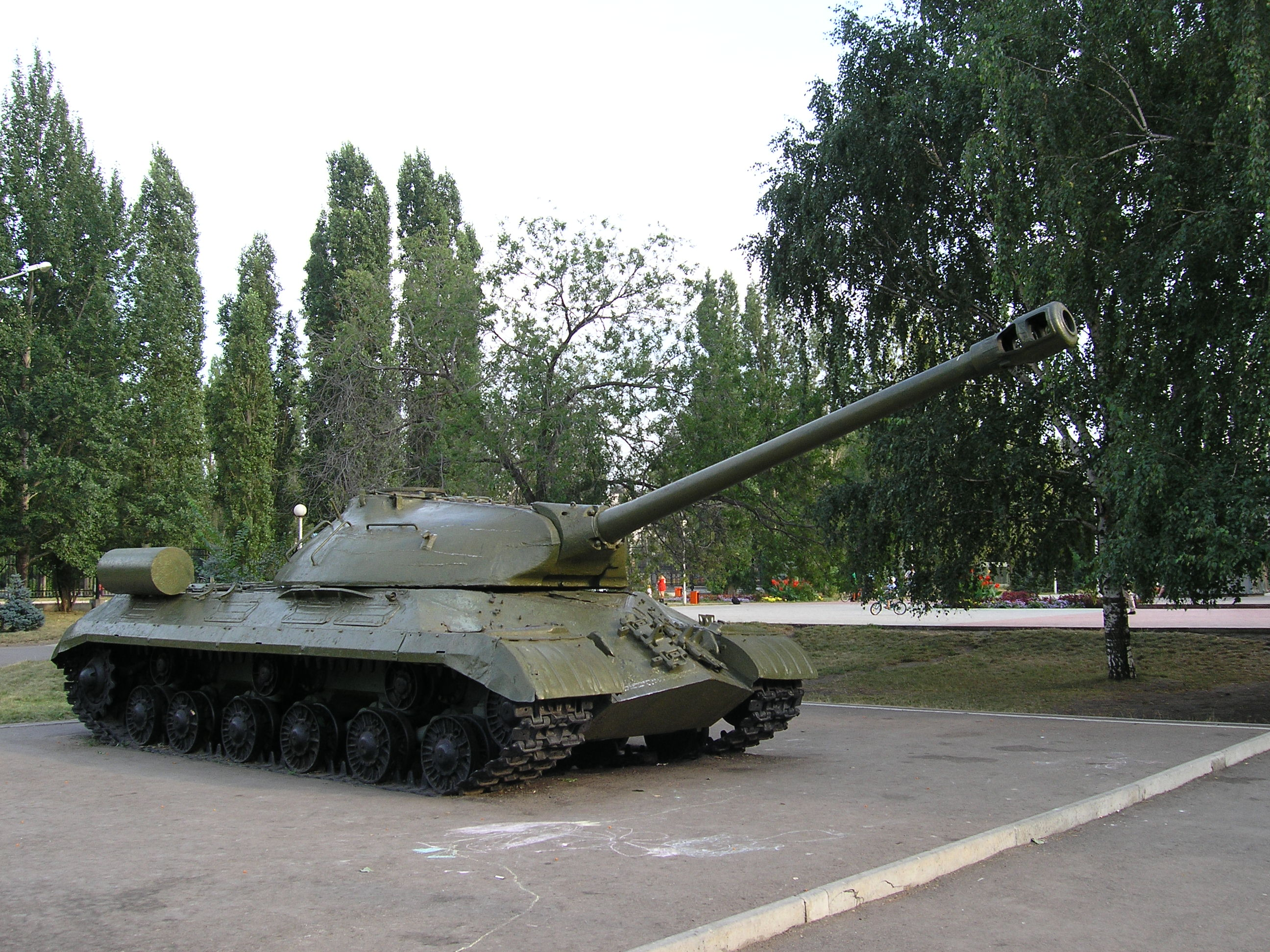
JS-3 heavy tank

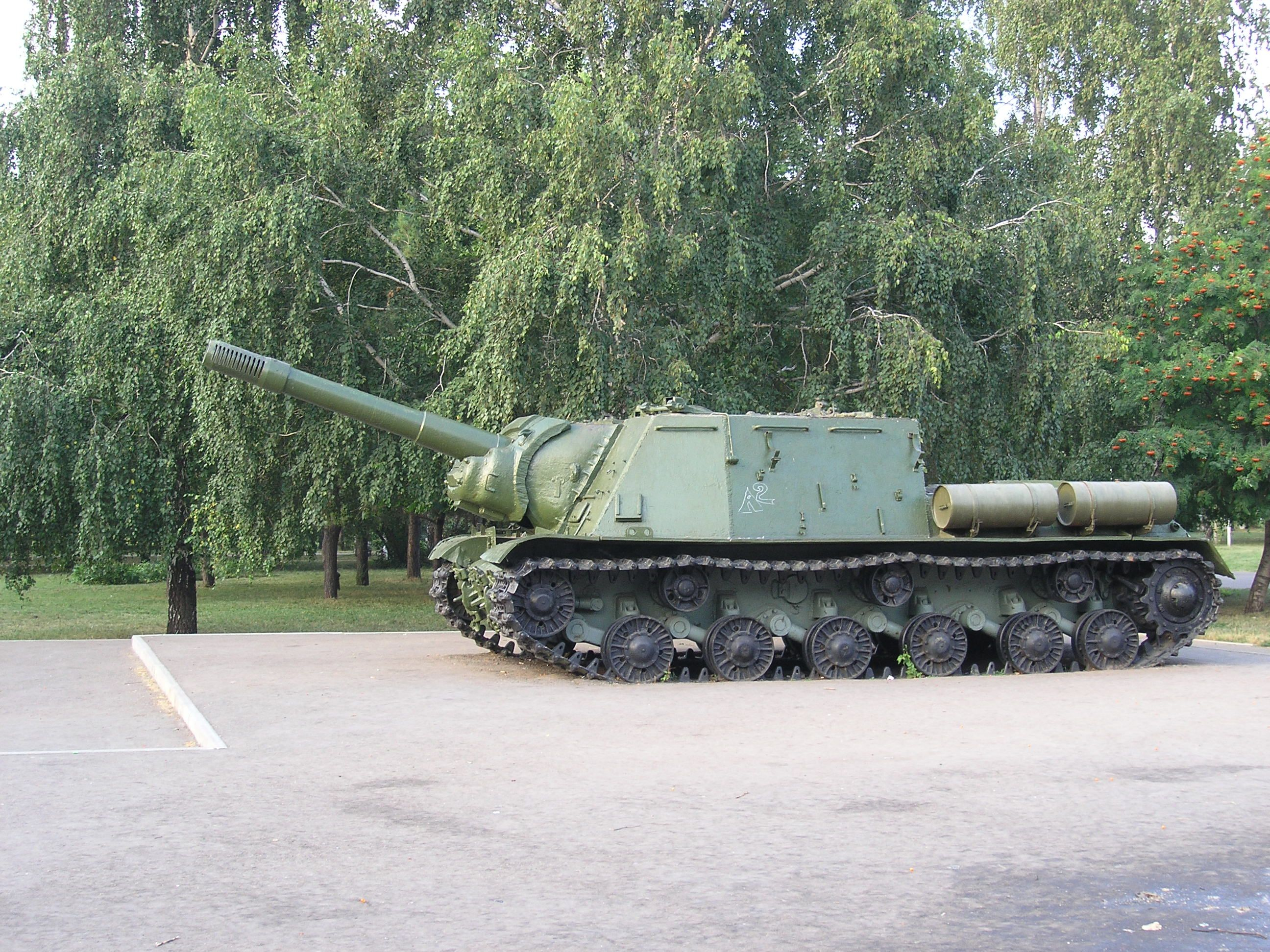
ISU-152 heavy assault gun.

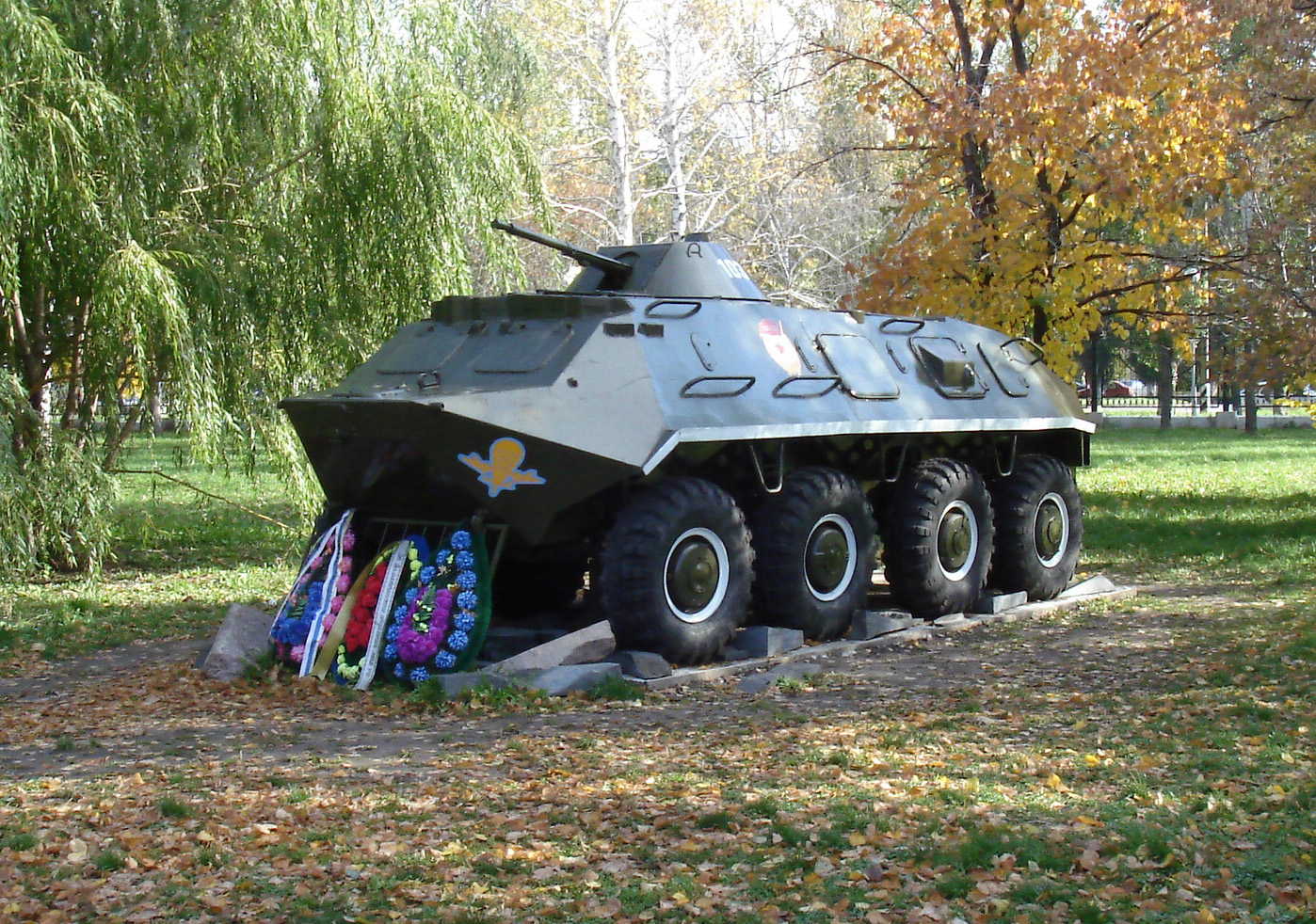
BTR-60 postwar armored personnel carrier
