= Another Life =

Another Life may refer to:

== Film and television ==
- Another Life (2001 film), a British film written and directed by Philip Goodhew
- Another Life (2013 film), a French film directed by Emmanuel Mouret
- Another Life (1981 TV series), a 1981–1984 American soap opera
- Another Life (2019 TV series), a 2019–2021 American science fiction series
- "Another Life" (The Twilight Zone), a 2003 TV episode

== Literature ==
- Another Life (novel), a 1975 novella by Yuri Trifonov
- Another Life: A Memoir of Other People, a 1999 memoir by Michael Korda
- Another Life, a 1973 poetry collection by Derek Walcott

== Music ==
=== Albums ===
- Another Life (Amnesia Scanner album) or the title song, 2018
- Another Life (Big Time Rush album) or the title song, 2023
- Another Life (Emphatic album) or the title song, 2013
- Another Life (Mark Stoermer album) or the title song, 2011
- Another Life, by James Maddock, 2013
- Another Life, by Kano, or the title song, 1983

=== Songs ===
- "Another Life" (Afrojack and David Guetta song), 2017
- "Another Life" (The Collective song), 2013
- "Another Life" (Motionless in White song), 2019
- "Another Life", by Ingrid Michaelson from It Doesn't Have to Make Sense, 2016
- "Another Life", by Iron Maiden from Killers, 1981
- "Another Life", by Johnny A. from Get Inside, 2004
- "Another Life", by Key from Gasoline, 2022
- "Anotherlife", by Nilüfer Yanya from Painless, 2022
- "Another Life", by PinkPantheress from Heaven Knows, 2023
- "Another Life", by Riize from Odyssey, 2025
- "Another Life", by Rüfüs Du Sol from Solace, 2018
- "Another Life", by SZA from Lana, 2024
- "Another Life", by Westlife from Spectrum, 2019

== See also ==
- Another Life...Another End, an album by Winter's Verge, 2006
- Another Lifetime (disambiguation)
- Another Live, an album by Utopia, 1975
- In Another Life (disambiguation)
