= House on the Embankment =

Apartment building in Moscow, Russia

Coordinates: 55°44′41″N 37°36′43″E

House on Embankment; Дом на набережной
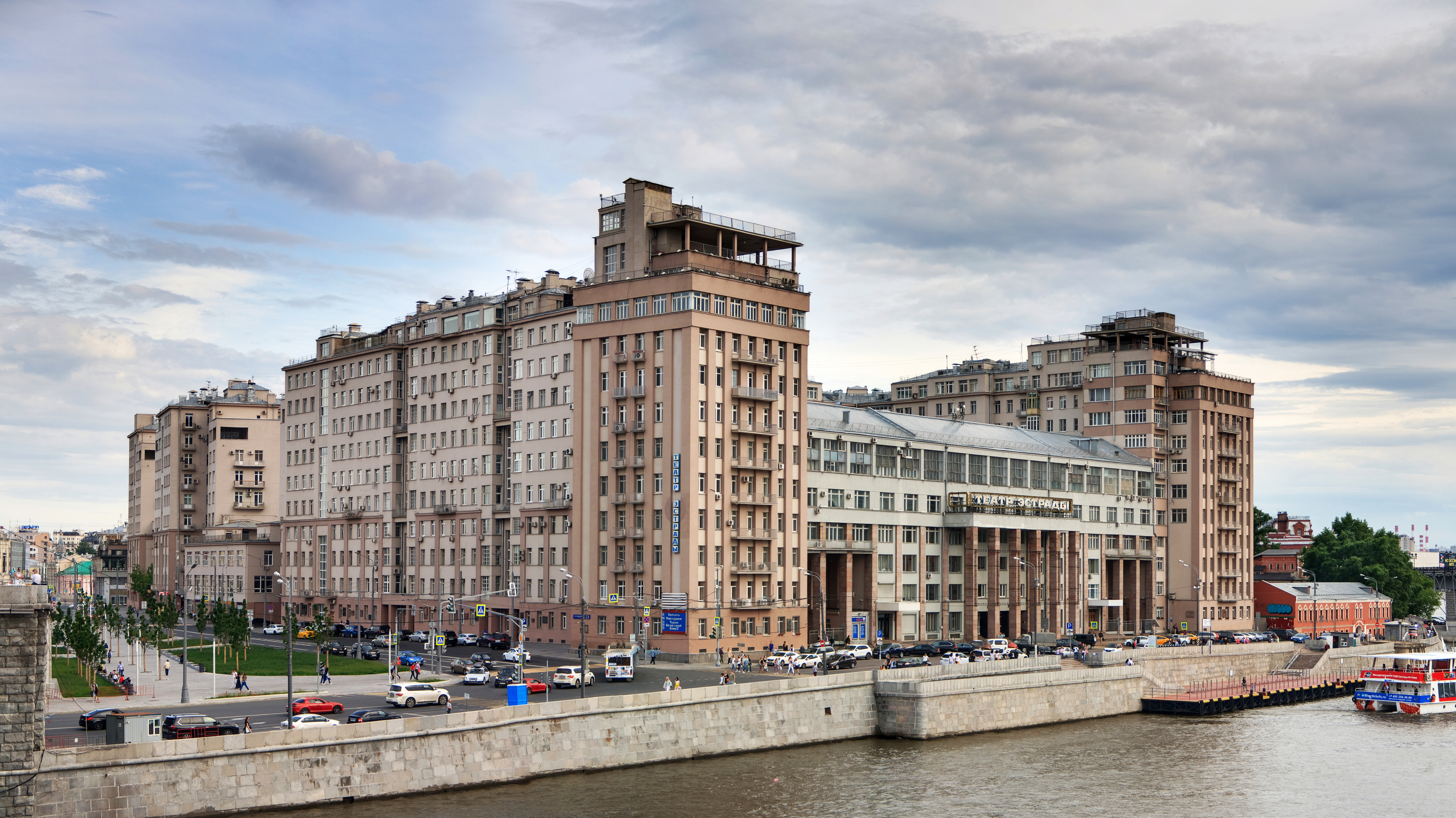
- Interactive map of the: House on Embankment; Дом на набережной; area

General information
- Type: Residential
- Architectural style: Constructivism
- Location: 2, Serafimovicha Street, Moscow, Russia
- Construction started: 1928
- Completed: 1931
- Client: Soviet government

Height
- Height: ~50 m

Technical details
- Floor count: 12

Design and construction
- Architect: Boris Iofan

The House on the Embankment (Russian: Дом на набережной) is a block-wide apartment building on the banks of the Moskva River on Balchug in downtown Moscow, Russia. It faces Bersenevskaya Embankment on one side and Serafimovicha Street on the other side. Until 1952, it was the tallest residential building in Moscow. It is considered an example of constructivist architecture. It was best known as the place of residence of the Soviet elite, many of whom were arrested and executed during Stalin's Great Purge.

== Location ==
This residential complex of 505 apartments and 25 entrances is located on Zamoskvorechye Island, a district connected with the rest of the city by two bridges: Bolshoy Kamenny Bridge and Maly Kamenny Bridge. The ensemble covers an area of 3.3 hectares and comprises 8 buildings with a varying height of 9 to 11 floors. It overlooks Serafimovich Street and Bersenevskaya Embankment.

The official address of the building is 2 Serafimovich street. Organizations located on the riverside sometimes use the address 20 Bersenevskaya Embankment.

== History ==
The relocation of the capital from St. Petersburg to Moscow caused an increased need to house civil servants in Moscow. In 1927, a commission decided that a building would be constructed in the Bersenevka neighborhood, opposite the Kremlin, which had been occupied by the Wine and Salt Court, an old distillery and excise warehouse. During the Tsarist era, the area had been used mainly as a mushroom market.

The new apartment block was completed in 1931 as the Government Building, a residence for the Soviet elite. Previously, they had lived mostly in the Kremlin itself or in various luxury hotels around Moscow, such as the National, the Metropol and the Loskutnaya.

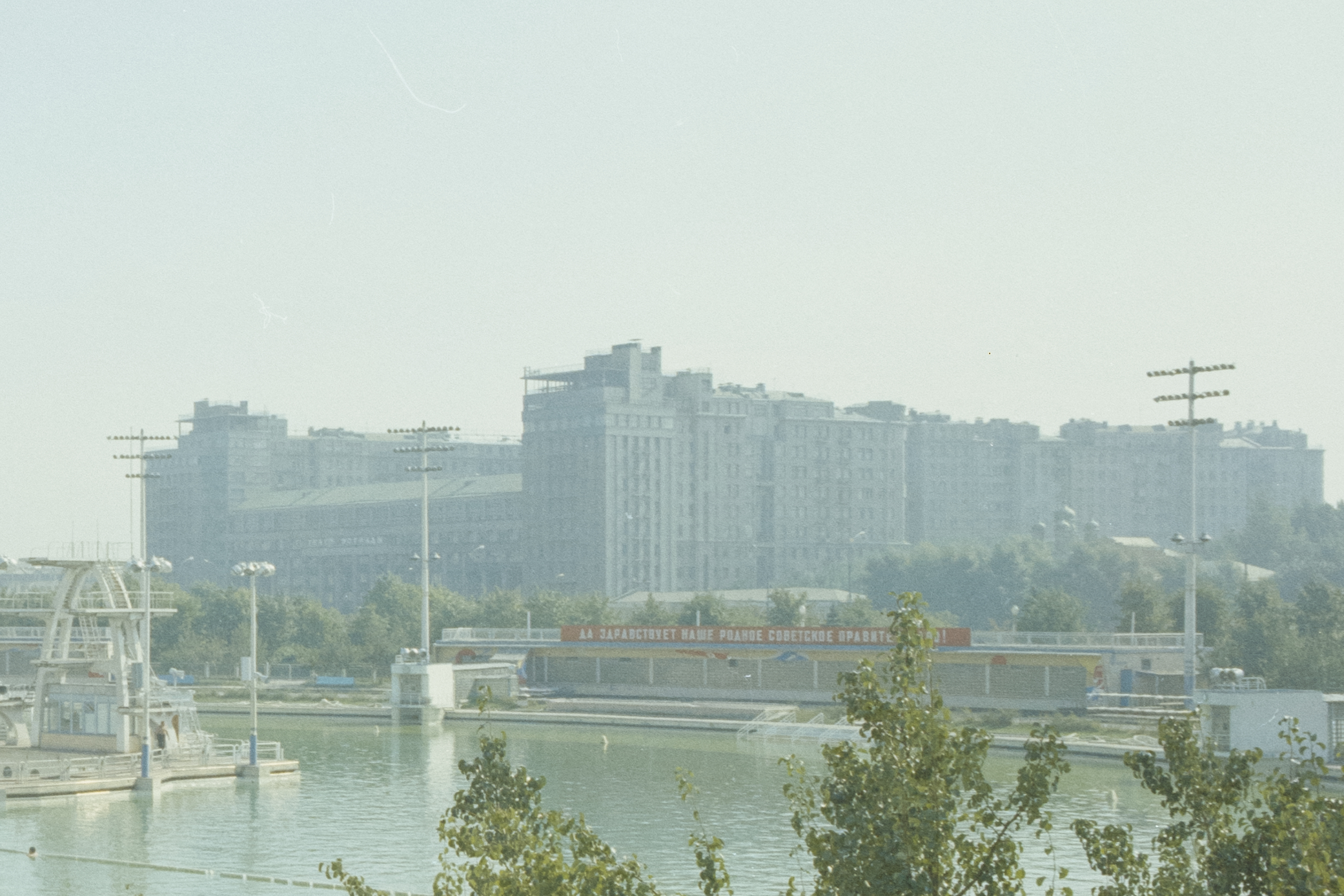
View from Moskva pool, 1967

It was designed by Boris Iofan, who lived in the building from 1931 to 1976. (He also designed the Palace of the Soviets, which was never built.)

The building is considered to be constructivist in style. The apartments were luxurious for their time: telephones, central heating and high ceilings were standard. At the time, most Muskovites had to make do with communal apartments. The building also featured a sports hall, tennis court, kindergarten, library, laundrette and a kitchen from which meals could be ordered for collection.

Many residents and their families were detained during the Great Purge under reign of Stalin in the late 1930s; to the extent that the building was dryly referred to as "The House of Preliminary Detention". (That is a play on the Russian initialism Допр, from the building's original name: Дом прави́тельства). During this period it was known as having the highest rate of per-capita arrests and executions of any residential building in Moscow. Fully a third of its residents disappeared during the purge. Professor Yuri Slezkine published in 2017 The House of Government: A Saga of the Russian Revolution (Princeton University Press) which records the fates of about eighty tenants and their families. He notes that some of the apartments in the Government Building held up to five successive sets of occupants between 1937 and 1940, as senior officials were arrested for execution or imprisonment.

== Present day ==
The building has 505 apartments (some used as offices), a theater, a movie theater, restaurants, retail stores and an Azbuka Vkusa supermarket, not dissimilar to the situation when it was originally built. Although other areas of the city have much more luxurious apartments, the apartments in the House on the Embankment are still sought after and very expensive because of their location and the prestige associated with the building. Apart from the descendants of the former Soviet elite, the building is also home to pop stars, film producers, cultural figures and expats. A small museum was opened in 1989 on the first floor of the building, containing exhibits about its history, as well as providing a more general social history of the 1930s and 1940s. There are 25 memorial plaques on the facade of the building. From 2001 to 2011 an 8-metre high Mercedes-Benz logo was placed on the roof (as advertising).

== The House on the Embankment Museum ==
In the 1980s, an initiative group arose among residents to create the House on the Embankment museum. The museum was opened in 1989 in the former flat of the guard of the first entrance. The first director of the museum was Tamara Ter-Yegiazaryan, who had lived in the house since 1931. The exhibition was enriched with personal belongings, books, photographs, and documents from the GARF, RGASPI and other archives. The everyday circumstances of the 1930s were recreated, lists of tenants, victims of Stalinist repressions and participants of the Second World War were also made.

In 1992, the House on the Embankment gained the status of a state museum. In 1998, by a resolution of the Moscow Government, it was given the status of a municipal museum of local history, and Olga Trifonova, the widow of the writer Yury Trifonov, became its director. Also in the mid-1990s, memorial plaques to the residents of the house began to be installed.

In 2014, the museum House on the Embankment became a department of the museum association "Museums of Moscow", and from 2016 it became part of the State Museum of the History of the Gulag.

== In popular culture ==
- The "House on the Embankment" name became commonly used following the publication of a novel of that name by a former resident Yuri Trifonov. It was written in 1975 and published in 1976.
- The first and last scenes in the film Burnt by the Sun are set in the building.
- The building has been entered in the city's cultural heritage register.

== Notable past residents ==
- Vladimir Adoratsky
- Grigori Aleksandrov
- Svetlana Alliluyeva (as mentioned in Stalin's Daughter by Rosemary Sullivan)
- Aleksandr Arosev
- Hovhannes (Ivan) Bagramyan
- Matvei Berman
- Nikolai Bukharin
- Nikolai Demchenko
- Georgi Dimitrov
- Robert Eikhe
- Yakov Hanecki
- Filipp Goloshchekin
- Anatoli Granovsky
- Ivan Gronsky
- Boris Iofan
- Boris Ivanov
- Nikolai Kamanin
- Platon Kerzhentsev
- Artemii Khalatov
- Nikita Khrushchev
- Mikhail Koltsov
- Feliks Kon
- Ivan Konev
- Alexei Kosygin
- Karl Lander
- Anna Larina
- Kiril Meretskov
- Artem Mikoyan
- Sergei Mironov
- Mikhail Shatrov
- Pavel Postyshev
- Valentin Trifonov
- Yuri Trifonov
- Mikhail Tukhachevsky
- Mikhail Vodopianov
- Georgy Zhukov

== Memorial plates ==
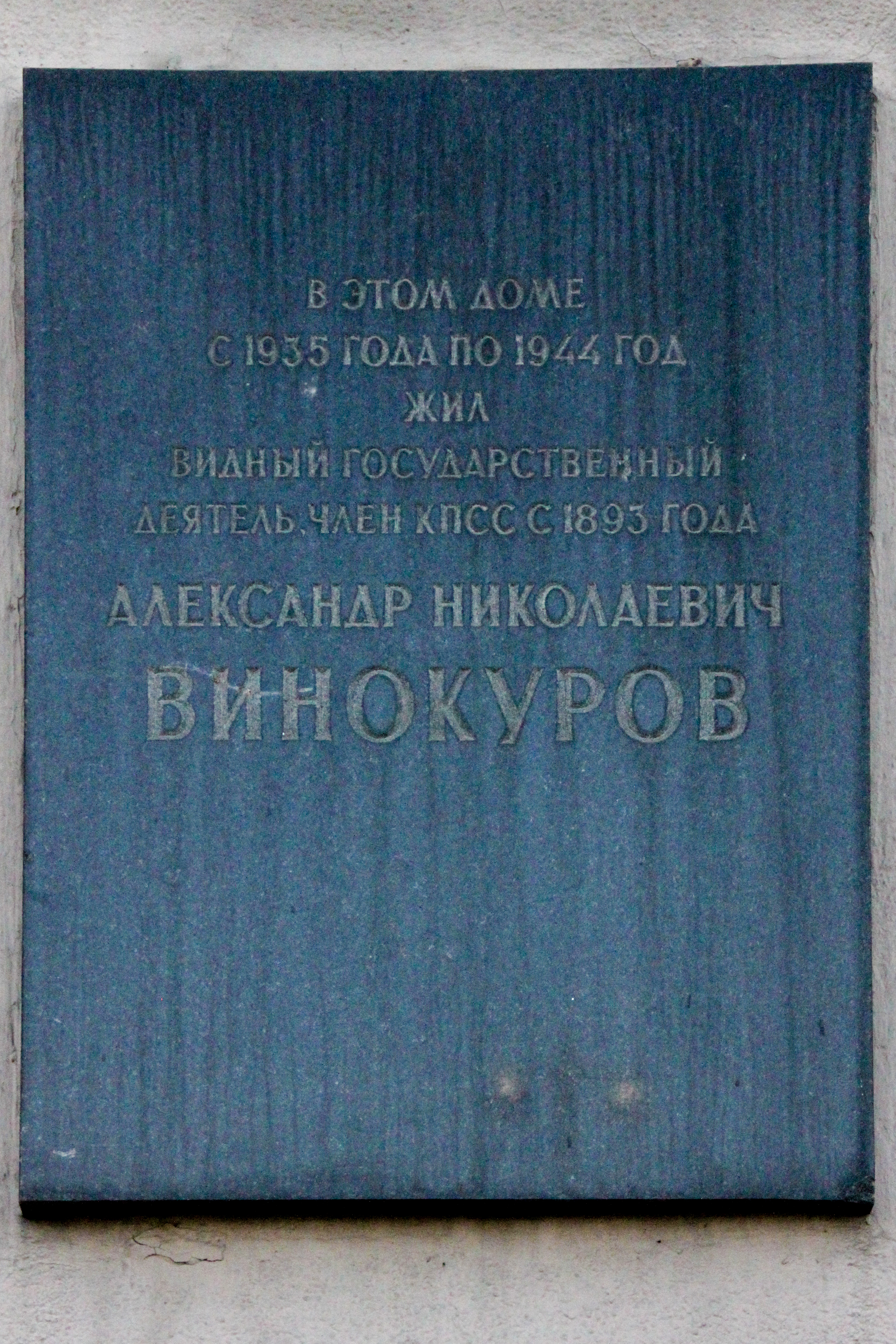
Alexander Vinokourov

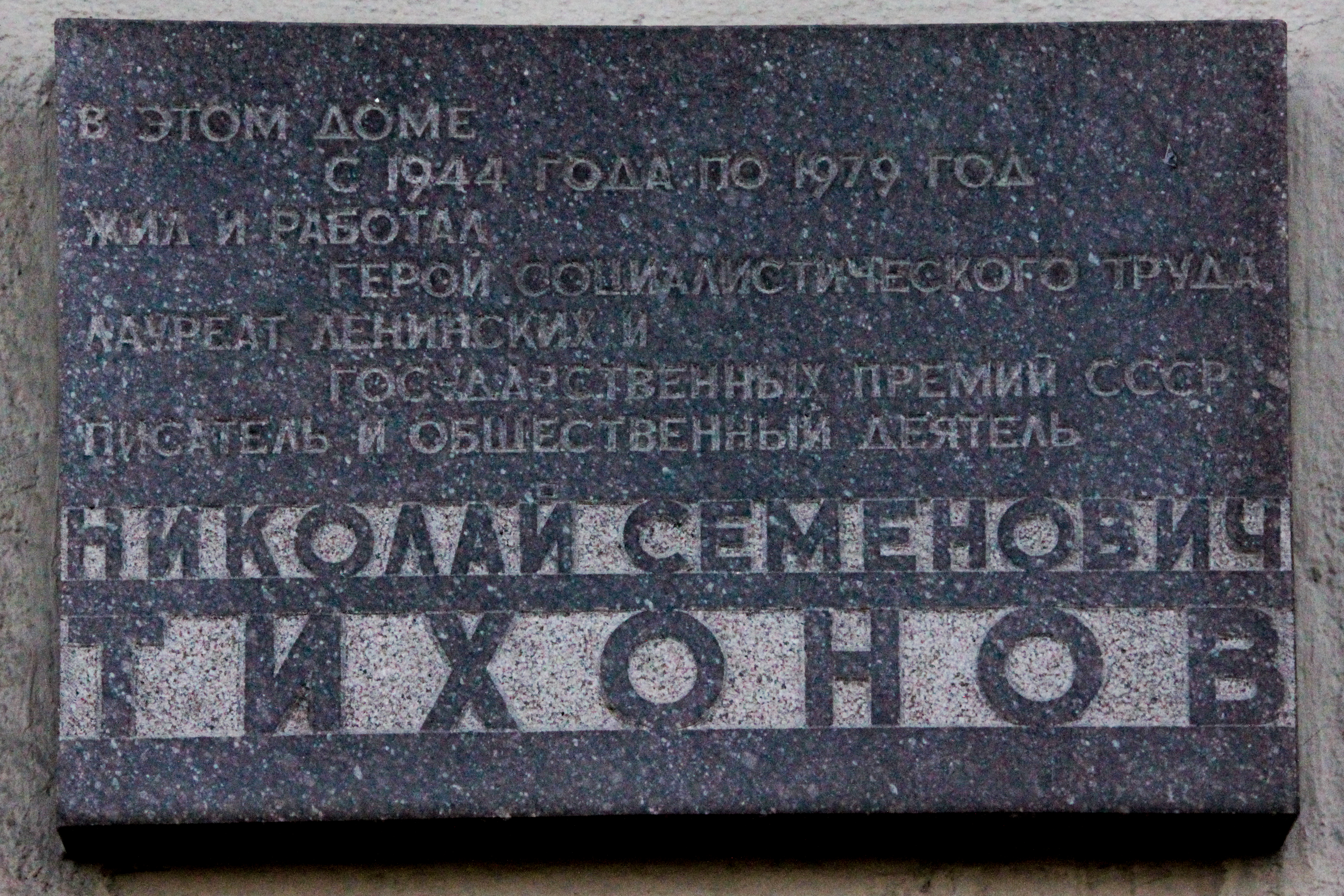
Nikolai Tikhonov

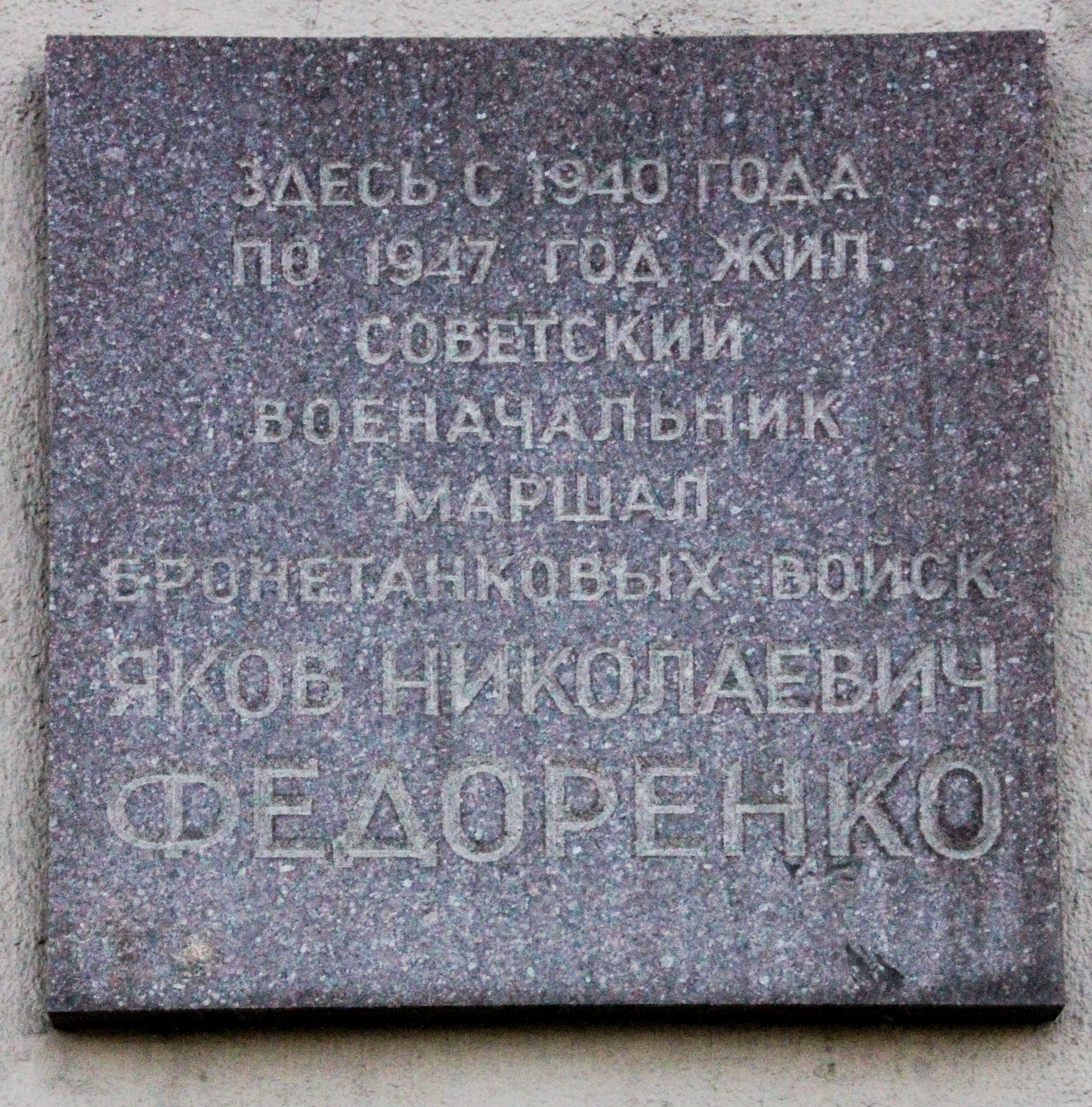
Yakov Fedorenko

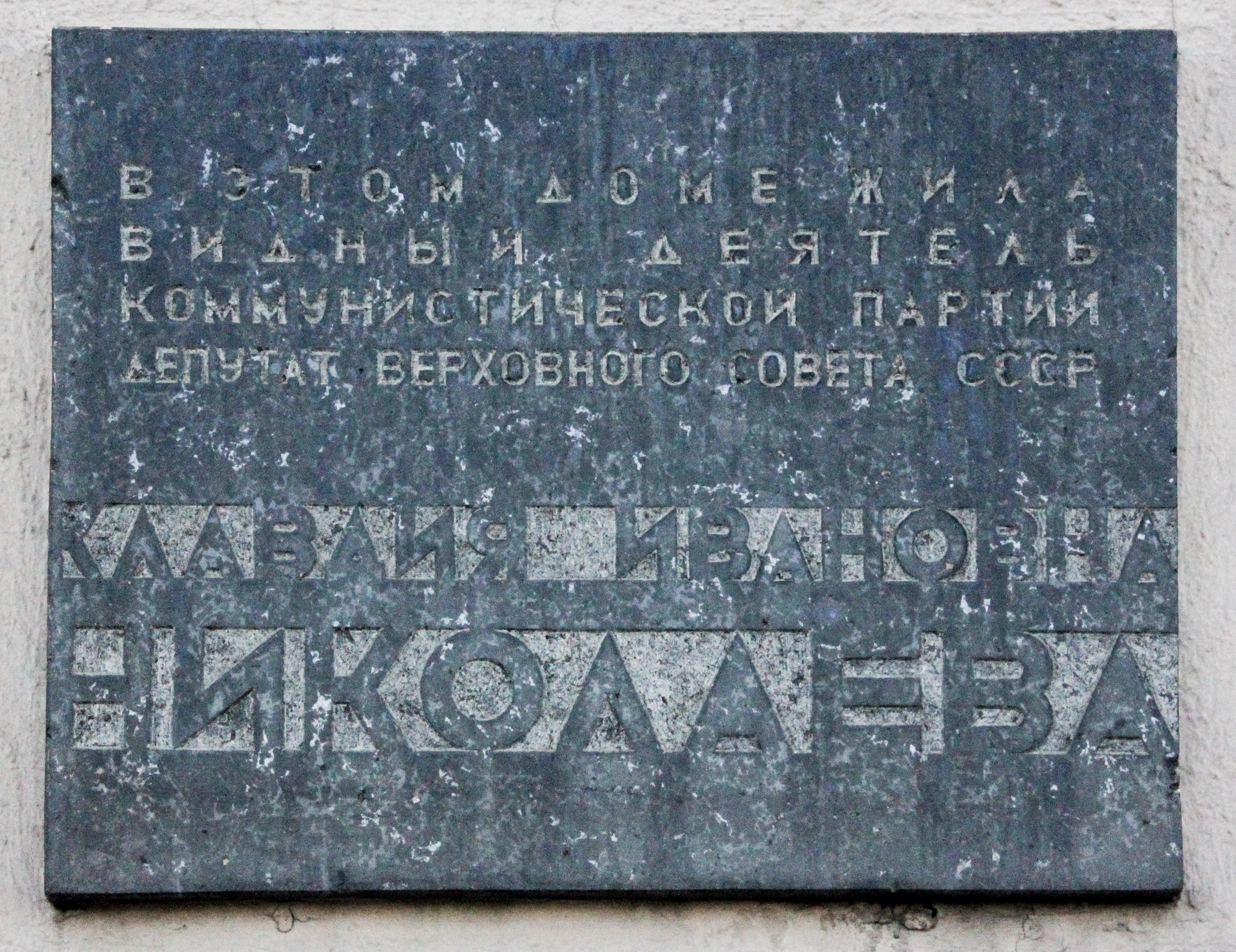
Klavdiya Nikolaeva

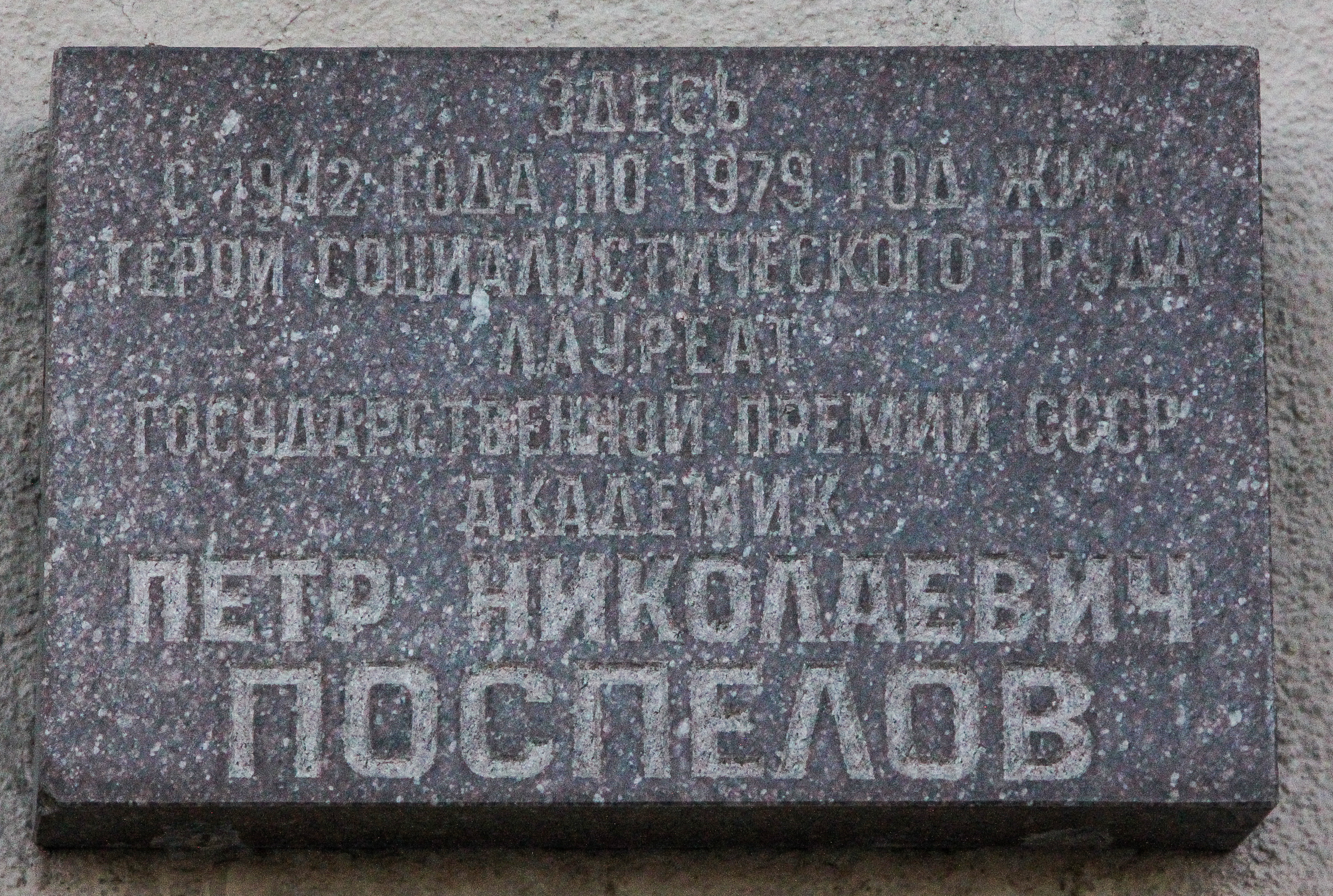
Pyotr Pospelov

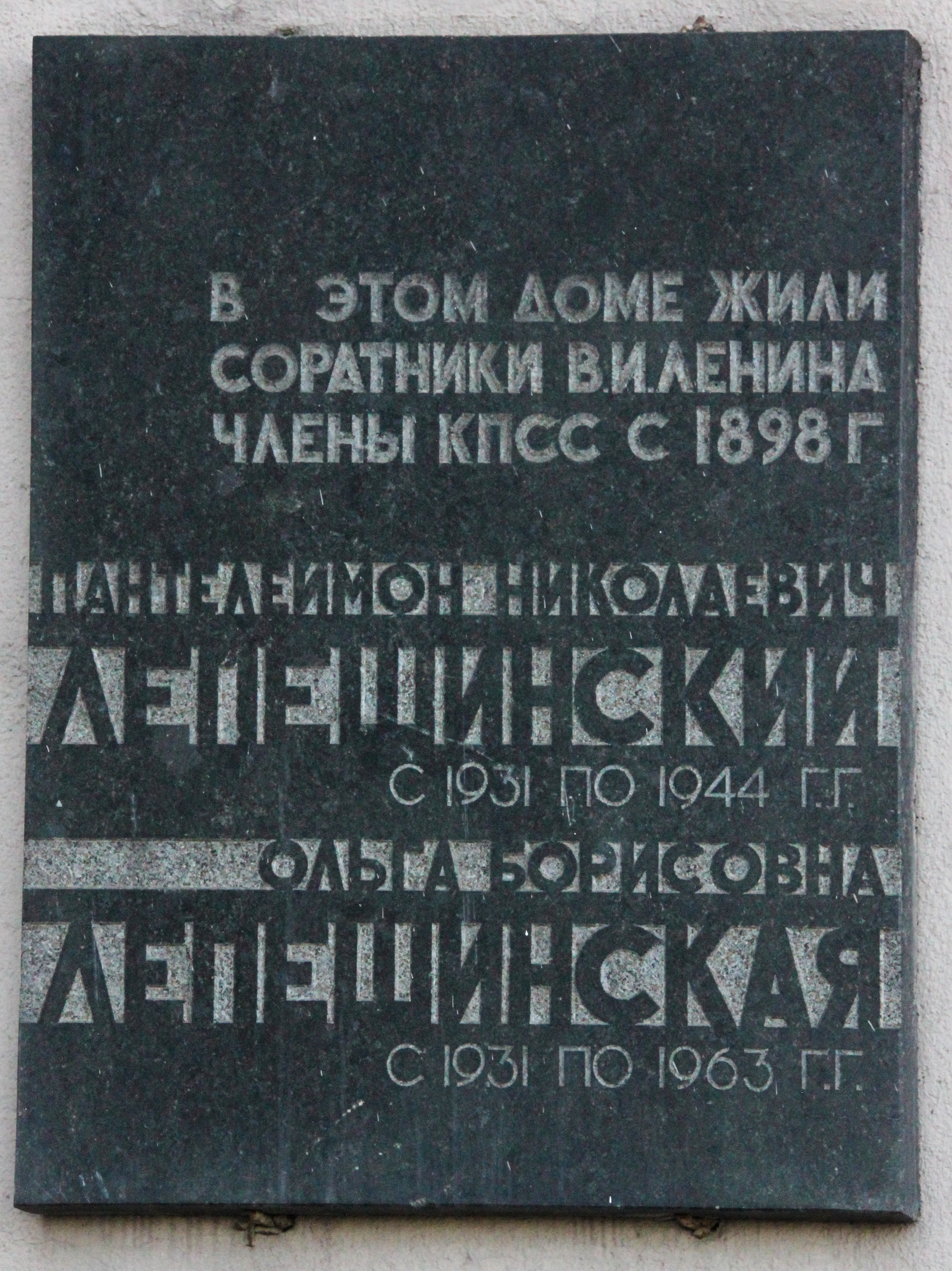
Panteleimon Lepeshinskiy and Olga Lepeshinskaia

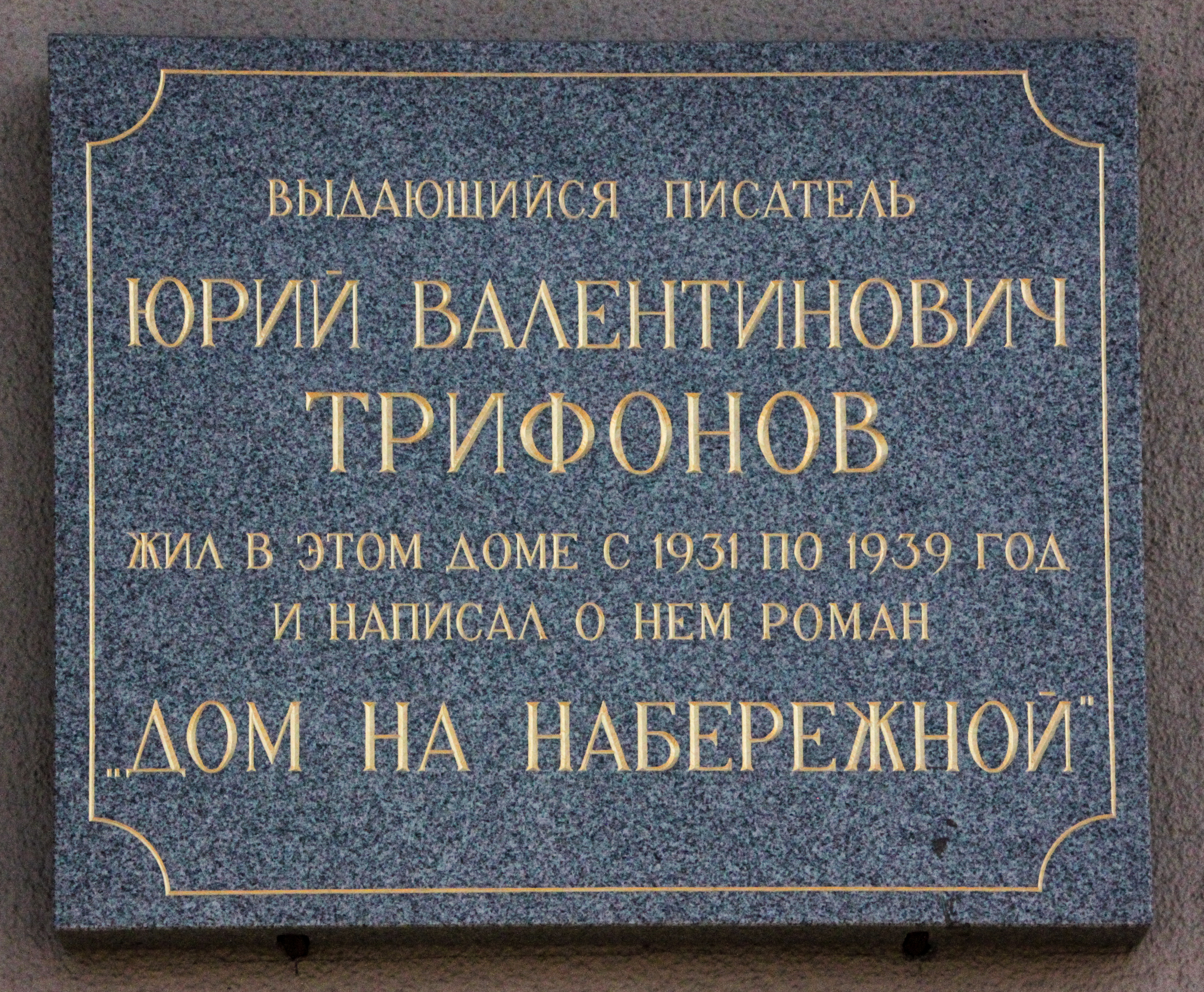
Yury Trifonov

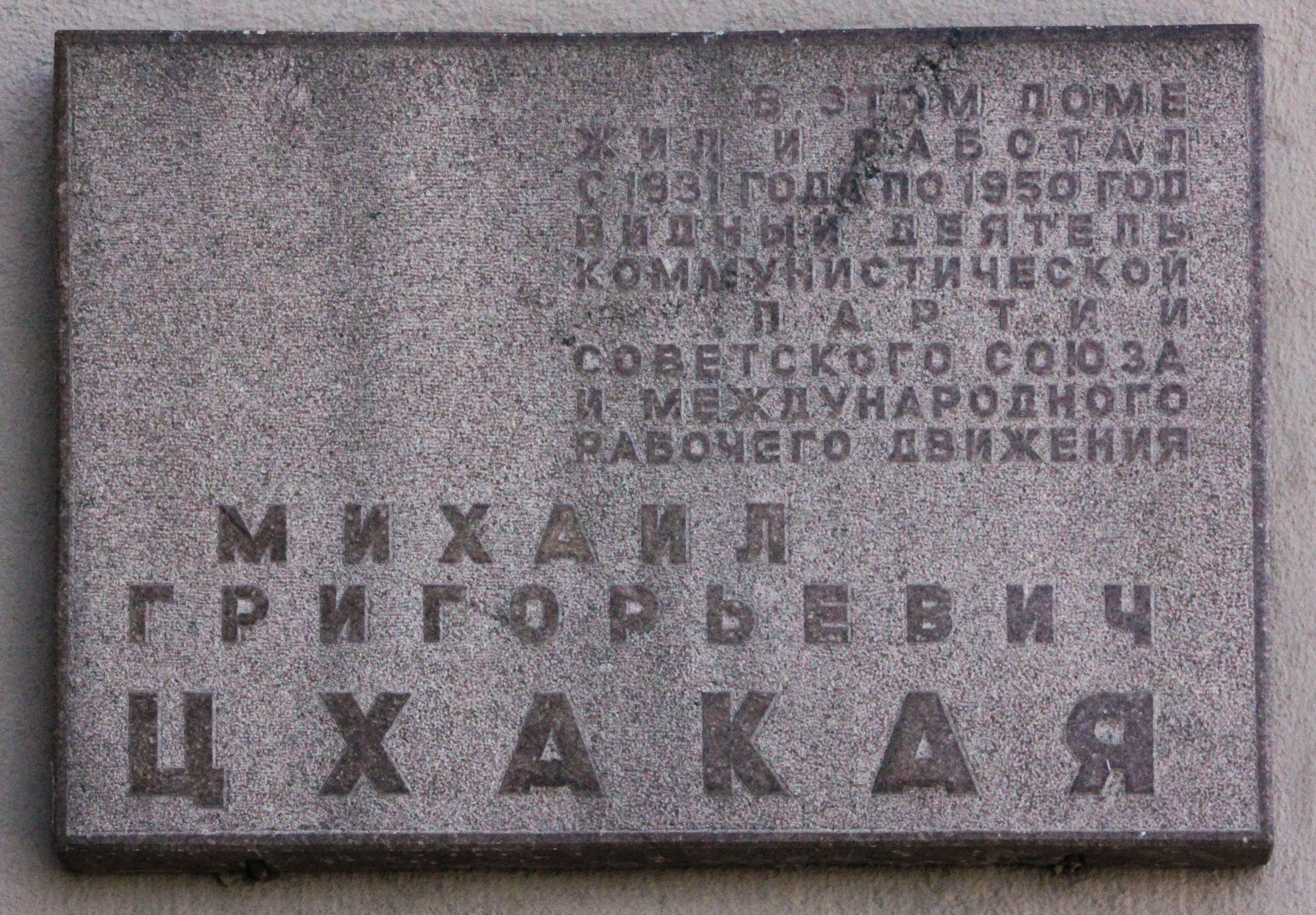
Mikhail Tskhakaya

== Bibliography ==
- Slezkine, Yuri (2017). The House of Government. Princeton. ISBN 9780691176949.

== See also ==
- Slovo Building (Kharkiv)
