= The Long Goodbye =

The Long Goodbye may refer to:

== Books ==
=== English ===
- The Long Goodbye (play), a 1940 one-act play by Tennessee Williams
- The Long Goodbye (novel), a 1953 novel by Raymond Chandler
- The Long Goodbye: A Memoir, a 2011 book by Meghan O'Rourke

=== Russian ===
- The Long Goodbye, a 1971 novel by Yury Trifonov

== Films ==
- The Long Goodbye (film), a 1973 film by Robert Altman, adapted from the Raymond Chandler novel (see above)
- Long Goodbye (film) or The Head Hunter, a 1982 Hong Kong film by Shing Hon Lau

== Music ==
- The Long Goodbye (band), an American band featuring Michael Cera
- The Long Goodbye (Riz Ahmed album), 2020
- The Long Goodbye (Candlebox album), 2023
- The Long Goodbye (The Essex Green album), 2003
- The Long Goodbye (Procol Harum album), 1995
- Long Goodbye: A Tribute to Don Pullen, a 1998 album by David Murray
- The Long Goodbye, an album by John Paul White, 2008
- "The Long Goodbye" (song), originally recorded by co-writer Paul Brady, also covered by Brooks & Dunn and by co-writer Ronan Keating
- "Long Goodbye" (song), a 1987 song by the Thompson Twins
- "The Long Goodbye", a song by Gary Brooker
- "The Long Goodbye", a composition by John Williams and Johnny Mercer, for the 1973 film
- "The Long Goodbye", a song by Bruce Springsteen from Human Touch
- The Long Goodbye: LCD Soundsystem Live at Madison Square Garden, 2014
- The Long Goodbye Tour, a concert tour by Deep Purple

== Television episodes ==
- "The Long Goodbye" (Beverly Hills, 90210)
- "The Long Goodbye" (Casualty)
- "The Long Goodbye" (Climax!), 1954 television adaptation of the 1953 novel by Raymond Chandler
- "The Long Goodbye" (Dallas)
- "The Long Goodbye" (Dawson's Creek)
- "The Long Goodbye" (Duet)
- "The Long Goodbye" (Flying Blind)
- "The Long Goodbye" (Full House)
- "The Long Goodbye" (Growing Pains)
- "The Long Goodbye" (McLeod's Daughters)
- "The Long Goodbye" (The Persuaders!)
- "The Long Goodbye" (The Rifleman)
- "The Long Goodbye" (Stargate Atlantis)
- "The Long Goodbye" (The Torkelsons)
- "The Long Goodbye" (The West Wing)

== See also ==
- Long Farewell, a 2004 Russian drama film
- The Long Farewell, a Soviet film drama
- The Long Kiss Goodnight, a 1996 American spy action thriller film
