= Yuri Davydov =

Soviet writer (1924–2002)

Yuri Vladimirovich Davydov (Юрий Владимирович Давыдов; November 20, 1924, Moscow – January 17, 2002, Moscow) was a Russian historical novelist. He has been acclaimed in Russia for his works on the pre-revolutionary underground movement, notably on People's Will. Each of his books was preceded by his own meticulous research, including extensive archival work.

== Biography ==
During the Great Patriotic War, he served in combat with the Northern Fleet. From 1944 to 1949 he studied history by correspondence at Moscow State University. In 1949 he was arrested and sentenced to seven years’ imprisonment on charges of “anti-Soviet agitation.” In 1950 he was transferred from Butyrka Prison to the Vyatlag (a branch of the GULAG). Released early in 1954, he was fully rehabilitated in 1957. From the late 1940s onward, Davydov wrote largely biographical, often documentary-based books about Russian naval commanders and explorers.

In the 1960s, Davydov's focus shifted toward the themes of Dostoevsky’s Demons: the moral and ideological degeneration of the revolutionary movement. In his novels The Dead Season of Falling Leaves (1968) and The Straw-Roofed Hut (1986), drawing on little-known archival documents and sensational criminal plots, Davydov explored the rise of police provocation, and the tangled, shifting relations between police and revolutionaries in post-reform Russia. These two novels — central to his oeuvre — feature rich psychological portraits of the famous agents provocateur, Sergey Degayev and Evno Azef.

The Straw-Roofed Hut was originally published in 1982 under the title Two Sheaves of Letters and, in its expanded version, was awarded the USSR State Prize. The novel revolves around German Lopatin and, apparently, originated from conversations between Davydov and Yuri Trifonov, who collected materials for a novel about Lopatin (in the vein of The Impatient Ones, 1973). According to Deming Brown, of the University of Michigan:

The novel portrays revolutionary activities ranging from St. Petersburg to the provinces, to émigré colonies in Western Europe, and to Siberia. Both idealists and cynics, upright fighters and predatory intriguers are displayed. Davydov takes pains to show how the revolutionary movement could breed and encompass such polar opposites -- could promote democracy on the one hand and dictatorship on the other.

In the 1990s Davydov worked on a long novel about Vladimir Burtsev, Bestseller. His later prose is marked by the presence of the author as a character, elements of play and fantasy, and insertions of verse. His final novel, The Crowned Valkyrie, was based on the life of Dagmar of Denmark. None of his novels have been translated into English.
