= Aaron Soltz =

Soviet politician and lawyer

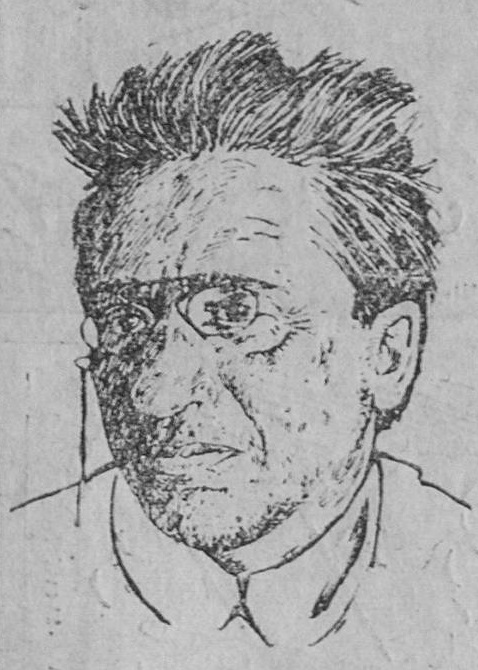
Portrait of Aron Soltz

Aaron Aleksandrovich Soltz (Russian: Аарон Александрович Сольц; 10 March 1872 – 30 April 1945) was an Old Bolshevik and a Soviet politician and lawyer. He was informally known as the "conscience of the Party". While partially responsible for the Soviet repressions he was one of very few high-ranking Joseph Stalin loyalists who openly objected to the Great Purge; he died in a psychiatric clinic after years of involuntary commitment.

== Biography ==
Soltz was born in Soleniki (now Šalčininkai) to a Jewish merchant family of Lithuania. He studied at the Law School of Saint Petersburg University then became involved in revolutionary work. As a Jew living in Russia during a time of widespread anti-semitism, Soltz believed that his Jewishness, his outsider status drew him towards revolutionary thought. He was a member of Russian Social Democratic Labour Party from 1898, and was involved in the organization of underground printing and publishing of illegal literature. Soltz participated in all three Russian revolutions, and was many times jailed and exiled. Many times he also escaped from his exile. When exiled to Turukhansk Soltz shared the same house and reportedly the same bed with Joseph Stalin.

In 1917 Soltz was a member of Moscow Committee of the Bolshevik Party, an editor of Social Democrat and Pravda newspapers. When the Central Control Committee of the Bolshevik Party was established in November 1920, Soltz was one of its three members, and from March 1921, when it was expanded to seven members, he was its de facto chairman, remaining a member until 1934. From 1924, he was also a member of the executive of Comintern. Beginning in 1921 he was a Judge of the Supreme Court of Soviet Russia and from 1923 he was a Judge of the Supreme Court of the Soviet Union. During the Shakhty Trial, he called for the death sentence for all the defendants, and he was one of the prosecutors at the Menshevik Trial. From 1935 Aaron Soltz served as a Deputy Prosecutor General of the USSR, and was later the Chairman of the Judicial Collegium of the Supreme Court of the Soviet Union. (председатель юридической коллегии Верховного Суда).

Soltz was considered to be the expert on communist party ethics. He wrote that:

Correct, ethical and good is whatever helps us reach our goal, smash our class enemies, and learn to organise our economic life according to socialist principles. Incorrect, unethical, and inadmissable is whatever harms this. This is the point of view we must adopt when we try to determine whether a certain action by a Party member is ethical or not.

He appears not to have grasped the implications of Stalin's rise to power in the 1920s. seemingly thinking that Stalin was still subject to party control. In 1929, he was speaking at a party meeting when someone in the audience demanded to know why Lenin's Testament, which had called for Stalin to be removed from the post of General Secretary, had not carried out. Soltz is reported to have replied: "The party is putting Stalin to the test. If he works well, he will remain general secretary; if not, he'll be removed."

In October 1937, during the Great Purge, Soltz was outraged when his friend Valentin Trifonov was arrested, and shouted at the Prosecutor General of the USSR Andrey Vyshinsky, who asserted that anyone arrested by the NKVD must be an enemy of the people. Addressing a conference of party activists in Sverdlovsk, he called for a special commission to be set up to investigate Vyshinsky. According to Trifonov's son, Yury:

Some of the audience froze with terror, but most began to shout: "Down with him! Get off the platform! A wolf in sheep's clothing!" Soltz kept on speaking. Some enraged vigilantes ran up to the old man and dragged him off the stand. It's hard to say why Stalin did not get even with Soltz the simple way, by arresting him."

He was suspended from his work in Procurator Office and tried to contact Stalin, but to no avail. In February 1938 Soltz started a hunger strike and was involuntarily hospitalized in a Moscow psychiatric clinic. There he declaimed that the Great Purge was the work of people who had never been Bolsheviks, such as Vyshinsky and Nikolai Yezhov "Who is Yezhov? Why should I believe Yezhov? The Party does not know Yezhov!" he told staff at the clinic. He was released from the clinic after six weeks, into the care of his niece, Anna, who was arrested two and a half months later. He held minor jobs until he retired in 1940. He died in 1945 and his ashes were placed at the Donskoye Cemetery in Moscow.

== Family ==
Soltz did not marry. He lived with his sister, Esfir, and later with her daughter, Anna, the ex-wife of Isaak Zelensky.

== Works ==
- Сольц А. Н. Ленин. К пятидесятилетнему юбилею. Пенза: Пенз. отделение Центропечати, 1920. - 22 с. 6000 экз.
- Сольц А. и Файнбит С. Революционная законность и наша карательная политика. М.: «Московский робочий», 1925.- 126 с.
