= The Impatient Ones =

1973 historical novel by Yuri Trifonov

The Impatient Ones (Russian: Нетерпение; literally: "Impatience") is a 1973 historical novel by Yuri Trifonov concerning the assassination of Alexander II of Russia in 1881 by a clandestine terrorist organization. Rooted in meticulous archival research and entirely devoid of invented characters, the book reads like a non-fiction novel. The author was nominated for the Nobel Prize by Heinrich Böll.

Driven by an agonizing "impatience" to forcefully accelerate history and free the peasantry (still oppressed after the insufficient reform of 1861), young idealists turned political terrorists — led by the charismatic Andrey Zhelyabov and Sophia Perovskaya — orchestrate a series of complex, highly clandestine assassination attempts, including train bombings and a massive explosion inside the Winter Palace. As the tsarist secret police close their dragnet, Zhelyabov is captured just prior to the final strike, forcing Perovskaya to take command of the fatal bomb attack on the Catherine Canal that would kill the Tsar.

Trifonov subverts conventional revolutionary myths by showing that the successful assassination failed to spark a popular uprising, instead plunging the country into a dark era of state reaction and dooming the deeply infatuated Zhelyabov and Perovskaya to the gallows. He views his protagonists as misdirected idealists whose bloody methods brought only further oppression.

Trifonov planned to write another novel about the revolutionary movement, this time focusing on German Lopatin, but his sudden death cut the project short. The narrative thread was later picked up by Trifonov's friend, Yuri Davydov, who expanded the idea into his 1982 novel Two Sheaves of Letters (which was subsequently revised and republished under the title The Straw-Roofed Hut).
