= List of supermarket chains in Russia =

This is a list of supermarket chains in Russia.

== Supermarkets ==
- Auchan
- Azbuka Vkusa (Russian: Азбука вкуса — Alphabet of Taste)
- Dixy
- Lenta (Russian: Лента — Belt) -419 supermarket, 255 supermarket
- Magnit (Russian: Магнит - 7,416 stores) 25315 all markets.
- METRO
- O'Key Group
  - Da! - 82 discounter stores
- Perekrestok (Russian: Перекрёсток — Crossroads)
- Pyaterochka (Russian: Пятёрочка)
- SPAR
- Svetofor
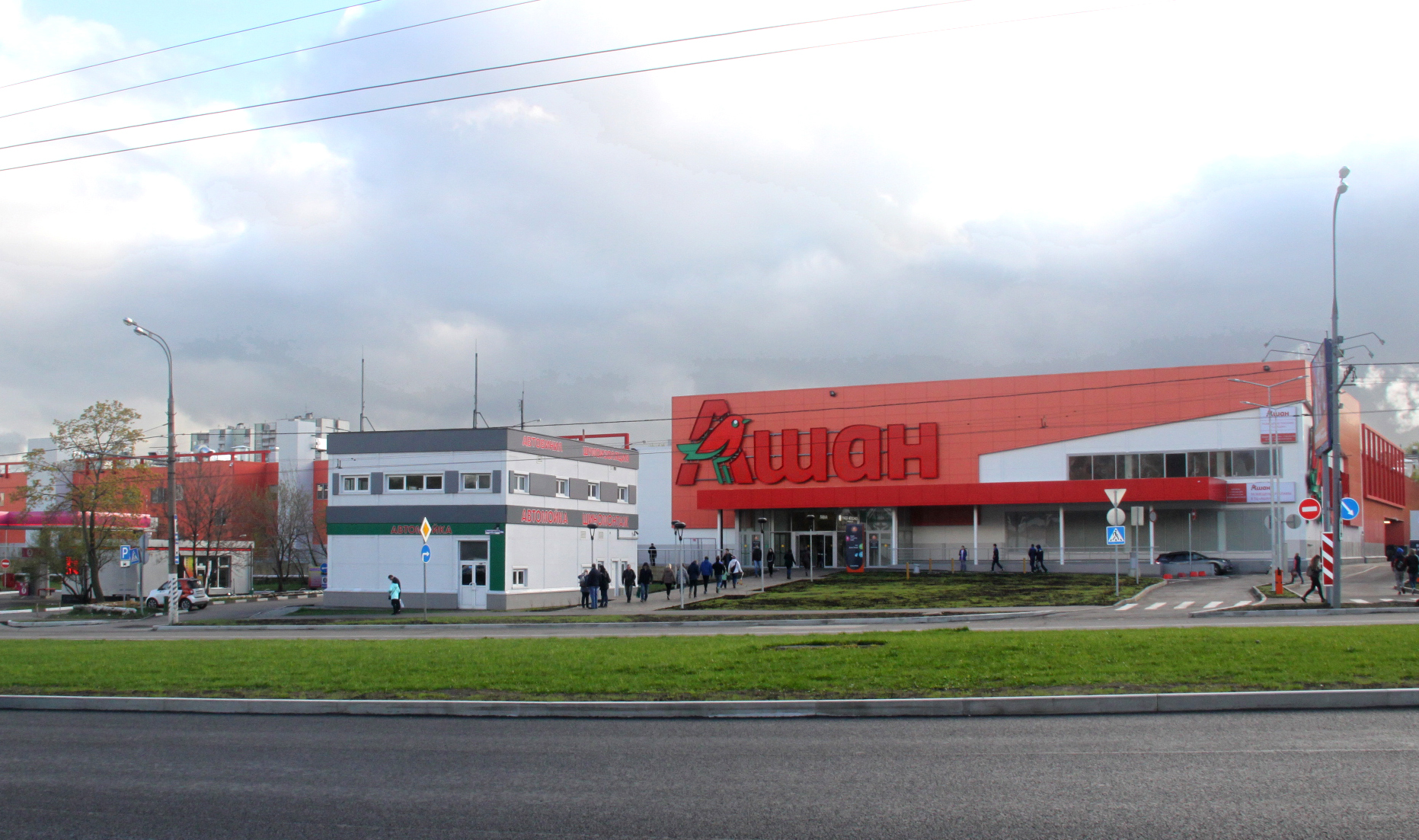
Auchan in Moscow

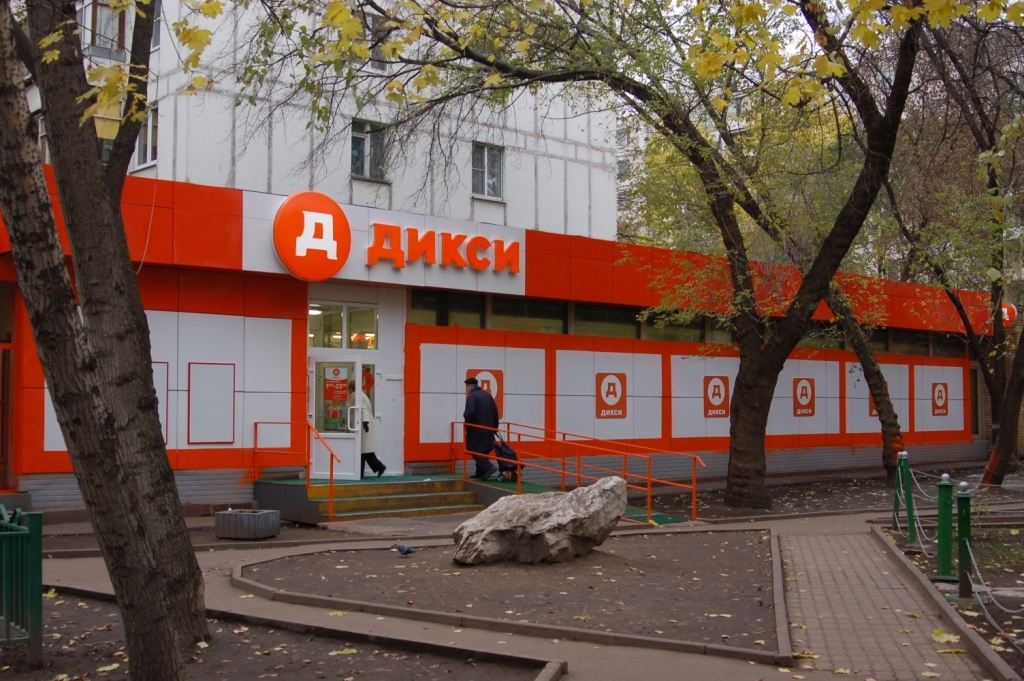
Dixy in Moscow

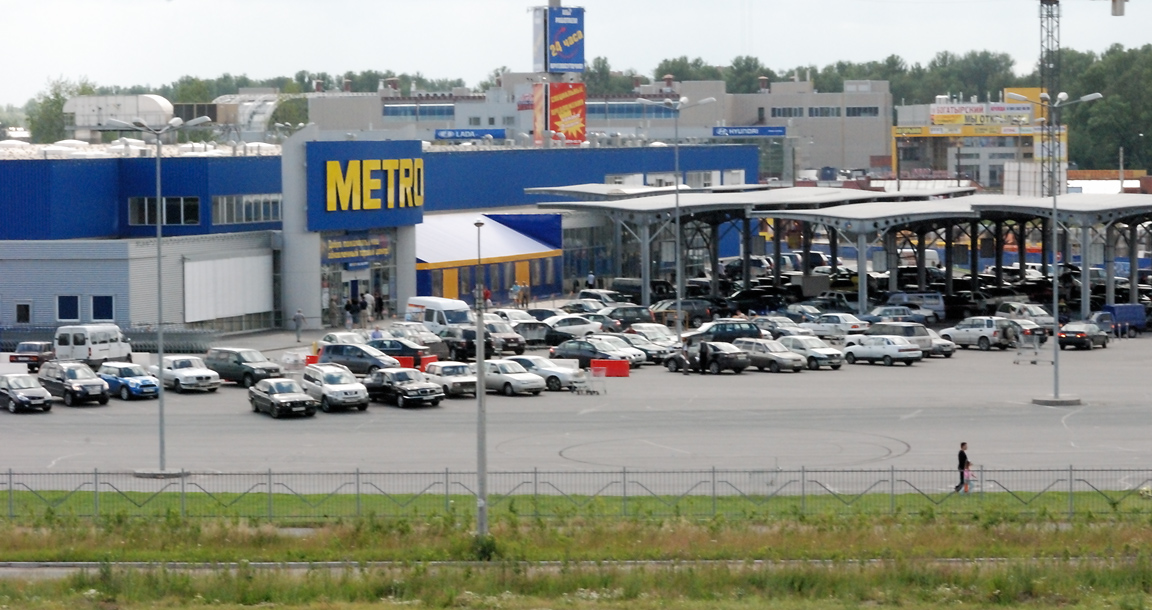
METRO in Saint-Petersburg

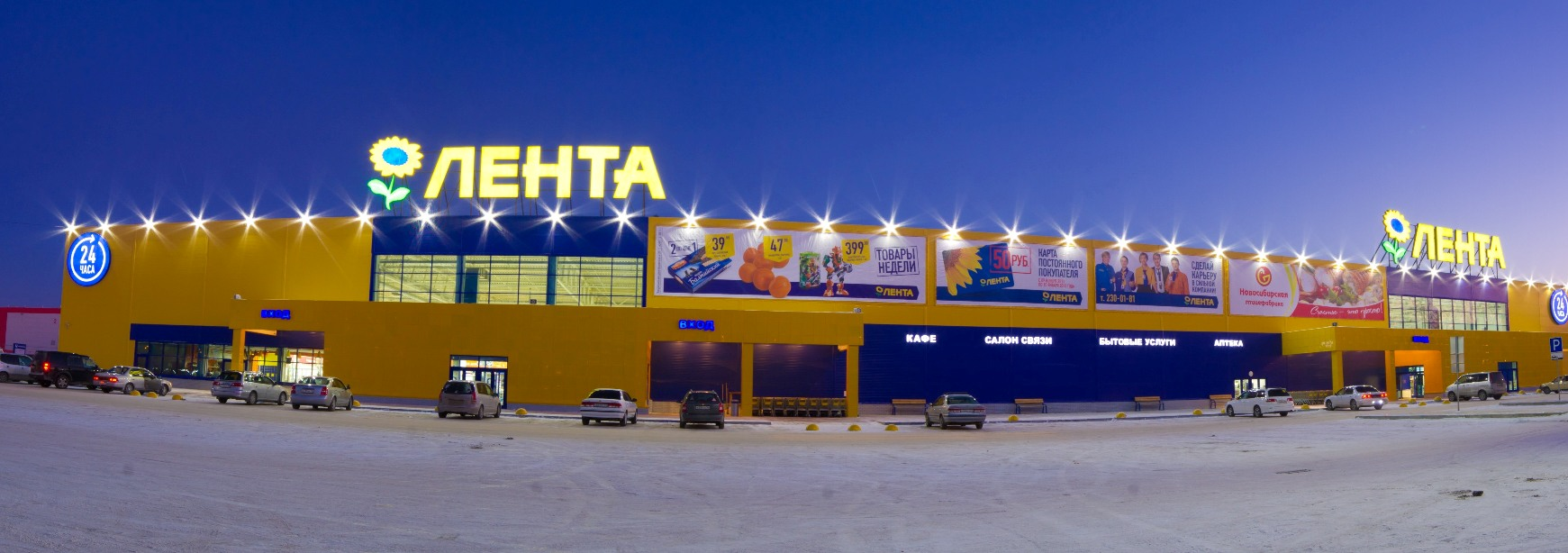
Lenta in Novosibirsk

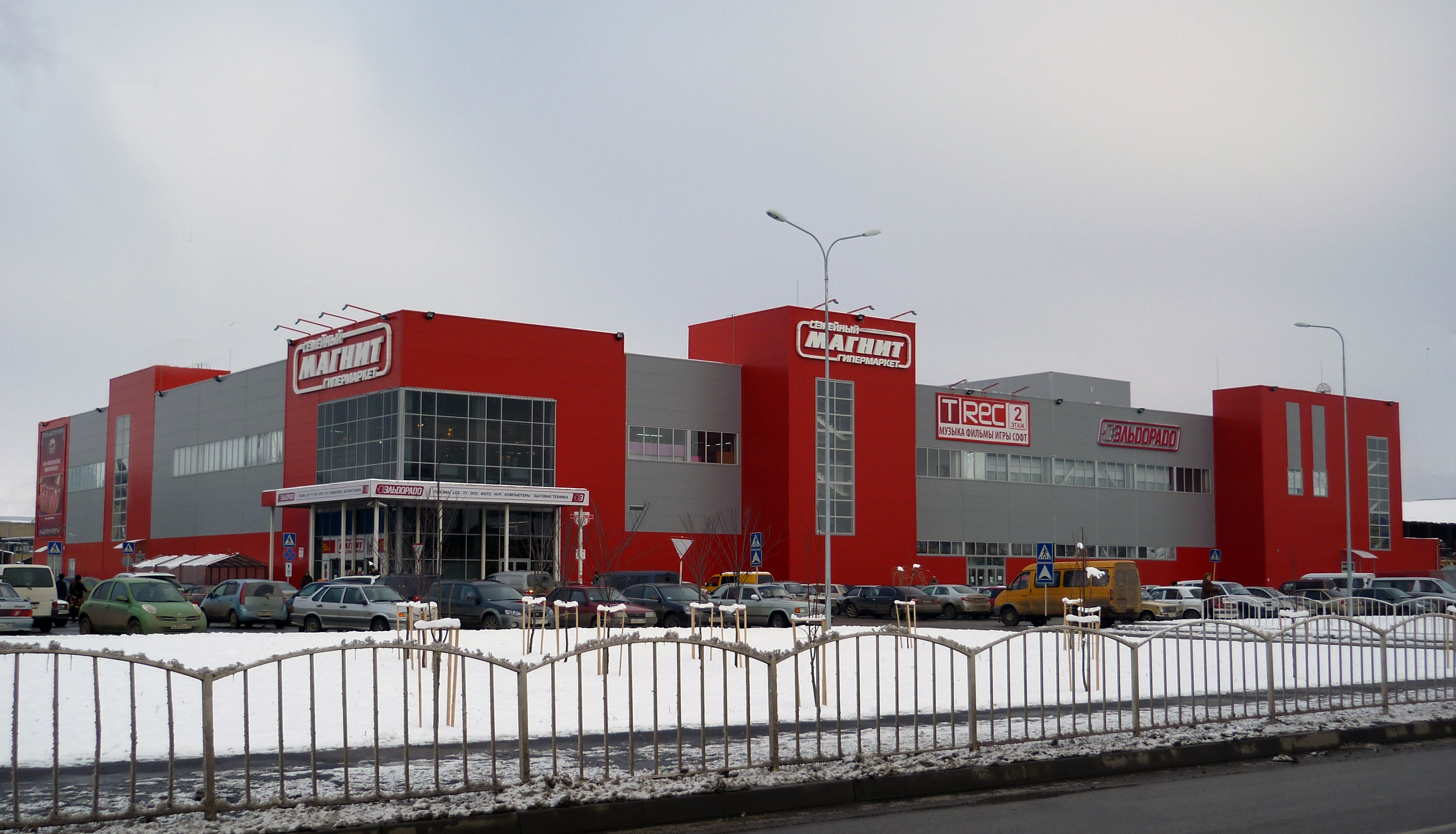
Magnit in Armavir, Krasnodar Krai

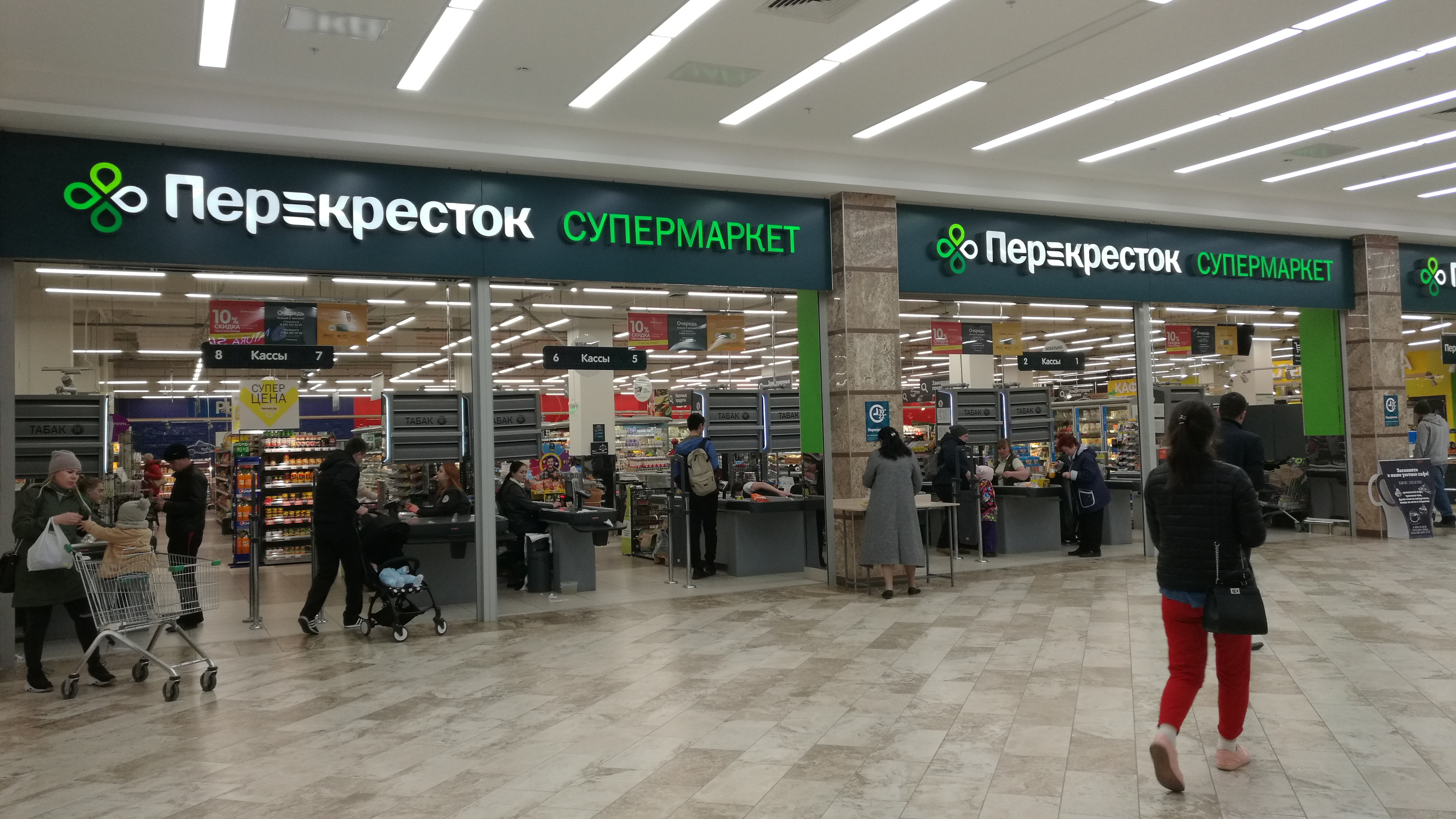
Perekryostok in Tyumen

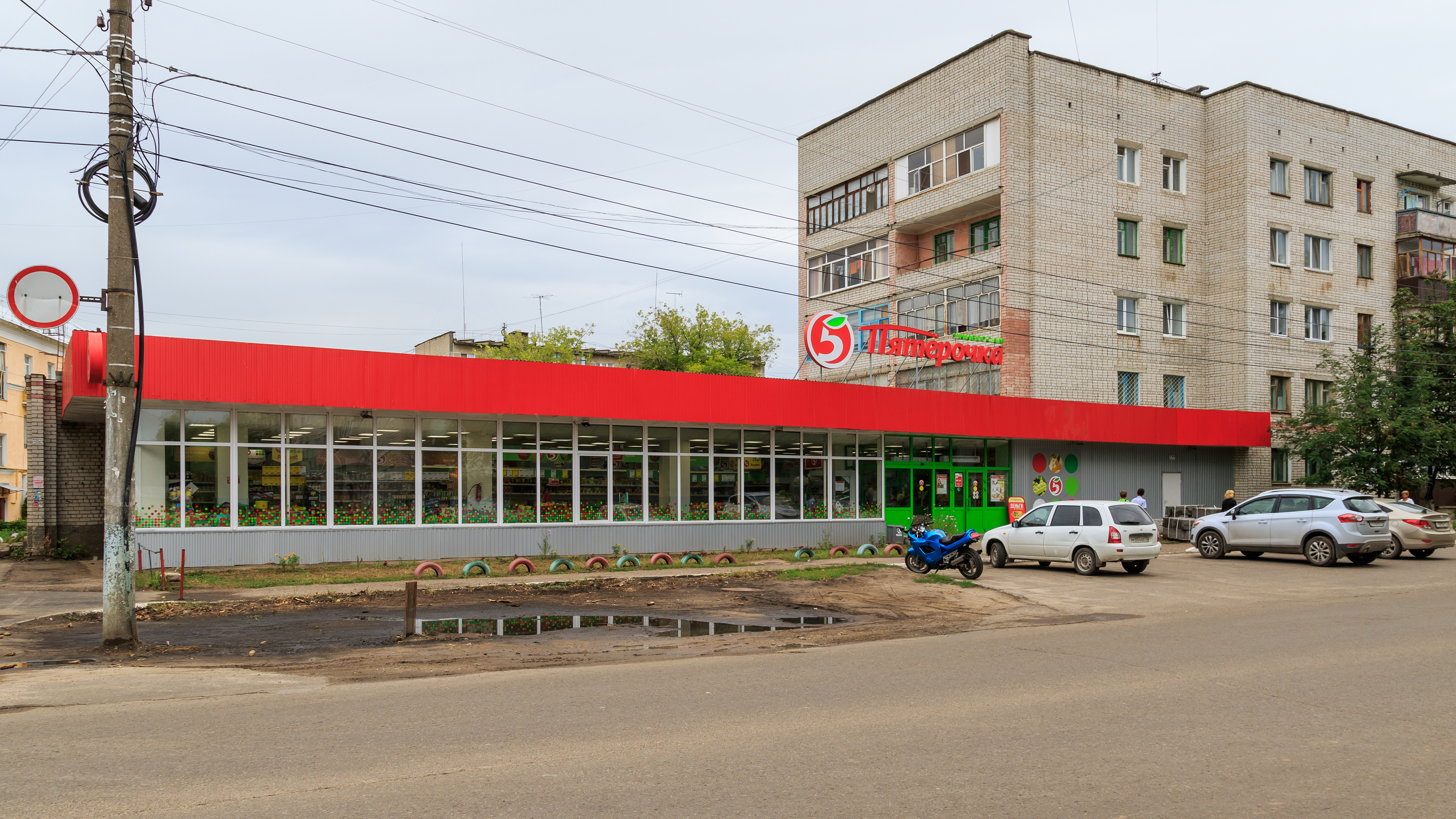
Pyaterochka in Volzhsk, Mari El

== Specialty chains ==
=== Jewellery retailers ===
| Name | Stores | Parent |
|---|---|---|
| Sunlight | 260 | |
| Edward Jones | 114 | Cyprus |
