= Disappearance (Trifonov novel) =

Disappearance is an unfinished, posthumously-published autobiographical novella of wartime childhood by Soviet writer Yury Trifonov who died in 1981. Trifonov started work on the novel in the 1960s, telling childhood stories against the background of the disappearances of his father in 1938 and other family and friends in the years 1937-1942, during the Second World War, and during Stalin's purges.
