= The House on the Embankment (novel) =

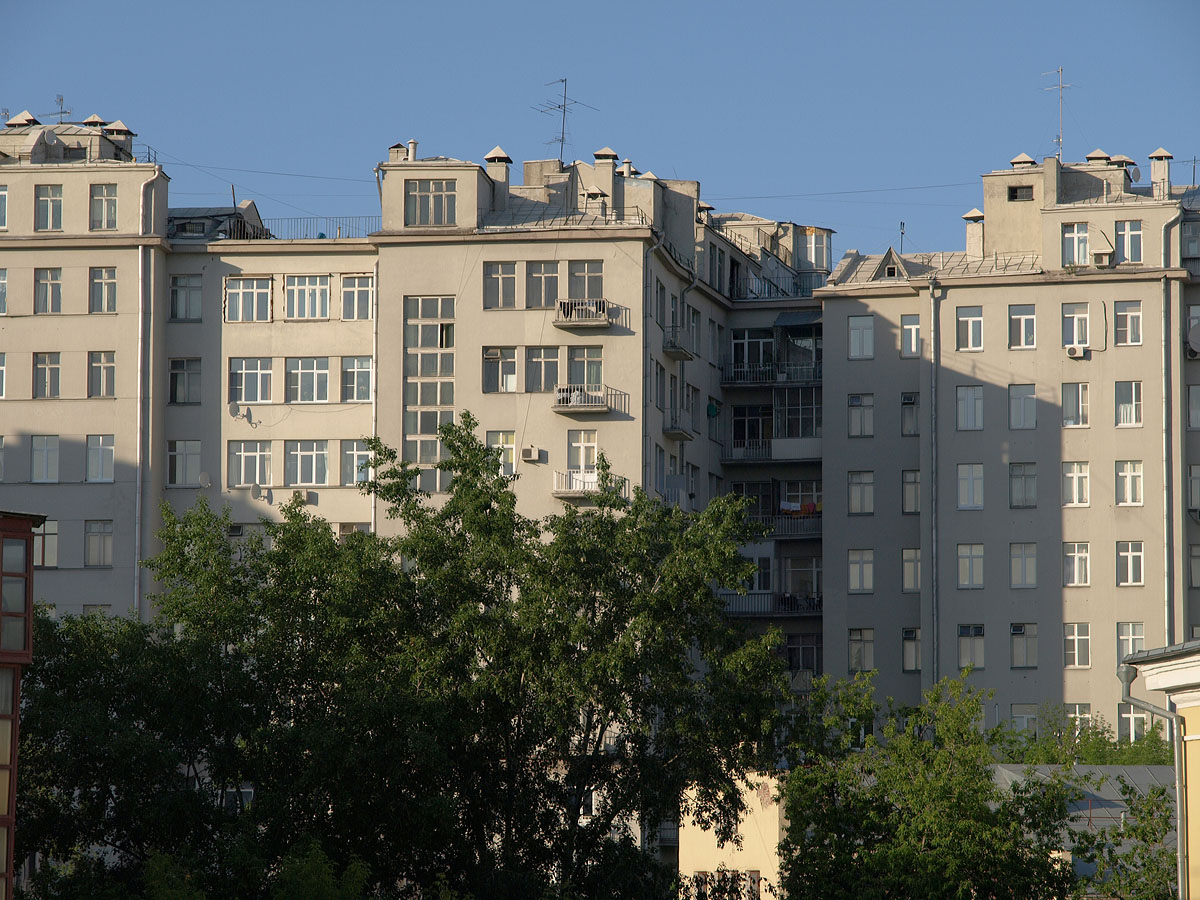
Back side of House on Embankment (central part), view from Patriarshy Bridge pedestrian walkway

The House on the Embankment (Russian: Дом на набережной) is a 1976 novel by Yuri Trifonov. It is the final installment of Trifonov's cycle of Moscow novels set in the 1930s around the everyday lives of Muscovites, including the residents of the large House on the Embankment complex where Trifonov's parents had lived. The novel covers the era of the Stalinist purges, the post-war late Stalinist era, and the beginnings of stagnation.
