= The Exchange (Trifonov novel) =

1969 novel by Yuri Trifonov

The Exchange (Russian: Обмен) is a novel by Yuri Trifonov. It is the first volume of Trifonov's cycle of Moscow novels written in "urban prose", and portraying the everyday lives of Muscovite dwellers.
