= In Another Life =

In Another Life may refer to:

== Music ==
- In Another Life (album), by Bilal, 2015
- In Another Life, an album by Active Child, 2020
- "In Another Life", a song by Ashlee Simpson from I Am Me, 2005
- "In Another Life", a song by the Darkness from Easter Is Cancelled, 2019
- "In Another Life", a song by Emin Agalarov, 2013
- "In Another Life", a song by the Killers from Pressure Machine, 2021
- "In Another Life", a song by XTC from Wasp Star (Apple Venus Volume 2), 2000
- "The One That Got Away" (Katy Perry song), originally titled "In Another Life", 2011

== Television ==
- "In Another Life" (The Outer Limits), an episode
- "In Another Life", an episode of The Eleventh Hour

== See also ==
- Another Life (disambiguation)
- "In Another Lifetime", a song by the Desert Rose Band, 1990
