= The Old Man (Trifonov novel) =

1979 Russian edition (publ. Советский писатель)

The Old Man (Russian: Старик) is a 1978 historical novel by Yury Trifonov. The novel details the investigations of Pavel, a retired revolutionary, into the killing of a Cossack officer in his youth against the background of his purchase of a retirement dacha.
