= Another Life (novel) =

1975 novel by Yuri Trifonov

Another Life (Russian: Другая жизнь) is a 1975 novel by Yuri Trifonov. It is the fourth part of Trifonov's quintet of Moscow novels following the third volume The Long Good-Bye (1971). The novel focuses on a widow's reaction to the sudden death of her husband.
