= Taking Stock (novel) =

Taking Stock (Russian: Предварительные итоги) is a 1970 novel by Yury Trifonov. It is the second volume of his Moscow quintet.
