= German Lopatin =

Russian revolutionary, journalist, writer and poet

German Alexandrovich Lopatin (Russian: Ге́рман Алекса́ндрович Лопа́тин; 13 January 1845, in Nizhny Novgorod, Russia – 26 December 1918, in Petrograd) was a Russian revolutionary, journalist, writer and poet.

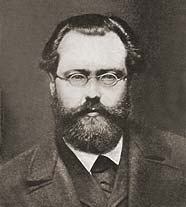
G.A. Lopatin

== Biography ==
Lopatin came from an aristocratic family. He studied physics and mathematics at the University of St. Petersburg, where he graduated in 1866 with a thesis On Spontaneous Formation. This thesis reflected the materialist ideas of the philosophers Vogt, Büchner and Moleschott, which were then extremely popular among Russian radicals.

== Career ==
In the course of his studies, Lopatin had become involved in radical student politics. In 1867 he travelled to Italy, hoping to join the revolutionary army of Giuseppe Garibaldi. Nothing much came of this. On his return to Russia, Lopatin became involved in the populist ('narodnik') movement. He belonged to the Ishutin Circle. Together with F.V. Volkhovsky, he organised the "One Ruble Society", a group dedicated to educational work and revolutionary propaganda among the common people.

Lopatin was soon arrested. Exiled to Stavropol in 1868, he began to study the writings of Karl Marx. He became one of the first Russian revolutionaries to be strongly influenced by Marxism. Marx and Engels thought highly of him. Under their influence he came to see revolution not so much as a coup to be carried out at will by a minority, but rather as a mass uprising requiring certain 'material preconditions'.

In 1870 Lopatin secretly returned to St. Petersburg and there helped organise the escape of P.L. Lavrov from banishment. Lopatin escaped to Western Europe soon after. In France he joined the First International and became a member of its General Council. In the summer of 1870 he visited London, England, where he struck up a friendship with Karl Marx and Friedrich Engels and began work on a translation of volume 1 of Marx' book 'Capital'. This translation was later completed by N.F. Danielson. In the winter of the busy and eventful year of 1870, Lopatin returned to Russia, intending to free the respected revolutionary writer N.G. Chernyshevsky from Siberia. However, Lopatin was himself arrested. He escaped from Siberia in 1873 and returned to Western Europe. Lopatin sided with Marx during the latter's conflict with Bakunin, which eventually destroyed the First International. He especially opposed the 'nihilistic' ideology of S.G. Nechaev, who was then an associate of Bakunin's.

In 1879 Lopatin returned clandestinely to Russia to work with 'Land and Liberty'. When that organisation split the same year, Lopatin sided with 'The People's Will'. However, he was arrested again. In 1883 he escaped from Siberia once more and returned to the West. In Paris he collaborated with Lavrov and other exiles in reviving 'The People's Will', trying to convert it from a Blanquist conspiratorial organisation into a mass party and arguing that the party should seek to organise the emerging industrial proletariat. Lopatin became a member of the party's Administrative Committee and served as its de facto leader. He was instrumental in unmasking the secret police agent S.P. Degaev.

However, in October 1884, in the course of yet another daring secret mission to Russia, he was arrested. A large number of addresses were found on him, leading to mass arrests and to the Trial of the 21 in 1887. Lopatin was sentenced to life imprisonment in the notorious Shlisselburg Fortress. During this incarceration Lopatin's health was seriously compromised. Lopatin was freed during the abortive Russian Revolution of 1905. He sympathised with the Socialist-Revolutionary Party, but was also respected by the Social-Democrats. Due to his broken health he did not become politically active but settled in Vilno (now Vilnius, Lithuania). He returned to St. Petersburg in 1913 and live in the 'House of Literati'. Lopatin welcomed the February Revolution of 1917 enthusiastically but opposed the October Revolution.

== Literary works ==
Lopatin was also a respected literary figure. In addition to his journalism, he wrote extensive poetry, short stories and an autobiography. Russian writers who praised him included I.S. Turgenev, G.I. Uspensky, L.N. Tolstoy and Maksim Gorky. Yuri Davydov's major novel, The Straw-Roofed Hut (1986), is based on the life of German Lopatin.

German Lopatin died of cancer in 1918.
