= Another Lifetime =

Another Lifetime may refer to:

- Another Lifetime, a 2007 song by REO Speedwagon from the album Find Your Own Way Home
- Another Lifetime, a 2014 song by Keke Wyatt from the album Ke'Ke'
