= The Long Good-Bye (Trifonov novel) =

Novel by Yuri Trifonov

The Long Good-Bye (Russian: Долгое прощание) is a 1971 novel by Yury Trifonov. It is the third of five volumes in his Moscow cycle.
