= Azbuka Vkusa =

Supermarket chain

- Industry: Retailer
- Founded: 1997
- Headquarters: Moscow, Russia
- Revenue: 53,529,200,000 Russian ruble (2017)
- Website: av.ru

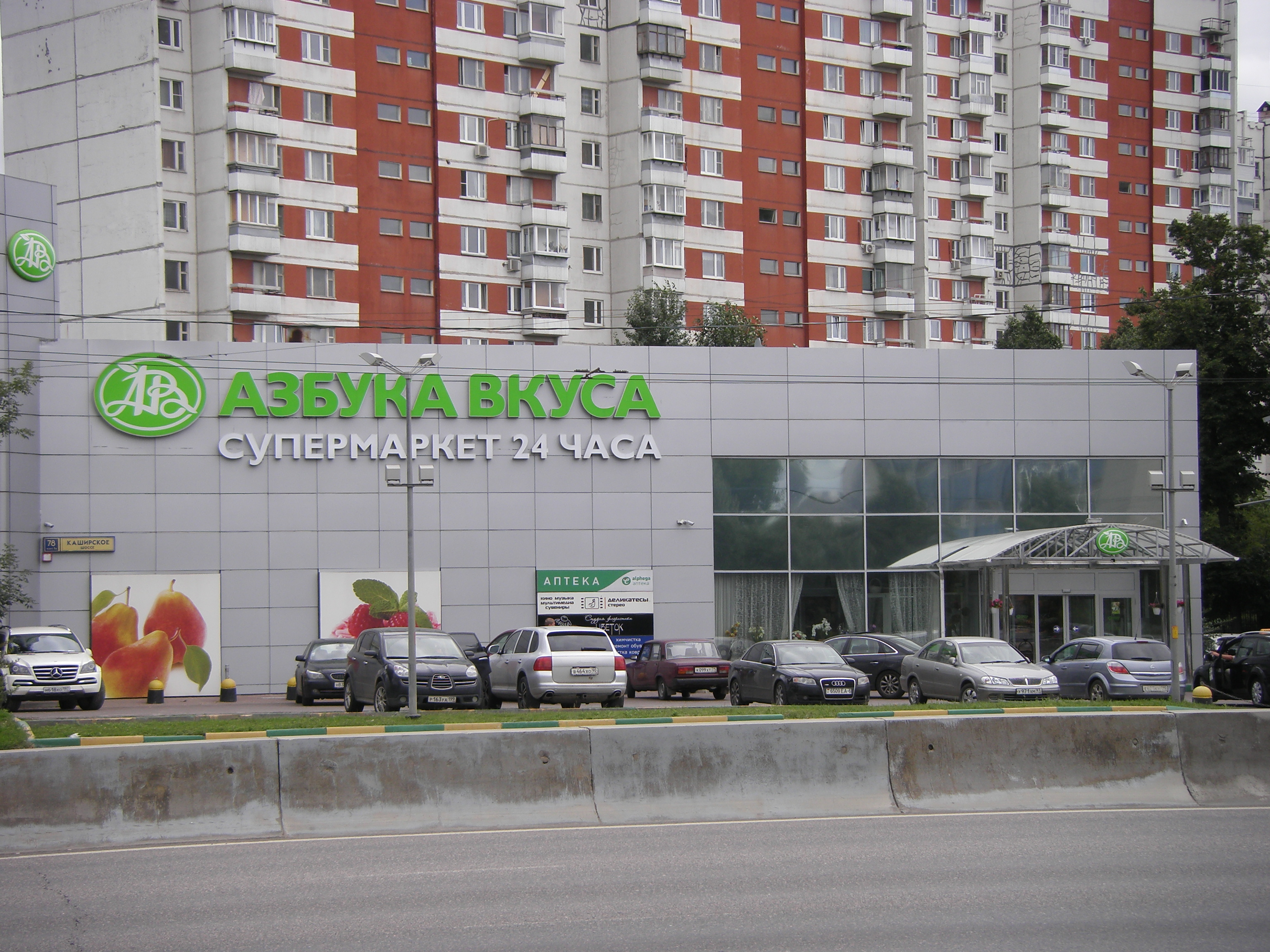
A store on 78 Kashirskoe Motorway, Moscow

Azbuka Vkusa (Russian: Азбука вкуса), translated in English as Alphabet of Taste, is a premium supermarket chain founded by Maxim Koscheenko and Oleg Lytkin. The first store was opened in Moscow in 1997. As of 2015, it operated 90 stores in Moscow, Saint Petersburg and its suburbs.

== Operation ==
As of January 2020, the network included 102 Azbuka Vkusa supermarkets, 57 AB Daily mini markets, 3 Enotheques and one AB Bistro restaurant, most of the stores are located in Moscow, some supermarkets are in the Moscow region and St. Petersburg. The standard retail area of the supermarket is 300–800 km^{2} (120–310 sq mi).

Revenue for the 2020 fiscal year amounted to 75.2 billion rubles.

In 2015, Azbuka Vkusa certified its culinary production (factory-kitchen) in Moscow according to the international standard ISO 22000, and then the scope of the standard was expanded to the bakery and confectionery production of the company.

== Private Labels ==
Azbuka Vkusa launched their store brands in 2011.

Azbuka Vkusa has expanded steadily since 1997, balancing external acquisitions and internal growth. The table below charts that growth using figures provided courtesy of the company.

Year	Revenue in US Dollars	Number of Stores	Floor Space in m^{2}
1997	Unavailable	1	223
1998	Unavailable	2	949
2001	Unavailable	3	1 639
2003	Unavailable	6	3 941
2004	Unavailable	8	4 372
2005	102 000 000	11	5 671
2006	177 000 000	19	11 122
2007	303 000 000	22	14 472
2008	315 000 000	24	16 190
2009	393 000 000	26	17 920
2010	568 000 000	40	27 355
2011	806 000 000	47	32 154
2012	879 000 000	53	37 066
2013	1 200 000 000	64	46 960
2014	1 600 000 000	90	60 000

== Owners and management ==
As of 2013, the founders of the network Maxim Kosheenko and Oleg Lytkin controlled more than 50%. 6.9% belongs to 14 top managers of the network. The rest of the package was in the hands of V.M.H.Y. Holdings Limited, owned by the former owners of Expobank — Andrey Vdovin, Pavel Maslovsky and Peter Hambro, who gradually acquired the package from two other co-founders of the network - Oleg Trykin and Sergey Vereshchagin, who finally resigned from the shareholders by 2011. Over 12% of the network belonged to Pavel Maslovsky's sons, Yuri and Alexei, as well as Kirill Yakubovsky, who sold them his share in August 2014.

The founders of the company, Maxim Kosheenko and Oleg Lytkin, own 42.6%. Another 12% is owned by V.M.H.Y. Holdings Limited, 4.4% are under the control of the top management of the retail chain. The remaining 41.1% are owned by Millhouse and Invest AG.

Denis Sologub is the president of the network, Maxim Kosheenko is the Chairman of the Board of Directors.
