= Valentin Trifonov =

Bolshevik activist and Soviet politician

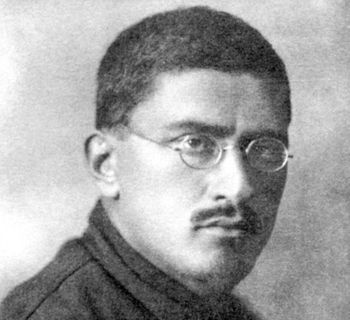
V.A. Trifonov

Valentin Andreyevich Trifonov (Russian: Валентин Андреевич Трифонов; 8 September 1888 – 15 March 1938) was a Bolshevik activist, Soviet politician and one of the leaders of Cossack revolutionary forces who played a major role in establishment of Soviet rule in the Don Voisko Province. His son Yury Trifonov became one of the most popular Soviet writers.

== Life ==
Born into a Cossack family, Trifonov joined the Bolshevik faction of the Russian Social Democratic Labour Party in 1904 and participated in the Russian Revolution of 1905. He was many times arrested by tsarist authorities and exiled to katorga. Prior to the October Revolution, he served as a secretary of the Bolshevik faction in the Petrograd Soviet.

Trifonov was prominent in formation of the Red Army, especially in the Ural regions. During the Russian Civil War, he led the Don Expeditionary Corps and was the first Chairman of the Revolutionary Committee of the Don. In 1919 he commanded the South-Eastern Front operating against Anton Denikin. In 1920 and 1921 he was in command of the Caucasian Front of the Red Army.

When the war was over, Trifonov presided over the Military Collegium of the Supreme Court. His vital services to the Communist Party did not save him from being arrested and executed during the Great Purge; His wife, his daughter and his son (the future writer Yury Trifonov) survived him. He was posthumously rehabilitated in 1955.
