= Yury Trifonov =

Soviet writer (1925–1981)

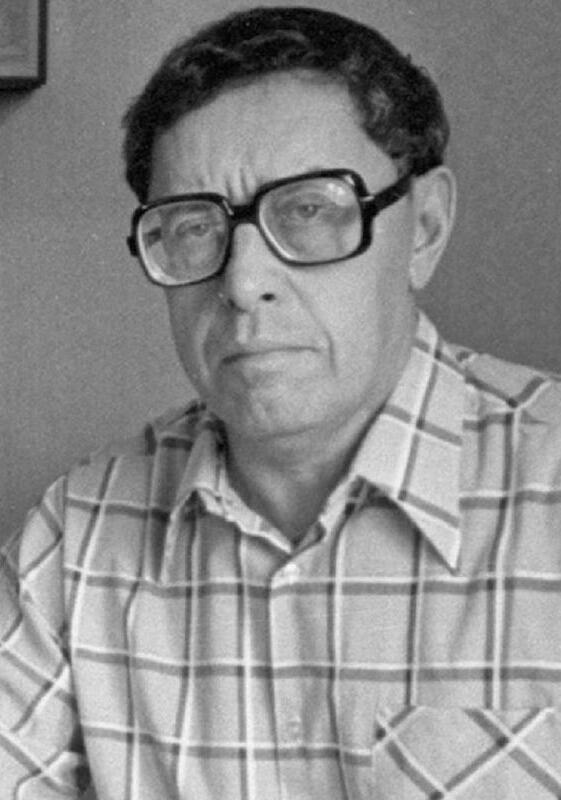
- Born: 28 August 1925; Moscow, Soviet Union
- Died: 28 March 1981 (aged 55); Moscow, Soviet Union
- Writing career
- Language: Russian
- Notable works: The House on the Embankment; The Impatient Ones; The Old Man

Yury Valentinovich Trifonov (Russian: Юрий Валентинович Трифонов; 28 August 1925 – 28 March 1981) was a Soviet poet and writer. He was a leading representative of the so-called Soviet "Urban Prose". He was considered a close contender for the Nobel Prize in Literature in 1981.

== Childhood and family ==
Trifonov was born in the luxurious apartments on the Arbat Street and, with a two-year interval in Tashkent, spent his whole life in Moscow. His father, Valentin Trifonov (1888–1938), was of Russian Don Cossack descent. An Old Bolshevik and Red Army veteran who commanded Cossacks in the Don during the civil war and later served as a Soviet official, he was arrested on 21/22 June 1937 and shot on 15 March 1938. He was rehabilitated on 3 November 1955.

Trifonov's mother, Evgeniya Abramovna Lurie (1904–1975), an engineer and accountant, was of half Russian and of half Jewish descent. She spent eight years in a labour camp for not denouncing her husband. She was released in 1945, and returned to Moscow in 1946. Later in life, she worked in a school library, and wrote children's books under the name E. Tayurina. She was rehabilitated in 1955. During their mother's imprisonment, Trifonov and his sister were raised by their maternal grandmother, Tatyana Aleksandrovna Lurie (née Slovatinskaya, 1879–1957), who had been a professional revolutionary and took part in the Russian Civil War. Trifonov's maternal grandfather, Abram Pavlovich Lurie (1875–1924), had been a member of an underground Menshevik group, and a cousin of Aaron Soltz. After the purge, Trifonov's family moved from the famous House on the Embankment (just across the river from the Kremlin), into a kommunalka.

At school, Trifonov edited class newspapers, composed poetry and wrote short stories. He spent 1941 and 1942 in Tashkent, capital of the Uzbek SSR. During the war, in 1942–45, he worked as a fitter in a factory in Moscow. In 1945, he edited the factory's newspaper.

== Career ==
Trifonov attended the Maxim Gorky Literature Institute between 1944 and 1949. His first novel, The Students, was published in Novy Mir in 1950, and won him the Stalin Prize. His next novel, The Quenching of Thirst, appeared only in 1961.

In 1964–1965, Trifonov published the documentary novel The Campfire Glow, in which he described the revolutionary activities of his father and his uncle Evgeny (the excerpts of whose diaries are included in the narrative) before the revolution and during the civil war. Later, he wrote several stories which were published in the Novy Mir, including Vera and Zoyka (1966) and Mushroom Autumn (1968).

The cycle Muscovite novellas, started in the late 1960s, marked the beginning of the "Urban Prose", portraying the everyday lives of city dwellers. The cycle includes the novels The Exchange (1969), Taking Stock (1970), The Long Good-Bye (1971), Another Life (1975), and The House on the Embankment (1976). The last novel describes the lives of the residents of the House on the Embankment in the 1930s, many of whom were killed during the Great Purge of 1937.

In 1973, Trifonov published the historical novel The Impatient Ones. The novel describes the assassination of Alexander II of Russia in 1881 by the People's Will party. It was nominated for Nobel Prize by Heinrich Böll. Another historical novel, The Old Man, was published in 1978. The collection of short stories House Upside Down and the novel Time and Place were published after Trifonov's death in 1981. Trifonov's last major work, The Disappearance, was only published in 1987.

Trifonov was also known as a sports journalist. He published numerous articles on sports; for almost twenty years, he was a member of the editorial board of the magazine Physical culture and sports.

== Personal life ==
Trifonov was married from 1949 to 1966 to the opera singer Nina Nelina (born Nurenberg), the daughter of the well-known artist Amshey Nurenberg. The marriage was ended by Nelina's death. In 1951, they had a daughter, Olga (Tangyan). Later, he was married to Anna Pavlovna Pastukhova, an editor. In 1975, he married for the third time, to Olga Romanovna Miroshnichenko (b. 1938), a writer formerly married to the writer Georgy Beryozko. Their son Valentin was born in 1979.

After Trifonov's death, Olga Miroshnichenko-Trifonova published her late husband's diaries and notebooks, going back to the writer's schooldays and ending in 1980. She published her memoirs of Trifonov in 2003.

== Death ==
Yury Trifonov died in 1981, aged 55, from a pulmonary embolism after an operation to remove a kidney. He is buried in Moscow's Kuntsevo Cemetery.

== Legacy ==
A memorial plaque dedicated to Trifonov was opened on the House on the Embankment in 2003.

== English translations ==
- Students: A Novel, Foreign Languages Publishing House, 1953.
- The Impatient Ones, Progress Publishers, 1978.
- The Long Goodbye: Three Novellas, Ardis, 1978.
- A Short Stay in the Torture Chamber, from The Wild Beach and Other Stories, Ardis, 1992.
- Disappearance, Northwestern University Press, 1997.
- The Old Man, Northwestern University Press, 1999.
- Another Life and The House on the Embankment (novel), Northwestern University Press, 1999.
- The Exchange and Other Stories, Northwestern University Press, 2002.
