= 1827 in Russia =

- Decades: 1800s; 1810s; 1820s; 1830s; 1840s
- See also: History of Russia; Timeline of Russian history; List of years in Russia

Events from the year 1827 in Russia.

== Incumbents ==
- Monarch – Nicholas I

== Events ==
- 24 October - Ivan Paskevich captures the Iranian city of Tabriz in the Russo-Persian War

== Births ==
- 1 January - Dmitri Kachenovsky, Jurist
- 2 January - Pyotr Semyonov-Tyan-Shansky, Geographer and Statistician
- 13 January - Nikolay Beketov, Chemist
- 11 April - Mikhail Nikolayevich Ostrovsky, Statesman
- 24 April - Karl Maximovich, Statesman
- 27 April - Nikolay Alexeyevich Orlov, Nobleman and Diplomat
- 14 June - Nikolai Severtsov, Astronomer
- 25 July - Fyodor Blinov, Inventor
- 27 July - Pyotr Andreyevich Shuvalov, Statesman
- 3 August - Sergey Urusov, Chess Player
- 19 August - Adrian Volkov, Painter
- 28 August - Catherine Mikhailovna, Noblewoman
- 21 September - Konstantin Nikolayevich, Nobleman
- 29 September - Fyodor Bronnikov, Painter
- 5 November - Nikolai Severtsov, Explorer and Naturalist
- 11 November - Boris Almazov, Writer and Poet
- 23 November - Karl Maximovich, Botanist
- Irina Fedosova, Storyteller and Folk Singer
- Nikolai Ivanenko, Governor of Kielce Governorate
- Nikolai Nikolayevich Malakhov, General

== Deaths ==
- 20 February - Stepan Stepanovich Apraksin, Military Commander and Aristocrat
- 31 January - Grigory Alexandrovich Demidov, Nobleman
- 15 March - Dmitry Venevitinov, Poet
- 29 April - Fyodor Gogel, Lieutenant-General
- Fyodor Bursak, General
- Pyotr Lopukhin, Politician
- Christine Rakhmanov, Actress and Opera Singer
