= 1826 in Russia =

- Decades: 1800s; 1810s; 1820s; 1830s; 1840s
- See also: History of Russia; Timeline of Russian history; List of years in Russia

Events from the year 1826 in Russia.

== Incumbents ==
- Monarch – Nicholas I

== Events ==
- Establishment of the Second Section of His Imperial Majesty's Own Chancellery and the Third Section by imperial decree.
- Establishment of the Chief of the Gendarmes
- 8 July - Start of the Russo-Persian War

== Births ==
- 1 January - Yakov Alkhazov, General
- 14 January - Ivan Naumovich, Ukrainian Russophile
- 27 January - Mikhail Saltykov-Shchedrin, Author and Satirist
- 28 February - Pamfil Yurkevich, Philosopher and University Professor
- 23 July - Alexander Afanasyev, Ethnographer
- 12 August - Pyotr Albedinsky, Journalist
- 4 September - Pyotr Albedinsky, Military Officer and Politician
- Viktor Gayevski, Literary Critic and Historian
- Fyodor Stellovsky, Publisher and Editor
- Pavel Sokolov (painter), Painter

== Deaths ==
- 16 May - Elizabeth Alexeievna, Empress of Russia
- Glafira Alymova, Harpist
