= 1830 in Russia =

- Years in Russia: 1827 1828 1829 1830 1831 1832 1833
- Centuries: 18th century · 19th century · 20th century
- Decades: 1800s 1810s 1820s 1830s 1840s 1850s 1860s
- Years: 1827 1828 1829 1830 1831 1832 1833

Events from the year 1830 in Russia

== Incumbents ==
- Monarch – Nicholas I

== Events ==
- The November Uprising (November Insurrection)
- Battle of Khunzakh
- Cholera Riots
- Sevastopol plague uprising
