= 1828 in Russia =

- Decades: 1800s; 1810s; 1820s; 1830s; 1840s
- See also: History of Russia; Timeline of Russian history; List of years in Russia

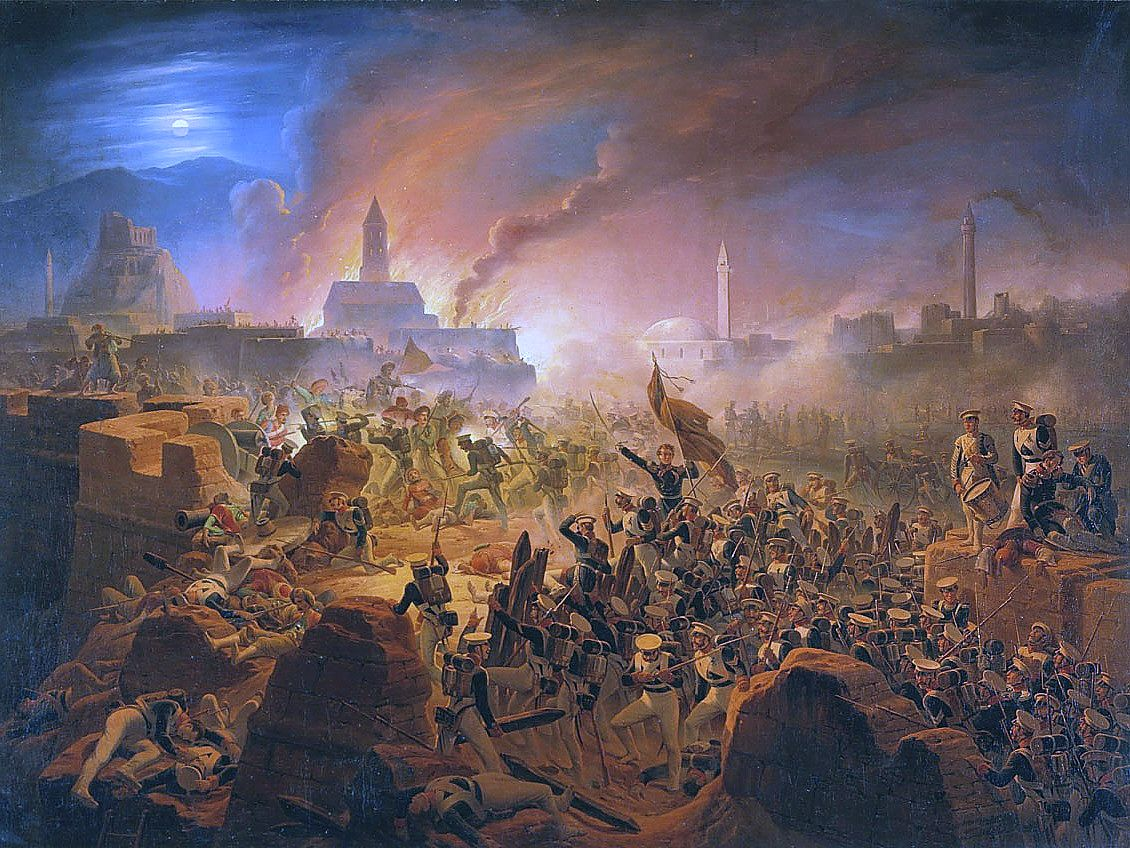
Siege of Akhaltsikhe 1828, by January Suchodolski

Events from the year 1828 in Russia.

== Incumbents ==
- Monarch – Nicholas I

== Events ==
- Aghdam
- Battle of Akhalzic
- Russo-Turkish War (1828–29)
- Office of the Institutions of Empress Maria
- Russo-Persian War (1826–1828)
- Treaty of Turkmenchay

== Births ==
- 24 July [O.S. 12 July] — Nikolay Chernyshevsky, Journalist, Novelist, Philosopher (d. 1889)
- 9 September [O.S. 8 August] — Leo Tolstoy, Writer and Religious thinker (d. 1910)
- 15 September [O.S. 3 September] — Alexander Butlerov, Scientist (d. 1886)
- 22 October [O.S. 10 October] — Mikhail Chernyayev, Major General (d. 1898)

== Deaths ==
- 15 March [O.S. 2 March] — Aleksander Pisarev, Playwright and Translator (b. 1803)
- 10 October [O.S. 28 September] — Stepan Shchukin, Painter (b. 1754)
