= Hniliczki affair =

Political-religious scandal in Galicia

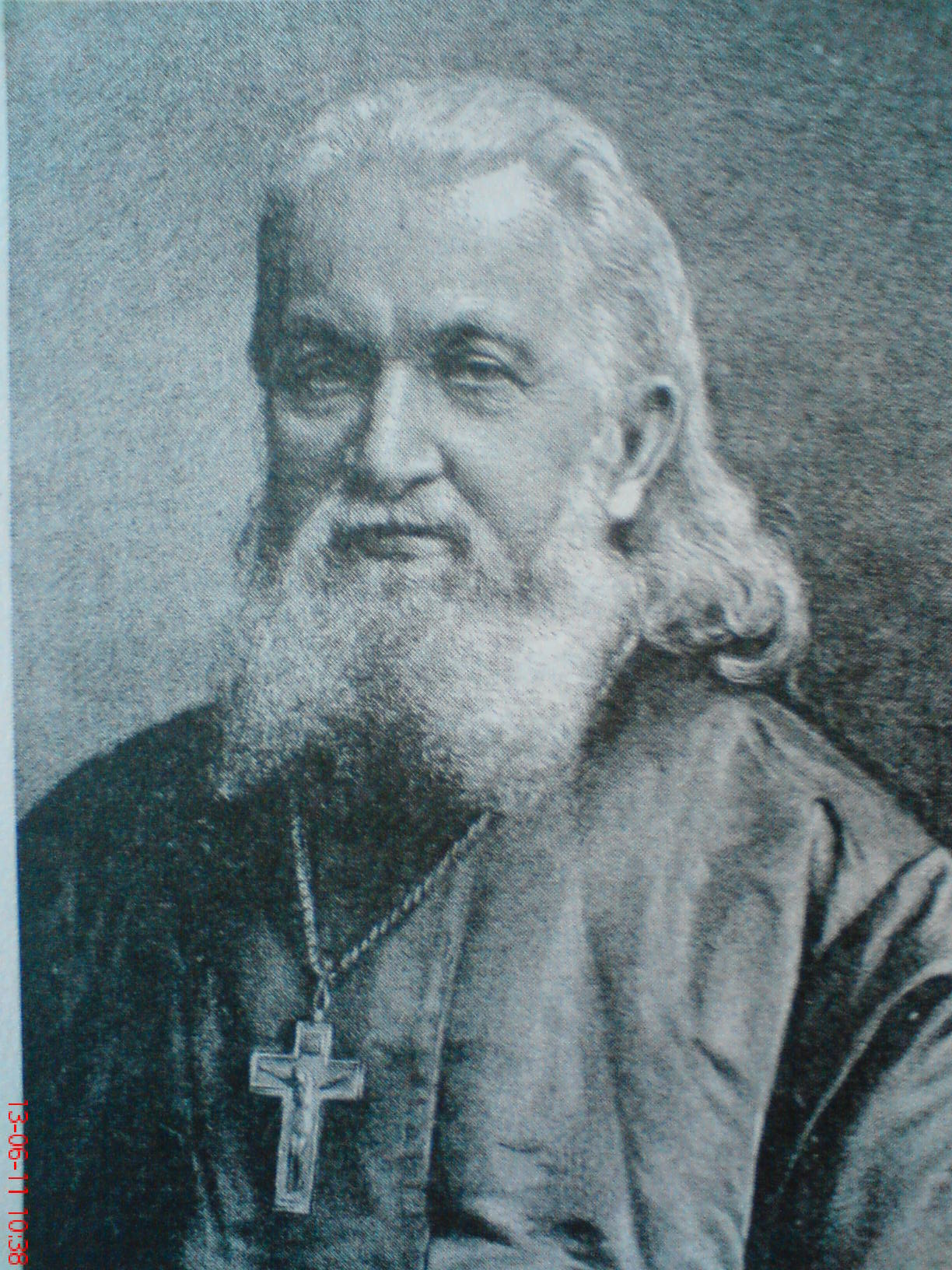
Ivan Naumovich

The Hniliczki affair, Hniliczki conversion or Hniliczki case was a political-religious scandal that took place in Galicia in the first months of 1882.

In late December 1881, 129 peasants, residents of the village of Hnylychky, legally converted from Greek Catholicism to Orthodoxy. Their motive for making this decision was a dispute with their parson and the desire to establish a separate Greek Catholic parish. The leading Russophile activist, Father Ivan Naumovich, inspired them to change their religion, without fully realizing the consequences. However, the political nature of the conversion was quickly detected, and the decision to change religion was reversed.

The Hniliczki conversion prompted the Austrian authorities to take decisive action against the Russophile movement in general. According to researchers, Austrian politicians were concerned about the development of Russian pan-Slavism, and when relations between Austria and Russia deteriorated due to conflicting interests in the Balkans, they decided to use the entire affair as a pretext to suppress the movement advocating for Galicia's unification with Russia. Father Naumovich and a group of nine other Russophiles were accused of treason, espionage, and disturbing public order. These charges were clearly exaggerated and, according to historians, exceeded the defendants' real capabilities. Ultimately, probably due to pressure from the Russian diplomacy, the trial ended with low sentences imposed only for disturbing public order.

The Hniliczki Affair is considered a watershed event in the history of the debate over the cultural and national consciousness of Galician Ukrainians. The Hniliczki trial prompted leading Russophiles to emigrate to Russia, and the Vatican to replace the Greek Catholic Metropolitan of Lviv, Joseph Sembratovych, with a pro-Polish and pro-Latin Sylwester Sembratowicz.

== Conversion of Hniliczki residents ==
=== Circumstances of the event ===
According to Włodzimierz Osadczy, the entire situation was the result of the involvement of Russophile activists in the conflict between the parson of the Greek Catholic parish in Hniliczki and the residents of the village of Hniliczki Małe. Since 1877, the Greek Catholic population living in this village had been requesting the establishment of a filial parish due to their insufficient number according to the Church regulations (800 people). The former parson in Hniliczki, Jan Herasimowicz (Harasimowicz), advised submitting a request on this matter to the county authorities and the consistory.

=== Conversion ===
At the turn of 1881 and 1882, the Galician press reported that 129 inhabitants of the village of Hniliczki Małe in the Zbarazh district submitted a request to convert from Eastern Catholicism to Orthodoxy. The application addressed to the county administration was dated 25 December 1881, and was signed by 21 individuals. They declared a change of faith from Greek Catholicism to Orthodox on behalf of themselves and their underage children. A longer letter was sent to the Greek Catholic consistory, in which the same individuals accused the Pope of violating the provisions of the Union of Brest, imposing it by force, and destroying churches. Latin rite priests working in Galicia were also accused of having a negative attitude towards the Ruthenian population. Particularly negative statements were made against the Jesuits, likening them to Pharisees and wolves in sheep's clothing. The application ended with a declaration of loyalty to the Emperor of Austria. A separate letter was addressed to the parish priest of the Orthodox parish of St. George in Lviv.

The investigation conducted by the Greek Catholic consistory in Lviv showed that the residents of Hniliczki Małe were unaware of the consequences of the conversion. They did not understand the word "Orthodoxy" and believed that the applications they submitted were only about establishing a separate Greek Catholic parish in the village. They had never read the letter to the consistory, which was written by either Father Naumovich or his son Mykola. After a visit from a commission of the Greek Catholic consistory to Hniliczki Małe, they revoked the decision to change their faith. The commission was satisfied with this declaration and did not conduct a deeper investigation to find the inspirators of the conversion. They accepted the version that the transition to Orthodoxy was suggested to the peasants by a local landowner, Count Della Scala, whose mother belonged to that faith.

The change of faith itself was not a crime under Austro-Hungarian law. However, in the case of the Hniliczki conversion, the authorities concluded that the authors of the applications were not motivated by religious reasons but by political ones. They also found that the consistorial commission did not sufficiently investigate the circumstances of the case. It was acknowledged that the accusations against Catholicism in the application indicated that the text was not written by the peasants of Hniliczki but by a well-known Russophile activist, the parson of the Greek Catholic parish in Skalat, Ivan Naumovich. Further investigation allowed for the identification of the host Ivan Szpunder as the actual leader of the group of converts. Szpunder maintained close contacts with Father Naumovich and shared his political views. Another important figure in the case was Oleksa Załuski, also a Russophile and a friend of Father Naumovich, who was in conflict with the Hniliczki parson due to his repeated articulation of unequivocally anti-Orthodox views. Seeing the dissatisfaction of the inhabitants of Hniliczki Małe with the lack of a church in their village, Szpunder began to promote the idea of adopting Orthodoxy, which was passed on to him by Father Naumovich. Ultimately, he convinced the residents of Hniliczki Małe when they learned about the plans to build a new Greek Catholic church in Hniliczki Wielkie; as parishioners, they would have to financially contribute to the investment. The clergyman himself, according to Włodzimierz Osadczy, wanted to show the consequences of the policies of the Austrian authorities, intervening in the religious life of the Galician Ruthenian population, and thus to force the authorities to choose: promoting the Latin rite or agreeing to the spread of Orthodoxy.

=== Reaction of the Galician authorities and the press ===
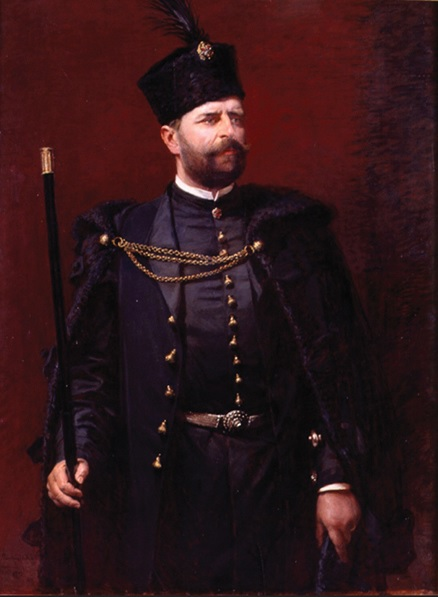
Governor of Galicia Andrzej Potocki, after the Hniliczek affair, decided to act decisively against Russophiles

The district administrator of Zbarazh, in a report to the High Imperial and Royal Governorship in Lviv, stated that the events in Hniliczki were a long-planned act of anti-state activity, as well as that:

This attack is only an outburst of the widespread Russophile agitation to disturb the minds of peasants, to disrupt peace and order, and to incite hatred against nationalities.

At the same time, this administrator, like the Greek Catholic priest of Hniliczki, claimed that there had never been any Russophile propaganda in the village, and the population did not express particular sympathy for Orthodoxy. In contrast, the gendarmerie from the town of Nowe Sioło, in a report to the district command in Zbarazh, stated that:

Hniliczki had long suffered poverty and distress because they did not have their own local priest, which they had requested, and the authorities could not delegate one to them, so they sent a declaration to the authorities that they would convert to Orthodoxy.

The Lviv press extensively covered the Hniliczki affair, accusing Russophiles of an anti-state conspiracy. Dziennik Polski stated that the agitation conducted by this group had become dangerous for the Austrian state and required a decisive counteraction. Similar comments appeared in other Polish newspapers. Kraków Czas interpreted the conversion as evidence of the internal decline of the Greek Catholic Church. Similar remarks were made in Gazeta Narodowa, Przegląd Lwowski, Gazeta Krakowska, Gazeta Kościelna, and Kurier Poznański.

The Greek Catholic Church itself sought to defuse the situation. Metropolitan Joseph Sembratovych issued a letter in defense of Catholicism on 31 December 1881, and two days earlier condemned the Russophile newspapers Prolom and Wicze. He also claimed that the critical opinions about the Church he led were exaggerated. However, after conducting preliminary investigations, which unequivocally established that the converts from Hniliczki were not motivated by religious reasons, the Austrian authorities decided to take decisive action against the Russophiles. This constituted a radical change from the previous attitude of the authorities towards this movement. Throughout the 1870s, Russophilia had been tolerated because it did not undermine the loyalty of Galician Ukrainians to Austria. The authorities only began to perceive it as dangerous at the end of the decade, with the development of the Russian pan-Slavic movement. Bernadetta Wójtowicz-Huber emphasizes that at the time of the scandal, Austro-Russian relations were particularly tense due to conflicting interests of both states in the Balkan region. Therefore, the Austrian authorities decided to use the entire affair as a pretext to eliminate the movement promoting the unification of Galicia with Russia.

In late January 1882, Father Ivan Naumovich, the editors of Russophile publications Josyf Markov and Wenedykt Płoszczański, court counselor Adolf Dobrianski (Dobrzański) and his daughter Olha Hrabar, as well as Ivan Szpunder and Oleksa Załuski, were arrested. Ultimately, Father Mykola Ohonowski, Russophile activist Apołon Nyczaj, and journalist Isydor Trembycki also stood accused. According to Stefan Kieniewicz, the Governor of Galicia, Andrzej Kazimierz Potocki, who had hitherto tolerated Russophile activities, now decided to repress them. The police searched the homes of the arrested individuals, finding a number of their letters and writings in which they expressed even more radical criticism of the Union of Brest and the Catholic Church in general than in their published texts, openly expressing their pro-Russian views. These materials were considered sufficient evidence to bring the most serious charges, including treason.

=== Reaction of church authorities ===
Provincial of the Jesuit Order, Henryk Nostitz-Jackowski, in a letter to the papal nuncio in Vienna, Serafino Vannutelli, described the Greek Catholic Church as "riddled with schism". This letter prompted Vannutelli to inform the Congregation for the Evangelization of Peoples, whose prefect, Cardinal Giovanni Simeoni, was perplexed by the attitude of Greek Catholic clergy professing Russophile views. Vannutelli also contacted Metropolitan Joseph Sembratovych, urging him to take decisive action.

== Trial of the Russophiles ==
The indictment against the Russophile group included charges of treason, espionage, and aspirations to detach Bukovina, parts of Hungary, and Eastern Galicia from Austria. The prosecutor accused the defendants of spreading Slavophile concepts in cooperation with the Slavic Charitable Committee, thereby engaging in activities favoring Russia. The involvement of some of the accused in the ceremonial movement in Galicia was also considered part of pro-Russian propaganda. According to Włodzimierz Osadczy, the charges were entirely unbelievable, and the alleged intentions of the accused went beyond the capabilities of the Russophiles. John-Paul Himka expressed a similar view.

The trial of the Russophiles, also known as the Olha (Olga) Hrabar and companions trial, began before the Regional Criminal Court in Lviv on 12 June 1882. The presiding judge of the tribunal was Lew Budzynowski, a Ukrainian nationalist.

The accused treated the trial as an opportunity to publicly express their political views. Testifying in court, Father Ivan Naumovich claimed that he acted out of "humanism, religion, love", convinced of the negative influence of the "Jesuits" on the Ruthenian population. He argued that Galician Ruthenians did not differentiate between their religion (Greek Catholicism) and Orthodoxy, regarding both as one "Ruthenian faith". He presented the view that fascination with Russian culture did not undermine loyalty to the Austrian state. He emphasized that he was not the organizer of a broader movement for conversion to Orthodoxy but merely hoped that such an act by the inhabitants of one village would prompt the Metropolitan of Lviv to convene a provincial Synod and the Pope to withdraw Jesuit and Resurrectionist orders from Galicia, which, in his opinion, contributed to the Polonization of the Ukrainian population. He also referred to issues not directly related to the trial, claiming that Polish-Ukrainian cooperation in Galicia would be possible if Ukrainians were guaranteed 47 seats in the Diet of Galicia and Lodomeria, giving them a real opportunity to defend their own interests.

The Russophile press referred to the defendants as martyrs suffering from Polish intrigue. Even newspapers aligned with Ukrainian Russophile factions, usually hostile to Russophiles, expressed solidarity with the defendants and emphasized that the trial concerned the problems of the entire Ruthenian community in Galicia (this support waned after the trial). In some Polish circles, the case was also seen as artificially inflated. The Russian press and diplomacy protested strongly against the trial of the Russophiles. Konstantin Pobedonostsev, Ober-Procurator of the Most Holy Synod, personally lodged a protest letter at the Austro-Hungarian embassy. According to Czesław Partacz, it was only after the Hniliczek trial that the Austrian government realized the significant support the Russophiles received from Russia, the extent of pro-Orthodox and pro-Russian propaganda in their press, and the substantial support the movement received from the Greek Catholic Church hierarchy.

According to Osadczy, the stance of the Russian diplomacy, and thus Austria's fear of worsening bilateral relations with Russia, may have influenced the final low sentences in the trial. On 29 July 1882, the court acquitted the defendants of the charge of treason. The evidence of their Russophile views did not support the prosecution's thesis of the existence of a widespread conspiracy to detach Galicia from Austria. Only M. Dobrianski was found guilty of collecting information about Ukrainian nationalists and socialists operating in Galicia. The court upheld the charge of disturbing public order. As a result, Father Naumovich was sentenced to eight months' imprisonment, Płoszczański to five, Szpunder and Załuski to three. The convicted were also burdened with court costs. The Supreme Court in Vienna confirmed the verdict of the lower court.

== Aftermath ==
According to Włodzimierz Osadczy:

The apostasy to Orthodoxy of the Galician community of Hniliczki in the Zbarazh district shook not only the province but also resonated loudly in the high offices of Vienna and the apostolic halls of Rome. (...) Vienna and Rome took a series of decisive steps to radically influence the condition of the Ruthenians and the Church, or rather the Greek Catholic rite.

Pope Leo XIII, who closely monitored the situation in Galicia, removed from office the Greek Catholic metropolitan of Lviv, Joseph Sembratovych. He left Lviv in October 1882. He was replaced on the cathedral by his nephew, Sylwester Sembratowicz, a supporter of Polish-Ukrainian understanding and Latinization of the Greek Catholic rite. Together with Joseph Sembratovych from the chapter and consistory of Lviv, two canons with similar views also left, which contributed to the Church adopting a new political course, in line with the views of the newly appointed metropolitan.

Under the influence of the Hniliczki trial, the activity of the Russophiles also weakened. Some of them left for Russia, while others decided to temporarily limit their activities. The ritual movement also weakened, i.e., the activity of those Greek Catholic clergy who sought to remove Latin elements from the Greek Catholic liturgy. According to the Galician prefects, the Hniliczki affair caused the expected, i.e., deterrent effect. According to Czesław Partacz, Olha Hrabar's trial weakened the Russophile movement for the next twenty years. Despite the weakening of the Russophile movement, in the elections to the Diet of Galicia and Lodomeria in 1883, its representatives obtained seven mandates, while Ukrainian nationalists only got four.

== Bibliography ==
- Wójtowicz-Huber, Bernadetta (2008). "Ojcowie narodu". Duchowieństwo greckokatolickie w ruchu narodowym Rusinów galicyjskich (1867-1918) (in Polish). Warsaw: Wydawnictwa Uniwersytetu Warszawskiego. ISBN 978-83-235-0383-5.
- Osadczy, Włodzimierz (2007). Święta Ruś. Rozwój i oddziaływanie idei prawosławia w Galicji (in Polish). Lublin: Wydawnictwo Uniwersytetu Marii Curie-Skłodowskiej. ISBN 978-83-227-2672-3.
- Himka, John-Paul (1999). Religion and Nationality in Western Ukraine. The Greek Catholic Church and the Ruthenian National Movement in Galicia, 1867-1900. Montreal: McGill-Queen's Press. ISBN 0-7735-1812-6.
- Partacz, Czesław (1997). Od Badeniego do Potockiego. Stosunki polsko-ukraińskie w Galicji w latach 1888-1908 (in Polish). Toruń: Wydawnictwo Adam Marszałek. ISBN 83-7174-090-5.
