= Battle of Aladzha =

1877 battle of the Russo-Turkish War (1877–1878)

- Part of the Russo-Turkish War (1877–1878)
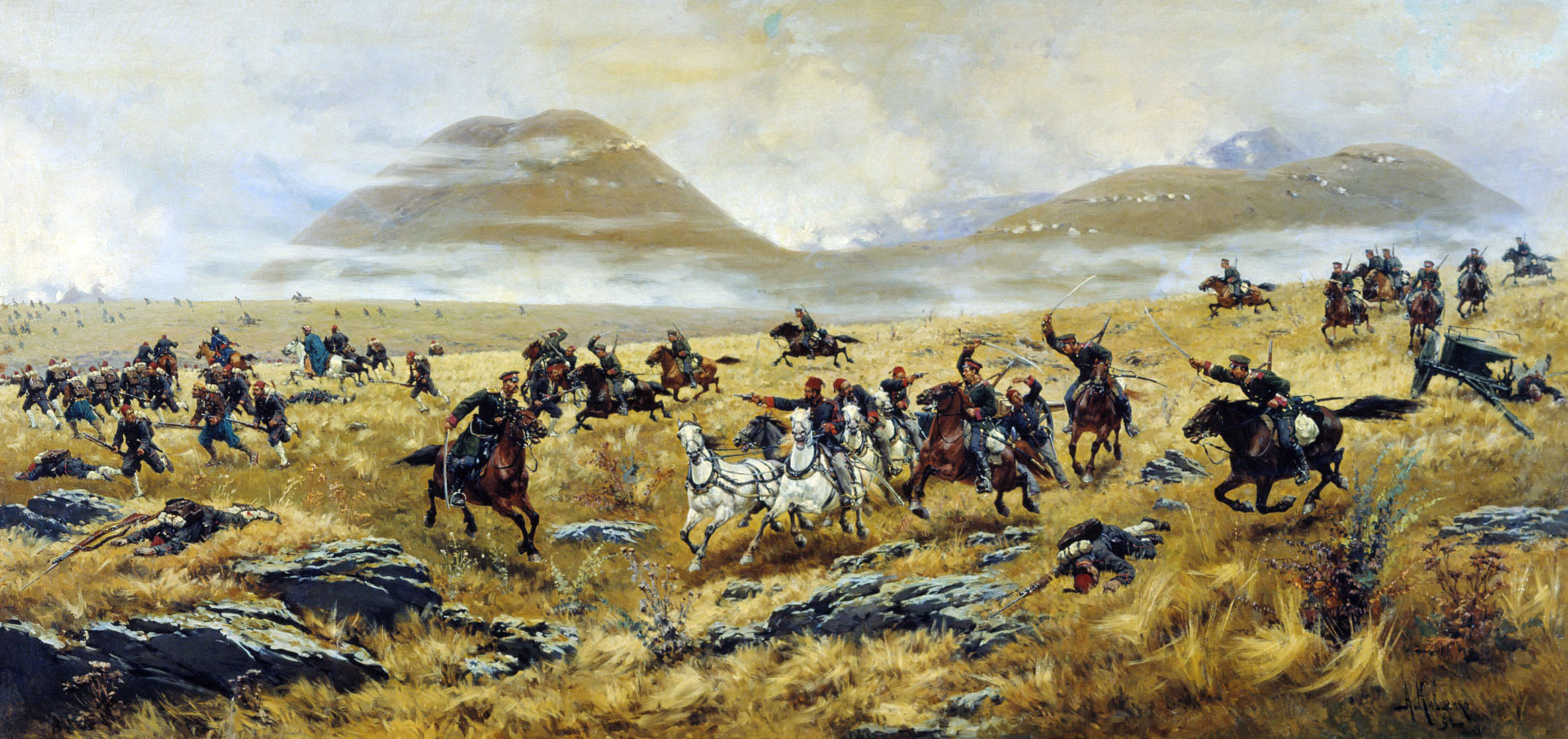
- Aleksey Kivshenko. Russian cavalry pursues the Turks during the battle
Date	2–15 October 1877
Location	Aladzha heights, Ottoman Empire 40°22′25″N 43°24′59″E
Result	Russian victory

Belligerents
Russian Empire	Ottoman Empire

Commanders and leaders
Grand Duke Michael Nikolaevich of Russia; Mikhail Loris-Melikov; Yakov Alkhazov	Ahmed Muhtar Pasha

Strength
56,000; 220 guns	38,000; 74 guns, 18 mules

Casualties and losses
764 killed 4,707 wounded 107 prisoners Total: 5,578	10,438 killed and wounded, 8,948 prisoners, 3,000 deserters, and 18 mules Total: 22,386, 35 guns, 2 banners, 18 mules
- Location within Turkey Battle of Aladzha (Caucasus Mountains)

The Battle of Aladzha (Turkish: Alacadağ Muharebesi, lit. 'Battle of Alacadağ'; Russian: Авлияр-Аладжинское сражение, lit. 'Battle of Avliyar–Aladzha') was a key battle of the Caucasian campaign of the Russo-Turkish War of 1877–78. Russian troops broke through the defenses of the Turkish troops on the Aladzhin heights, which allowed them to seize the initiative and begin the siege of Kars.

== Bibliography ==
- James Reid, 2000: Crisis of the Ottoman Empire: Prelude to Collapse 1839-1878. Franz Steiner Verlag ISBN 3-515-07687-5
- Gazi Ahmed Muhtar Paşa, Eski Yazıdan Aktaran, 1996: Sergüzeşt-i Hayatım'ın Cildi-i Sanisi. Yücel Demirel: Tarih Vakfı Yurt Yayınları ISBN 975-333-045-6
