= Yakov Alkhazov =

Russian general

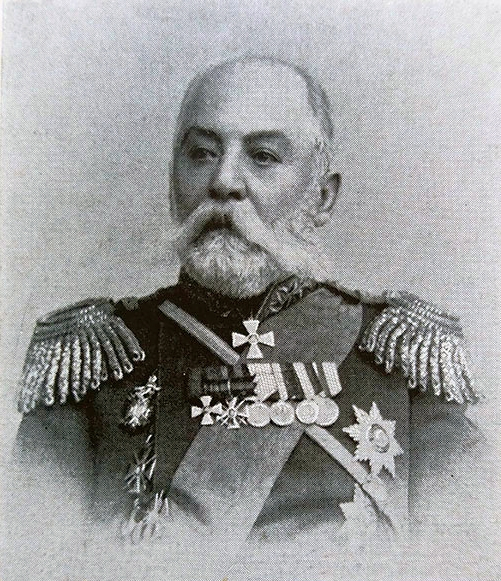
- Major General Ya. K. Alkhazov, c. 1894
- Born: 1 January 1826; Tiflis, Georgia Governorate, Russian Empire
- Died: November 3, 1896 (aged 70) Saint Petersburg
- Rank: General of Infantry
- Commands: Koporsky Infantry Regiment, 2nd Brigade of the 19th Infantry Division, 41st Infantry Division , Caucasus Grenadier Division , 3rd Army Corps
- Conflicts: Hungarian Revolution of 1848; Crimean War; January Uprising; Russo-Turkish War of 1877-1878: Battle of Aladzha
- Awards: see below

Yakov Kaikhosrovich Alkhazov (Russian: Я́ков Кайхо́срович Алха́зов; January 1, 1826 – November 3, 1896) was a Russian general who participated in the suppression of the Hungarian Revolution of 1848, the Crimean War and the Russo-Turkish War of 1877–1878.

== Origin ==
Some authors call Yakov Alkhazov an Armenian by origin, others, a Georgian. The military leader was of the Armenian-Gregorian faith. Alkhazov and his brothers attended the Armenian Church of St. Catherine on Nevsky Prospect in St. Petersburg, as evidenced by the entries in the church register of parishioners, where their patronymics were recorded as both Kaikhosrovich and Khristoforovich. According to the author of the book "Participation of Armenians in the Russo-Turkish War of 1877-1878" V. G. Krbekyan, his religion testifies to the general's Armenian origin. According to his great-grandson, Georgy Alkhazov, who researched the family tree, the general was Armenian by nationality, but the family of his father, Kaikhosro Gavrilovich Alkhazov, lived in Georgia and received Georgian nobility.

== Biography ==
After completing his course at the 2nd Cadet Corps with honors, where his name is inscribed on a marble plaque, Alkhazov was promoted to ensign in the Finnish Life Guards Regimentt on August 10, 1844, and to second lieutenant on April 10, 1848. Promoted to lieutenant on April 3, 1849, Alkhazov took part in the Hungarian Revolution that same year. On December 6, 1853, he received the rank of staff captain.

During the Crimean War, he was part of the troops guarding the coast of the St. Petersburg and Vyborg provinces from the landings of the allied Anglo-French fleet. In 1856, he received the Order of St. Stanislav, 3rd degree, in 1859, the Order of St. Anna, 3rd degree, and in 1861, the Order of St. Stanislav, 2nd degree. On August 30, 1860, he received the rank of captain.

In 1863–1864, Alkhazov, having been promoted to colonel on February 19, 1863, participated in the suppression of the January Uprising and for his distinction was awarded the Order of St. Vladimir, 4th degree with swords and bow, St. Anne, 2nd degree with swords, and St. Vladimir, 3rd degree.

On May 12, 1864, Alkhazov was appointed commander of the 4th Koporsky Infantry Regiment, on August 30, 1873, he was promoted to major general and appointed commander of the 2nd Brigade of the 19th Infantry Division in the Caucasus . In 1876, he received the Order of St. Stanislav, 1st degree.

During the Russo-Turkish War of 1877-1878, Alkhazov was first appointed head of the Kutaisi detachment (April 12, 1877), and then of the combined Kutaisi, Sukhumi, Inguri and Guria detachments, with which he pacified unrest among the Abkhazians and forced the Turkish landing force to clear Abkhazia and the entire Black Sea coast of the Caucasus; in recognition of these services, Alkhazov was awarded the Order of St. George, 4th degree.

For outstanding bravery and resourcefulness in affairs on the river Ghalidzga and at the cape of Ochamchire he received the Order of St. Anna of the 1st degree with swords. After the Turks sailed away from the shores of the Caucasus, Alkhazov joined his brigade in the troops operating on the Caucasian-Turkish border, and in September 1877 he participated in Battle of Aladzha heights with the army of Muhtar Pasha. On November 6, during the storming of this fortress, he commanded the column storming the forts of Hafiz Pasha and Karadag. For his bravery during the war he also received the rank of lieutenant general on October 24, 1877, and the Order of St. George, 3rd degree, on December 19, 1877 .

== Awards ==
- Order of St. George, 3rd class (1877)
- Order of St. George, 4th class (1877)
- Order of St. Vladimir 2nd class with swords (1877)
- Order of St. Vladimir 3rd class with swords (1864)
- Order of St. Vladimir 4th class with swords and bow (1863)
- Order of St. Alexander Nevsky (1889)
- Diamond badges for the Order of St. Alexander Nevsky (1894)
- Order of the White Eagle (1882)
- Order of St. Anne 1st class with swords (1877)
- Order of St. Anne 2nd class with swords (1863)
- Order of St. Anne, 2nd class (1863)
- Order of St. Anne, 3rd class (1859)
- Order of St. Stanislaus, 1st class. (1876)
- Order of St. Stanislaus, 2nd class. (1861)
- Order of St. Stanislaus, 3rd class. (1856)
- Badge of distinction "For XL years of impeccable service" (1886)
- Diamond ring with the monogram of Emperor Alexander II (1868 and 1871)
- Prussian Order of the Red Eagle 2nd class with star (1878)
