= Ivan Naumovich =

Ukrainian priest

Ivan Grigorievitch Naumovich
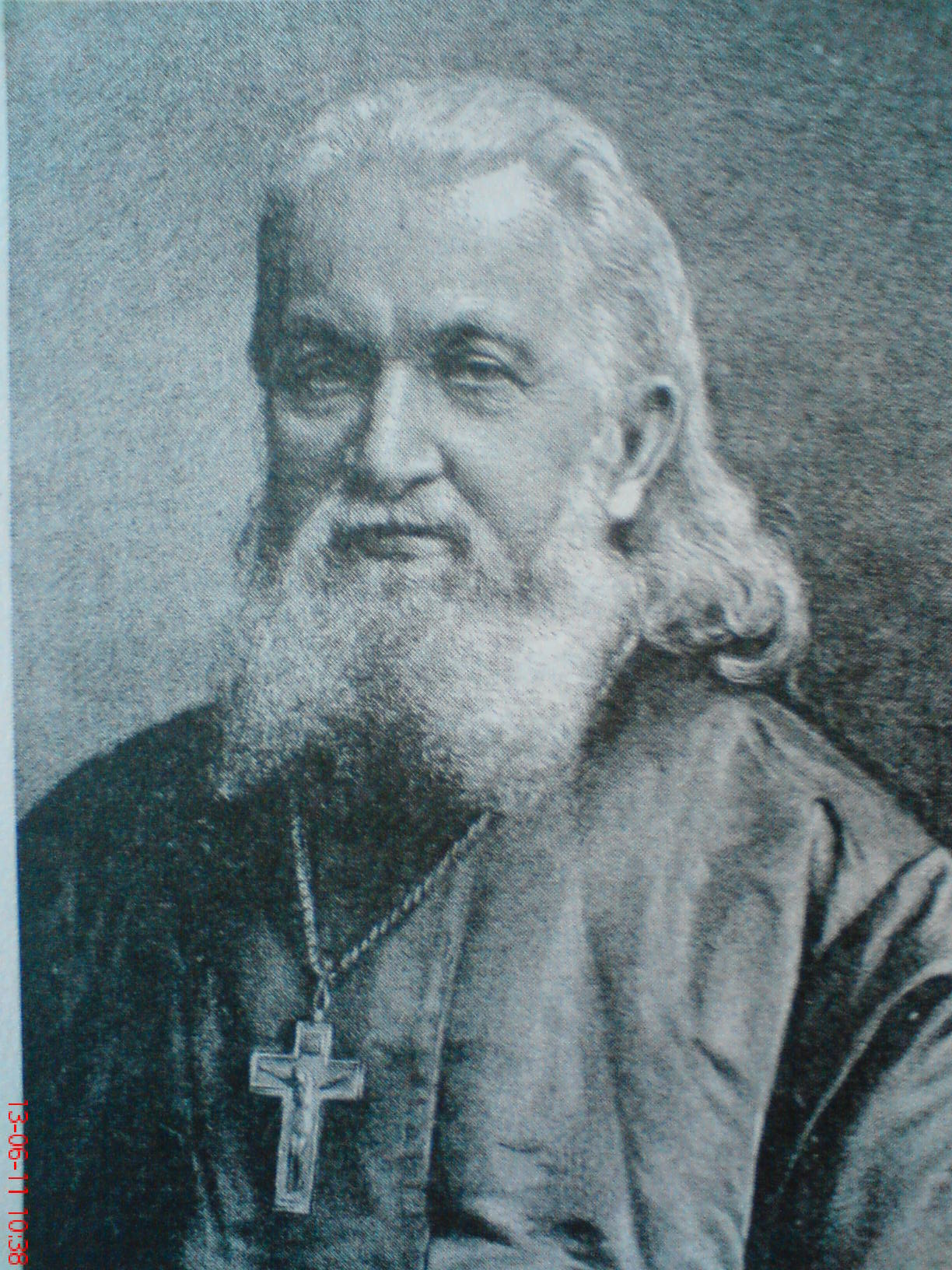

Personal life
- Born: January 14, 1826 Kozłów, Kingdom of Galicia and Lodomeria (Austrian Partition), Austria-Hungary (now Kizliv, Ukraine)
- Died: August 16, 1891 (aged 65) Novorossiysk, Black Sea Governorate, Caucasus Viceroyalty, Russian Empire (now Novorossiysk, Russia)
- Known for: A Glimpse into the Future

Religious life
- Religion: Ukrainian Greek Catholic, later Russian Orthodox

Ivan Grigorievitch Naumovich, also romanized as Ivan Hryhorovych Naumovych (Polish: Iwan Naumowicz, Russian: Ива́н Григо́рьевич Наумо́вич, Ukrainian: Іва́н Григо́рович Нау́мович; January 14, 1826 – August 16, 1891), was a priest, member of parliament, writer, and major figure in the Russophile movement in western Ukraine. His article, A Glimpse into the Future, was considered the most important manifesto of Galician Russophilism.

== Background ==
During the 19th century the area currently known as western Ukraine was the Kingdom of Galicia and Lodomeria, part of the Austrian Empire. Its people consisted primarily of Poles and Ukrainians. The Poles had ruled over western Ukraine prior to the Austrians having ruled over it, and made up most of the nobility. They dominated the region politically and economically. The Ukrainians, although a numeric majority, were mostly peasants or priests. During the nineteenth century the people who are now known as Ukrainians referred to themselves as Rusyny, typically translated as Ruthenians. Among the Ruthenians, two competing national ideologies developed: Russophilism, the belief that there was no such thing as a Ukrainian nation and that the people of western Ukraine were the westernmost branch of the Russian people, and Ukrainophilism, the belief that there was a Ukrainian nation separate from a Russian one and that the people of western Ukraine belonged to that Ukrainian nation. Although initially the Austrian authorities supported Russophilism as a counterbalance against the Poles, when Austria and Russia became rivals Austria shifted its support to the Ukrainophilia movement.

== Biography ==
Naumovich was born into a clerical family in western Ukraine, which was at the time part of the Austrian Empire; his father was a school teacher, and his grandfather was a priest. Like many with his social background, the family spoke the Polish language at home while maintaining Ruthenian traditions. When Naumovich entered a Ukrainian Catholic seminary in Lviv in 1848, he became swept into and joined the Polish revolutionary movement and attempted to convince other Ukrainians to join the Polish cause. These efforts met with complete rejection from the Ukrainian peasants, causing Naumovich to turn away from the Poles. Naumovich married in 1851 and finished his studies that year, becoming a parish priest in Skalat.

Initially, Naumovich focused his efforts on attempting to rid the Ukrainian Greek Catholic Church of various Roman Catholic rituals and practices that it had adopted during the centuries of Catholic Polish rule, a process referred to as purification, in order to reestablish the pure "Russian" character of the Church. Such actions earned him great popularity among the Ukrainian people, and he was elected to the Galician Diet in 1861 and the Austrian parliament in 1873. During this time, he was a passionate defender of the rights of the Ruthenian people against the Polish landlords and supported the division of the province of Galicia into western (Polish) and Eastern (Ukrainian, which Naumovich considered to be Russian) parts. Naumovich also founded the Kachkovsky Society, the Russophile counterpart and rival to the pro-Ukrainian Prosvita, which involved creating pro-Russian reading rooms for Ruthenian peasants.

The intensity of Naumovich's pro-Russian activities earned the distrust of the Austrian authorities and of the Catholic Church; a seemingly minor incident in 1881 led to his downfall. In that year, the 129 inhabitants of a small village demanded their own Ukrainian Catholic parish and church rather than pay to support the building of a new church in a neighboring village that would serve both villages. When their petition for a new church in their own village was denied, the villagers voted to convert their village to Eastern Orthodoxy. This event caught the attention of the Vatican and of the Austrian authorities in Vienna, who feared that it portended the beginning of large-scale conversion to Orthodoxy and to a Russian orientation. An investigation proved that Ivan Naumovich, despite being a Greek Catholic priest, wrote the peasants' petition requesting conversion to Orthodoxy.

In 1882, Naumovich was arrested for treason. Acquitted of that charge, he was instead convicted of disturbing public order and spent eight months in prison. In 1885, he was excommunicated from the Ukrainian Greek Catholic Church. Naumovich converted to Russian Orthodoxy and settled in Kyiv, then part of the Russian Empire, before becoming a parish priest in a village outside Kyiv. Naumovich died in 1891 in Novorossiysk.

== Writings and Ideas ==
In 1866, the Austrian Empire was defeated in the Austro-Prussian War and central authorities found themselves weakened. Representative of various nationalities took advantage of this weakness to agitate for demands for more power the central authorities. Unlike their Polish rivals in eastern Galicia, Ukrainian community leaders made no demands, instead declaring their strong loyalty to the Habsburgs and hoped that this loyalty would be rewarded. However, in order to appease the restless Poles, the Austrian authorities gave in to many of their demands. The demands included greater Polish control over lands at the expense of the Ukrainian rivals, who had declared their loyalty to Austria.

A Glimpse into the Future, anonymously written by Naumovich and signed as "One in the Name of Many", was a response to these events. It would become the main manifesto of the Russophile movement in western Ukraine. The manifesto had two parts. The first part was an attack on the traditional Ukrainian policy of unconditional loyalty to the Habsburgs. He identified the fact that "our kindheartedness and tact" towards the Austrian Emperor at the time of his defeat was less effective than the agitation of the Polish enemies. He contrasted the weak behaviors of Ukrainians with that of Serbs and Romanians within the Empire and proclaimed that if Ukrainian policies were to continue all Ukrainians would eventually become Polonized. This view of the situation eventually came to be accepted by most elements of Ukrainian society, even those (such as the Ukrainophiles) that did not follow Naumovich to the conclusion he drew in the second part of his article.

In the second part of A Glimpse into the Future, Naumovich concluded that the failure of Ukrainian leaders could be traced to their efforts to create a new western Ruthenian nation. He claimed that such efforts were in vain, and that from the perspective of ethnography, language, literature and ritual the people of Galicia, Kyiv, Moscow, Tobolsk, etc. were all one Russian people. According to Naumovich, only by uniting with other Russians would Galician Ruthenians be able to maintain their East Slavic culture, religion, and traditions. He proposed that Standard Russian should be adopted as the literary language among Ruthenians. He did not explicitly call for a detachment of eastern Galicia to Russia (perhaps in order to assuage the Austrian censors), but mentioned the case of Italian-populated regions of Switzerland which chose to remain in Switzerland rather than join Italy because they were "happy in Switzerland". Naumovich noted that, in contrast, Ruthenians were "not necessarily happy."

The publication of A Glimpse into the Future caused a response not only in the Austrian but also in the German, French and Russian presses.

Like other Galician Russophiles, Ivan Naumovich claimed a special place for the Ukrainian people within the Russian nation. He declared that the Russian language was derived from "Little Russian" and was only being readopted, and that the modern Russian language had been created in the seventeenth and eighteenth centuries by scholars from Ukraine.
