= Maria A. Neidgardt =

Russian noble

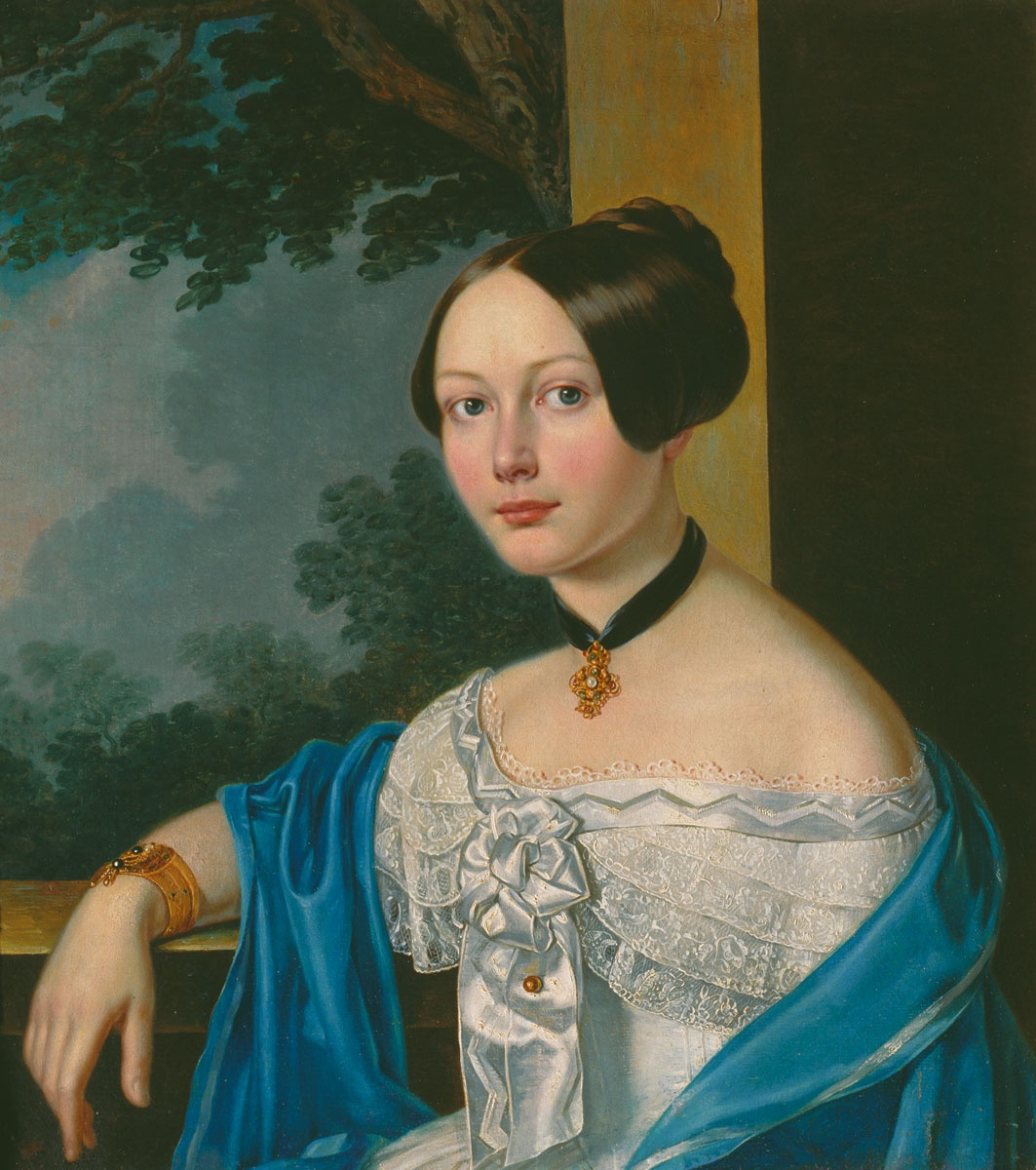
Portrait by Carl Yakovlevich Reichel, 1846

Maria Aleksandrovna Neidgardt (Мария Александровна Нейдгардт; née Talyzina (Талызина); 1831–1904, Moscow) was a Russian noble and courtier. She was a descendant of Alexander Suvorov.

Neidgardt was a noted philanthropist, decorated and officially recognized for her work: she was the chairperson of the royal women's charitable society from 1876 onward, and the founder of the Moscow Mariinsky School for Girls (1851).
