= Fyodor Gogel =

Fyodor Grigorevich Gogel
- Russian: Фёдор Григорьевич Гогель
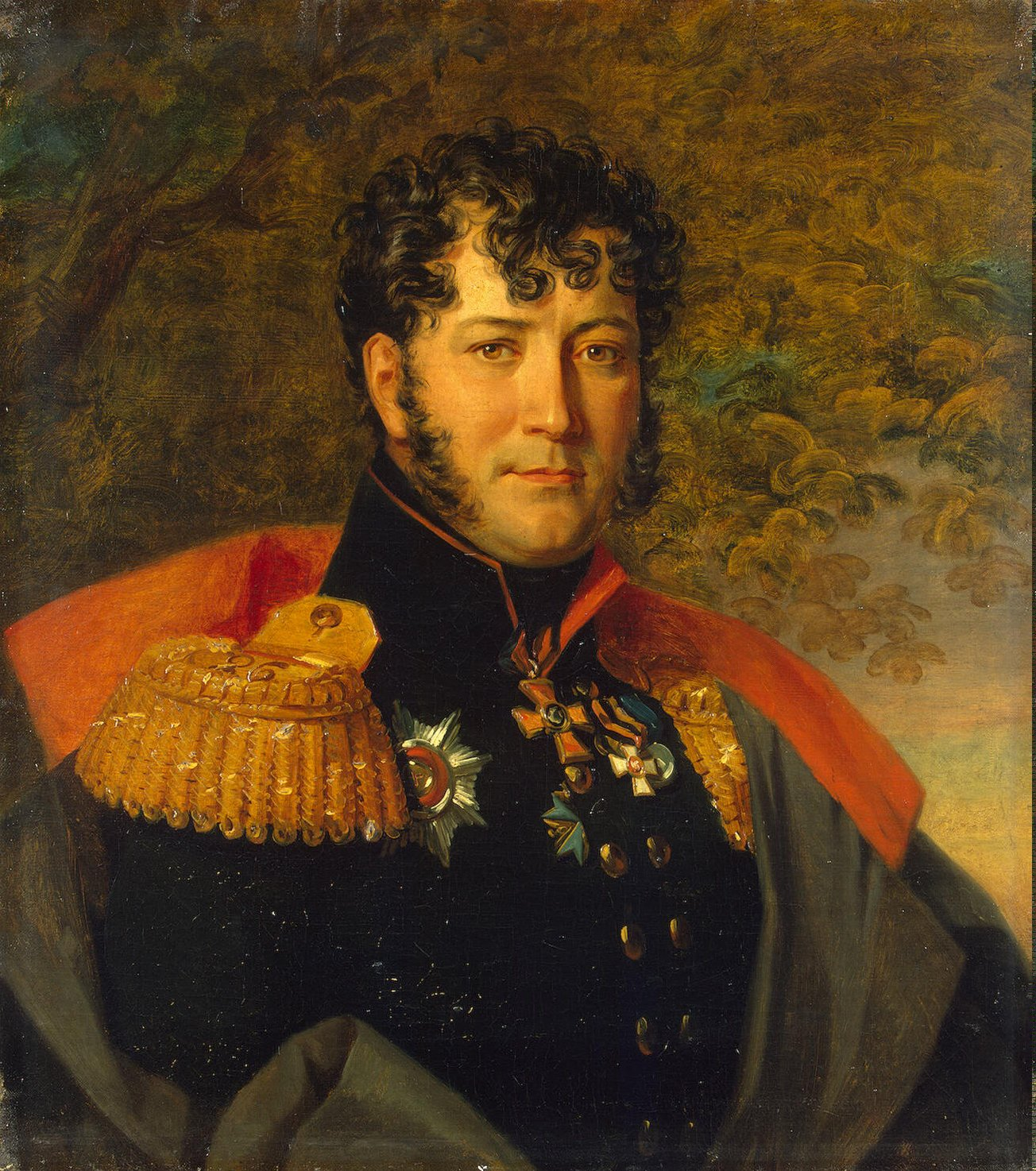
- Portrait of Gogel by George Dawe
- Born: March 12, 1775; Saratov, Saratov Governorate, Russian Empire
- Died: April 29, 1827 (aged 52); Belaya Tserkov, Kiev Governorate, Russian Empire
- Military career
- Allegiance: Russian Empire
- Branch: Imperial Russian Army
- Service years: 1785–1824
- Rank: Lieutenant-General
- Conflicts: Napoleonic Wars

Fyodor Grigorevich Gogel (Note: Also spelled "Fedor".) (Russian: Фёдор Григорьевич Гогель; born 1775–died 1827) was a lieutenant-general of the Russian Empire, principally known for his service during the Napoleonic Wars.

== Biography ==
Born in Saratov, to a noble family, Fyodor was the brother of Ivan Gogel, and a relative of Alexander Gogel. Fyodor entered military service on 12 January 1785, and became a captain, several years later, on 12 January 1792.

In 1805, he fought at Austerlitz. In 1812, he fought at Saltanovka, Smolensk, Shevardino, Borodino, Vyazma and Krasnyi.

For his service during the Napoleonic Wars, he received the Order of St. Anna (2nd class), Order of St. George (4th class), Order of St. George (3rd class), as well as the Prussian Pour le Mérite.

Fyodor was promoted to lieutenant-general on 24 December 1824.

== Sources ==
- Mikaberidze, Alexander (2005). Russian Officer Corps of the Revolutionary and Napoleonic Wars. Savas Beatie. ISBN 978-1611210026.
- Polovtsov, Alexander Alexandrovich, ed. (1916). "Гогель, Федор Григорьевич". Russian Biographical Dictionary (in Russian). pp. 440–441.
