= 19th Infantry Division (Russian Empire) =

- 19-я пехотная дивизия
- Active: 1914–1918
- Country: Russian Empire
- Branch: Russian Imperial Army
- Role: Infantry

The 19th Infantry Division (Russian: 19-я пехо́тная диви́зия, 19-ya Pekhotnaya Diviziya) was an infantry formation of the Russian Imperial Army.

== Organization ==
- 1st Brigade
  - 73rd Infantry Regiment
  - 74th Infantry Regiment
- 2nd Brigade
  - 75th Infantry Regiment
  - 76th Infantry Regiment
- 19th Artillery Brigade

== Commanders ==
- March 30, 1834 - 12/06/1837 - Lieutenant General Frolov, Pyotr Nikolaevich
- 06.12.1837 - 09.02.1842 - Major General (from 03.04.1838 Lieutenant General) Fezi, Karp Karpovich
- 09.02.1842 - 02.12.1844 - Major General (from 11.04.1843 Lieutenant General) Baron Rennenkampf, Pavel Yakovlevich
- January 1, 1845 - January 17, 1845 - Major General Labyntsev, Ivan Mikhailovich
- January 17, 1845 - 10/23/1845 - Lieutenant General Klucky-von-Klugenau, Franz Karlovich
- 23.10.1845 - 26.04.1848 - Lieutenant General Labyntsev, Ivan Mikhailovich
- 04/26/1848 - 11/26/1848 - Commander Major General Poltinin, Mikhail Petrovich
- 11/26/1848 - 07/02/1849 - Lieutenant General Schwartz, Grigory Efimovich
- 07/02/1849 - 12/06/1851 - Lieutenant General Schilling, Yakov Vasilievich
- 06.12.1851 - 23.03.1858 - Lieutenant General Kozlovsky, Vikenty Mikhailovich
- 03/23/1858 - 07/12/1858 - Lieutenant General Phillipson, Grigory Ivanovich
- 06.01.1865 - 27.10.1876 - Lieutenant General Svoev, Vladimir Nikitich
- хх.хх.1877 - xx.03.1881 - Major General (from 12/29/1877 Lieutenant General) Komarov, Dmitry Vissarionovich
- before 01.05.1881 - after 01.06.1882 - Major General Erkert, Georgy Gansovich
- 09/02/1882 - 12/22/1887 - Major General (from 05/15/1883 Lieutenant General) Dudinsky, Mikhail Fedorovich
- 12/22/1887 - 06/16/1897 - Lieutenant General Lomakin, Nikolai Pavlovich
- 06/23/1897 - 10/11/1900 - Major General (from 06/12/1898 Lieutenant General) Hoven, Nikolai Egorovich
- 04.12.1900 - 05.04.1905 - Major General (from 06.12.1900 Lieutenant General) Maryanov, Nikolai Fedorovich
- 07/12, 1906 - February 24, 1909 - Lieutenant General Fedorov, Pyotr Petrovich
- March 17, 1909 - September 27, 1914 - Lieutenant General Alexander Ragoza
- September 27, 1914 - 07/29/1915 - Major General (from 10/13/1914 Lieutenant General) Yanushevsky, Grigory Efimovich
- 08/25/1915 - 04/12/1917 - Lieutenant General Nechvolodov, Alexander Dmitrievich
- 04/12/1917 - 07/22/1917 - Major General Cherkasov, Pyotr Vladimirovich
- xx.12.1917 - xx.02.1918 - Krapiviansky, Nikolai Grigorievich
