= 1831 in Russia =

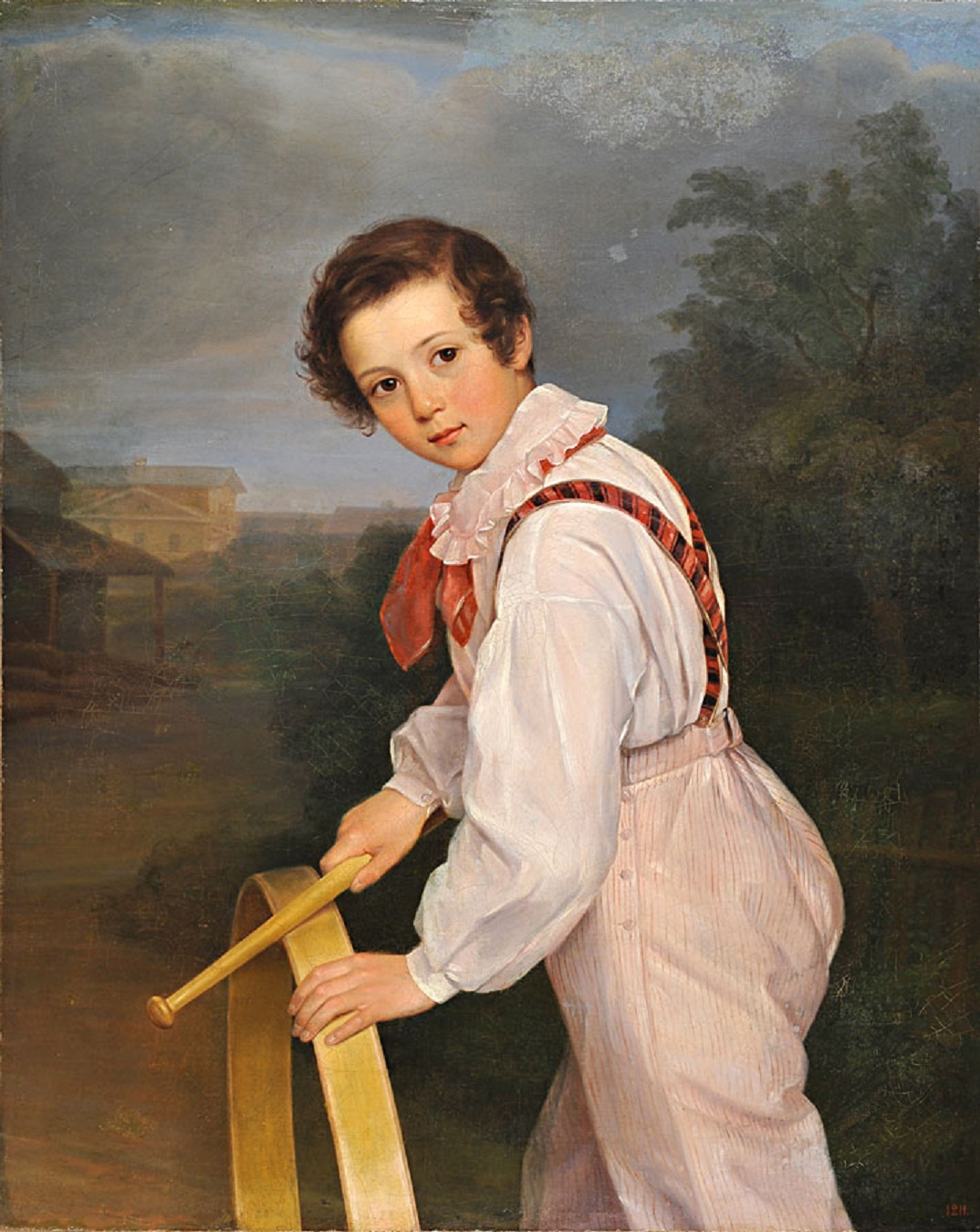
Sergei Bibikov by Pimen Orlov

Events from the year 1831 in Russia.

== Incumbents ==
- Monarch – Nicholas I

== Events ==
- Cross of St. George
- Kuopio Province
- Rumyantsev Museum
- Order of the White Eagle (Russian Empire)
- November Uprising

== Births ==
- Konstantin Leontiev
- Maria A. Neidgardt, courtier (d. 1904)
- Nicholas Nikolaevich
- Antoire Buchaswski

== Deaths ==
- Hans Karl von Diebitsch
- Löb Nevakhovich
