= Adrian Volkov =

Russian genre painter

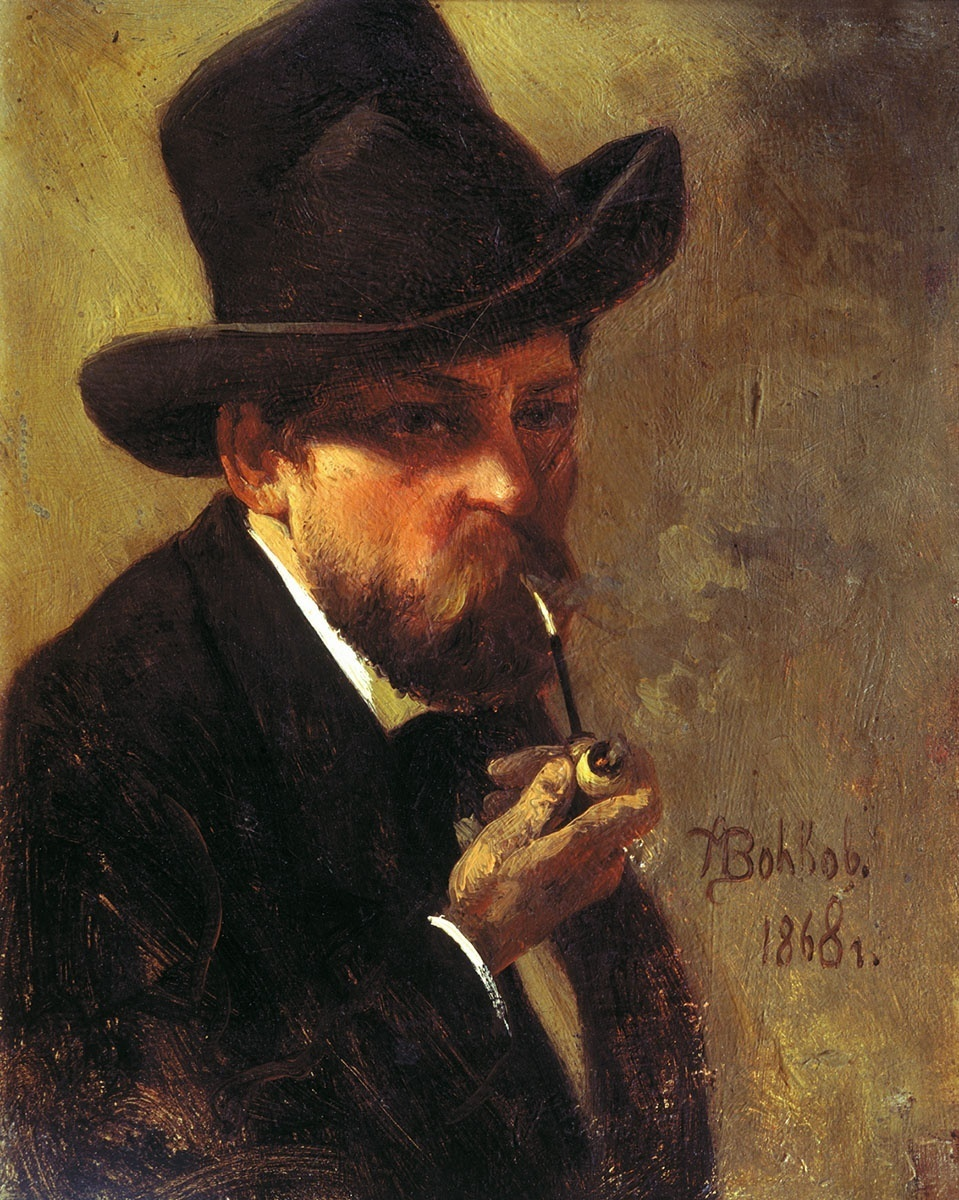
- Self-Portrait with a Pipe, signed and dated 1868, oils; Tretyakov Gallery
- Born: 19 August 1827; Chmutovo, Nizhny Novgorod Governorate, Russian Empire
- Died: 1 February 1873 (aged 45); Saint Petersburg, Russian Empire
- Education: Fyodor Bruni
- Known for: genre painting

Adrian Markovich Volkov (Russian: Адриа́н Ма́ркович Во́лков; 19 August 1827 – 1 February 1873) was a Russian painter, active in St. Petersburg during Tsar Alexander II's reign, best known for his genre pictures.

== Biography ==
Adrian Volkov was born on 19 August 1827, in Chmutovo, Nizhny Novgorod Governorate.

The artist studied at the Imperial Academy of Arts and was a pupil of Professor Fyodor Bruni.

He died on 1 February 1873, in Saint Petersburg.

== Awards ==
In 1858, Volkov received the title of class artist and was awarded a small gold medal of the Academy of Arts for his painting The Obzhorny Ryad in Saint Petersburg. In 1860, he was also awarded a gold medal of the academy for his work The Interrupted Betrothal.

== Gallery ==
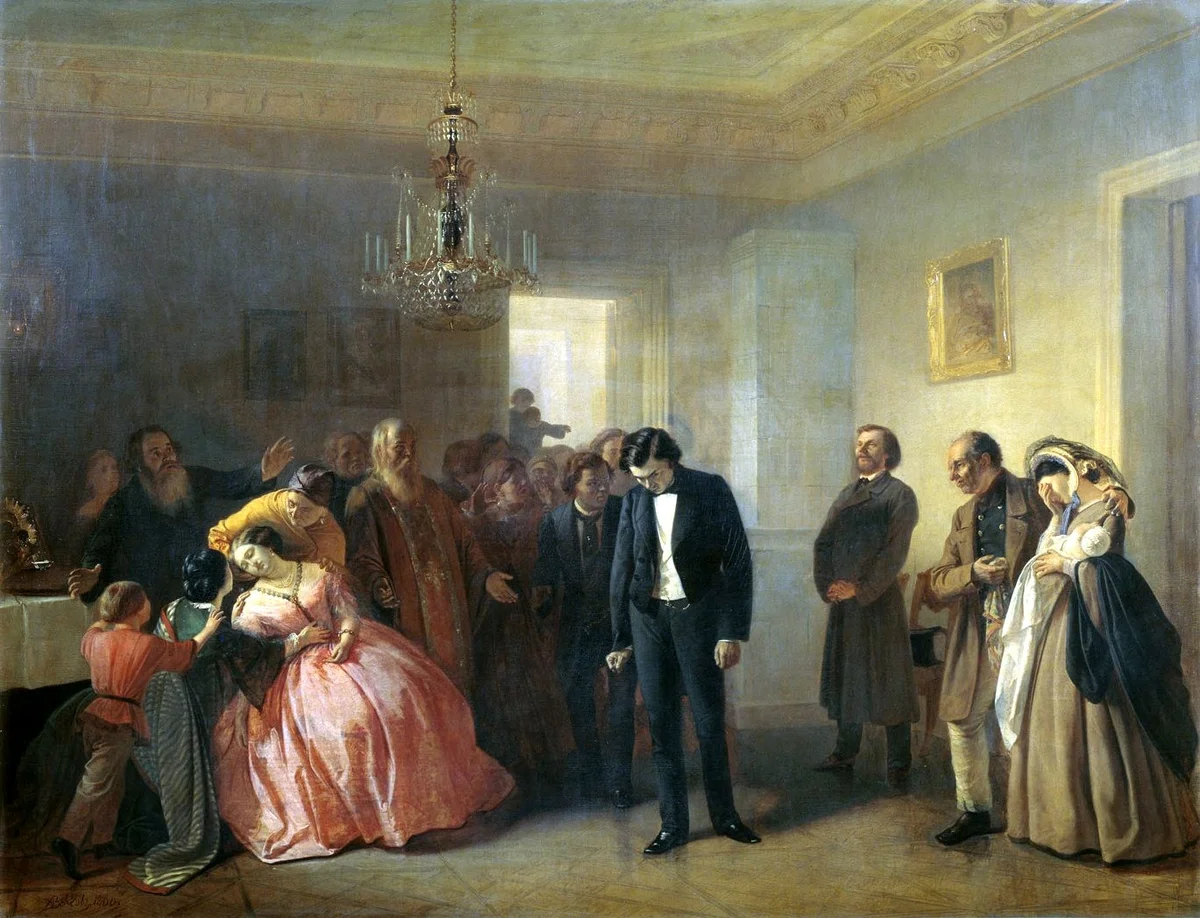
Interrupted Betrothal

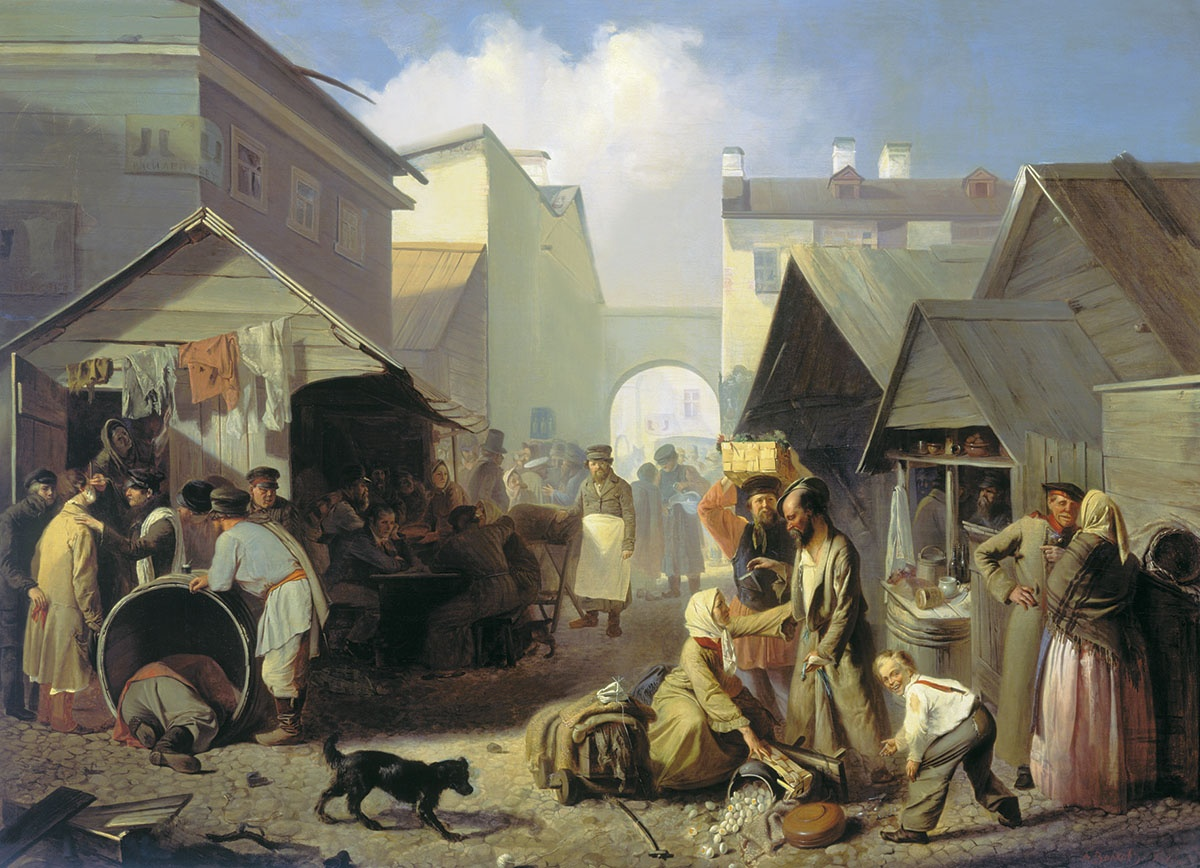
Obzhorny Ryad in Saint Petersburg

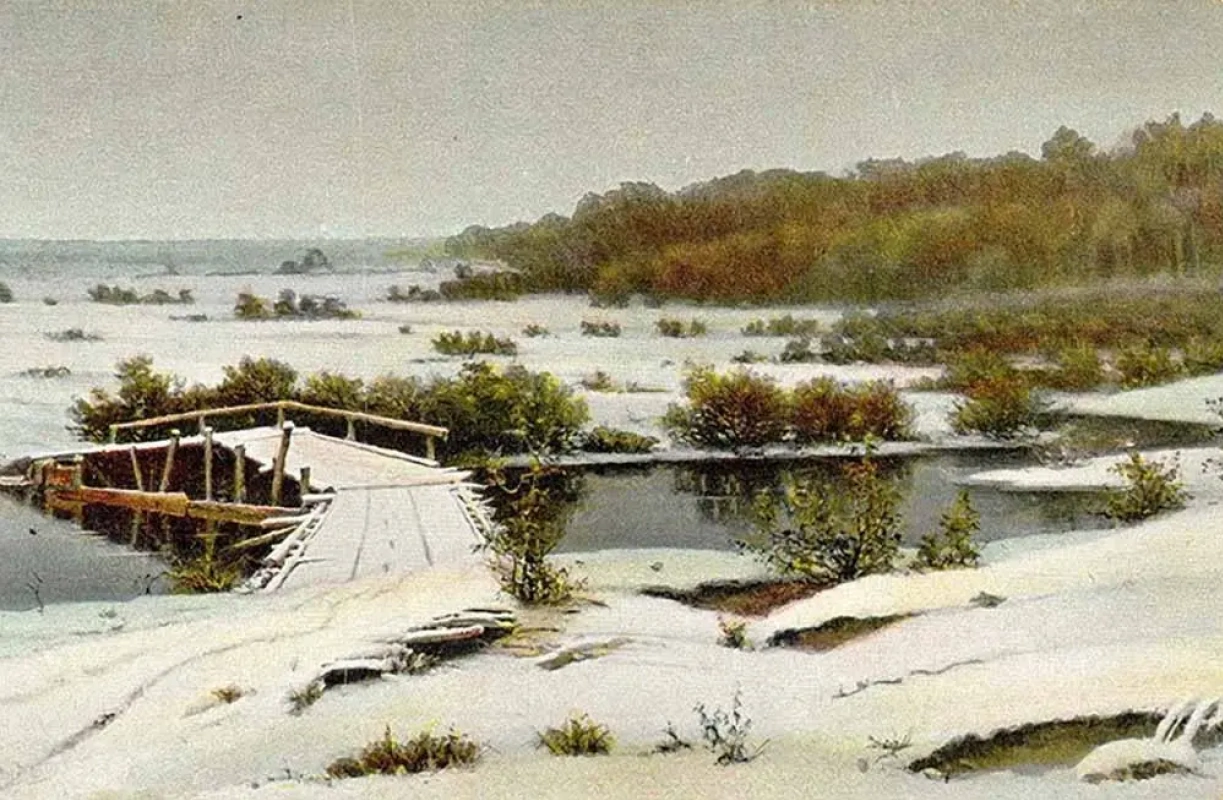
Early Snow
