= Maria Sinyavskaya =

Russian stage actress

Maria Sinyavskaya (1762 – 1829), was a Russian stage actress. She was engaged at the Petrovka Theatre in 1780–1801, and in the Imperial theatres in St petersburg in 1801–1807. She was referred to as the first tragedienne and the leading lady of the Moscow stage in her time. She was the sister of the actresses Uliana Sinyavskaya and Alexandra Sinyavskaya.
