= Massacre at the Russian Embassy in Tehran =

Massacre in Tehran

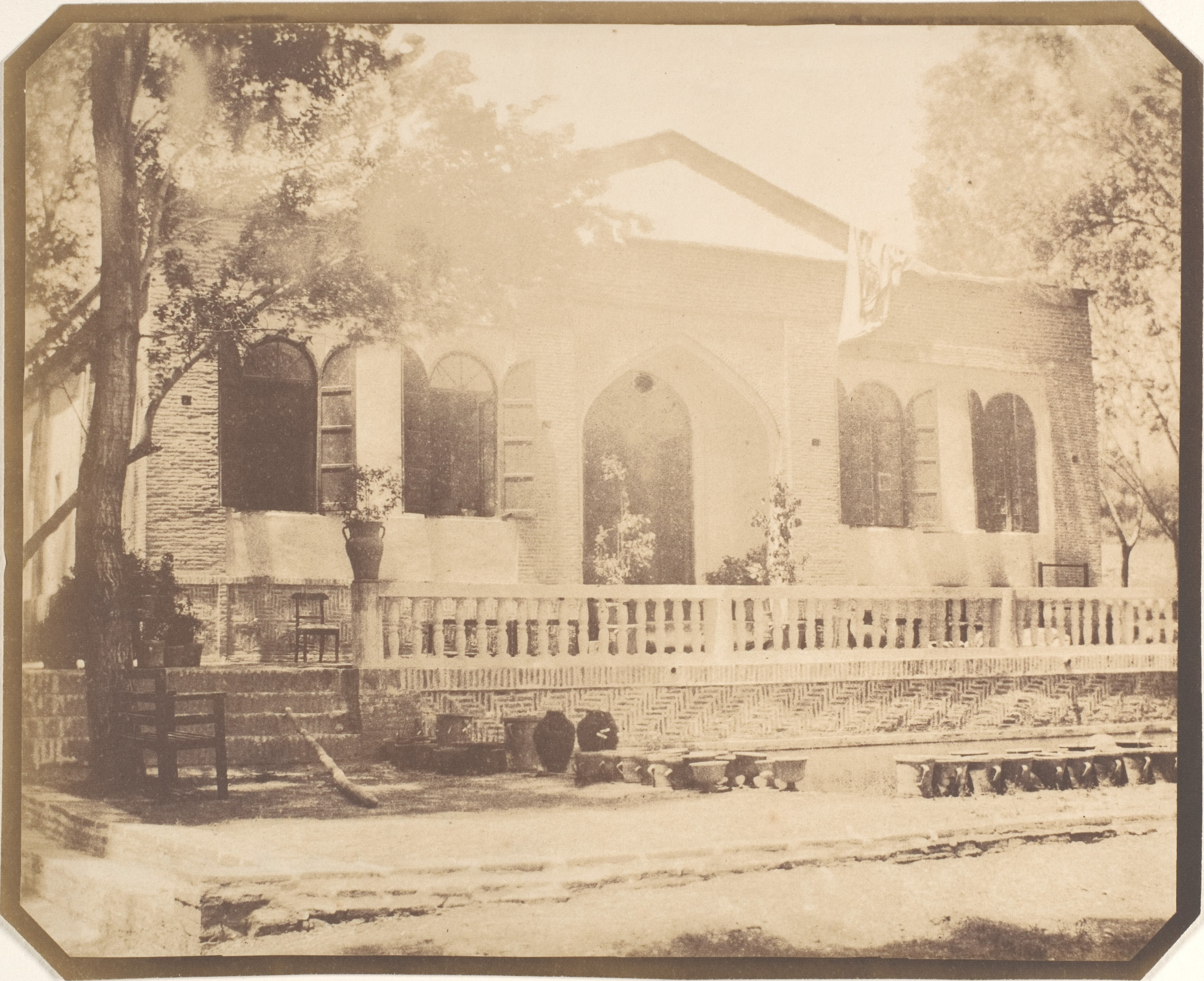
- The building of the Russian Embassy in Tehran
- Location: Tehran, Qajar Iran
- Date: January 30, 1829
- Target: Members of the Russian Embassy; Armenian refugees
- Deaths: 54
- Perpetrators: Persian Mujahideen, Employees of the British mission in Iran (Note: Some employees of the British mission could have been directly involved in the pogrom of the Russian mission, who, according to Ivan Paskevich, strongly opposed the active activities of Alexander Griboyedov, who defended Russia's interests in Iran)

Massacre at the Russian Embassy in Tehran, in Russian historiography Tehran Tragedy of 1829 (Note: Russian: Тегеранская трагедия) was a mass murder of members of the Russian embassy and the Armenian refugees they sheltered. Subsequently, the Mujahideen killed almost the entire Russian embassy. Among the victims was also the head of the diplomatic mission and part-time famous Russian writer Alexander Griboyedov.

== Background ==
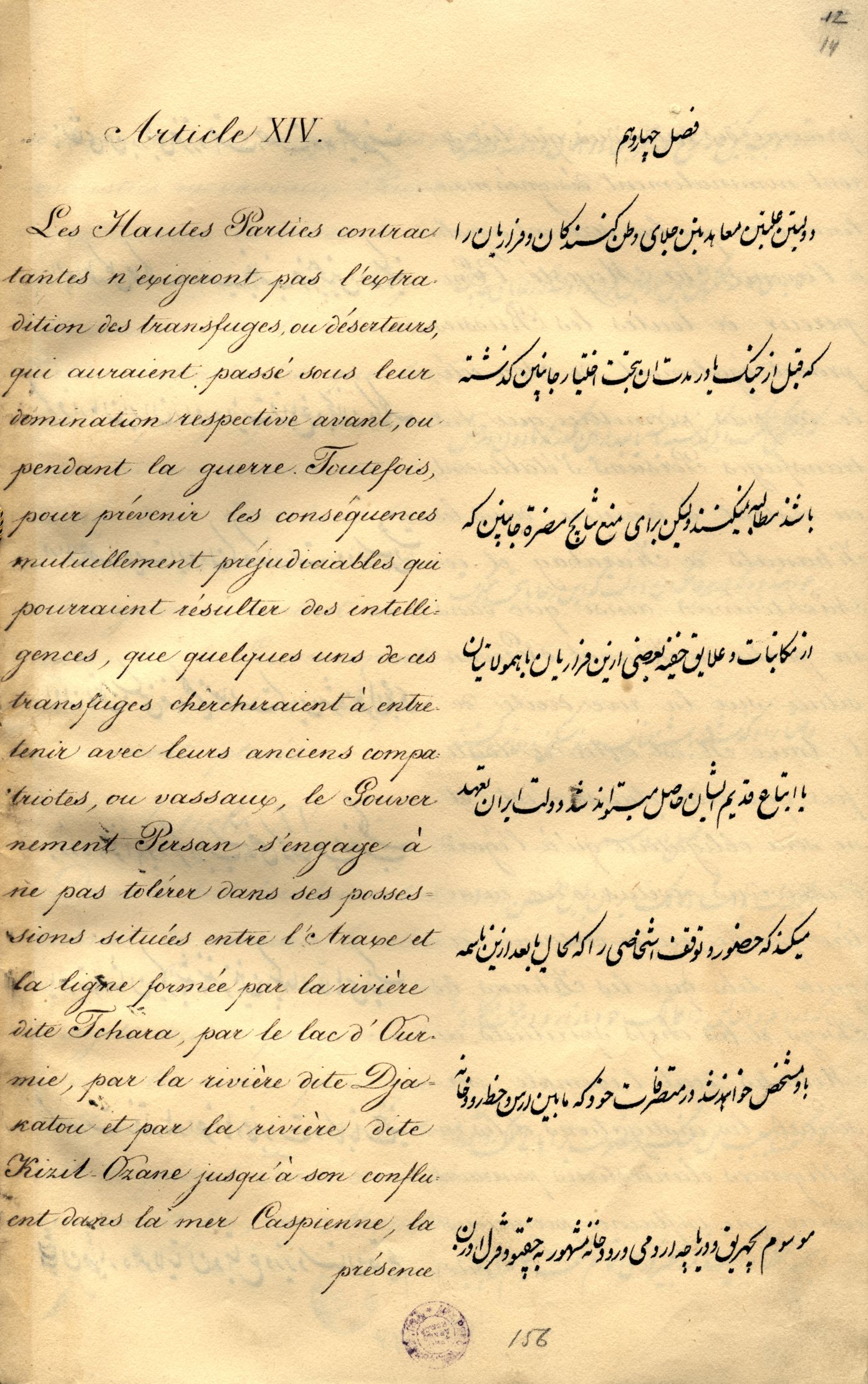
Treaty of Turkmenchay, which ended the Russian-Persian War of 1826

After the signing of the Turkmanchay Peace Treaty, a diplomatic mission headed by Alexander Griboyedov was sent to Persia in the autumn of 1828. In January 1829, Griboyedov conducted difficult negotiations with the Fath-Ali Shah Qajar in Tehran, during which he demanded from the Persian Shah the payment of the remaining debt, as well as the return of people captured during the war of 1826–1828. During these negotiations, 2 Armenian concubines ran to his temporary residence, and later the second eunuch of the Shah's harem, Yakub, whom Griboyedov took under his protection and hid in the residence.
Persian clergy, after Griboyedov sheltered the refugees, said that the Russian ambassadors had violated the laws of Islam and the precepts of Sharia, such statements were perceived by the Iranian population as a call to attack the Russian ambassadors and punish them for violating Iranian traditions.

== Massacre ==
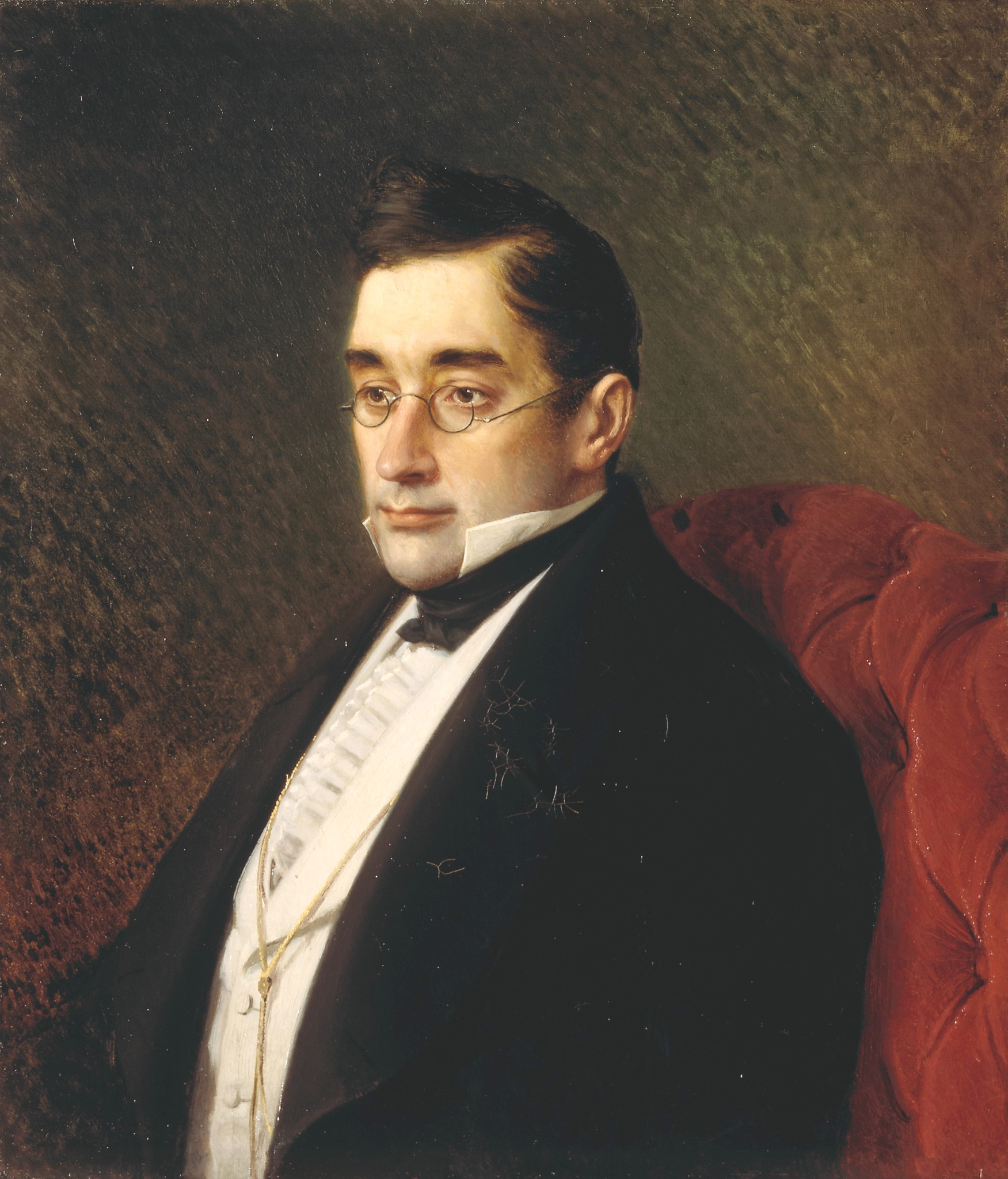
Famous Russian writer and diplomat Alexander Griboyedov

On January 30, an angry mob broke into the territory of the Russian residence. First, Yakub Mirza was killed, and two Armenian concubines were returned to their owners. After that, an increasing crowd attacked the house where the Russian embassy was staying. Alexander Griboyedov died after putting up a desperate resistance, killing 18 people along the way. His body was so mutilated that it was almost impossible to identify him. The Cossacks accompanying the diplomatic mission also died.

== Victims ==
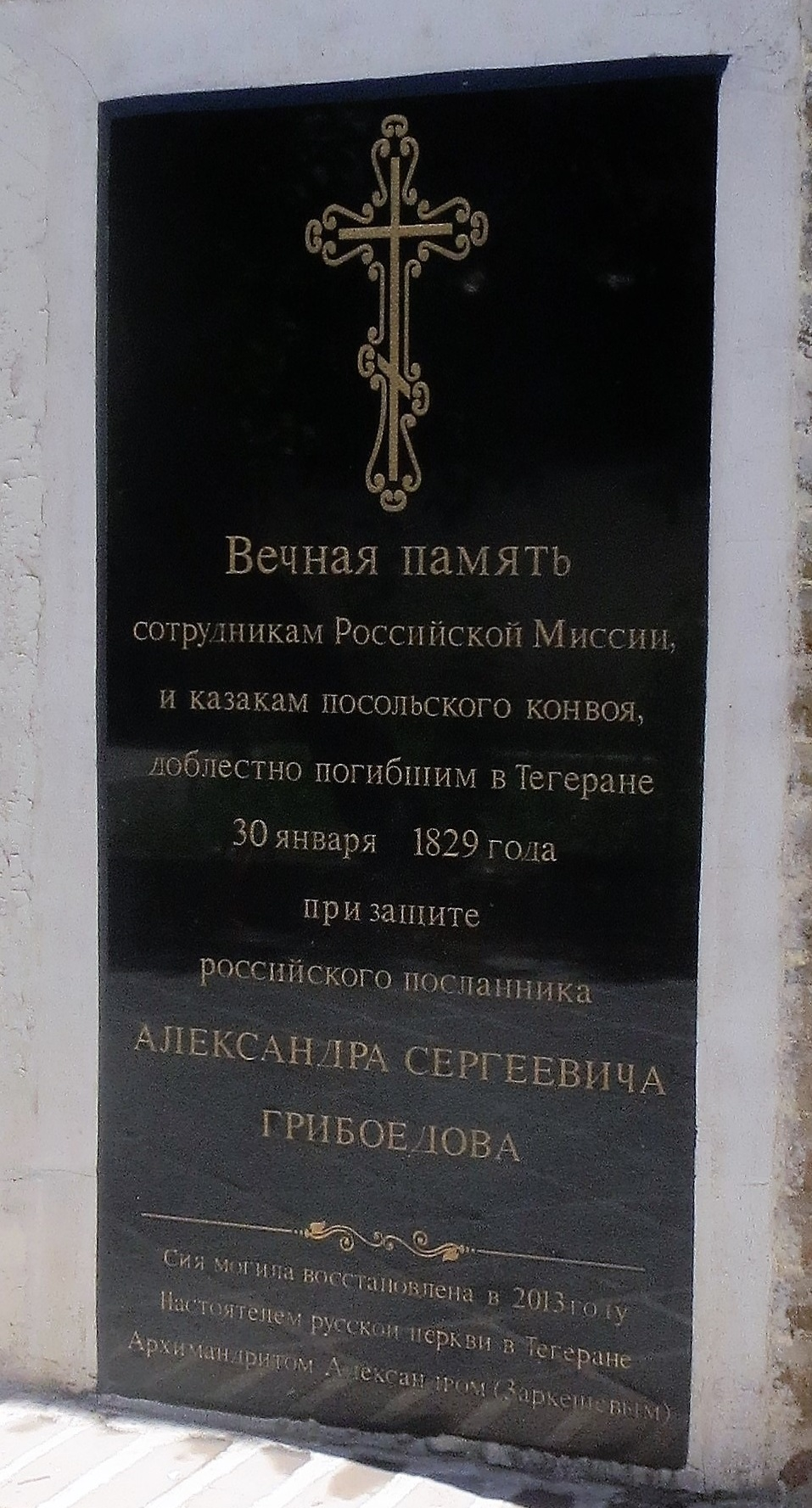
Memorial stone for A.S. Griboyedov in the Armenian St Thaddaeus Church, Tehran, Iran

- Alexander Griboyedov - A famous Russian writer and diplomat.
- Yakub Mirza - The second eunuch of the Fath-Ali Shah harem.
- Solomon Melikov - a collegiate assessor. The son of the sister of the chief eunuch of the Persian Shah Manuchehr Khan.

Even that day, 16 Cossacks, 30 servants, 5 members of the embassy were killed, not counting Griboyedov and Melikov.
