= Viktor Gayevski =

Russian literary critic and historian

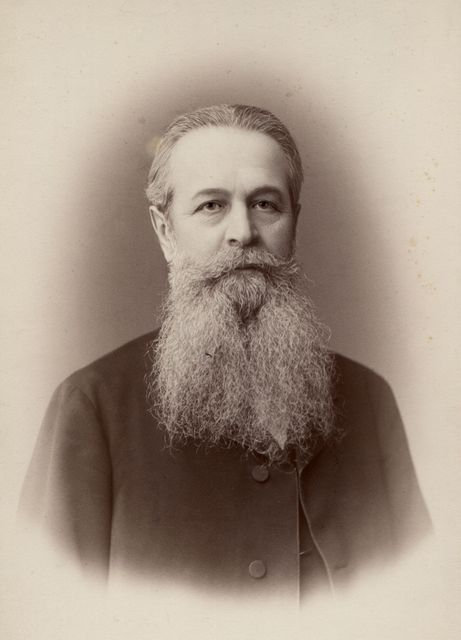
Viktor Gayevski (date unknown)

Viktor Pavlovich Gayevski Russian: Виктор Павлович Гаевский; (22 January 1826, Saint Petersburg – 2 March 1888, Saint Petersburg) was a Russian literary critic and historian. He also served as an attorney at the Regional Court of Justice.

== Biography ==
He was born to a noble family. His father, the translator Pavel Ivanovich Gayevski, was a long-term employee of the Ministry of National Education, under Sergey Uvarov. After graduating from the Imperial Alexander Lyceum in 1845, he began serving in a legal capacity at the Petitions Commission

In the early 1850s, he began associating with the writers from literary magazines such as Biblioteka Dlya Chteniya, Otechestvennye Zapiski, and Sovremennik (The Contemporary) . He would eventually work as an editor at the latter two, after publishing numerous articles and reviews. During this time, he married Elizaveta Polevaya, daughter of the editor and writer, Nikolai Polevoy. In the late 1850s, denunciations of an unspecified nature were directed against him, based on his relationship to Alexander Herzen, an early advocate of Socialism. He was forced to leave the commission and enter private practice.

Shortly after he became one of the founders of the "Общества для пособий нуждающимся литераторам и учёным", better known as "The Literary Fund" ("Литературный фонд"), an organization that offered financial support to needy writers. He would serve several terms as its chairman. Among the projects he undertook was a compilation of the letters of Ivan Turgenev (1887).

Following the judicial reform of Alexander II, he was able to serve as a public attorney again. In 1866, he was enrolled at the Saint Petersburg Court of Justice. One of his first cases involved defending Ivan Khudyakov, an associate of Nikolai Ishutin whose cousin, Dmitry Karakozov, had attempted to assassinate the Tsar. Khudyakov could have been executed, but Gayevski was able to get him exiled to Siberia instead. In 1873, he defended Fyodor Dostoevsky, who had been accused of violating the censorship laws while editing Гражданин (The Citizen). Dostoevsky was sentenced to two days in a military prison. For many years, Gayevski was a legal advisor to the State Bank of the Russian Empire.

In 1885, he was diagnosed with stomach cancer. He died after three years of "long and heavy suffering"; leaving behind a large collection of rare books and manuscripts.
