= Sevastopol plague uprising =

1830 rebellion in the Russian Empire

A popular uprising in Sevastopol in 1830 in response to strict quarantine measures imposed upon the city to combat the spread of what was considered the plague at the time, but was later identified as cholera.

== Beginnings ==
In 1828, there was a plague in the southern part of the Russian Empire, which was then at war with The Ottoman Empire. Even though there was no plague in Sevastopol, a quarantine was called as a preventative measure, likely due to the city's strategic importance as a port for the Russian Navy.

In May 1828, a quarantine cordon was built around Sevastopol, and all traffic into and out of the city had to pass through a checkpoint. In the summer of 1829, the quarantine was made stricter, such that anyone travelling to the city had to spend 2–3 weeks in the quarantine zone. Anybody suspected of illness had to be put into isolation. This dissuaded local farmers from entering the city with goods. This led to a shortage of rations, which was compounded by hoarding of goods by quarantine officials.

The deficit and poor quality of the goods in the city contributed to illness and death amongst the population, and the effects were the most pronounced in the poorer parts of the city.

Matters got so bad that an official commission was ordered from St. Petersburg to investigate the situation. Mass abuses were found, but no officials were punished and the commission was disbanded in November of that same year.

== Uprising ==
In March 1830, the quarantine was toughened further when all of the residents were ordered not to leave their homes. This ban was lifted in May, except for those residents of the poorer Korablenaya neighborhood, who were ordered to remain in quarantine for another 7 days, and upon passage of this week, for another 2 weeks. This enraged those residents, as well as their relations outside of the neighbourhood, and they refused the orders - despite the urging of Counter admiral Ivan Skalovsky and others in the military and religious establishment.

The quarantine was enforced by the infantry, and the desperate residents began planning an armed resistance, led by retired military amongst them. Many within the infantry sympathised with the residents. The two sides managed to avoid the outbreak of an armed confrontation.

On 3 June, Lt. General and Military Governor of Sevastopol, Nikolai Stolypin, in response to the growing instability, positioned troops in the streets and around the governor's mansion. This further incensed the revolting residents, who descended upon the governor's mansion in an angry mob and murdered Stolypin.

They were supported by the military garrisons deployed to enforce the quarantine, some of these soldiers tore down the quarantine cordon around the neighbourhood. The revolting citizens and soldiers held control of the city for 22 hours, during which time they ordered 'plague' officials to sign written documents stating that there was no plague in the city.

The next day Lt. Gen. Andrei Turchaninov replaced the murdered Stolypin and signed a decree ordering the end of the quarantine.

Despite accomplishing their immediate goal, the revolters did face repercussions when a division under Timofeyev arrived to regain control of the city. A committee under the governor of Novorossiya, Mikhail Semyonovich Vorontsov, considered the cases of about 6,000 people. 7 people were executed for leading the uprising and about 1,000 residents and sailors were sent to hard labor. Approximately 4,200 civilians were deported to other cities. The officers received disciplinary punishment.
