= Christine Rakhmanov =

Russian opera singer

Christine Rakhmanov (1760–1827) was a Russian stage actress and opera singer. She belonged to the first professional pioneer actresses in Russia.

Her background is unknown. She was married to her colleague Sergei Rakhmanov. She was engaged at the Karl Knipper Theatre in St. Petersburg in 1779, which automatically made her a member of the Imperial Theatres when the Karl Knipper Theatre was transferred to Imperial ownership in 1783. She retired in 1815. Christine Rakhmanov played the principal heroine roles at the Karl Knipper Theatre, and progressively came to earn great success in her roles as comical old women.
