= 1829 in Russia =

Events from the year 1829 in Russia

The Russo-Turkish War of 1828–1829 resulted from the Greek War of Independence of 1821–1829; war broke out after the Ottoman Sultan Mahmud II closed the Dardanelles to Russian ships and in November 1827 revoked the 1826 Akkerman Convention in retaliation for the participation of the Imperial Russian Navy in the Battle of Navarino of October 1827.

== Incumbents ==
- Monarch — Nicholas I
- Metropolitan and Archbishop of Moscow — Philaret Drozdov

== Events ==
- Mizur (Мизур), a rural settlement, founded
- January 30 (or February 11), In Tehran, Qajar Iran, members of the Russian Embassy and Armenian refugees were massacred by an anti-Russian mob. Deaths include the diplomat and playwright Alexander Griboyedev.
- February, Hans Karl Friedrich Anton Graf von Diebitsch und Narten (Russian: Ива́н Ива́нович Ди́бич-Забалка́нский) replaces Russian commander-in-chief Prince Peter Wittgenstein in a Russo-Turkish War
- 7 May, Diebitsch and 60,000 men cross the Danube to restart the siege of Silistra
- 30 May, Battle of Kulevitcha between Russia and Ottoman Empire
  - Russian victory
- 19 June, Silistra falls to Russians
- 12 September, Greek War of Independence results in Greek victory, Russia having supported Greece throughout the nine years of conflict.
- 14 September, Russo-Turkish War, sparked by the Greek War of Independence, ends in a Russian victory
  - Treaty of Adrianpole (also called Treaty of Edirne)
  - Occupation of Danubian Principalities

== Art and Literature ==
- Poltava ( Полтава) by Alexander Pushkin
  - Narrative poem on Cossack hetman Ivan Mazepa's involvement in the Battle of Poltava between Sweden and Russia that took place in 1709

== Births ==
- 13 August [O.S. 1] — Ivan Sechenov, psychologist, physiologist, medical scientist (d.1905)
- 29 October – Aleksandr Sokolov, painter (d. 2 December 1913)
- 28 November — Anton Rubinstein, pianist, composer (d.1894)

== Deaths ==
- Yekaterina von Engelhardt
- Maria Sinyavskaya
- Nikolai Ivanovich Argunov, painter, academician of Russian Academy of Arts (b.1771)
- 11 February — Alexander Griboyedov, playwright, diplomat (b.1795)
  - Killed by mob
- 28 September [O.S. 16] — Nikolay Raevsky, general and statesman (b.1771)
