= 1824 in Russia =

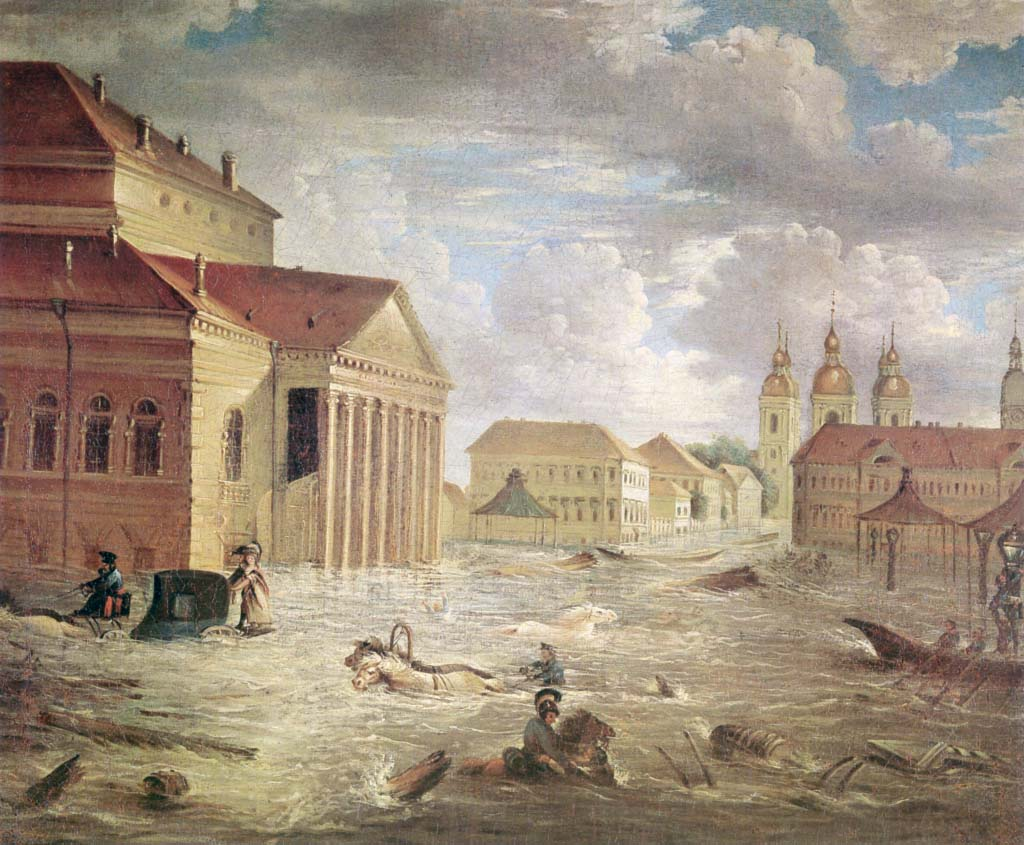
19 November 1824, in front of Bolshoi Theatre

Events from the year 1824 in Russia

== Incumbents ==
- Monarch – Alexander I

== Events ==
- Mnemozina first published
- Floods in Saint Petersburg which caused 300 casualties.
- Russia and the United States signed a treaty defining their spheres of influence in the Pacific Northwest of North America.
