= 1807 in Russia =

Events from the year 1807 in Russia

== Incumbents ==
- Monarch – Alexander I

== Events ==
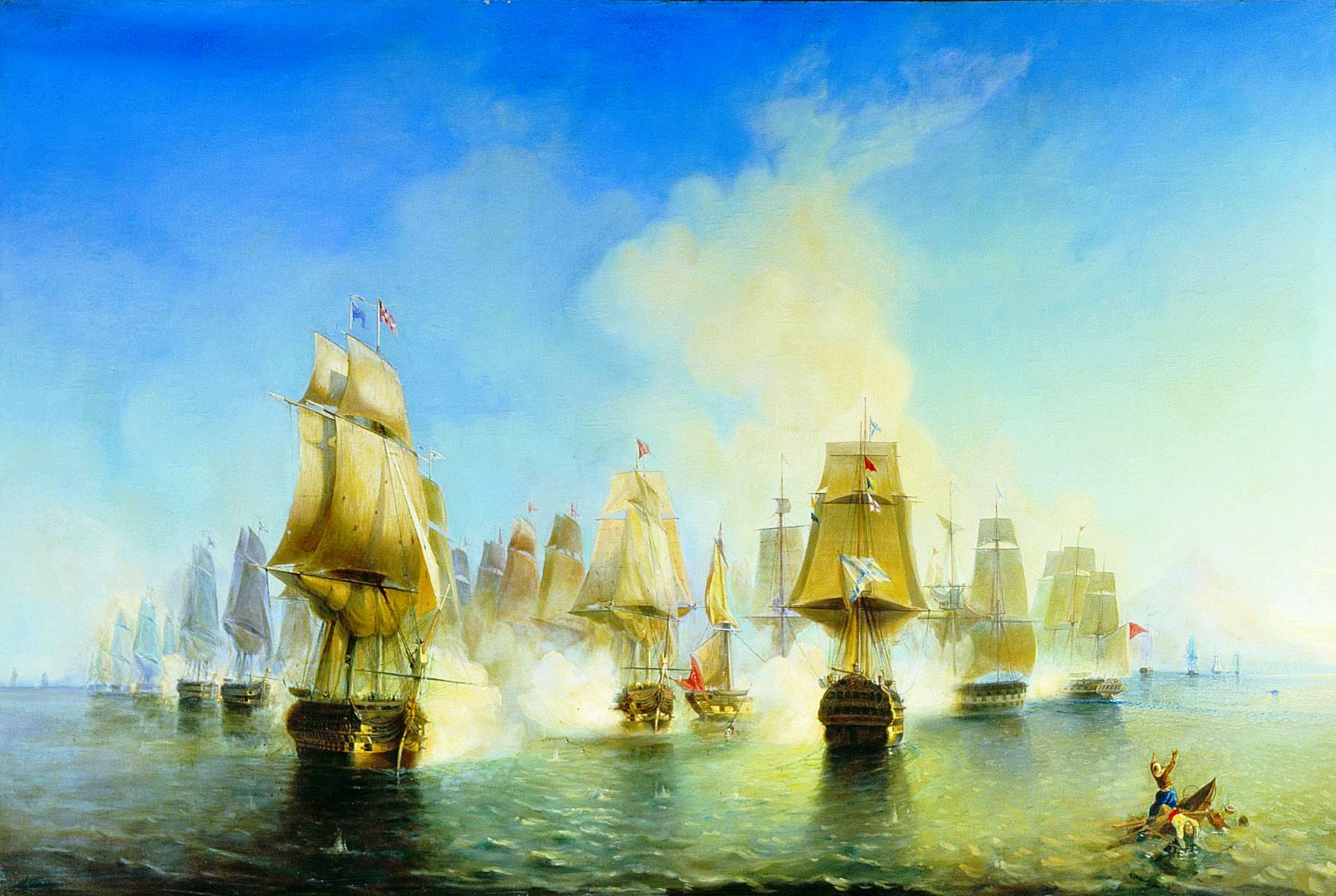
Battle of Athos 1807

- Russo-Persian War (1804–1813)
- War of the Fourth Coalition
  - February 3: Battle of Allenstein
  - February 7–8: Battle of Eylau
  - June 5–6: Battle of Guttstadt-Deppen
  - June 10: Battle of Heilsberg
  - June 14: Battle of Friedland
  - July 7 and 9: Treaties of Tilsit end war
- Russo-Turkish War (1806–1812)
  - May 22: Battle of the Dardanelles
  - June 18: Battle of Arpachai
  - July 1–2: Battle of Athos
- Anglo-Russian War (1807–1812) begins
  - October 26: Russia declares war
- Lovers of the Russian Word
- Kalashnikov Concern

== Births ==
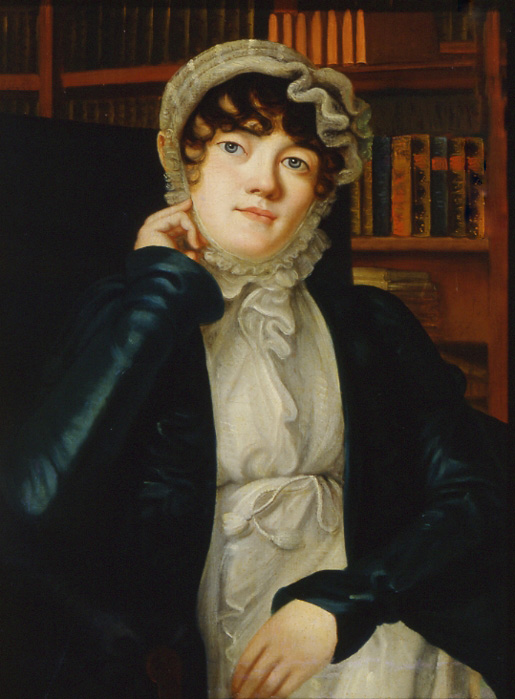
Karolina Pavlova

- Vladimir Benediktov, poet and translator (d. 1873)
- Ignatius Brianchaninov, Russian Orthodox bishop, theologian, and saint (d. 1867)
- Pyotr Grigoryevich Demidov, nobleman and general (d. 1862)
- Alexey Galakhov, writer, educator, and literary historian (d. 1892)
- Karolina Pavlova, poet and novelist (d. 1893)
- Vladimir Pecherin, nihilist, poet, priest (d. 1885)
- Nikolay Yakovlevich Rosenberg, chief manager of the Russian-American Company 1850-1853 (d. 1857)
- Kozma Spassky-Avtonomov, geographer, studied and wrote about Baku (d. 1890)
- Nikolai Stepanov, artist, caricaturist, and editor (d. 1877)
- Vladimir Titov, writer, statesman, diplomat (d. 1891)
- Otto Moritz von Vegesack, Baltic German diplomat (d. 1874)
- Semen Zhivago, painter (d. 1863)

== Deaths ==
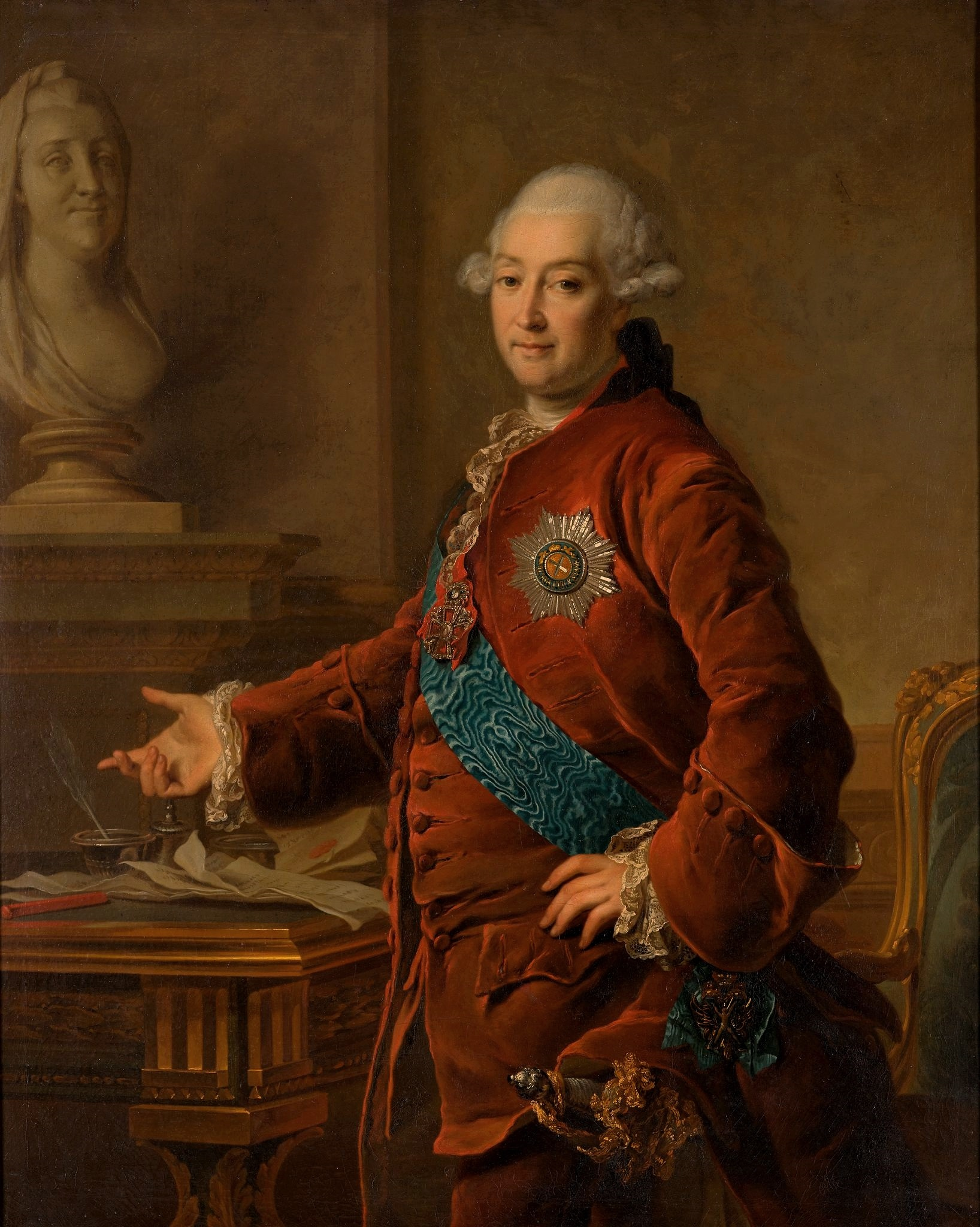
Alexander Mikhailovich Golitsyn (1772, Dmitry Levitsky)

- Pavel Dashkov, engineer (b. 1763)
- Pyotr Glebov-Streshnev, general (b. 1773)
- Alexander Mikhailovich Golitsyn, diplomat, philanthropist, art collector (b. 1723)
- Mikhail Kheraskov, poet and playwright (b. 1733)
- Avdotya Mikhaylova, actress and opera singer (b. 1746)
- Mikhail Nikitich Muravyov, poet and writer (b. 1757)
- Aleksey Okhotnikov, soldier and lover of Empress Elizabeth Alexeievna (b. 1780)
- Yakov Povalo-Shveikovsky, General of the Infantry, Privy Councillor (b. 1750)
- Ivan Rakhmaninov, publisher, translator of Voltaire (b. 1753)
- Nikolai Rezanov, statesman, ambassador to Japan, promoted Russian colonization of Alaska and California (b. 1764)
- Franciszek Smuglewicz, Polish/Lithuanian draughtsman, painter (b. 1745)
- Marko Voinovich, admiral (b. 1750)
