= Thuringia (disambiguation) =

Thuringia is a state in Germany. It may also refer to:

- Duchy of Thuringia, a frontier march of the Merovingian kingdom of Austrasia created around 631
- State of Thuringia (1920–1952), part of the Weimar Republic, Nazi Germany and East Germany
- SS Thuringia, various ships
- 934 Thüringia, an asteroid
