= 1754 in Russia =

- Decades: 1730s; 1740s; 1750s; 1760s; 1770s
- See also: History of Russia; Timeline of Russian history; List of years in Russia

Events from the year 1754 in Russia

== Incumbents ==
- Monarch – Elizabeth

== Events ==
- Construction of Anichkov Palace in Saint Petersburg, Russia
- Construction of Transfiguration Cathedral (Saint Petersburg)
- Construction of the city Oleksandriia in Kirovohrad Oblast
- Founding of the town Nizhnyaya Tura in the Sverdlovsk Oblast
- Decree abolishing internal customs (Elizabeth Romanova, decree ending in 1762)

== Births ==
- Unknown date – Alexandra Branitskaya, political activist, courtier and businessperson (d. 1838)
- 16 June – Salawat Yulayev, Bashkir poet and leader of Pugachev Rebellion against the Russian empire
- 29 June – Ivan Nikolajevich Rimsky-Korsakov, Russian courtier and lover of Catherine the Great
- October 1 (20 September O.S.) – Paul I of Russia (also known as Pavel Petrovich), Tsar of Russia until his death in 1801

== Deaths ==
- Unknown date – Maria Cantemir, Romanian noblewoman, Princess of Moldova, mistress of Peter the Great (who was the Emperor of Russia) aged 53–54 (b. 1700)
- 6 August – Georg Wilhelm Richmann, physicist. (b. 1711)
