= 966 Muschi =

Main-belt asteroid

Discovery
- Discovered by: W. Baade
- Discovery site: Bergedorf
- Discovery date: 9 November 1921

Designations
- Pronunciation: German: [ˈmʊʃi]
- Alternative designations: 1921 KU

Orbital characteristics
- Epoch 31 July 2016 (JD 2457600.5)
- Uncertainty parameter 0
- Observation arc: 91.69 yr (33489 days)
- Aphelion: 3.0752 AU (460.04 Gm)
- Perihelion: 2.3593 AU (352.95 Gm)
- Semi-major axis: 2.7173 AU (406.50 Gm)
- Eccentricity: 0.13172
- Orbital period (sidereal): 4.48 yr (1636.1 d)
- Mean anomaly: 215.68°
- Mean motion: 0° 13^{m} 12.144^{s} / day
- Inclination: 14.411°
- Longitude of ascending node: 72.437°
- Argument of perihelion: 178.311°

Physical characteristics
- Mean radius: 11.715±0.55 km
- Synodic rotation period: 5.355 h (0.2231 d)
- Geometric albedo: 0.3497±0.035
- Absolute magnitude (H): 9.91

966 Muschi is a main belt asteroid. It was discovered on 9 November 1921 by the German astronomer Walter Baade out of the Hamburger Sternwarte. Baade named the asteroid after his wife's nickname.
