= 5656 Oldfield =

Asteroid

Discovery
- Discovered by: W. Baade
- Discovery site: Bergedorf Obs.
- Discovery date: 8 October 1920

Designations
- Named after: Mike Oldfield (English musician)
- Alternative designations: A920 TA · 1978 WW_{18} 1981 JZ_{5}
- Minor planet category: main-belt · (inner) background

Orbital characteristics
- Epoch 23 March 2018 (JD 2458200.5)
- Uncertainty parameter 0
- Observation arc: 97.29 yr (35,536 d)
- Aphelion: 3.1076 AU
- Perihelion: 1.8111 AU
- Semi-major axis: 2.4594 AU
- Eccentricity: 0.2636
- Orbital period (sidereal): 3.86 yr (1,409 d)
- Mean anomaly: 125.66°
- Mean motion: 0° 15^{m} 19.8^{s} / day
- Inclination: 4.0144°
- Longitude of ascending node: 248.67°
- Argument of perihelion: 83.725°

Physical characteristics
- Mean diameter: 7.691±0.051 km
- Geometric albedo: 0.075±0.009
- Absolute magnitude (H): 14.1

5656 Oldfield, provisional designation A920 TA, is a background asteroid from the inner regions of the asteroid belt, approximately 7.7 kilometers (4.8 miles) in diameter. It was discovered on 8 October 1920, by astronomer Walter Baade at the Bergedorf Observatory in Hamburg, Germany. The asteroid was named for English musician Mike Oldfield.

== Orbit and classification ==
Oldfield is a non-family asteroid of the main belt's background population. It orbits the Sun in the inner main-belt at a distance of 1.8–3.1 AU once every 3 years and 10 months (1,409 days; semi-major axis of 2.46 AU). Its orbit has an eccentricity of 0.26 and an inclination of 4° with respect to the ecliptic.

The body's observation arc begins at Bergedorf two nights after its official discovery observation.

== Physical characteristics ==
=== Diameter and albedo ===
According to the survey carried out by the NEOWISE mission of NASA's Wide-field Infrared Survey Explorer, Oldfield measures 7.691 kilometers in diameter and its surface has an albedo of 0.075.

=== Rotation period ===
As of 2018, no rotational lightcurve of Oldfield has been obtained from photometric observations. The body's rotation period, poles and shape remain unknown.

== Naming ==
This minor planet was named after English composer and multi-instrumentalist Mike Oldfield (born 1953), creator of the famed Tubular Bells albums. The official naming citation was proposed by Gareth V. Williams and published by the Minor Planet Center on 25 April 1994 (M.P.C. 23353).
