= Rümker =

Rümker may refer to:

- Carl Ludwig Christian Rümker (1788–1862), German astronomer
- Georg Friedrich Wilhelm Rümker (1832–1900), German astronomer born in Hamburg, son of Carl Ludwig Christian Rümker
- Mons Rümker, an isolated volcanic formation that is located in the northwest part of the Moon's near side
