= 967 Helionape =

Main belt asteroid

Discovery
- Discovered by: W. Baade
- Discovery site: Bergedorf
- Discovery date: 9 November 1921

Designations
- Pronunciation: /hiːliˈɒnəpiː/
- Alternative designations: 1921 KV; A922 AB

Orbital characteristics
- Epoch 31 July 2016 (JD 2457600.5)
- Uncertainty parameter 0
- Observation arc: 91.53 yr (33433 days)
- Aphelion: 2.5998 AU (388.92 Gm)
- Perihelion: 1.8516 AU (277.00 Gm)
- Semi-major axis: 2.2257 AU (332.96 Gm)
- Eccentricity: 0.16807
- Orbital period (sidereal): 3.32 yr (1212.8 d)
- Mean anomaly: 278.852°
- Mean motion: 0° 17^{m} 48.552^{s} / day
- Inclination: 5.4125°
- Longitude of ascending node: 82.358°
- Argument of perihelion: 231.930°

Physical characteristics
- Mean radius: 5.985±0.5 km
- Synodic rotation period: 3.234 h (0.1348 d)
- Geometric albedo: 0.1782±0.034
- Absolute magnitude (H): 11.8

967 Helionape is an asteroid belonging to the Flora family of Main Belt asteroids. It was discovered by German astronomer Walter Baade at Hamburg Observatory on November 9, 1921, and was named after the Austrian theatrical actor Adolf von Sonnenthal. This object is orbiting the Sun at a distance of 2.23 AU with a period of 3.32 years and an eccentricity of 0.168. The orbital plane is inclined at an angle of 5.4° to the ecliptic.

Its diameter is about 12 km and it has an albedo of 0.178. Photometric observations in 2007 generated a light curve showing a rotation period of 3.234±0.002 h. The brightness amplitude during the measured period was 0.058±0.005 magnitude.
