= 930 Westphalia =

Main-belt asteroid

Discovery
- Discovered by: W. Baade
- Discovery site: Bergedorf Obs.
- Discovery date: 10 March 1920

Designations
- Pronunciation: /wɛstˈfeɪliə/
- Named after: Westphalia (German region)
- Alternative designations: A920 EE · 1920 GS; A916 DD · 1916 DD
- Minor planet category: main-belt · (inner) background · slow

Orbital characteristics
- Epoch 31 May 2020 (JD 2459000.5)
- Uncertainty parameter 0
- Observation arc: 99.58 yr (36,370 d)
- Aphelion: 2.7792 AU
- Perihelion: 2.0828 AU
- Semi-major axis: 2.4310 AU
- Eccentricity: 0.1432
- Orbital period (sidereal): 3.79 yr (1,384 d)
- Mean anomaly: 32.395°
- Mean motion: 0° 15^{m} 36^{s} / day
- Inclination: 15.336°
- Longitude of ascending node: 340.94°
- Argument of perihelion: 329.98°

Physical characteristics
- Mean diameter: 34.922±0.153 km; 36.48±1.4 km; 39.51±1.47 km
- Synodic rotation period: 100.66±0.12 h
- Geometric albedo: 0.031±0.002; 0.0366±0.003; 0.040±0.007
- Spectral type: SMASS = Ch
- Absolute magnitude (H): 11.2; 11.3

930 Westphalia (prov. designation: A920 EE or 1920 GS) is a very dark background asteroid and a slow rotator from the inner regions of the asteroid belt, that measures approximately 36 kilometers (22 miles) in diameter. It was discovered on 10 March 1920, by German astronomer Walter Baade at the Bergedorf Observatory in Hamburg. The carbonaceous C-type asteroid (Ch) has an exceptionally long rotation period of 100.7 hours and is likely spherical in shape. It was named after Westphalia, a region in northwestern Germany.

== Orbit and classification ==
Westphalia is a non-family asteroid of the main belt's background population when applying the hierarchical clustering method to its proper orbital elements. It orbits the Sun in the inner asteroid belt at a distance of 2.1–2.8 AU once every 3 years and 9 months (1,384 days; semi-major axis of 2.43 AU). Its orbit has an eccentricity of 0.14 and an inclination of 15° with respect to the ecliptic. The asteroid was first observed as A916 DD (1916 DD) at the Simeiz Observatory on 24 February 1916. The body's observation arc begins with its official discovery observation at Bergedorf Observatory on 10 March 1920.

== Naming ==
This minor planet was named after the region of Westphalia in northwestern Germany, bordering the Netherlands and the Rhine river. It is the birthplace of the discoverer Walter Baade (1893–1960). The naming was mentioned in The Names of the Minor Planets by Paul Herget in 1955 (H 90).

== Physical characteristics ==
In the Bus–Binzel SMASS classification, Westphalia is a hydrated carbonaceous C-type asteroid (Ch).

=== Rotation period ===
In April 2015, a rotational lightcurve of Westphalia was obtained from photometric observations by Eduardo Manuel Álvarez at the Los Algarrobos Observatory (I38) in Uruguay. Lightcurve analysis gave a rotation period of 100.66±0.12 hours with a brightness amplitude of 0.15±0.02 magnitude, indicative of a spherical, non-elongated shape (U=2). This was the first time a period could be determined for this asteroid, and, as the observer noted, there were only 18 tree-digit asteroids left for which no such measurement had yet been made. With a period above 100 hours, Westphalia is a slow rotator. While the slowest rotators have periods above 1000 hours, the vast majority of asteroids have periods between 2.2 and 20 hours.

=== Diameter and albedo ===
According to the survey carried out by the NEOWISE mission of NASA's Wide-field Infrared Survey Explorer (WISE), the Infrared Astronomical Satellite IRAS, and the Japanese Akari satellite, Westphalia measures (34.922±0.153), (36.48±1.4) and (39.51±1.47) kilometers in diameter and its surface has a very low albedo of (0.040±0.007), (0.0366±0.003) and (0.031±0.002), respectively.

The Collaborative Asteroid Lightcurve Link derives an albedo of 0.0438 and a diameter of 36.53 km based on an absolute magnitude of 11.2. Further published mean-diameters and albedos by the WISE team in ascending order include (35.34±1.13 km), (35.602±0.157 km), (35.896±10.36 km), (38.107±12.56 km), (38.502±10.778 km) and (44.522±0.240 km) and albedos of (0.031±0.021), (0.0312±0.0240), (0.032±0.001), (0.0373±0.0253), (0.0384±0.0059) and (0.04±0.01).
