= 934 Thüringia =

Main-belt asteroid

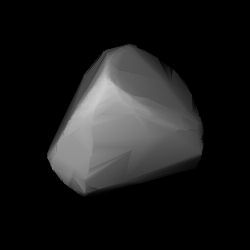
- Modelled shape of Thüringia from its lightcurve

Discovery
- Discovered by: W. Baade
- Discovery site: Bergedorf Obs.
- Discovery date: 15 August 1920

Designations
- Pronunciation: /θɜːˈrɪndʒiə/
- Named after: Thuringia; SS Thuringia; (German state and ship)
- Alternative designations: A920 PA · 1920 HK; 1952 OP · 1974 HP_{3}
- Minor planet category: main-belt · (middle); background

Orbital characteristics
- Epoch 31 May 2020 (JD 2459000.5)
- Uncertainty parameter 0
- Observation arc: 98.68 yr (36,042 d)
- Aphelion: 3.3473 AU
- Perihelion: 2.1546 AU
- Semi-major axis: 2.7509 AU
- Eccentricity: 0.2168
- Orbital period (sidereal): 4.56 yr (1,667 d)
- Mean anomaly: 273.96°
- Mean motion: 0° 12^{m} 57.6^{s} / day
- Inclination: 14.076°
- Longitude of ascending node: 325.40°
- Argument of perihelion: 64.133°

Physical characteristics
- Mean diameter: 53.35±5.2 km; 53.714±0.361 km; 58.00±0.70 km
- Synodic rotation period: 8.166±0.006 h
- Pole ecliptic latitude: (120.0°, −52.0°) (λ_{1}/β_{1})
- Geometric albedo: 0.041±0.001; 0.047±0.006; 0.0471±0.011
- Spectral type: SMASS = Ch
- Absolute magnitude (H): 10.1

934 Thüringia (prov. designation: A920 PA or 1920 HK) is a dark background asteroid, approximately 54 kilometers (34 miles) in diameter, located in the central region of the asteroid belt. It was discovered on 15 August 1920, by astronomer Walter Baade at the Bergedorf Observatory in Hamburg, Germany. The hydrated C-type asteroid has a rotation period of 8.2 hours and is likely irregular in shape. It was named after the German state of Thuringia. The naming was inspired by the ocean liner SS Thuringia.

== Orbit and classification ==
Thüringia is a non-family asteroid of the main belt's background population when applying the hierarchical clustering method to its proper orbital elements. It orbits the Sun in the central asteroid belt at a distance of 2.2–3.3 AU once every 4 years and 7 months (1,667 days; semi-major axis of 2.75 AU). Its orbit has an eccentricity of 0.22 and an inclination of 14° with respect to the ecliptic. The body's observation arc begins at the Vienna Observatory on 2 September 1920, or 18 nights after its official discovery observation at Hamburg Observatory.

== Naming ==
This minor planet was named after the German state of Thuringia (German: Thüringen). The naming was proposed by the captain of the ocean liner SS Thuringia, which was a ship in the fleet of the Hamburg America Line, on which the discoverer, Walter Baade, travelled twice on his visits to New York in the 1920s. As the captain of the SS Thuringia was an amateur astronomer, he was invited by Baade to name one of his discoveries. The naming was mentioned in The Names of the Minor Planets by Paul Herget in 1955 (H 90).

== Physical characteristics ==
In the Bus–Binzel SMASS classification, Thüringia is a hydrated, carbonaceous C-type asteroid (Ch).

=== Rotation period and pole ===
In October 1998, a rotational lightcurve of Thüringia was obtained from photometric observations by astronomers of the Minnesota State University Moorhead at Paul Feder Observatory. Analysis of the classically shaped bimodal lightcurve gave a well-defined rotation period of 8.166±0.006 hours with a high brightness variation of 0.66±0.03 magnitude, indicative of an irregular, non-spherical shape (U=3). In October 2007, another period determination by Federico Manzini, Hiromi Hamanowa and Hiroko Hamanowa determined a period of 8.16446±0.00006 hours and an amplitude of 0.52±0.01 magnitude (U=3). In 2011, a modeled lightcurve using data from the Uppsala Asteroid Photometric Catalogue (UAPC) and other sources gave a sidereal period 8.16534 hours, as well as a spin axis of (120.0°, −52.0°) in ecliptic coordinates (λ, β) (U=2).

=== Diameter and albedo ===
According to the survey carried out by the Infrared Astronomical Satellite IRAS, the NEOWISE mission of NASA's Wide-field Infrared Survey Explorer (WISE), and the Japanese Akari satellite, Thüringia measures (53.35±5.2), (53.714±0.361) and (58.00±0.70) kilometers in diameter and its surface has a low albedo of (0.0471±0.011), (0.047±0.006) and (0.041±0.001), respectively.

The Collaborative Asteroid Lightcurve Link derives an albedo of 0.0564 and a diameter of 53.45 km based on an absolute magnitude of 10.1. Further published mean-diameters and albedos by the WISE team include (49.91±14.77 km), (50.24±13.36 km), (53.310±14.66 km), (53.333±18.03 km) and (62.572±1.232 km) with corresponding albedos of (0.06±0.04), (0.05±0.04), (0.0501±0.0465), (0.0528±0.0460), and (0.0342±0.0200).
