= Walter Baade =

German astronomer (1893–1960)

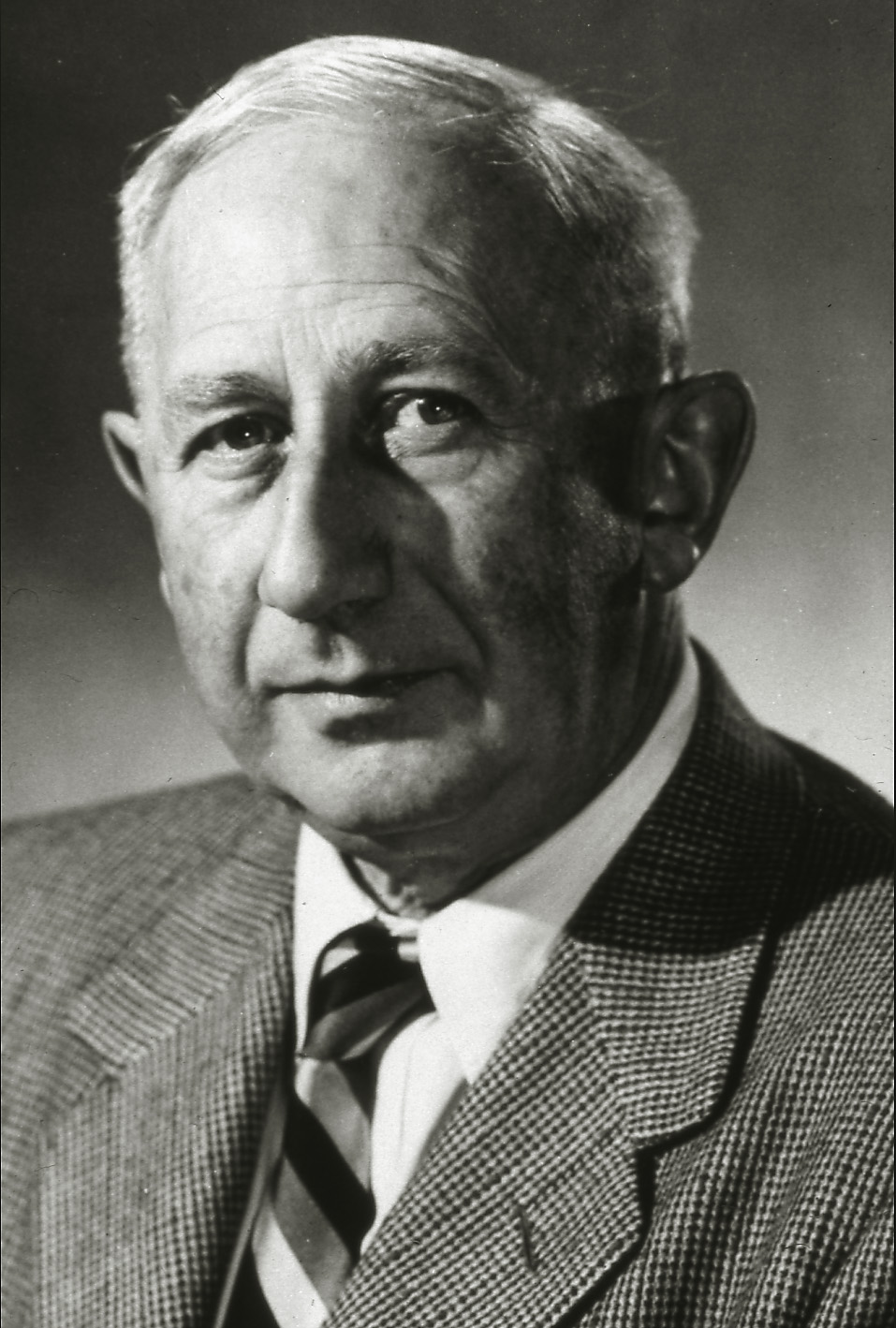
- Baade, c. 1950
- Born: Wilhelm Heinrich Walter Baade; March 24, 1893; Schröttinghausen, Prussia, German Empire
- Died: June 25, 1960 (aged 67); Göttingen, Lower Saxony, West Germany
- Citizenship: German
- Education: University of Göttingen
- Known for: Coined the term "supernova" and "neutron star" with Fritz Zwicky
- Awards: Bruce Medal 1955
- Scientific career
- Fields: Astronomy
- Workplaces: Hamburg-Bergedorf Observatory, Mt. Wilson, Palomar Observatory
- Doctoral students: Halton Arp; Allan Sandage

Wilhelm Heinrich Walter Baade (March 24, 1893 – June 25, 1960) was a German astronomer who worked in the United States from 1931 to 1959.

== Early life and education ==
Baade was born as the son of a teacher in Prussia, Germany. He finished school in 1912. He then studied maths, physics and astronomy at the universities of Münster and Göttingen. He received his PhD in 1919.

== Career ==
Baade worked at Hamburg Observatory at Bergedorf from 1919 to 1931. In 1920 he discovered 944 Hidalgo, the first of a class of minor planets now called Centaurs which cross the orbits of giant planets.

From 1931 to 1958, he worked at Mount Wilson Observatory in Los Angeles, California.

In 1937, the University of Hamburg wanted Baade as successor of Richard Schorr for the Hamburg Observatory, but he refused.

During World War II, while working at Mount Wilson Observatory, Baade took advantage of wartime blackout conditions (which reduced light pollution), to resolve stars in the center of the Andromeda Galaxy for the first time. These observations led him to define distinct "populations" for stars (Population I and Population II). The same observations led him to discover that there are two types of Cepheid variable stars. Using this discovery he recalculated the size of the known universe, doubling the previous calculation made by Edwin Hubble in 1929. He announced this finding to considerable astonishment at the 1952 meeting of the International Astronomical Union in Rome.

Together with Fritz Zwicky, he identified supernovae as a new category of astronomical objects. Zwicky and he also proposed the existence of neutron stars, and suggested supernovae might create them.

Beginning in 1952, he and Rudolph Minkowski identified the optical counterparts of various radio sources, including Cygnus A. He discovered 10 asteroids, including 944 Hidalgo, which has a long orbital period (it is actually the first centaur ever discovered, although they were not recognized as a distinct dynamical class until 1977); the Apollo-class 1566 Icarus, the perihelion of which is closer than that of Mercury; and the Amor-type 1036 Ganymed.

== Personal life ==
He died in 1960 in Göttingen, West Germany.

== Honors ==
Asteroids discovered: 10
930 Westphalia	March 10, 1920
934 Thüringia	August 15, 1920
944 Hidalgo	October 31, 1920
966 Muschi	November 9, 1921
967 Helionape	November 9, 1921
1036 Ganymed	October 23, 1924
1103 Sequoia	November 9, 1928
1566 Icarus	June 27, 1949
5656 Oldfield	October 8, 1920
7448 Pöllath	January 14, 1948

Awards

- Foreign membership of the Royal Netherlands Academy of Arts and Sciences (1953)
- Elected Member of the American Philosophical Society (1953).
- Gold Medal of the Royal Astronomical Society (1954)
- Bruce Medal (1955)
- Henry Norris Russell Lectureship of the American Astronomical Society (1958)

Named after him

- Asteroid 1501 Baade
- The crater Baade on the Moon
- Vallis Baade, a vallis (valley) on the Moon
- One of the two Magellan telescopes
- The asteroid 966 Muschi, after his wife's nickname

== See also ==
- Baade's Window, an observational area he identified in the 1940s as being relatively free of dust that presents a view of the Galactic Center in Sagittarius
- Baade's Star, now known as the Crab Pulsar, was first identified as being directly associated with the Crab Nebula by him.
- Baade-Wesselink method, a method for determining the distance of a Cepheid variable star
