= 1036 Ganymed =

Stony near-Earth asteroid

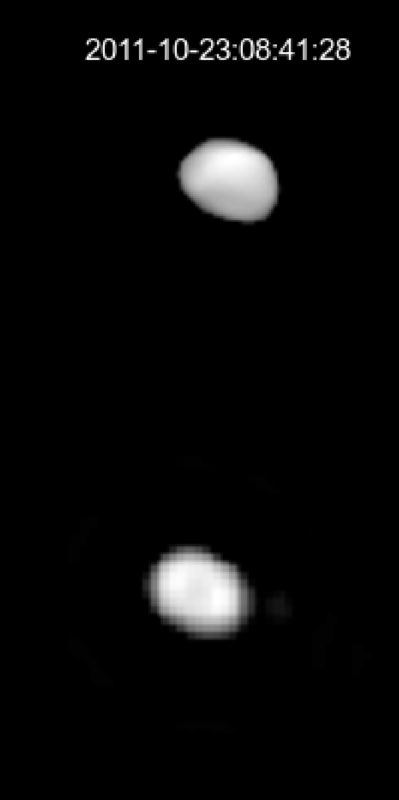
- A three-dimensional model of 1036 Ganymed based on its lightcurve on the top and an image of 1036 Ganymed on the bottom.

Discovery
- Discovered by: W. Baade
- Discovery site: Bergedorf Obs.
- Discovery date: 23 October 1924

Designations
- Pronunciation: /ˈɡænəmɛd/
- Named after: Ganymede (Greek mythology)
- Alternative designations: 1924 TD · 1952 BF; 1954 HH
- Minor planet category: Amor · NEO
- Adjectives: Ganymedean /ɡænəˈmiːdiən/

Orbital characteristics
- Epoch 21 November 2025 (JD 2461000.5)
- Uncertainty parameter 0
- Observation arc: 100.96 yr (36,876 d)
- Aphelion: 4.0860 AU
- Perihelion: 1.2440 AU
- Semi-major axis: 2.6650 AU
- Eccentricity: 0.5332
- Orbital period (sidereal): 4.35 yr (1,589 d)
- Mean anomaly: 97.59°
- Mean motion: 0° 13^{m} 35.4^{s} / day
- Inclination: 26.681°
- Longitude of ascending node: 215.44°
- Argument of perihelion: 132.50°
- Earth MOID: 0.3433 AU (134 LD)
- Mars MOID: 0.0310 AU

Physical characteristics
- Dimensions: 39.3 km × 18.9 km
- Mean diameter: 38±3 km
- Synodic rotation period: 10.31304 h
- Pole ecliptic longitude: 198° ± 10°
- Pole ecliptic latitude: −79° ± 1°
- Geometric albedo: 0.238; 0.243; 0.2926
- Spectral type: Tholen = S SMASS = S S U–B = 0.417; B–V = 0.882±0.008; V–R = 0.515±0.004; V–I = 0.981±0.005
- Absolute magnitude (H): 9.45; 9.50

1036 Ganymed, provisional designation 1924 TD, is a stony asteroid on a highly eccentric orbit, classified as a near-Earth object of the Amor group. It was discovered by German astronomer Walter Baade at the Bergedorf Observatory in Hamburg on 23 October 1924, and named after Ganymede from Greek mythology. With a diameter of approximately 35 kilometers (22 miles), Ganymed is the largest of all near-Earth objects but does not cross Earth's orbit. The S-type asteroid has a rotation period of 10.3 hours.

== Orbit and classification ==
Orbit of Ganymed (blue), with the inner planets and Jupiter (outermost).

Ganymed is an Amor asteroid, a subgroup of the near-Earth asteroids that approach the orbit of Earth from beyond, but do not cross it. It orbits the Sun at a distance of 1.2–4.1 AU about once every 4 years and 4 months (i.e., 52 months or 1,589 days; semi-major axis of 2.66 AU). Its orbit has a high eccentricity of 0.53 and an inclination of 27° with respect to the ecliptic.

=== Close approaches ===
==== Earth approach ====
Ganymed has a minimum orbit intersection distance with Earth of 0.343339 AU (51,000,000 km), or 134 lunar distance.

==== Mars approach ====
Due to the high eccentricity of its orbit, Ganymed is also a Mars-crosser, intersecting the orbit of the Red Planet. On 16 December 2176 (150 years' time), it will pass at a distance of 0.02868 AU (4,290,000 km; 2,670,000 mi) from Mars.

== Name ==
The minor planet of Ganymed was named after Ganymede from Greek mythology, using the German spelling ("Ganymed"). Ganymede was a Trojan prince abducted by Zeus to serve as a cup-bearer to the Greek gods. The name had previously also been given to Jupiter's third moon, "Ganymede", which was discovered in 1610 by Italian astronomer Galileo Galilei.

== Physical characteristics ==
Owing to its early discovery date, Ganymed has a rich observational history. A 1931 paper published the absolute magnitude, based on observations to date, as 9.24, slightly brighter than the present value of 9.45.

Ganymed is a stony S-type asteroid, in the Tholen, SMASS and in the S3OS2 taxonomy. This means that it is relatively reflective and composed of iron and magnesium silicates. Spectral measurements put Ganymed in the S (VI) spectral subtype, indicating a surface rich in orthopyroxenes, and possibly metals (although if metals are present they are covered and not readily apparent in the spectra).

=== Diameter and albedo ===
According to the surveys carried out by the Infrared Astronomical Satellite IRAS, the Japanese Akari satellite and the NEOWISE mission of NASA's Wide-field Infrared Survey Explorer (WISE), Ganymed measures between 31.66 and 37.67 kilometers in diameter and its surface has an albedo between 0.238 and 0.293.

The Collaborative Asteroid Lightcurve Link derives an albedo of 0.2809 and a mean-diameter of 31.57 kilometers based on an absolute magnitude of 9.50. Carry published a diameter 34.28±1.38 kilometers in 2012.

An occultation of a star by Ganymed was observed from California on 22 August 1985. Additional observations in 2011 gave an occultation cross-section with a semi-major and minor axis of 39.3 and 18.9 kilometers, respectively.

=== Rotation and poles ===
A large number of rotational lightcurves of Ganymed have been obtained from photometric observations since 1985. Analysis of the best-rated lightcurves obtained by American photometrist Frederick Pilcher at his Organ Mesa Observatory (G50) in New Mexico during 2011 gave a rotation period of 10.297 hours with a consolidated brightness amplitude between 0.28 and 0.31 magnitude (U=3-/3/3).

Three studies using modeled photometric data from the Uppsala Asteroid Photometric Catalogue, WISE thermal infrared data and other sources, gave a concurring period of 10.313, 10.31284, and 10.31304 hours, respectively. Each modeled lightcurve also determined two spin axes of (214.0°, −73.0°), (190.0°, −78.0°), as well as (198.0°, −79.0°) in ecliptic coordinates (λ, β; L1/B1), respectively.

In 1998, radar observations of Ganymed by the Arecibo radio telescope produced images of the asteroid, revealing a roughly spherical object. Polarimetric observations conducted by Japanese astronomers concluded that there was a weak correlation between the object's light- and polarimetry curve as a function of rotation angle. Because polarization is dependent on surface terrain and composition, rather than the observed size of the object like the lightcurve, this suggests that the surface features of the asteroid are roughly uniform over its observed surface.
