= 1753 in Russia =

== Incumbents ==
- Monarch – Elizabeth

== Event ==
- Stroganov Palace started construction
- Slavo-Serbia was formed

== Birth ==
- Pyotr Lopukhin, Russian politician
- Nikolai Sergeevich Volkonsky, military leader
- Matvei Platov, General of the Imperial Russian Army
- Ivan Rakhmaninov, Russian publisher

== Death ==
- Georg Wilhelm Richmann, Russian physicist
