= SS Thuringia =

Four steamships operated by Hamburg-Amerikanische Packetfahrt Aktien-Gesellschaft carried the name Thuringia.

- SS Thuringia (1869), sold in 1878 to Russia
- SS Thuringia (1880), abandoned in 1897, later sold by underwriters
- SS Thuringia (1904), in service 1906–14, seized by Uruguay
- SS Thuringia (1922), in service 1923–30, renamed General San Martin

Other ships named Thuringia were

- SS Thuringia (1900), a 1,420 GRT ship
- SS Thuringia (1933), a 399 GRT trawler built by Cochrane & Sons, Selby as Rockflower.
