= Geographic Society in Hamburg =

The Geographic Society in Hamburg (German: Geographische Gesellschaft in Hamburg, GGH) is a non-profit, educational institution based in Hamburg whose aims is to establish and maintain connections between science with the state and the economy as well as society more generally.

For years the city's first mayor also acted as president of the Geographical Society at the same time. The Institute of Geography of the University of Hamburg regularly hosts lectures delivered by the GGH. Along with the Hamburg Colonial Institute, founded in 1908, it helped prepare the way for the establishment of the University of Hamburg in 1919.

== Foundation ==
The society was founded in 1873 as organisation to promote geography in Hamburg, Germany. The first Annual Report, Jahresbericht der Geographischen Gesellschaft was published for 1873–4. Gustav Heinrich Kirchenpauer was the original president, with Ludwig Friedrichsen as the first secretary and Georg Friedrich Wilhelm Rümker as second secretary. There were 228 members at the end of March 1874, Otto Moritz von Vegesack, a founding member and diplomat representing the Russian Empire having died early that month.

== Online resources ==
- Jahresbericht der Geographischen Gesellschaft 1873-5

== Links ==
- Homepage
