= Georg Friedrich Wilhelm Rümker =

German astronomer (1832–1900)

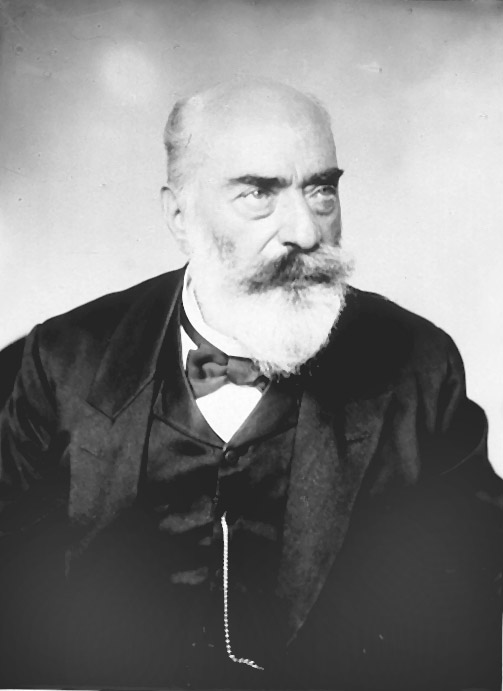
Georg Friedrich Wilhelm Rümker

Georg Friedrich Wilhelm Rümker (December 31, 1832 – March 3, 1900) was a German astronomer.

== Biography ==
Born at Hamburg, Georg Rümker was the son of Carl Ludwig Christian Rümker. He was astronomer at the observatory at Durham, England, from 1853 to 1856. He then became assistant at the Hamburger Sternwarte (Hamburg Observatory), then located at Stadtwall, and in 1862 was appointed director. He served as director until his death in 1900. He was succeeded by Richard Schorr.

When the Geographic Society in Hamburg was founded in 1873 he was appointed as second secretary.

His wife, Mary Hannah Crockford (1809–1889) was also an astronomer, known for her discovery of a comet in 1847 (which was observed slightly earlier by american astronomer Maria Mitchell).

From 1884 he was the Hamburg delegate for the International Earth Measurement.
