= Otto Moritz von Vegesack =

German diplomat

Otto Moritz von Vegesack (1807, Riga - 3 March 1874, Hamburg) was a Baltic German who served as a diplomat for the Russian Empire.

He was the son of Ernst Moritz von Vegesack and his wife Caroline Elizabeth von Kröger.

He attended the Riga Provincial Gymnasium before proceeding to the Imperial University of Dorpat, where he studied at the Faculty of Law (1825-1828). In 1832 he entered the service of the department of the Collegium of Foreign Affairs of the Russian Empire. Then in 1835 was appointed third secretary at the Russian mission in Greece. In 1839 he became a junior secretary, and was further promoted to senior secretary at the mission in Berlin in 1845. He retained that rank when he was transferred to Munich in 1850. When he attained the rank of chamberlain and became a state councillor in 1864, he was appointed chargé d'affaires for Hamburg, Lübeck and Bremen. From 1866 he was Resident Minister with responsibility for these cities and the courts of the Grand Duke of Oldenburg and the Duke of Brunswick. In 1873 he was promoted to Privy Councillor.

He was a founding member of the Geographic Society in Hamburg in 1873, but died the following year on 3 March 1874.
