= Semen Zhivago =

Russian painter (1807–1863)

- Born: 1807; Ryazan
- Died: March 27, 1863 (aged 55–56); Saint Petersburg
- Education: Member Academy of Arts (1839); Professor by rank (1842)
- Alma mater: Imperial Academy of Arts
- Known for: Painting

Semen Afanasyevich Zhivago (Russian: Семён Афанасьевич Живаго, 1807–1863) was a Russian historical painter.

== Biography ==
The son of a merchant from Ryazan, he taught himself how to paint from a young age. In 1826, he presented his work to Grand Duke Michael Pavlovich of Russia, who accepted the young man under her patronage and entered him into the St. Petersburg Academy of Fine Arts. After obtaining two silver medals, Zhivago finished his formation and soon left for his own calculation, into Italy, where he painted copies of famous Italian paintings for a living. For these works, on his return to Saint Petersburg, in 1839, it was acknowledged as an academician.

In 1842, he obtained the title of professor. From 1848 through 1850, he served with the Petersburg custom-house as expert for the painting recognition. In 1860 he moved to Moscow and worked there for the rest of his life. Aside from his historical paintings, Zhivago often painted for cathedrals and palaces and was a prolific portrait painter.

Semen Zhivago's works

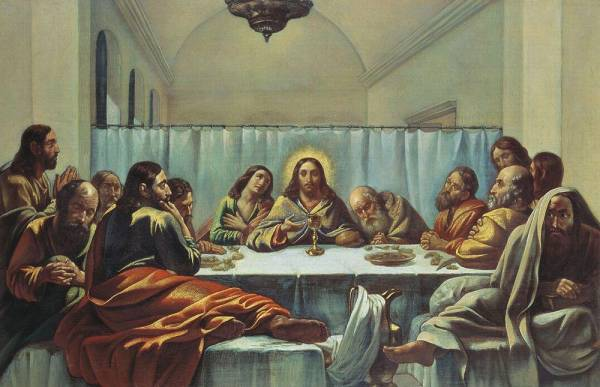
Last Supper (1846)

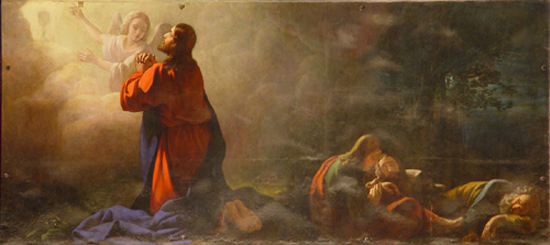
Agony in the Garden (1845)

== Links ==
- Article taken from Russian Wikipedia
