= SS Thuringia (1922) =

History
- Name: Thuringia (1922–30); General San Martin (1930–46); Empire Deben (1946–49)
- Owner: Hamburg Amerikanische Paketfahrt AG (1922–36); Hamburg-Südamerikanische Dampfschiffahrts-Gesellschaft (1936–40); Kriegsmarine (1940–45); Ministry of War Transport (1945); Ministry of Transport (1945–49)
- Operator: Hamburg Amerikanische Packetfahrt AG (1923–34); Hamburg-Südamerikanische Dampfschiffahrts-Gesellschaft (1934–40); Kriegsmarine (1940–45); Shaw, Savill & Albion Line (1945–49)
- Port of registry: (Weimar Republic) Hamburg, Germany (1922–33); (Nazi Germany) Hamburg (1933–45); (Nazi Germany) Kriegsmarine (1940–45); London, United Kingdom (1945–49)
- Builder: Howaldtswerke
- Launched: 12 August 1922
- Completed: 10 January 1923
- Commissioned: 20 January 1940
- Decommissioned: 26 June 1945
- Maiden voyage: 22 January 1923
- Out of service: March 1949
- Identification: Code Letters RDFC (1922–34); Code Letters DHIR (1934–45); Code Letters GQXY (1945–49)
- Fate: Scrapped

General characteristics
- Type: Ocean liner (1922–40); Barracks ship (1940–45); Tender (1945); Hospital ship (1945); Troopship (1945–49)
- Tonnage: 11,251 GRT; 6,579 NRT
- Length: 150.90 m (495 ft 1 in)
- Beam: 18.50 m (60 ft 8 in)
- Depth: 8.50 m (27 ft 11 in)
- Installed power: 5,300 shp (4.0 MW)
- Propulsion: Steam turbine
- Speed: 13.5 kn (25.0 km/h)
- Range: 13,500 nmi (25,000 km)
- Capacity: 158 Cabin class passengers and 380 3rd class passengers (Thuringia)
- Complement: 164

Thuringia was an 11,251 GRT ocean liner that was built in 1922 by Howaldtswerke, Kiel, Germany for the Hamburg Amerikanische Paketfahrt AG, Hamburg. In 1930, she was renamed General San Martin. In 1934, she was chartered by Hamburg Süd and sold to them in 1936. She was requisitioned by the Kriegsmarine in 1940 and served until 1945 as a barracks ship, and then as passenger ship during the evacuation of civilians from the Baltic.

She was seized in May 1945 by the British at Copenhagen, Denmark, passed to the Ministry of War Transport (MoWT) and renamed Empire Deben. She served as a troopship until 1949, when she was scrapped.

== Description ==
The ship was built in 1922 by Howaldtswerke, Kiel. She was yard number 610.

The ship was 150.90 metres (495 ft 1 in) long, with a beam of 18.50 metres (60 ft 8 in). She had a draft of 8.50 metres (27 ft 11 in). She was assessed at 11,251 GRT, 6,579 NRT.

The ship was propelled by a steam turbine, driving a single screw propeller. The turbine was made by Brown, Boveri & Compagnie, Mannheim. Rated at 5,300 shp (4.0 MW), it could propel her at 15.5 knots (28.7 km/h). Steam was supplied by five boilers. Her range was 11,500 nautical miles (21,300 km)

== History ==
Thuringia was built for the Hamburg Amerikanische Paketfahrt AG, Hamburg (HAPAG). The fourth HAPAG ship of that name, she was launched on 12 August 1922 and completed on 10 January 1923. She had a crew of 164, with accommodation for 158 cabin class and 680 third class passengers. Making her maiden voyage on 22 January 1923, she was used on the Hamburg - New York route. Thuringia made her last voyage for HAPAG starting on 9 January 1930 on the Hamburg – Cobh – Halifax – New York route.

In 1930, she was refitted for service on the South American route, and renamed General San Martin. Her Code Letters were RDFC. On 14 August 1931, she ran aground in the Tagus at Lisbon, Portugal. On 26 December 1932, General San Martin ran aground at Cuxhaven, Germany in fog. She was refloated later that day with assistance from a tug. With the changes to Code Letters in 1934, General San Martin was allocated the letters DHIR. On 18 March 1934, she was chartered by Hamburg Süd. General San Martin was bought by Hamburg Süd on 30 June 1936.

On 20 January 1940, General San Martin was requisitioned by the Kriegsmarine for use as a barracks ship. She served 7th U-boat Flotilla at Königsberg. From 1 March 1941 she served 3rd U-boat Flotilla at Kiel. From 1 October 1941 she served 8th U-boat Flotilla at Königsberg and then 32nd U-boat Flotilla from August 1944. From 15 January 1945, she served 7th U-boat Flotilla at Kiel. She is also said to have seen use as a tender during World War II. From 25 January 1945, General San Martin assisted in the evacuation of civilians from the Baltic. She transported over 30,000 people in eleven voyages. From 4 April 1945, she served as a hospital ship.

General San Martin was seized by the British in May 1945 at Copenhagen, Denmark. She was passed to the MoWT, which became the Ministry of Transport later that year. On 8 October, she was declared to be a prize of war. The Code Letters GQXY were allocated. Her port of registry was London. She was operated under the management of the Shaw, Savill & Albion Line. In 1946, she was renamed Empire Deben. She was used as a troopship, serving in this role until 1949. Her departure from Southampton, Hampshire on 14 September 1948 for Gibraltar, Malta and Port Said, Egypt was delayed due to engine defects. One of the apprentices who served on board Empire Deben was Dennis Scott-Masson, who was the captain of Canberra during the Falklands War. Empire Deben was scrapped in March 1949 at Newport, Monmouthshire.
