= Ivan Rakhmaninov =

Ivan Gerasimovich Rakhmaninov (Russian: Иван Герасимович Рахманинов; born 1753 in Kazinka village, Kozlovsky district, Tambov Governorate – died January 27 [O.S. January 15] 1807) was a Russian publisher, translator and educator.

In the 1780s he published his translations from Voltaire to the Russian language. In 1791 he started publishing a monumental 20-volume collection of Voltaire works translated to Russian, but in 1794 his typography was confiscated by authorities (only three volumes of Voltaire were published). Rakhmaninov also published his own magazine Utrenniye Chasy (Morning hours) and Ivan Krylov's magazine Pochta Dukhov (Spirit's Mail).
