= First Russian circumnavigation =

1803–1806 naval expedition

The First Russian circumnavigation
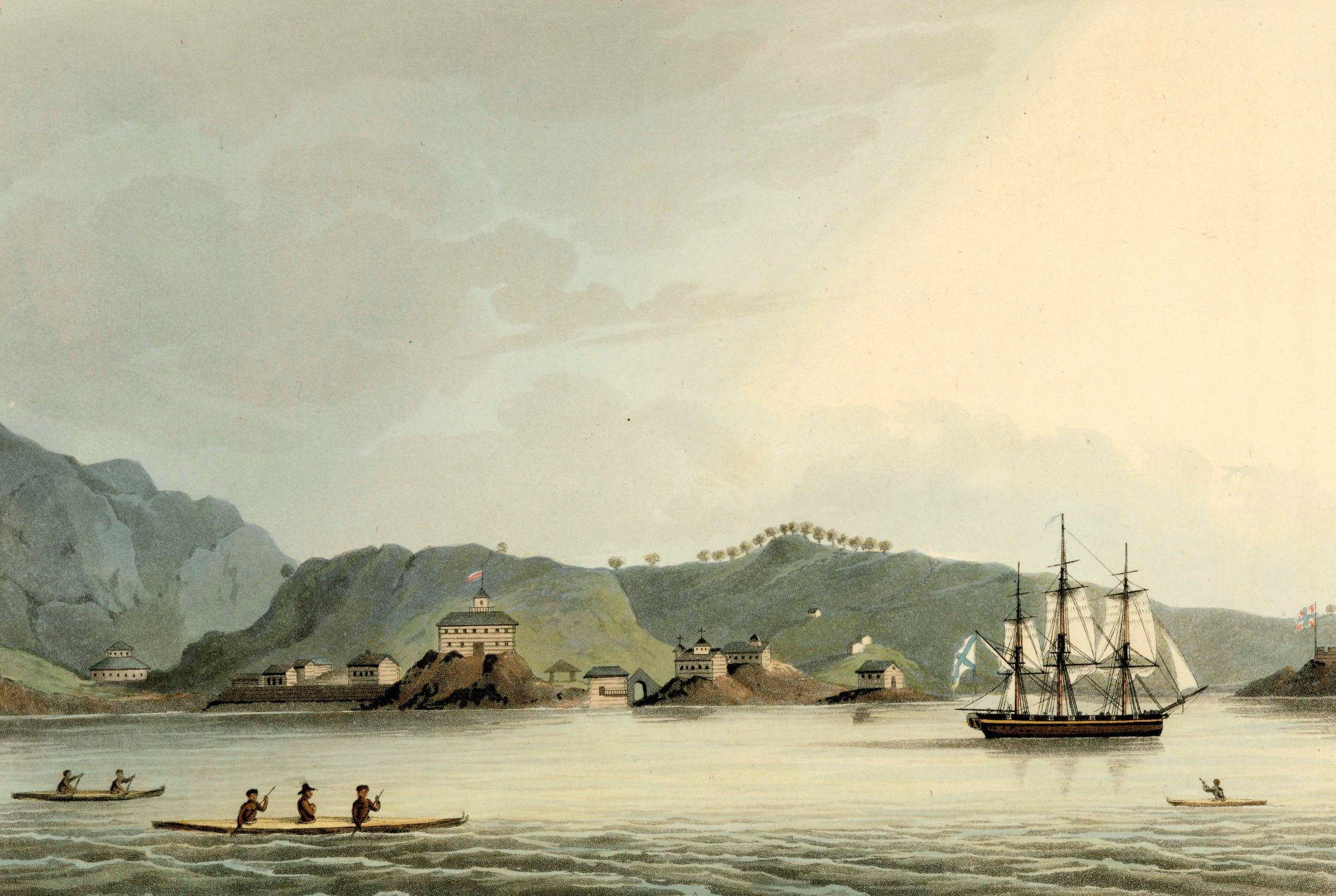
- Harbour of St Paul on the Island of Cadiack, Russian sloop-of-war Neva
- Type: Circumnavigational expedition
- Target: Kronstadt Island, Saint Petersburg
- Date: August 1803 – August 1806
- Executed by: Adam Johann von Krusenstern, Yuri Lisyansky

The first Russian circumnavigation of the Earth occurred between August 1803 and August 1806. It was carried out by two ships, the Nadezhda and the Neva, under the commands of Adam Johann von Krusenstern and Yuri Lisyansky, respectively.

The main goal was to establish diplomatic and economic relations between Russia and Japan and facilitate fur trading through Chinese ports. The Chinese leg of the expedition was tied to a mission and planned embassy headed by Yury Golovkin. Likewise, the party included a sizeable diplomatic delegation bound for Japan, headed by the court chamberlain and plenipotentiary ambassador Nikolai Rezanov. Rezanov was also the "High Representative" of the Russian-American Company. Rezanov and Krusenstern frequently fought over priorities during the voyage.

The route of the first Russian circumnavigation

The ships set off from Kronstadt on August 7, stopping at Copenhagen, Falmouth, Tenerife, Brazil, Nuku Hiva, and Hawaii. When the expedition reached the Hawaiian Islands in June 1804, the two vessels parted ways – the Nadezhda went to Kamchatka and Japan, while the Neva headed to Kodiak Island, Alaska, where it spent 14 months and participated in the Russian-Tlingit war. The ships reunited in Guangzhou in December 1805, and after leaving China, they sailed together for a short time before returning independently to Kronstadt in August 1806.

In its goal of establishing relations with the Japanese, the expedition failed as Japanese authorities did not allow the envoy to enter the country and refused to establish diplomatic ties. In 1805, Rezanov and his retinue landed in Kamchatka and later began to insert themselves in local politics. For instance, they played a role in the Khvostov Incident and the further deterioration of Russo-Japanese relations.

The expedition made several discoveries in the Pacific, including the naming and mapping of islands, archipelagos, capes, reefs, and straits. In addition to geographical exploration, the crew collected extensive botanical, zoological, and ethnographic information. Many participants in the expedition later published accounts of their travels in multiple languages, while some diaries and journals remained unpublished until the 21st century.

== Background ==
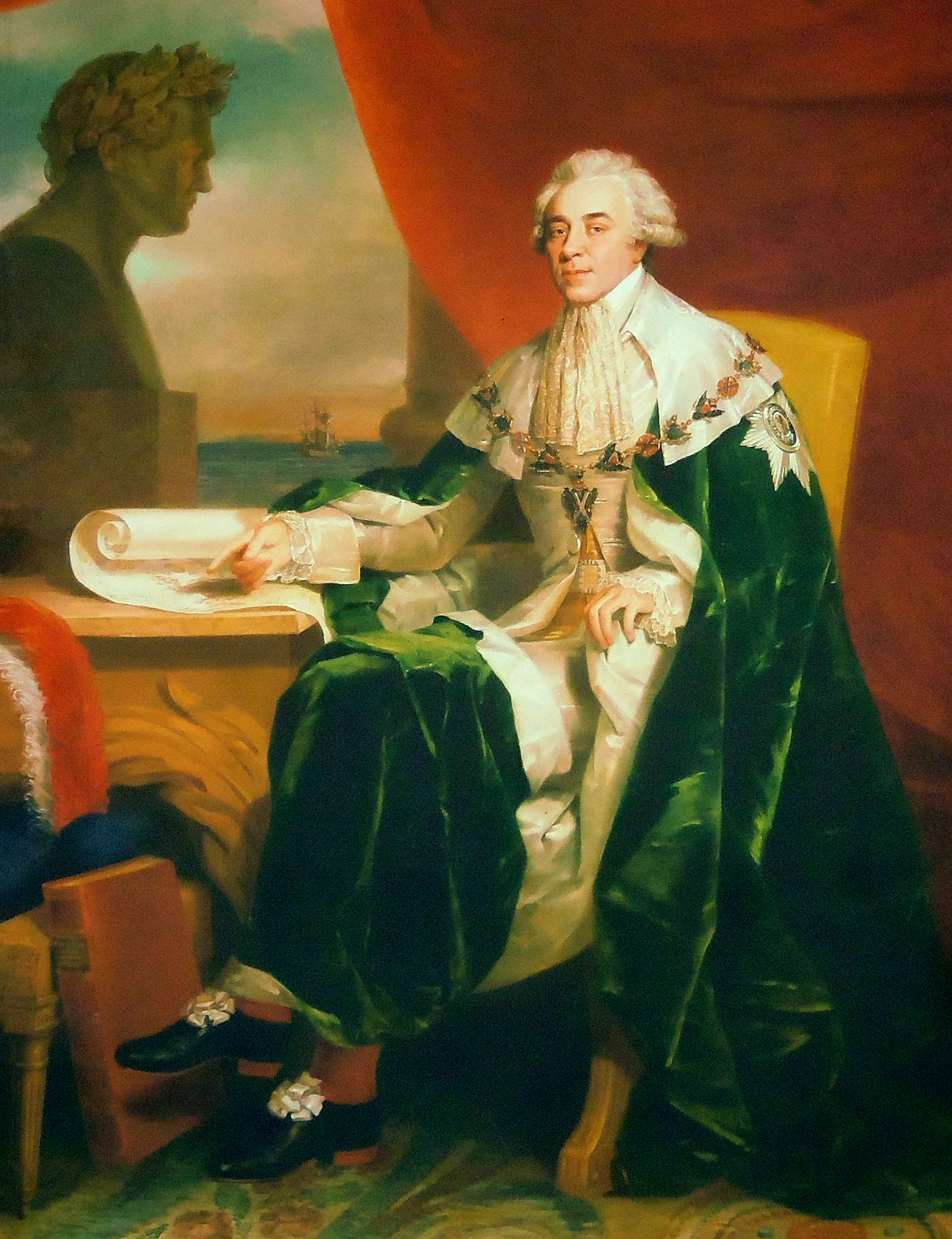
Nikolay Rumyantsev, Russian statesman who sponsored the expedition

The historian Nikolay Bolhovitinov argues that although the first Russian circumnavigation was carried out in the 19th century, it could have been possible as early as the 18th century. During the 1780s, growing activity by Great Britain, France, and the United States in the North Pacific, threatened Russian interests in the Far East – notably, the Aleutian Islands where the Chukchi people resisted colonization through force. At that time, territorial claims among colonial powers were often justified using comprehensive and original cartographic data. However, Russian cartographers had left large parts of Alaska uncharted, sections that were instead present on James Cook's maps.

On December 22, 1786, Empress Catherine the Great of Russia signed an order directing the Admiralty Board to send the Baltic fleet to Kamchatka via the Cape of Good Hope and Sunda Strait. The 1st rank captain, Grigory Mulovsky headed the squadron; in April 1787, the Admiralty board sent him his orders. Mulovsky was instructed to map the Kuril Islands, pass Sakhalin, and then reaching Nootka Island, annex to Russia "all banks to the starting point of Aleksei Chirikov's discoveries." Russian claims were to be "established" by the planting of cast-iron pillars bearing the state emblem, as well as the distribution of 1,700 medals among the Indigenous population. Mulovsky would not have to go to Europe as his ships were instructed to remain in the Far East and Russian America.

In early 1787, James Trevenen submitted his proposal to Catherine for developing the fur trade in the Pacific. Trevenen's plan called for three ships to sail from Kronstadt to Cape Horn; two ships would stay in Kamchatka while the third delivered furs to China and Japan. Subsequently, Trevenen was appointed as a 2nd Rank captain of the Russian Navy. However, the start of the Russo-Turkish War and Russo-Swedish War led to the cancellation of the expedition.

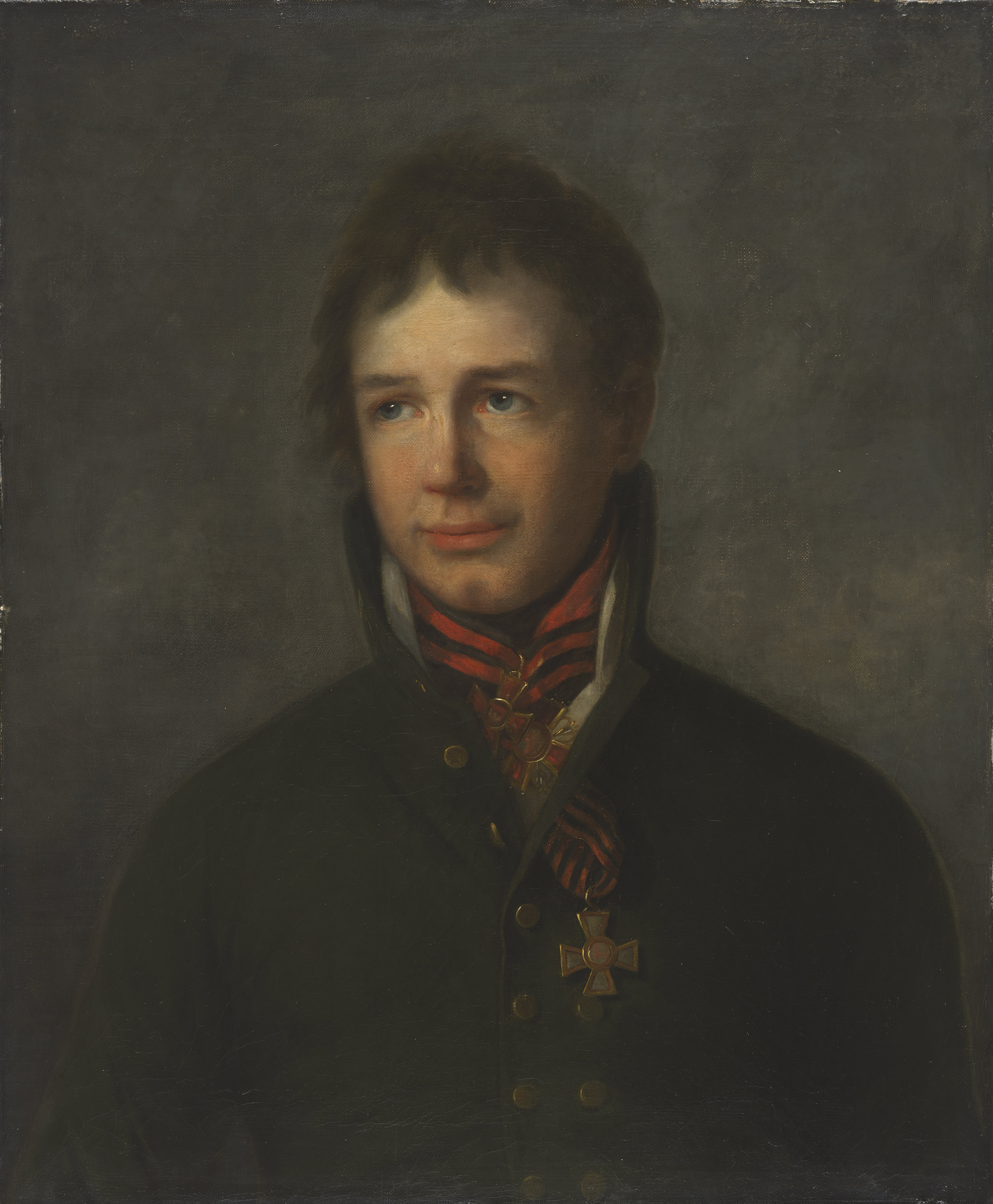
Krusenstern's portrait by Johann Friedrich Weitsch, 1808

Between 1791 and 1802, the wealthy merchant Thorkler from Reval (Tallinn) undertook several round-the-world and half-round-the-world expeditions on French ships, visiting places such as Petropavlovsk-Kamchatsky, Nootka Island, Canton, and Kolkata. Correspondence between Thorkler and Count Nikolay Rumyantsev indicates that Thorkler played a significant role in lobbying for Adam Johann von Krusenstern's expedition and organizing his voyages to Kolkata and Canton from 1805 to 1807. Archival documents, like the 1819 Overview of the Russian-American Company, confirm that Russian ships had crossed the equator before Krusenstern's trip.

Krusenstern served under Mulovsky and was likely familiar with his plans for a Pacific expedition. Alongside Lisyansky and Yakov Bering (Note: Yakov Bering graduated from Naval Cadet Corps and was among those Gardes de la Marine who were assigned to the Mulovskii's expedition. He died in 1797 after being assigned for an internship in the British Royal Navy.), Krusenstern joined an expedition with the British merchant fleet. Between 1793 and 1799, Krusenstern, Lisyansky, and Bering journeyed to North and South America, India, and China. In 1799, Krusenstern submitted a plan to statesman Petr Soymonov emphasizing the importance of supplying Russian America and trading with China. Irkutsk Governor Larion Nagel also submitted a plan on establishing diplomatic and trading relations with Japan. However, due to the ongoing war with France, none of the projects were implemented.

== Plan and equipment ==
=== Krusenstern's project and the report of the Russian-American company ===
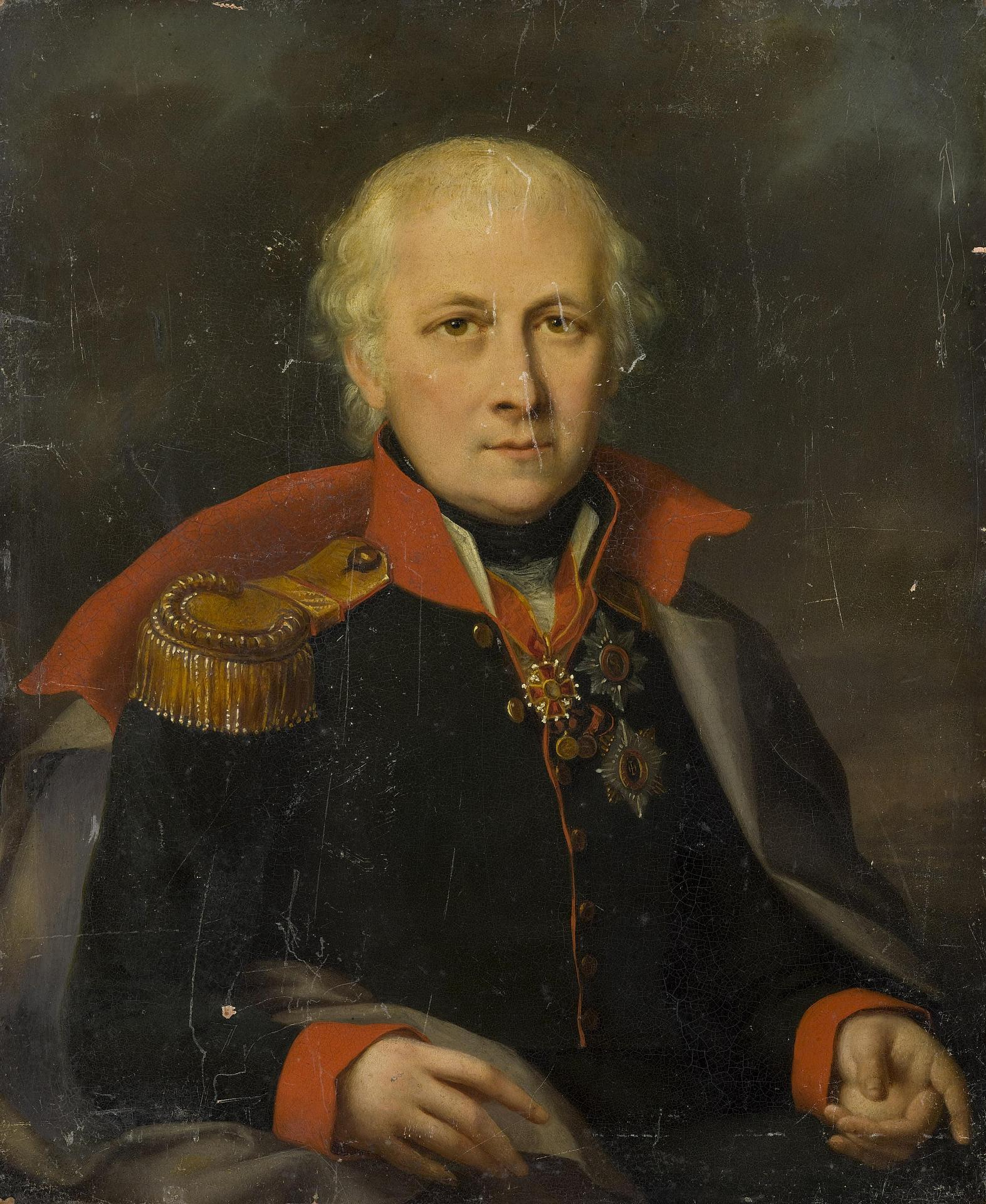
Unknown painter. The portrait of the admiral Nikolay Mordvinov, stored in Hermitage

After failing to garner government interest in sponsoring his expedition in 1799 and 1800, Krusenstern retreated to his Estonian estate, settling into married life. A new opportunity arose under the rule of Alexander I, as the Russian government faced financial strain due to its involvement in the Second and Third Coalitions against France, leading Krusenstern to resubmit his plan.

Krusenstern's 25-page manuscript, dated January 1, 1802, eventually reached Nikolay Mordvinov, the vice-president of the Admiralty Board just, as the Kamchatka marine expedition was developing. Krusenstern highlighted Russian commercial interests "from which the country was excluded out of its neglect." He argued for robust state support for large, private enterprises to develop shipping in the Pacific and proposed using ports in Northwest America and Kamchatka to strengthen the Russian position in the fur trade while reducing the strength of England and the US.

Goods received in the Far East would be delivered to the Saint Petersburg sea, bypassing Kyakhta, which could, over time, grant the Russian Empire access to Southeast Asian and Indian markets and help establish the Russian East India Company. On July 26, 1802, Alexander I approved the project, granting Krusenstern permission to implement it independently.

On July 29, 1802, Minister of Commerce Nikolay Rumyantsev and Nikolai Rezanov, representing the Main Board of the Russian-American Company, submitted a similar project, referring to Krusenstern's original 1799 proposal. The project sought to free the citizens of the Yakutsk region from heavy overland traffic, strengthen Russian positions in the Pacific, and expand trade with China. Drawing on Krusenstern's suggestion, the project proposed populating Urup Island and establishing trade with Japan through the mediation of the indigenous Ainu. The project required a state loan of 250,000 rubles for eight years to finance the expedition at 2% per annum. Additionally, the plan also suggested granting the merchant Alexander Baranov a title.

=== Travel plans and command ===
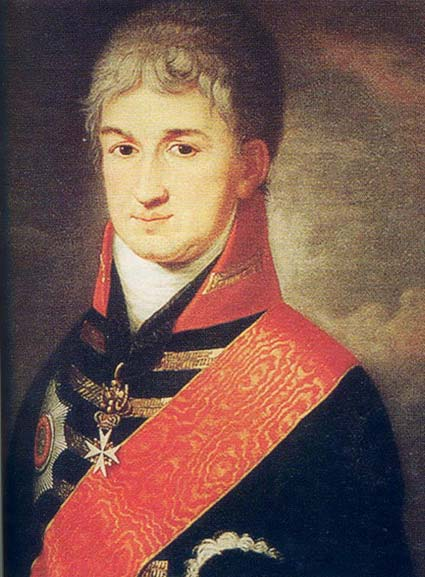
Unknown painter. Portrait of Nikolay Rezanov. Stored in the State Historical Museum

The government approved the plan proposed by the Russian-American Company (RAC); however, appointing a commander proved complicated. On April 17, 1802, Yuri Lisyansky wrote to Krusenstern, noting that vice-president Mordvinov had inquired about Krusenstern's personal qualities. Initially, however, the RAC's directorate appointed an English skipper, Makmeister, as commander. Only after Count Rumyantsev had intervened on August 7, 1802, was Krusenstern officially designated as the expedition's commander. Lisyansky was also recruited to the RAC shortly after, on August 21.

By July 1802, the RAC was on the verge of bankruptcy and could only sponsor one ship. The directors agreed that the state would fully back the second vessel. During the expedition, the RAC flag had not yet been approved. As a result, the Nadezhda (under the command of Krusenstern) primarily flew St. Andrew's flag, while the Neva flew the national flag.

The expedition aimed to explore the Amur River and nearby areas, find convenient ports for the Russian Pacific fleet, bring cargo to Alaska, and establish trading relations with Japan and Canton. After Alexander I's coronation, the expedition was granted 325 medals distribute among natives and settlers.

On February 20, 1803, Rezanov proposed that he be appointed Ambassador to Japan, a plan officially approved on June 10. At that time, relations between Krusenstern and Rezanov remained neutral. The RAC instructed Captain Krusenstern on May 29, 1803, that he was the "main commander" of the expedition, outranking the embassy officials on his ship. Rezanov's authority extended only to the company clerks bound for Canton.

Before departure, both sloops were stocked with two years of food, supplies, and promised wages. The crew and officers of the Nadezhda were employees of the Imperial Navy, while those aboard the Neva fell under the RAC.

Nikolai Rezanov, though not a professional diplomat, started his court service in Derzhavin's office during the reign of Catherine II. On June 26, 1803, he was elected as an honorary member of the Academy of Science. Later, on July 10, Rezanov received the rank of Court Chamberlain and the Order of Saint Anna, First Class. Leveraging his connections with the Ministry of Foreign Affairs, he secured the status of a diplomatic agent of the second rank – Extraordinary Envoy and Minister Plenipotentiary.

Historians suggest that Rezanov's appointment to the expedition may have been politically motivated as a form of exile, as he allegedly conspired against Platon Zubov and Peter Ludwig von der Pahlen. The decline of Derzhavin's career also may have sealed Rezanov's fate.

According to the RAC instructions dated July 10, 1803, and a letter from Rumyantsev to Rezanov on May 28, 1803, the expedition was to sail to Kamchatka and Alaska, navigating around Cape Horn through Cape Verde and port Valparaíso in Chile. On return, the ships were to visit Canton and ports in South Asia and India. Additionally, Lisyansky and the Neva were tasked with exploring the Bering Strait. On June 18, 1803, Baron J. K. Odeleben proposed adding stops in Africa to organize the resettlement of Africans to Far Eastern Russia as free colonists. However, the plan was ultimately rejected.

Minister of Foreign Affairs, Chancellor Alexander Vorontsov, ordered Russian embassies in England, Spain, the Netherlands, Portugal, and France to ask their local governments to help the expedition. The British consulate in St. Petersburg allowed the expedition to act on British lands freely.

Finally, both ships were to reach the Hawaiian islands, where Lisyansky would lead the Neva to Russian America while Nadezhda would seek Japan. After wintering on Kamchatka or Kodiak Island, the sloops would reunite and head to Canton. Krusenstern was given the authority to choose the return route independently.

=== Expedition and purchase of vessels ===
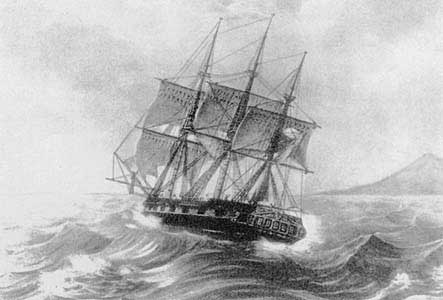
Drawing believed to depict Nadezhda in stormy weather

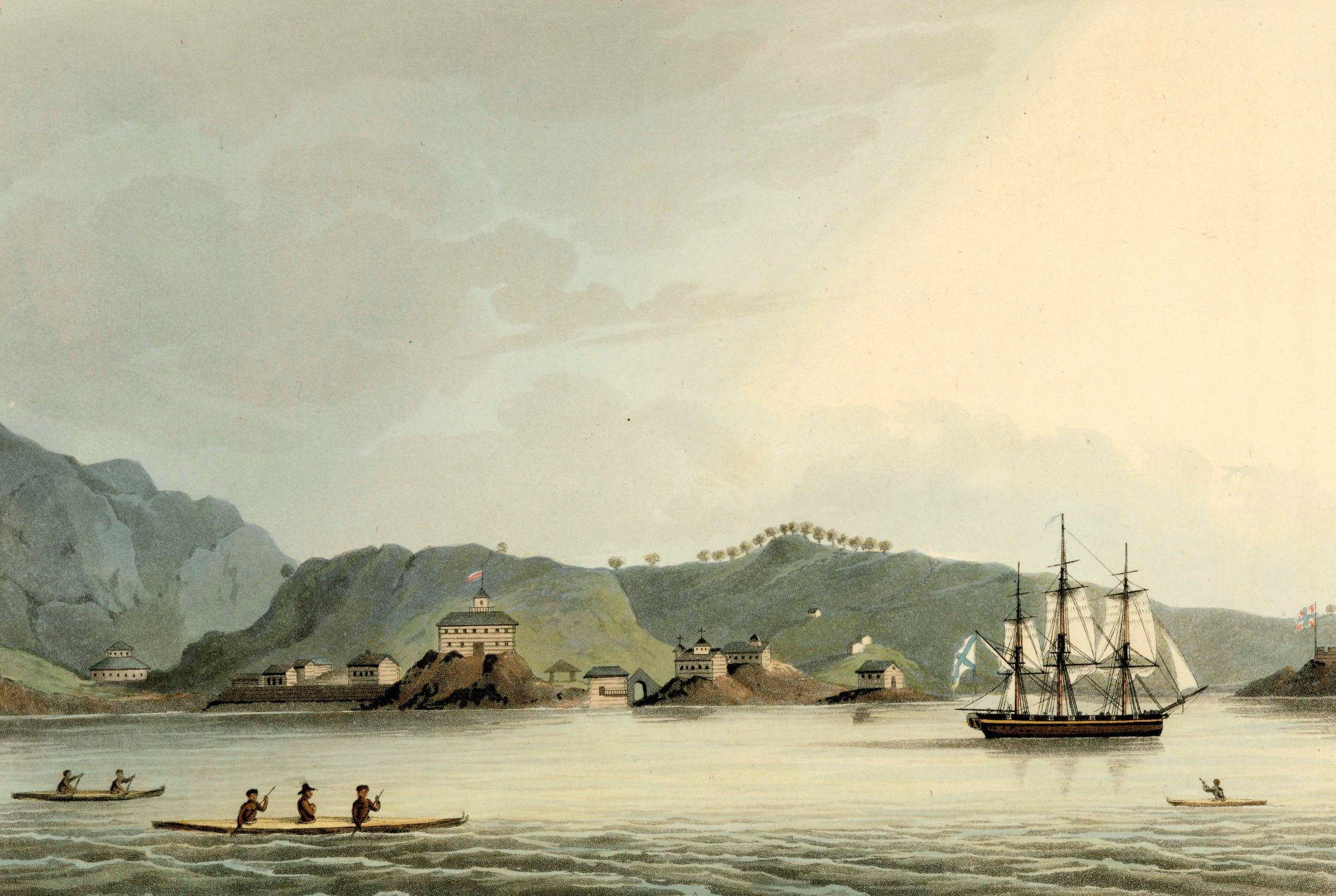
The sloop Neva visits Kodiak.

It is unclear why the RAC bought foreign ships. At the time, the Russian navy had 10 suitable vessels, excluding cargo ships. Rezanov also mentioned that shipbuilder Daniil Masalsky would build a vessel of any size specifically for the voyage. However, the directors decided to buy ships abroad and sent Lisyansky to complete the task.

On September 24, 1802, Lisyansky and shipbuilder Ilya Razumov left for Hamburg but could not find any ships that met the expedition's requirements. They bought two sloops in England: the 16-gun 450-ton Leander (renamed Nadezhda) and the 14-gun 370-ton Thames (renamed Neva). Some officers claimed that Lisyansky conspired with the seller and embezzled the money by buying old ships for the price of new ones. Nadezhda was built around 1795 and had previously been captured by France. Its foremast had been damaged by canister shot, and pieces of the hull had rotted. Having previously sailed to India, Neva was better suited for a circumnavigation, but its rigging needed replacement.

Repairs were not performed in Kronstadt to avoid disciplinary action against Lisyansky. Instead, the foremast and the main mast were replaced in Brazil at the expense of the RAC, even though £5000 had already been spent on initial repairs in England. Krusenstern claimed that both vessels cost around £17000. However, according to the Ministry of Foreign Affairs, the cost was £25000. According to the History of the Russian-American Company, Nadezhda cost 82024 silver rubles and, Neva cost 89214 silver rubles. Lisyansky calculated that the overall expedition budget was around 700000 assignation rubles, including £24000 (270000 rubles) for both vessels. In addition, an extra sum of 20,000 Mexican dollars was allocated to maintain Rezanov's retinue.

The ships' poor conditions became clear in Kronstadt on June 5, 1803. The Nadezhda was in a particularly deplorable state. In stormy weather, its hull was constantly leaking and was at risk of flooding. Upon arrival at Kamchatka, the expedition leadership even suggested abandoning the vessel.

=== Expedition personnel ===
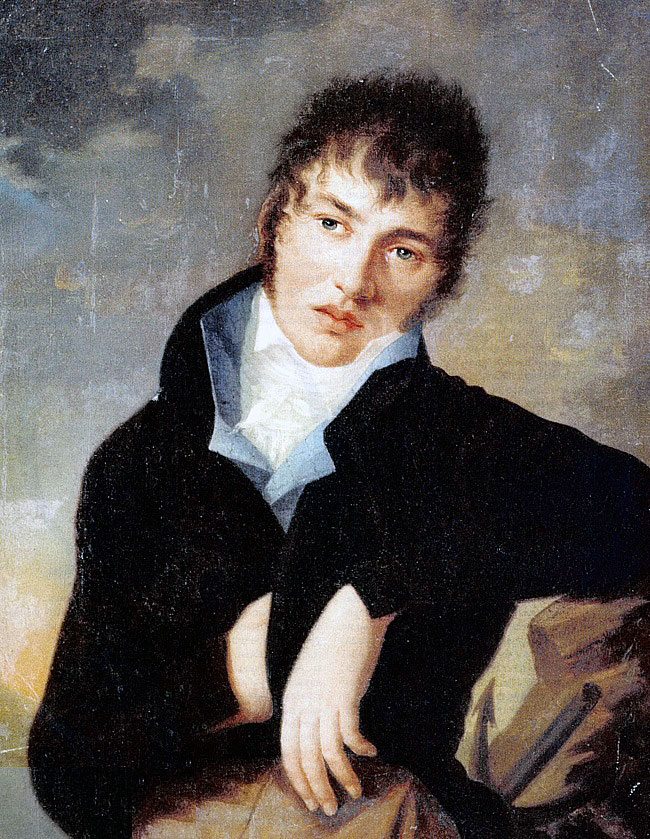
Portrait of count Fyodor Ivanovich Tolstoy, unknown painter

According to official documentation, 129 people were aboard the two vessels: 84 on the Nadezhda and 45 on the Neva. Besides officers, non-commissioned officers, and seamen, the expedition included Ambassador Rezanov's retinue, RAC officers, and five Japanese survivors of the Wakamiya-maru wreck returning to their homeland. Initially, officers took leave from the military and signed contracts with the RAC. However, the voyage was still counted as work experience and a qualified maritime command. Five officers and non-commissioned officers were promoted during the expedition. Krusenstern wrote that even though he was advised to hire foreign seamen, he decided to take Russian volunteers for whom he procured a salary of 120 rubles. Also, allegedly, Tatar sailor Abdul Abuzarov was recruited but later married an Estonian girl just four months before the departure. According to Krusenstern, he "fell into deep thoughtfulness." In the end, the directors decided to leave him in Russia.

Both Krusenstern and Lisyansky listed all the crew members by name. Most of the officers and passengers were very young. The oldest crew members were 42-year-old doctor Karl von Espenberg and 39-year-old Rezanov. (Note: The age of the RAC's clerk Fedor Shemelin is still unknown. Judging by the indirect evidence, he was born in 1755 and was first mentioned in one of Shelikhov's letters from 1786. By the time he was enrolled in the expedition, he had already visited Okhotsk and the Chinese border several times.) Krusenstern himself was 33. The youngest crew members were 13 and 15-year-old cadets Mavrikiy Kotzebue and Otto von Kotzebue, at the request of their father (whose wife was Krusenstern's cousin). Makar Ratmanov, a combat veteran, was appointed as a first assistant. Lieutenant Romberg had served under Krusenstern's command on the frigate Narva. Michman Fabian Gottlieb von Bellingshausen proved an excellent cartographer and was promoted to lieutenant. The ambassador's retinue also included some random selections: in particular, Count Fyodor Tolstoy, hieromonk Gideon (Fedotov) from the Alexander Nevsky Lavra, and clerk Nikolai Korobitsyn from the RAC. Korobitsyn was to supervise Lisyansky and act as the ship's treasurer.

The commanders differed in their communication styles. Krusenstern thought that the crew needed to be treated softly, for which Levenstern criticized him. Lisyansky, meanwhile, introduced corporal punishment to the Neva. Priest Gideon was said to dislike him since Lisyansky allegedly banned worship on the ship (Note: In his report to the archbishop Amvrosiy (Pobedov) Gideon wrote: "Captain Lisyansky and michman Berh – people of a restless disposition, they offended me a lot... I pass and keep silence on the repeated prohibition of making worships on Sunday and Lord's holidays, the only God's joy that one can have on the sea; I am ashamed mentioning various stinging ridicules on religion. The son of Nezhin, Archpriest Lisyansky, who seems to have been born and raised in the very bowels of religion, often drank Tenerife wine at the table, saying these words to me: "Father! For the health of the Mother of God." When we were on Santa Catarina Island in Brazil, he was trying to quarrel me with His Excellency N. P. Rezanov. On its way from Cape Horn to the Easter island on March 25, 1804, again, me, old man, got a formidable storm again from the captain: he wanted to hammer me, hammer me in the cabin just because I was sitting on the dowels while he was walking on the deck. Still, the love of other officers stepped in and protected me. On the Marquesas Islands, he ordered the team not to let me go to ashore because after my arrival from the Nadezhda I did not come to the captain cabin and did not personally tell him about my arrival, even though the officer in charge knew that.), which probably led to his resignation. In addition, Lisyansky often strayed from the Admiralty College and acted separately from the Nadezhda.

Lieutenants Ratmanov and Romberg knew French and even corresponded with Nikolay Karamzin. When playing music in the mess, Romberg was the first violin in the ship's orchestra, (Note: According to Levenstern' diaries, Nadezhda's orchestra included Romberg - first violin, Tilesius - bass, Langsdorf - viola, Frederici - first flute, Horner - second flute.) while Ratmanov read books on travel and philosophy even during shifts and got annoyed if others distracted him.

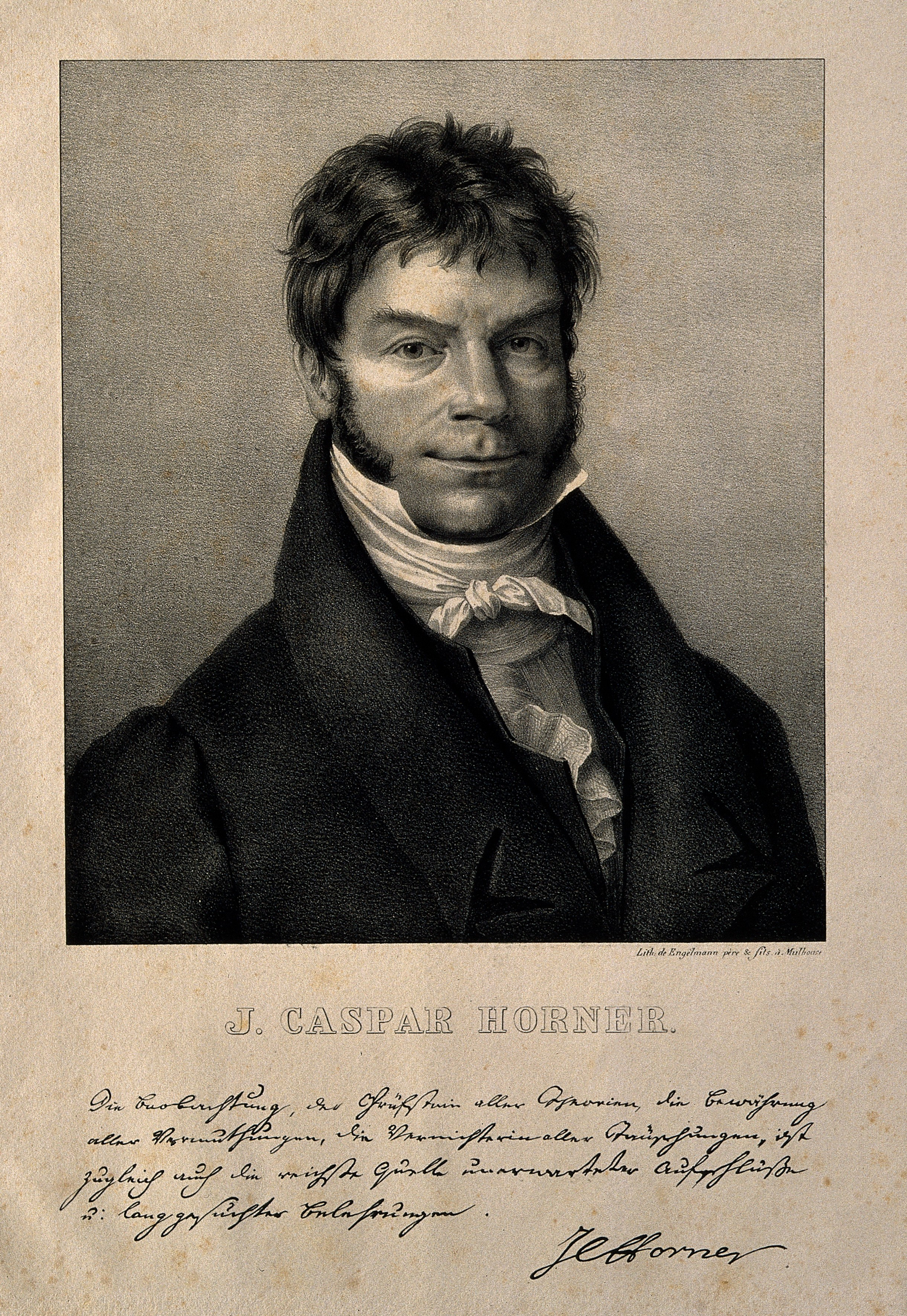
Johann Caspar Horner "Lithography of Engelman"

Although the RAC did not have explicit scientific aims, Krusenstern created a Scientific Committee within his crew. Based on the recommendation of Austrian astronomer Franz Xaver von Zach, the directors hired Swiss flautist Johann Caspar Horner, who had once stolen the skull of an executed man in Macau, to serve as a specimen. Botanist and zoologist Wilhelm Gottlieb Tilesius von Tilenau was the main principal of the expedition; he had probably attended Adam Friedrich Oeser's classes in Leipzig. Doctor of medicine Georg von Langsdorff went to Copenhagen personally and asked Krusenstern and Rezanov to accept him in the crew. He landed with Rezanov in Kamchatka and headed to Russian America. Karl Espenberg was a doctor with a degree from the University of Jena. He also served as Krusenstern's family doctor starting in 1797. Doctor Moritz Laband served the Neva. He was originally from Silesia and probably Jewish. He graduated from the Martin Luther University of Halle-Wittenberg.

The expedition struggled with culture and language barriers. Of all officers on the Nadezhda, only Ratmanov, Rezanov, Count Tolstoy, Fyodor Shemelin (merchant), Brinkin (botanist), Kurlyandov (painter), and Petr Golovachev were of Russian origin. Others were ethnic Germans with different linguistic dialects. Langsdorf was from Swabia; Tilesius from Thuringia; Horner from Switzerland; Robberg from the Grand Duchy of Finland. Krusenstern, Levenstern, Espenberg, Bellingshausen, and Kotzebue were all Baltic Germans. Most of the scientists did not know Russian; only a few officers knew German. Levenstern wrote that the crew could speak German, English, French, and Russian. Botanist Brinkin had learnt Latin so well that he tried persuading others in the crew to communicate with it. However, Langsdorff and von Tilenau were not convinced. The scientists also got along poorly because von Tilenau and Langdorff often fought.

=== Living Conditions ===
The expedition vessels had little room for fresh water and provisions compared to their sizable crews and storage for trade. Crackers and corned beef composed the daily fare. The crew members also ate sauerkraut and cranberry juice to protect against scurvy. Uniforms, linens, and bedding designed for different latitudes were made in England. Living conditions were extreme: even officers and Lisyansky's retinue could only use their cabins for sleeping. The only places where people could conduct research, draw maps, or write diaries were the messes. Even senior officials Krusenstern and Rezanov huddled in cabins of 6 m^{2} with no basic household amenities: no heating, ventilation, or lighting. For 84 people, there were only 3 latrines. According to Levenstern's diary, one RAC clerk lived in a cargo box instead of a cabin. The constant shortage of freshwater made washing very difficult. In addition, the crews had to keep animals (including a cow with a calf, birds, and pigs) on board.

Under these conditions, crew members with few responsibilities spent their days arguing and gambling. The officers struggled to keep watch, make weather observations, write travel journals, and supervise and train the crew. Observations could take a minimum of three hours per day. Lieutenants had three shifts – two 3-hour day shifts and a 4-hour night shift. As a result, many experienced nervous breakdowns. While staying on the island Nuku-Hiva, Kurlyandov grabbed an axe and ransacked his entire cabin, not even sparing the icons.

=== Scientific Equipment ===
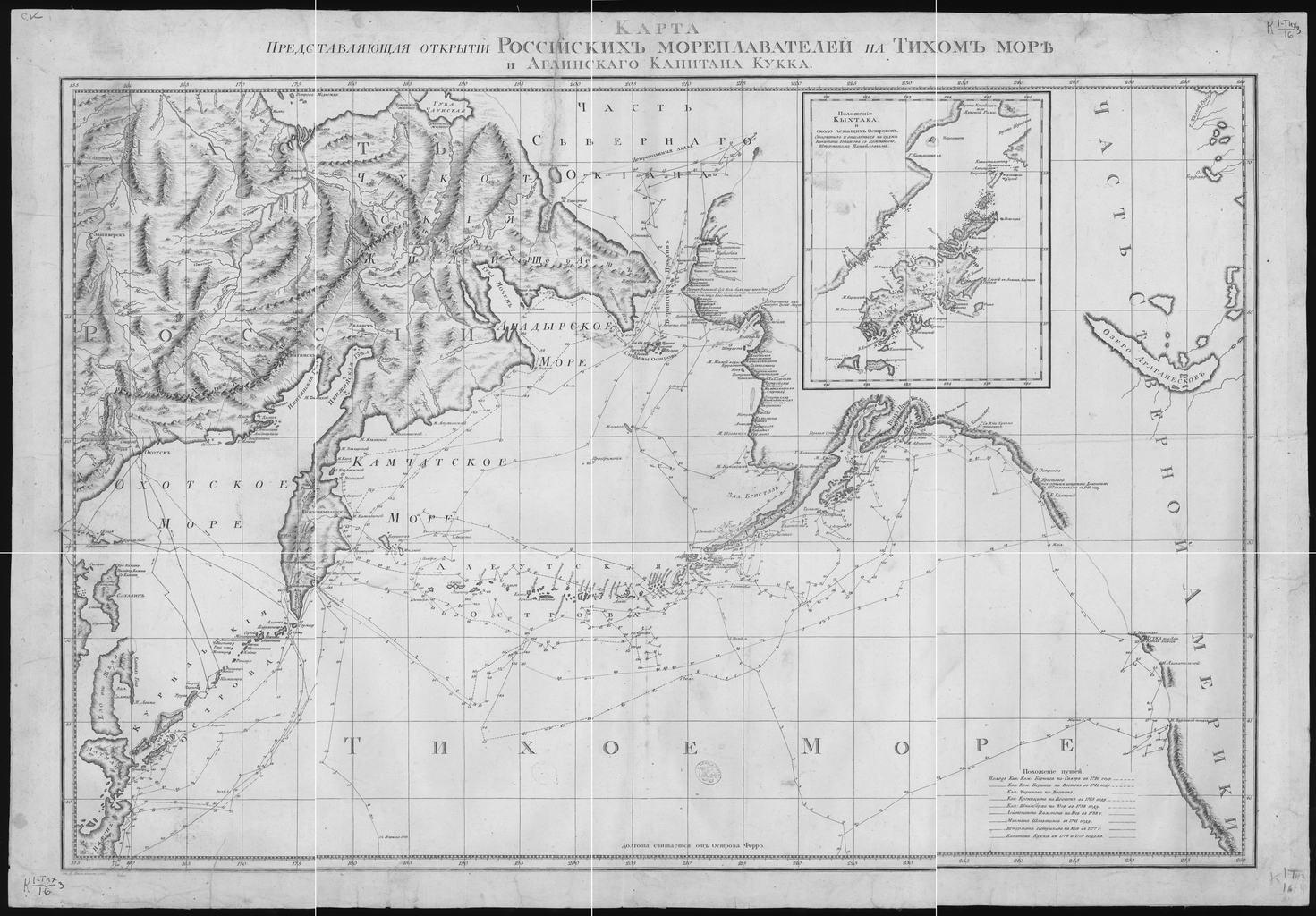
Map of the geographical discoveries made by Russian sailors, Pacific explorers, and James Cook, 1787

According to historian Elena Govor, participants on the voyage thought of themselves as heirs of James Cook and Lapérouse. Lieutenant Romberg compared the trip from Falmouth to Tenerife with Lapérouse's voyage from Brest to Madeira. Ratmanov expressed similar thoughts right after their arrival to Santa Catarina Island. On Kamchatka, Ratmanov installed a new tombstone for Cook's comrade Charles Clerke, whose burial place was initially identified by Lapérouse. Lisyansky's crew visited Kealakekua Bay, where James Cook was killed.

The Saint Petersburg Academy of Sciences provided instructions for the scientists. For example, Vasily Severgin compiled a specific manual for studying minerals. Scientist Timofey Smelovsky compiled instructions on botany, while Alexander Sevastyanov worked on zoology. Sevastyanov identified four geographical regions for natural history study, including geographies of Japan and Kamchatka. Sevastyanov provided 14 basic procedures for conducting observations including marking specimens according to binomial nomenclature, sketching appearances, and conveying samples for transfer to the Imperial Cabinet of the Russian Empire. However, Langsdorff ignored the last point. The majority of the collected samples were sent to the Natural History Museum in Berlin.

On June 13, 1803, Commerce Minister Count Rumyantsev suggested that Krusenstern find Hashima Island, allegedly seen by Dutch and Spanish sailors. To define geographic coordinates, Krusenstern and astronomer Horner used a Chronometer watch. However, the ship's rolling changed chronometer data significantly, and later, in Japan, the apparatus broke. The temperature on the Nadezhda was measured in the Réaumur scale, and on the Neva in Fahrenheit. According to Yuly Shokalsky, this was the first expedition where vertical assessments of deep-ocean temperatures were measured. Measurements were carried out via the so-called "Galsov's machine," a primitive bathometer in the form of a copper cylinder with valves, inside of which there was a mercury thermometer. Systematic observations were only possible during the stop in Nagasaki from October 11, 1804, to April 17, 1805. Krusenstern personally measured temperature, pressure, humidity, atmospheric transparency, direction, strength, duration of the wind, thunderstorms, clouds, fogs, dew, and other meteorological phenomena at 8 am, 4 pm, and 8 pm.

The Nadezhda had a library with the personal books of officers and scientists, including Krusenstern's book collection, now stored in the Central Naval Library. All books on the voyage (around 48) have Krusenstern's note "Nadezhda, 1803–1806." The collection contained atlases and maps, nautical plans, works on astronomy and mathematics, and descriptions of travels that worked as sailing directions. Krusenstern thought that Antoine François Prévost's publication "Mémoires et aventures d 'un homme de qualité qui s'est retiré du monde" was so important that later he even passed it to Kotzebue: the book travelled around the world twice.

== Expedition ==
=== From Kronstadt to Brazil (August - December 1803) ===
==== Baltic Sea ====
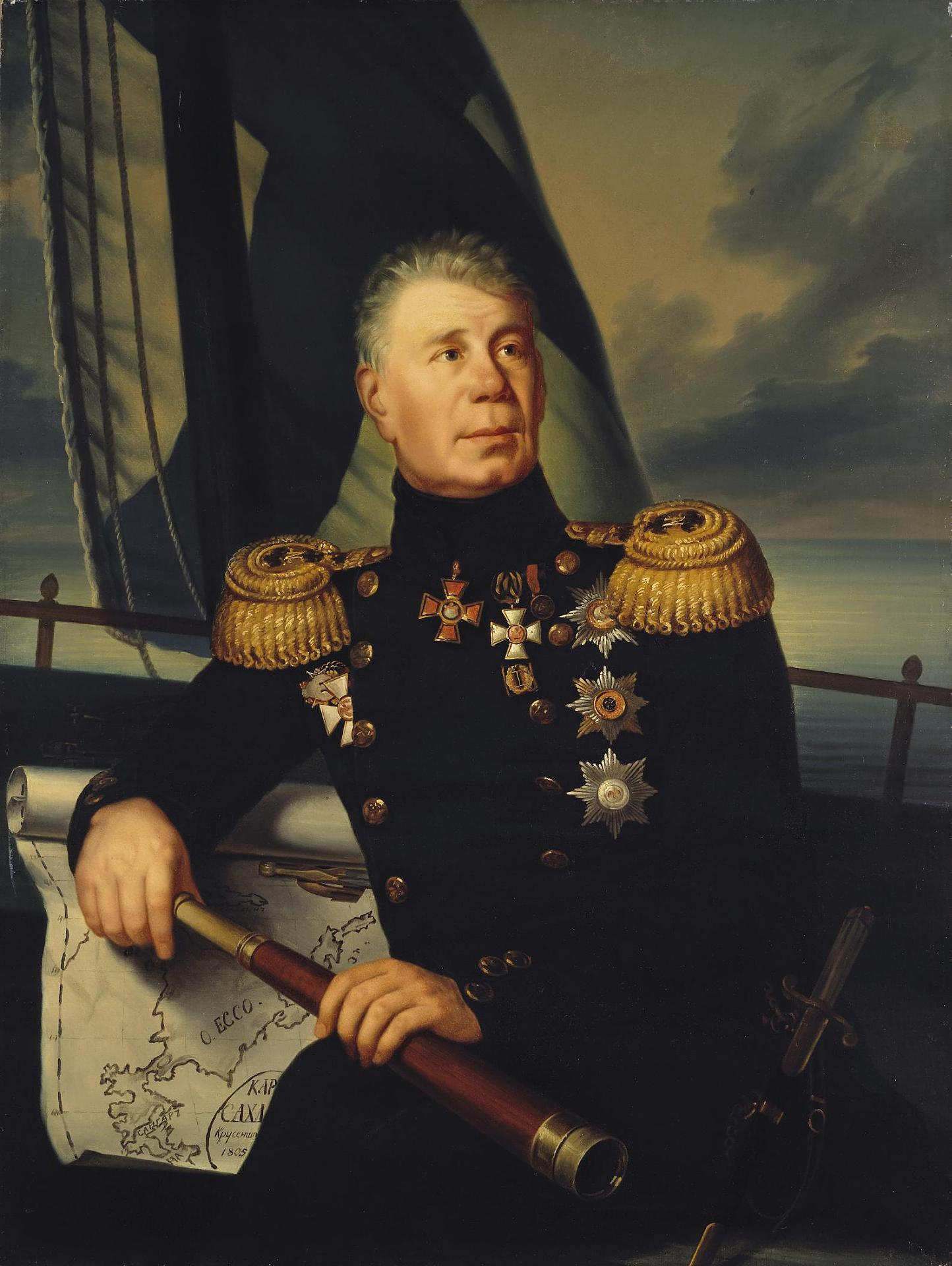
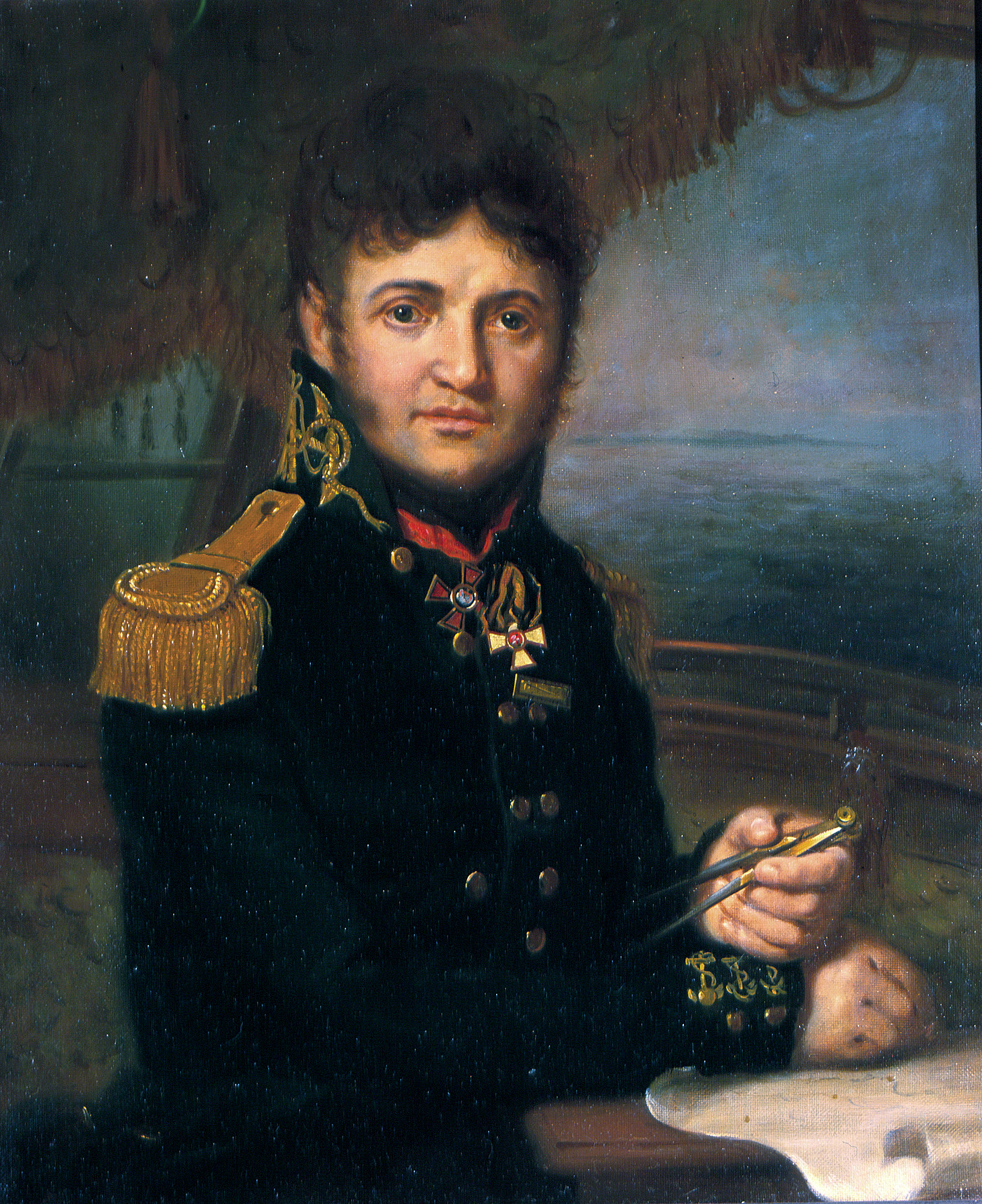
Krusenstern and Lisyansky

Expedition vessels arrived in Kronstadt on June 5, 1803. Krusenstern examined them and concluded that the Nadezhda's rigging and two masts needed replacement. While loading cargo, the ship almost capsized. Repairs were carried out by July 6. The expedition went to the Kronstadt raid, where Emperor Alexander I observed both vessels from his personal sloop. However, weather and heavy cargo significantly delayed departure. On August 2, Minister Rumyantsev visited both vessels and ordered them to dump unnecessary cargo during the later stop in Copenhagen. Five people from Rezanov's retinue were suspended from travel. (Note: Among them was Rezanov's relative Lieutenant Okunev, known in St. Petersburg as Duelist, and his removal from the board led to a big scandal. Among others there were midshipman Dzyurkovsky, translator Kosen, students Paulsen and Chachkov, painter Prichitnikov and nine lower ranks.) On the same day, sailor Zahar Usov fell overboard and drowned in the Neva River. The expedition departed at 10 am on August 7. The wind changed again, forcing both sloops to cruise around Gotland until August 10. Crewmates were allowed to receive a pound of beef and a pound of crackers per day, as well as a cup of vodka (for those who did not drink, there was a premium of 9 cents per cup) and a pound of oil per week. For each meal, there was only one main dish. For lunch, shchi with corned beef made from sour cabbage or fish. During the holidays, the crews usually got some fresh meat. For dinner, both crews usually got porridge with butter.

At half-past five on August 17, the expedition reached Copenhagen. The science team boarded and, French cognac for the Russian-American Company was loaded. The sloops successfully weathered a squall on August 19 but had to remain docked while replacing spoiled provisions. This long delay led to the first conflicts between Krusenstern and Rezanov. According to diaries by Levenstern and Ratmanov, the ambassador and his court advisor, Fosse, regularly attended brothels in the city. Count Tolstoy even got an "illness which is characteristic for his age."

The ships' chronometers were recalibrated from August 21 to September 4, at Copenhagen Observatory. At 5 pm on September 8, the vessels went to the sea again. However, a storm from the northwest kept the sloops in Helsingør for the next six days. During this time, both crews consumed fresh meat and greens, as well as two relatively expensive pints of beer every day.

=== The UK and Canary Islands ===
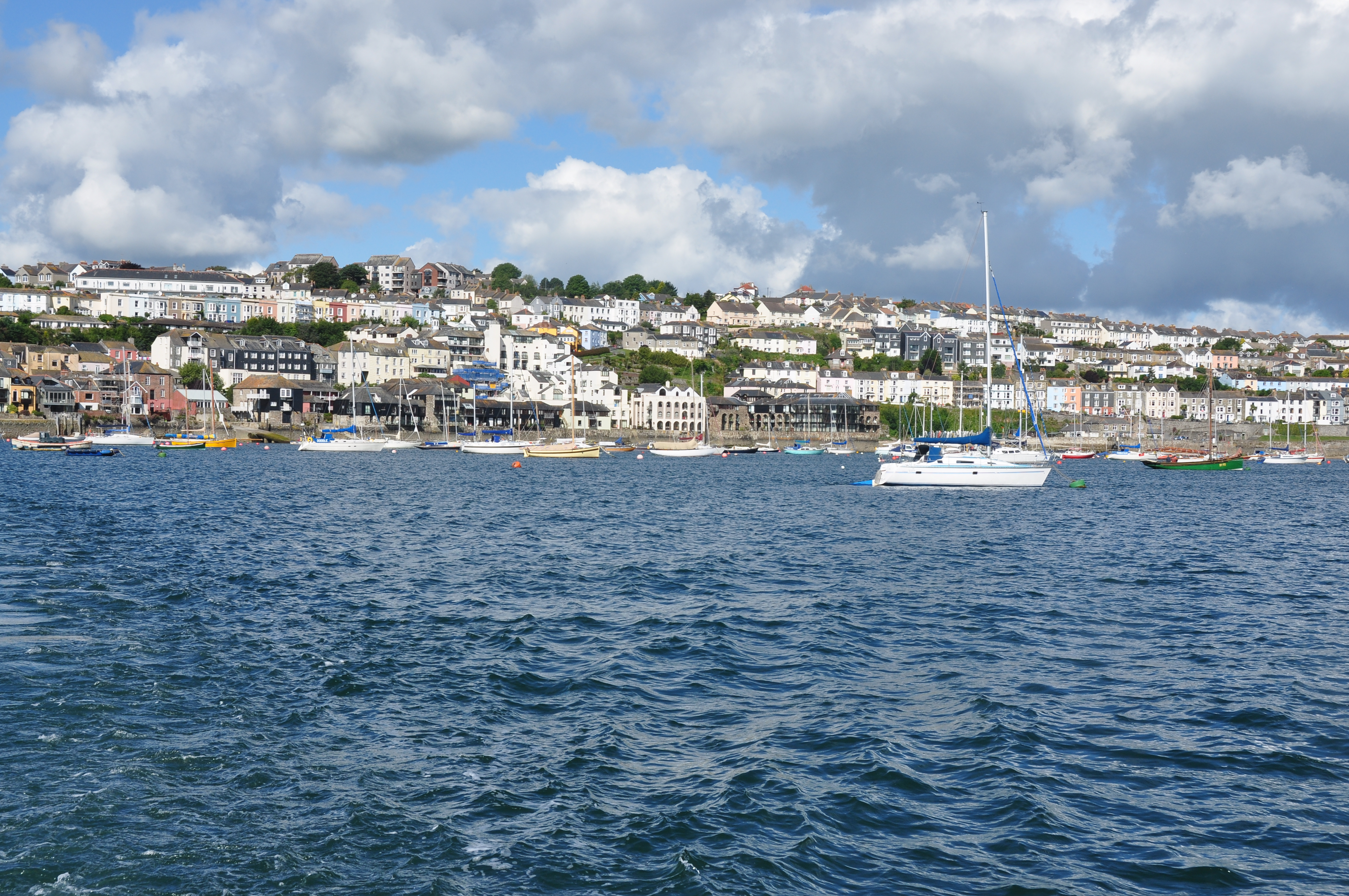
Internal raid and embankment of Falmouth, 2011

Due to intense storms near Skagerrak, the sloops parted. Weather stabilized only by September 20. Fishing on Dogger Bank was unsuccessful. Krusenstern decided to test the "Galsov's machine" (bathometer). However, the sea depth was only 24 fathoms, and the difference between the water temperature at the surface and the bottom was negligible. On September 23, Krusenstern met the English vessel Lavergin, commanded by Beresdorf, a longtime colleague. Beresdorf took Rezanov and astronomer Horner on board to deliver them to London. Krusenstern also sent his nephew Bistrom ashore since his health suddenly worsened. In London, Rezanov and his companion Ermolay Friderici met Count Semyon Vorontsov, went sightseeing and then returned to the Nadezhda via Bath and Bristol.

On September 27, the Nadezhda reached Falmouth, where the Neva awaited her. Provisions of corned beef were restocked. Krusenstern hired caulkers to plug leaks and had fresh water delivered. Both supplies and water cost around 1,170 piastres. Despite repairs, the lower decks and holds of both of the ships remained damp. To mitigate the dampness, the crews opened hatches, filled braziers with burning coals, and employed vinegar and burning sulfur. Twice a week, the crews washed the gutter at the bottom of the hold with fresh seawater and pumped out stagnant water with bilge pumps. After getting to the sea, Lisyansky insisted that sailors wash twice a week, and every incoming shift in tropical latitudes would be doused in seawater.

Rezanov returned late from London on October 5, and the vessels headed to the Canary Islands. On October 8, the temperature increased to 14 °Ré (17.5 °C). On October 10, the crews observed a significant bolide in the constellation of Sagittarius. Because the sea was calm on October 13, Horner and Langsdorff carried out oceanographic measurements and lowered the bathometer to 95 fathoms. On October 19, they reached Tenerife, where they met a French privateer passing by. The vessels headed to Santa Cruz de Tenerife at 11 am on October 20, where the Neva was damaged on the rocks.

Since restocking was complicated, the expedition stayed in Tenerife until October 27. The crews bought fresh vegetables and fruits, potatoes and pumpkins, and four butts of Canarian wine. In total, this cost 1200 piastres. During that time, observational instruments were placed in the Palace of the Inquisition. Measurements of the harbor were completed by October 22. Almost all the crew members were struck by the poverty of the local population, as well as by the dominance of the Spanish Inquisition. Due to constant theft, the commanders banned local citizens from the ships. Before departure, Rezanov named himself the head of the expedition, leading to the first open conflict between him and Krusenstern. Later, Ratmanov wrote in his diary that at that time, Rezanov apologized, but later wrote a complaint to the emperor. Count Tolstoy reported this to Krusenstern, who started to talk to officers one by one about his authority on the ship.

==== Equator ====
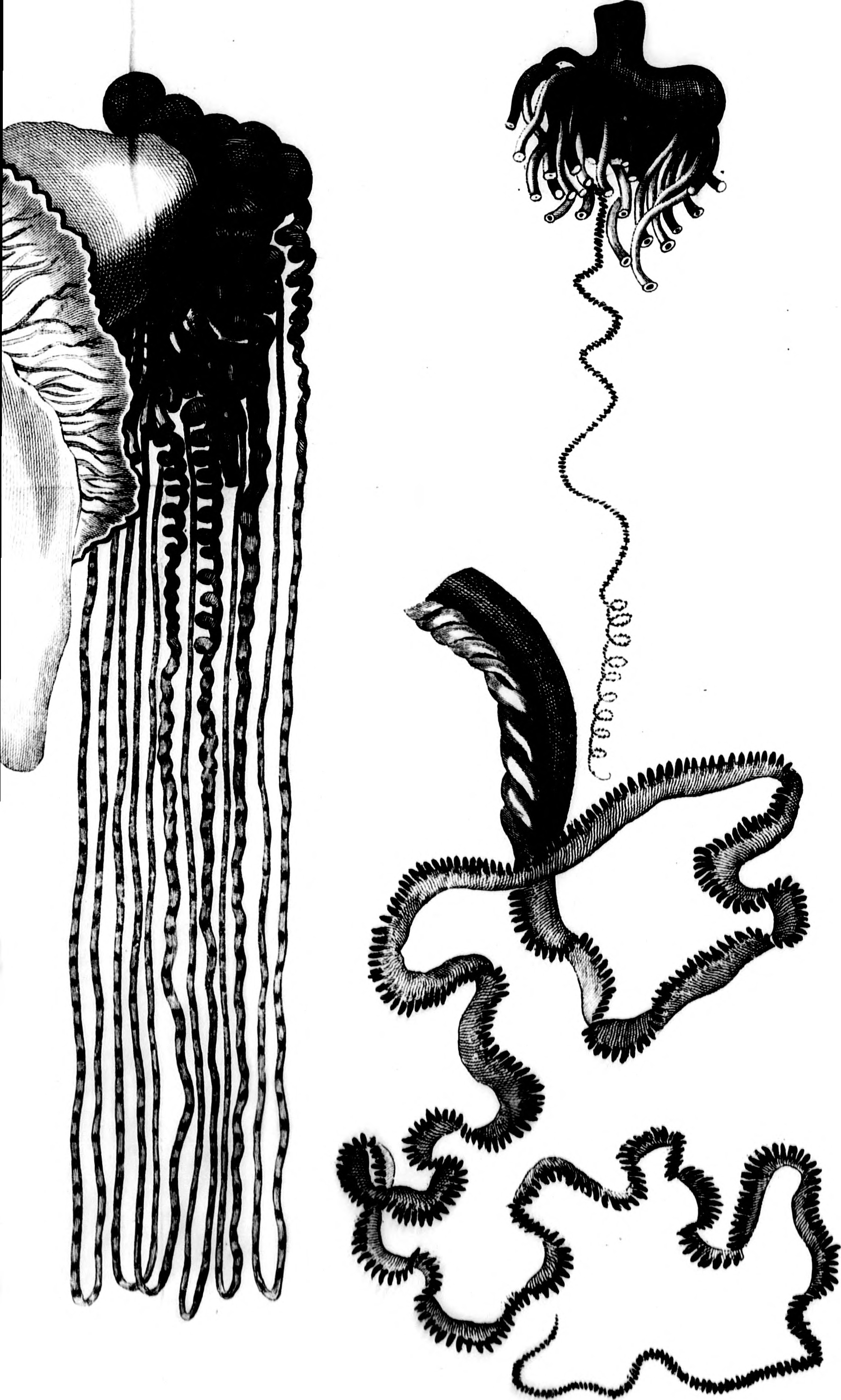
Marine invertebrates. Engravings from the atlas that describes Krusenstern's expedition

The Spanish governor saw the ship off to Cape Verde on October 27. The crew was split into three shifts of 15 people. On November 6, they passed Santo Antão island by roughly 25 miles. After entering equatorial waters, the crews stretched awnings on the quarterdecks, and the sailors were forbidden to sleep outdoors. The weather was humid, with little sun, and the temperature could reach 22-23 °Ré (27.5—28.7 °C). Krusenstern fed the crew with potatoes and pumpkins, half a bottle of Canarian wine, and weak a punch with sugar and lemon juice. Frequent rains supplied potable water. The stretched awning was turned into a pool, which up to 20 people at a time could use. Naturalists discovered the reason for the Milky Seas effect – Langsdorff observed microscopic invertebrates and refuted the prevailing chemical theory.

The ships crossed the equator on November 26, with a ceremony on November 27. Krusenstern, who had crossed the equator before, conducted the ceremony. The parade with an artillery salute was staged on both ships. Lisyansky requested a soup with potatoes and pumpkins for the Neva crew, to fry duck and to bake pudding, and to grant one bottle of porter for every three people. On the Nadezhda, quartermaster Ivan Kurganov, who "had excellent abilities and gift of speech" dressed up as Neptune and gave vodka to the crew that got "pretty drunk" afterwards. Rezanov, too, "came to the quarterdeck, wallowed along, raised [his] arms and legs to the sky, [and] constantly shouted 'hurray!' to Krusenstern."

After reaching 20° south, Krusenstern searched in vain for Ascension Island. Lisyansky agreed to the search because it did not require deviating from the main course. It was impossible to determine the island's position, and the sailors considered it nonexistent. According to another version, both captains perfectly knew the island's location and were seeking the archipelago Trindade and Martim Vaz.

=== Brazil (December 1803 — February 1804) ===
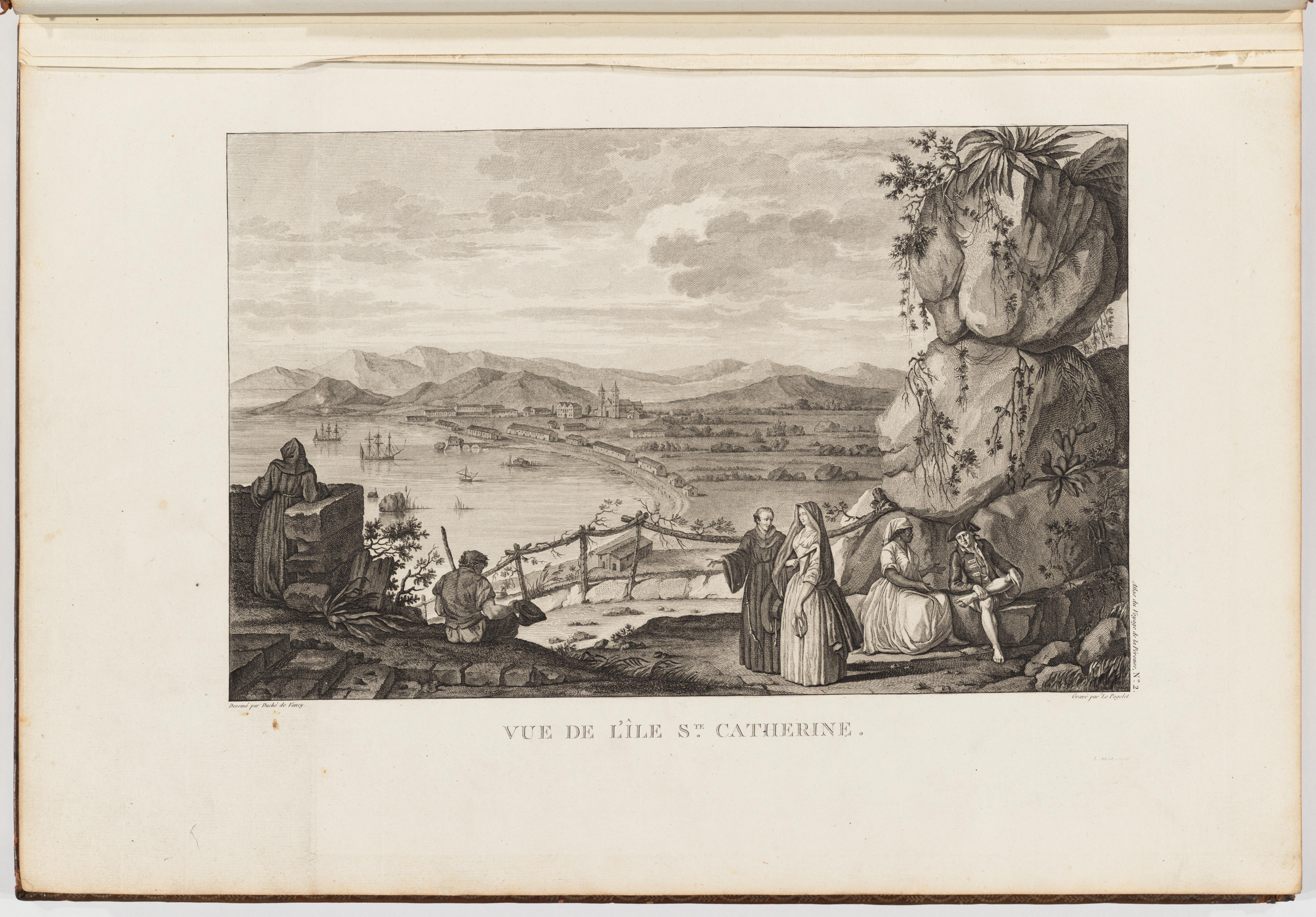
View on the Saint Catharina Island. Engraving from the description of Laperouse voyage, 1792

Following the example of Laperouse, Krusenstern entered Brazil through the port Florianópolis, which, compared to Rio de Janeiro, had a softer climate, freshwater, and cheaper food and tariffs. On December 21, the sloops moored off at Santa Cruz fortress. Governor Joaquim Xavier Curado warmly welcomed Rezanov, Krusenstern, and Lisyansky. In addition to assigning Portuguese officials to the sloops, all the necessary preparations were made on both ships, including chopping wood for the crew. Ambassador Rezanov and his retinue stayed with the governor while Horner was allowed to set up his observatory on Atomiris island.

The Neva's fore and mainmast and the main grotto were replaced in Brazil. The vessel was unloaded, pulled ashore, and thoroughly caulked. Suitable mahogany was found in the island's forests, but it was challenging to deliver it to the harbour for processing. Overall, repairs cost around 1,300 piastres.

During the 5-week stay, the crew explored the natural world and customs of the island. Levenstern, Krusenstern, and Ratmanov were outraged by the sight of slavery. Levenstern wrote that in the governor's summer house, where the retinue was staying, instead of a guard dog, there was a slave gatekeeper "who must himself seek food and not go away for a minute. Killing a black does not count as a murder here." Ratmanov even wrote that "Brazilian nature" disgusts him, and he could only go into town three times. Langsdorf, who knew Portuguese, was highly interested in everything: maté consumption, the damage that cassava might cause to teeth, how local indigenous people hunted, and learning to spin cotton. However, due to extreme heat and humidity, most of his botanical specimens were mouldy and rotted, and ants ate his collected insects. Officers even went to the Brazilian Carnival, where they noticed that white people "have fun as European Catholics" did, while Black people had fun "as Africans" would.

In Brazil, the conflict between Krusenstern and Rezanov took a new turn. On December 28, Rezanov prohibited Count Tolstoy from going onshore. The prohibition was later annulled by Krusenstern. On December 29, the commander called an officers' meeting where he addressed the boundaries of the ambassador's powers for the first time. Officers assured him they would not heed the "orders of the ambassador that does not serve the emperor, the expedition, or the Russian American company." Rezanov tried and failed to bully Lisyansky. On December 31, officers drafted a letter for Count Tolstoy to protect him from the ambassador's attacks. After that, the situation calmed down. During repair work on January 27, Krusenstern ordered to fence off Rezanov's space in their shared cabin. Tolstoy also quarrelled with painter Kurlyandov, and they almost organized a duel. Kurlyandov complained to Krusenstern, and the former reconciled them; however, it was not enough for the painter, so he went to Rezanov for help. The conflict between the two went unresolved for seven weeks.

=== Crossing the Pacific Ocean (February – June 1804) ===
==== Neva on the Easter Island ====
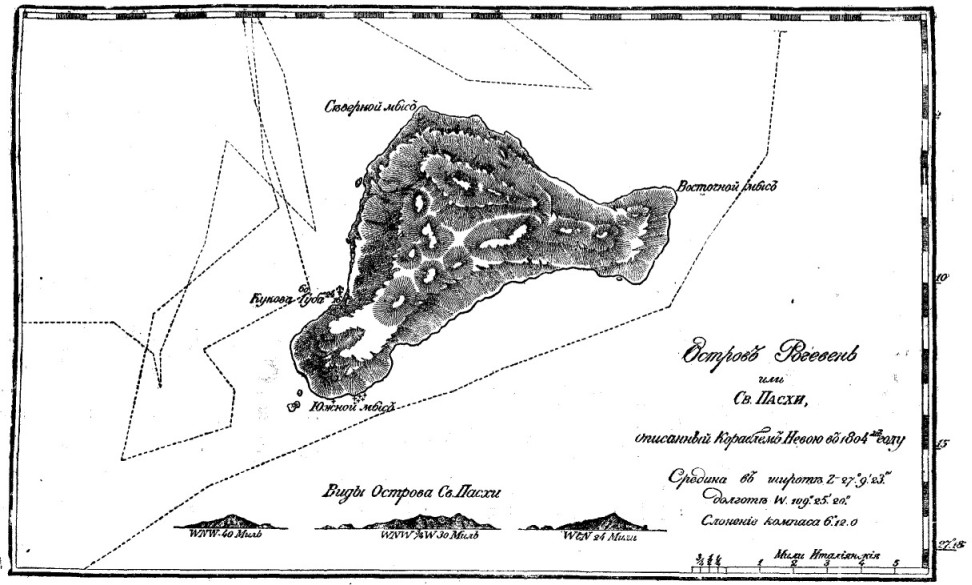
Easter Island and the routes of the Neva on Lisyansky's map, 1804

All repairs were completed on February 2, 1804, and Rezanov returned to the vessel. In his honour, the governor of Curado gave a salute of 11 salvos. The departure was delayed until February 4 by strong wind. According to the initial expedition plan, vessels would round Cape Horn in January. If the plan to split up the vessels was impossible, the expedition would have to head to Concepción, then Hawaii. In addition to the "Roaring Forties," there was also a freshwater shortage, which was supposed to last four months. On February 7, Krusenstern introduced strict rationing – two caps of water per person (including water used for cooking food and making tea). Vessels approached the latitude of Cape Horn on February 25 but headed south to avoid the coastal cliffs. Only on February 27, the Nadezhda's jib was torn apart, and the Neva's tacking was unfolded. In the cold (no more than 3 °Ré or 3.75 °C), the crewmen received winter clothes. Lisyansky ordered the cooking "dried broth" pea soup and gave more pumpkins, onions, and salted food. The expedition reached the Pacific Ocean on March 3.

During a storm on March 25, the vessels lost sight of each other. Since the closest shore was Valparaíso (1000 nautical miles East), Lisyansky decided to head for Easter Island. The storm on March 28-29 was so strong that Lisyansky changed his sceptic and agnostic view of the world, pondering God and Providence in his diaries. When the weather stabilized on April 1, a forge was installed on the Neva's deck, and the crews began to forge axes, knives, and nails for future exchange with the natives. The Neva reached the island at 1 am on April 15. After giving a volley to "clean up the guns," the battery was equipped with warheads. The Neva was near the volcano Katiki and Cape Roggeven. The crew could see moai and cultivated plantations. Due to fog and heavy surf, the ship cruised off the coast for the next four days. Since anchor was impossible, on April 21, Lisyansky sent Lieutenant Povalishin with gifts for the islanders (knives, bottles, etc.) and to leave a message for Krusenstern in case the Nadezhda approached the island. Povalishin took a navigator, and four sailors with him. Clerk Korobitsyn noted that the islanders willingly gave away food for mirrors, scissors, and knives. A bottle sealed with wax and a note to Krusenstern was also handed over. Povalishin received a full boat of products, as well as some ethnographic objects, in particular, a patterned mat. Concluding the description of the island, Lisyansky corrected the coordinates and calculations of the number of Paschal people that the Cook made.

==== The island of Nuku-Hiva ====
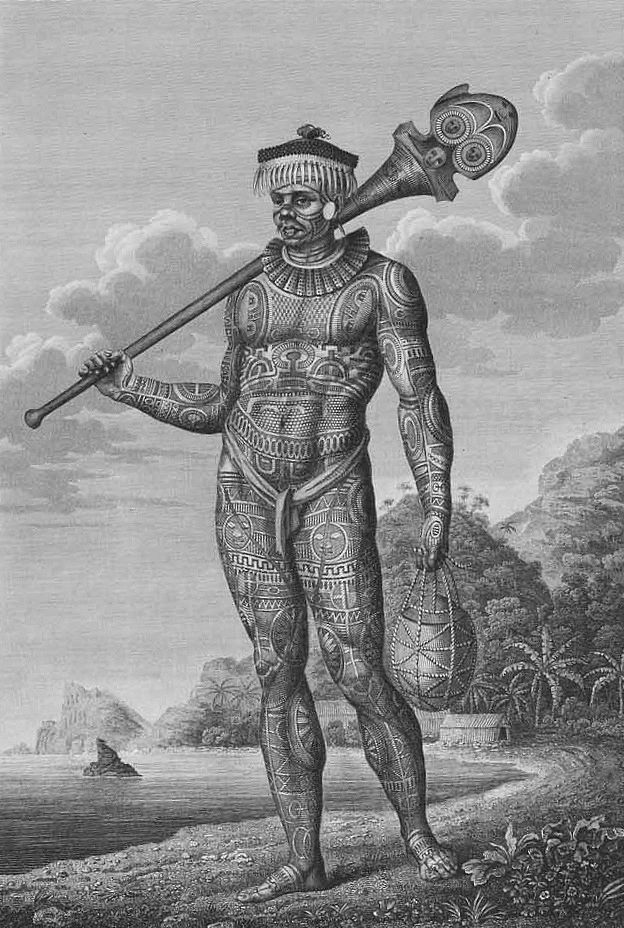
Tattooed warrior from the Nuku-Hiva commune. Engraving by Tilesius.

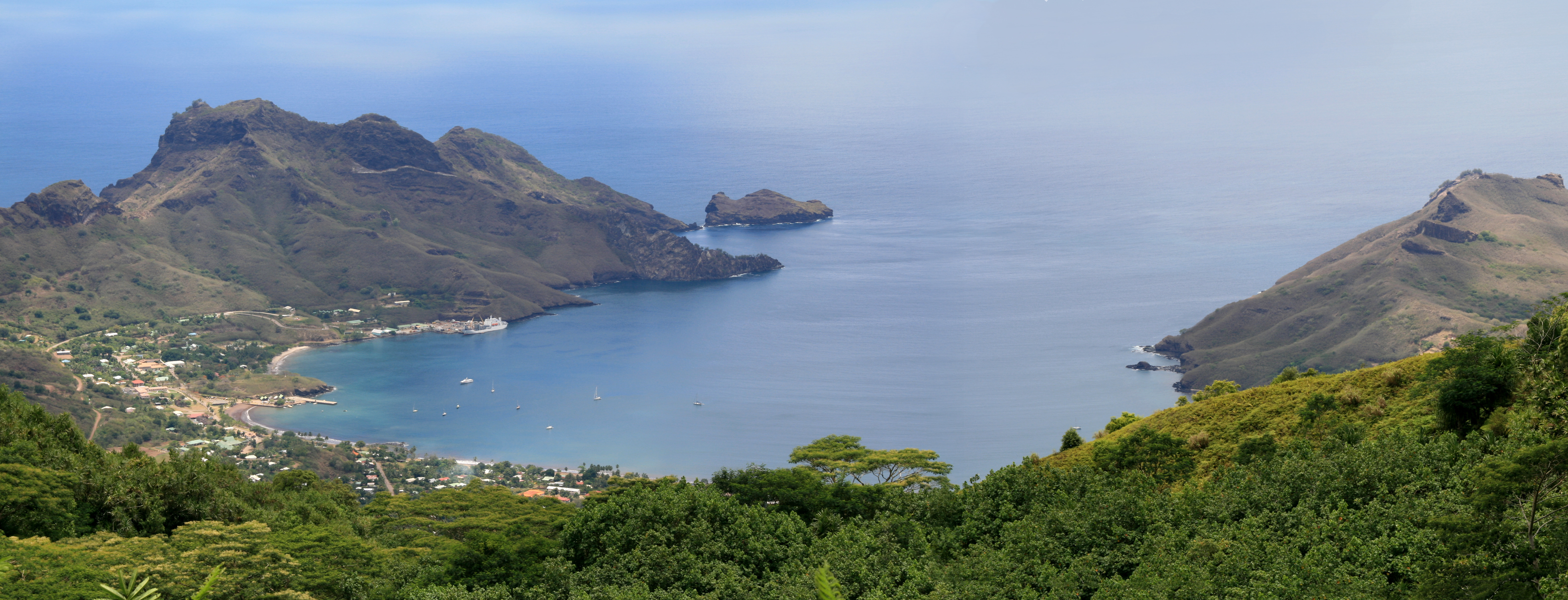
Tayohae Bay on Nuku Khiva, 2006

A storm forced the ships to part until March 31, with the weather stabilized by April 8. The first warm day on the Nadezhda was on April 10.

Count Tolstoy organized training while some of the crew repaired sails. Doctor Espenberg conducted a thorough medical examination and concluded that despite the taxing conditions, all the crewmen were healthy. Since Rezanov insisted on immediate delivery of the RAC cargo, Krusenstern decided to head to Nuku-Hiva, bypassing Easter Island. The blacksmith was set to forge nails, knives, and axes to trade with the Polynesians. On April 17, the vessel crossed the tropic of Capricorn. Only after that, prevailing trade winds brought the vessel back on course. After a heavy storm on May 5, the crew spotted the Fatu-Hiva, Hiva Oa, and Ua Huka islands. Due to fog, the ship had to lower all sails and reached Nuku-Hiva around 5 pm.

Krusenstern and his crew spent 11 days on the Washington islands (Marquesas Islands) from 7 to 18 May, 1804. They settled on the Eastern shore on April 24. Krusenstern decided to use Anna-Maria Bay (Tayohae) as a base. The local tribe was led by a separate leader. Krusenstern contacted the leader of Kiatonui ("Tapega") thanks to an Englishman named Roberts, who was the leader's son-in-law.

The expedition struggled to find fresh water and provisions. Krusenstern wrote that local tribes offered them coconuts, bananas, and breadfruit. The crew sold the locals five-inch iron barrel hoops, which were abundantly stocked for this purpose. The islanders sharpened them and made blades for axes or tesla. On May 11, the Neva reached the island. Lisyansky met Krusenstern and the leader of Katonui. The crews could not obtain fresh meat because the locals had few pigs. They secured only four pigs and three piglets, which were immediately eaten. On May 12, there was an incident: the leader of Katonui lingered at the Nadezhda, and his tribe, thinking he was in danger, took out their weapons. At that time, sailors were conducting freshwater, and the islanders dumped out full barrels and carried them away through the surf.

To prevent incidents (taking into consideration the number of cannibals on the island), Krusenstern and Lisyansky prohibited crew members from visiting alone. They were only allowed to go ashore in organized groups that officer led. Botanist Brinkin never went ashore out of fear of cannibals. Most other members of the scientific group took the islanders' customs for granted. Even though Europeans had previously visited Nuku-Hiva, there was no epidemic of sexually transmitted diseases on the island.

Krusenstern organized for crew's entertainment: according to Levenstern's description, a signal would be sent to any interested women on the island, who could board one at a time and "search for a mate." In the morning, the captain counted those who departed. Crewmen described Polynesian sexual customs (guest marriages and polyandry). Langsdorff alone noticed that only women of lower social status served as seafarers. Krusenstern and Ratmanov were disappointed by the appearance of local women. The combat officer noted that Polynesians are "ugly" and do not correspond to the descriptions of Bugenvil or Foster. The captain wrote only that European canons of beauty differ from the Marqesian ones. Tilesius and Langsdorff met native aristocrats during the excursions along the coast and noted their harmony, manners, and clothing.

The crew became interested in local tattooing practices. The Marquesians tattooed the whole surface of their bodies, including the head, similar to the Māori people. Members of the expedition requested tattoo artists to write in European languages, and even Krusenstern tattooed the name of his "desperately admired" wife on his arm. Ratmanov tattooed a French inscription over his heart, and Count Tolstoy also got his first tattoo here.

On Nuku-Hiva, Krusenstern and Rezanov fought again. When the Nadezhda arrived at the port, Anna-Maria, Krusenstern prohibited the exchange of the RAC's axes for local rarities (pieces of jewellery or weapons) in the hope of saving them for buying more pigs later. He used the example of George Vancouver who did the same during his expedition to Tahiti. Rezanov and Shemelin violated the order, forcing Krusenstern to introduce free exchange again on May 9. Iron hoops deprecated in value, making it nearly impossible to buy pigs. Rezanov also ordered Shemelin to exchange as many rarities as possible for the Kunstkamera collection. On May 13, Shemelin bought a signal shell, a human skull, and several folding knives. On May 14, Rezanov and Krusenstern had an open argument in which Shemelin and Lisyansky participated. The ambassador called the captain's actions "childish" and said collecting artifacts was a direct order from the emperor. Krusenstern replied that he owed no deference to Rezanov. Officers from both vessels demanded Rezanov to provide public clarifications and demonstrations of the official instructions, while Rezanov could not remember the name of the man who delivered the instructions (Count Rumyantsev).

Lisyansky wrote to Krusenstern the next day, saying, "Before today I considered myself in your command [as captain], but now it turns out that I have another commander." Ratmanov even claimed that after Rezanov's proclamation that "he is everything and Krusenstern is nothing" the ambassador had no documents to prove it.

On Nuku-Hiva, Krusenstern described a harbour to the southwest, which he called the port of Chichagova. A flurry blew before the departure on May 17. Neva managed to leave the bay under sails, but the Nadezhda barely squeezed free. A Frenchman named Cabri accidentally got on board (he was staying for a night and feared swimming to shore in the storm). Later, he claimed that Krusenstern forced him stay with force. He later returned to Europe through Kamchatka, Siberia, and St. Petersburg. Trying not to aggravate any conflict, Rezanov voluntarily stayed in his half of the captain's cabin until the ship arrived in Kamchatka.

==== Shared voyage to Hawaii ====
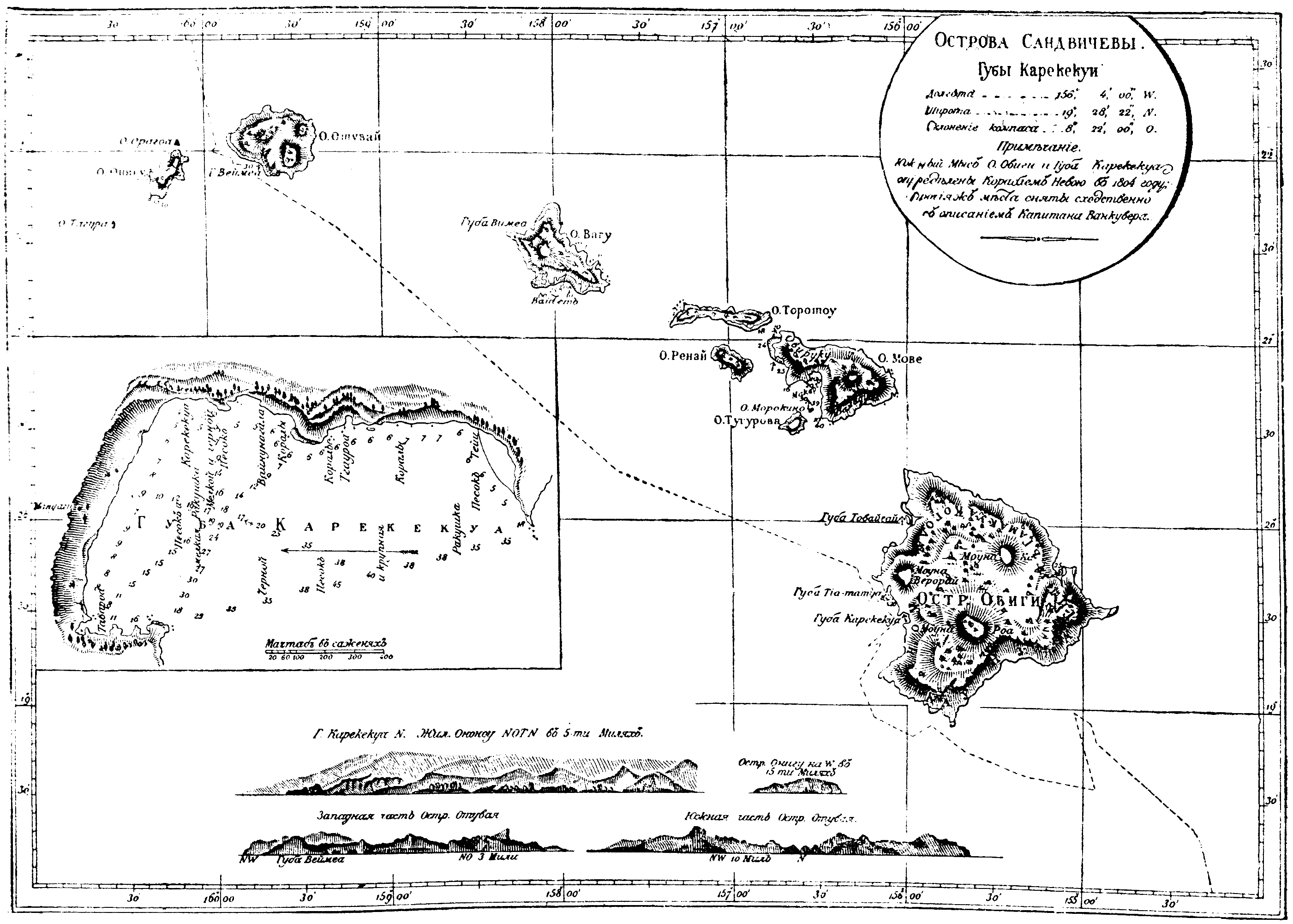
The route of Neva nearby Hawaii, 1804

The vessels needed to stop in the Hawaiian Islands on the long route between Nuku-Hiva and Japan. Krusenstern feared a possible scurvy outbreak even though no one showed signs of the disease. Just in case, Lisyansky started to hunt sharks. On May 20, Lisyanky prepared shark meat for the Neva crew; only the captain disliked the new dish. When the weather had stabilized, members of the expedition resumed their oceanographic observations and crossed the equator again on May 25. On May 30, Johann Neumann, who served as the personal cook of Count Rezanov, died. Initially, Krusenstern had not wanted to take him because Neumann was already ill with consumption. In his diary, Ratmanov mentioned that Rezanov forced Neumann to go. In Brazil, Krusenstern suggested paying Neumann 1.5-year salary early so Neumann could stay in Santa Katharina where his health might have improved. However, Neumann decided to travel further and rapidly lost strength. He was buried according to maritime custom. Hieromonk Gideon refused to attend the ceremony because Neumann "was not even a Lutheran"; Neumann was likely Jewish.

On June 8, Hawaii was sighted. Locals paddled to the ships and suggested some trades. That night, the sloops drifted near the coast. On June 9, the Hawaiians brought out a pig, but the deal fell through because they asked for clothes that the crews did not have. The Nadezhda sprung a leak as her reserves depleted, and decayed caulking on the waterline scattered in the air. Sailors had to pump off the water sometimes twice a day. Krusenstern was horrified by the poor health of the Hawaiians, who were riddled with diseases (sexually transmitted or dermatitis caused by excessive use of cava). Cabri, who wanted to leave and return to Nuku-Hiva, also disdained the "scabby Hawaiians" (as described by Levenstern) and decided to continue to Kamchatka. After reaching Kealakekua Bay, Krusenstern ordered Espenberg to conduct a thorough medical examination. Without making new trades, on June 10 at 8 pm, the Nadezhda returned to the sea.

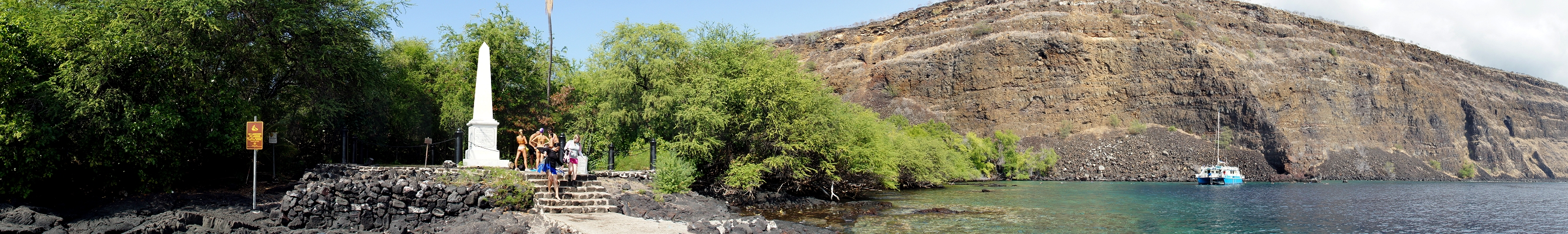
The monument on the place where James Cook died. Kealakekua Bay, 2017

The Neva remained in Hawaii until June 16. After landing, the crew discovered an Englishman, Jung, who led all local businesses because the local leader had moved to Oahu. On June 12, negotiations began. The crew bought two pigs and some roots in exchange for axes and rum. Officers and sailors bought various local crafts. The native Hawaiians claimed that Jung banned the sale of pigs. However, despite the prohibition, the Hawaiian foreman offered pigs, goats, hens, and a barrel of sweet potatoes, as well as taro, coconuts, and sugarcane. Lisyansky prohibited women from entering the ship. Lisyansky visited the place of Cook's death, a local temple, the local leader's house, and the shipyard, where locals were completing the construction of a double canoe.

Since the local leader imposed a taboo on the Russians, the locals stayed away from them. On June 14, Jung arrived at the vessels, but it turned out that he had not been notified about the Russians' presence. Lisyansky did not invite him for dinner. After that, the Englishman gifted two large pigs to the crew and tried to make amends for his impoliteness, even conducting a detailed tour for the group. On June 15, American fishermen approached the Neva and notified the commander about the battle of Sitka. On June 16, the crew bought 8 pigs from Jung and 4 from the Hawaiian foreman in exchange for a canvas. After that, Lisyansky calculated that they could reach Alaska. On June 17, the Neva sailed for Maui. After visiting Kauai on June 20, Lisyansky set the route to Unalaska Island.

=== Nadezhda on Kamchatka, Sakhalin and in Japan (July 1804 – 1805) ===
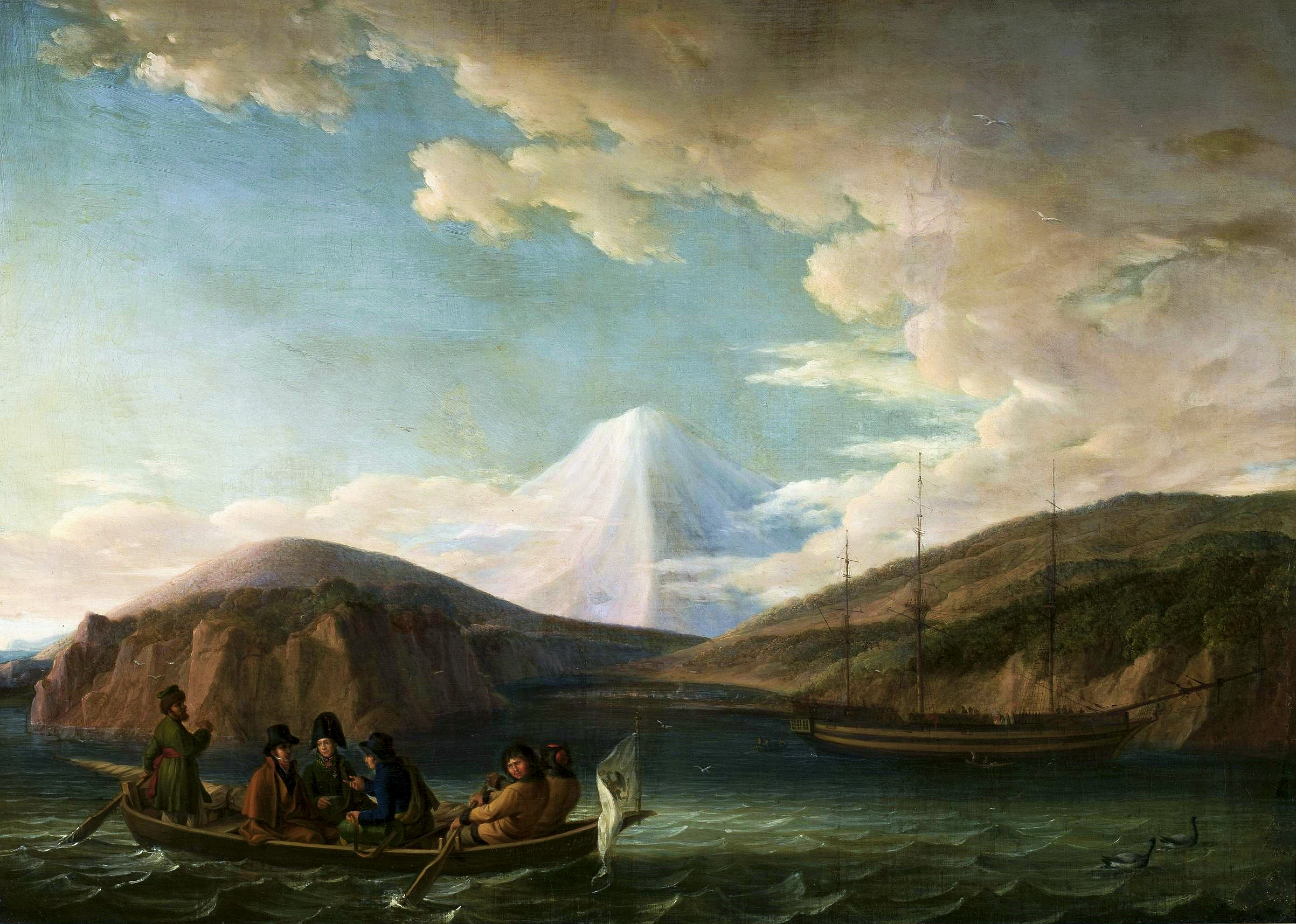
Friedrich Georg Weitsch. Krusenstern's crew in Avacha Bay, stored in the National Museum, Warsaw

==== Petropavlovsk-Kamchatsky. Equipping the embassy to Japan ====
Krusenstern constructed the route to Kamchatka; thus, it would not lag for more than 100-120 miles from the original route paved by James Cook. On June 22, the vessels crossed the tropic of Cancer and got to a two-week calm, during which the ocean's surface was mirrored, which the captain had previously observed only in the Baltic. Using the perfect weather conditions, Horner and Langsdorf started to measure the temperature at different sea levels and to catch marine animals, particularly jellyfish "Onisius." Following Rumyantsev's instructions, they were also searching for a ghost island supposedly located east of Japan that many unsuccessfully tried to locate starting from 1610. On July 13, Kamchatka's shore became visible. On July 14, the sloop reached Cape Povorotny. Because of the calm, the vessel arrived at Petropavlovsk-Kamchatsky only at 1 pm on July 15, transitioning from the island of Hawaii in 35 days. During that time, only once a person had symptoms of scurvy, needing eight days for a full recovery.

Rezanov and his retinue immediately went ashore and sent a messenger to the governor, Major General Pavel Koshelev, who was at that time 700 miles away in the city of Nizhnekamchatsk. The port commander, Major Krupsky, who settled the ambassador in his own house, took up the arrangement. They fed the crew with fresh bread and fish daily so the team could get back in shape after a 5-months journey from Brazil. The sloop was moored in 50 fathoms from the coast; the goods were brought to the shore while the ship itself was repaired. In his letter to the governor that was sent on the day of the arrival, Rezanov wrote directly, "naval officers rebelled on my board." At the same time, he could not act until the governor returned to the capital of Kamchatka on August 10 – after 26 days of being absent. However, during the unloading of the embassy property on June 30, Rezanov could not stand it and attacked Krusenstern. Judging by Levenstern's description, the ambassador threatened to put all officers in pads (except Golovachev) and hang them.

Accusations made by Rezanov were so severe that Governor Koshelev had to give this case a go. At the same time, no official documentation could prove Rezanov's version of the event. Koshelev decided that the incident was so bad that he called for 30 lower ranks from Verkhnekamchatsk. The only evidence about the governor's role in the incident was a report by Ivan Selifantov sent on August 26 (September 7), 1804 – when Nadezhda headed to Japan. Judging by the document, Kosheleved pulled away from the discussion. According to Levenstern's diary, the Major General told Rezanov that he was a witness, not a judge. In his letter to a vice-minister of Minister of Justice Nikolay Novosiltsev from June 12 (24) 1805, Krusenstern described his version of the events. Captain decided to force the situation and make Rezanov take a position for which he would be responsible. On the day of the trial, when Koshelev was present, Krusenstern handed his sword to the general and demanded his departure to Petersburg. Ratmanov later stated that "the ambassador came to his senses and started to look for an agreement," persuading the captain to go to Japan, after which he would leave the sloop. Partly, this happened because the lieutenant claimed that if Krusenstern left, he would also leave the vessel. Ratmanov thought that the phrase in the Rumyantsev instruction about the subordination of both vessels to Rezanov was written by the ambassador himself.

Then comes the main discrepancy: Rezanov wrote that Krusenstern apologized to him for violating the subordination on board. At the same time, Krusenstern mentioned that Rezanov apologized to Krusenstern. Interpretation of evidence highly depends on the position that the researcher might take. Levenstern and Ratmanov claimed Rezanov apologized, and the officers even consulted if they would accept his apologies. Levenstern later noted that both sides had no choice because the embassy to Japan had to be taken. Thus, both officers and Krusenstern should "suppress all personal grudges, all quarrels, and follow the emperor's will and the aims of the expedition". Eventually, on August 16, the official truce took place. In his letter to the emperor that Rezanov sent the same day, he emphasized Krusenstern's merit as a leader. However, prior to the arrival to Kamchatka, the relationship was highly strained, even though there were no open quarrels.

Before departing to Japan, Count Tolstoy, botanist Brinkin, and painter Kurlyandov went ashore from where they would have to travel back home by land. The main reason for that is that they became outcasts on board. Brinkin, according to Levenstern, committed suicide after returning to St. Petersburg. Kurlyandov got sick on his way home and settled down in Kazan, where he taught in the Kazan Theological Seminary. The question of whether Tolstoy visited America, where he got his nickname, remains confusing. "Wild Frenchman" Kabri was also sent ashore. Rezanov took an "honour guard" on vacated seats: captain of the battalion of Petropavlovsk Ivan Fedorov, lieutenant Dmitry Koshelev – brother of the governor, and eight non-commissioned and privates. They were supposed to return home after the end of the embassy mission. According to the letter of F. Romberg, the "honour guard" received urgently prepared uniforms with gold embroideries on them, while guards bear caps were originally taken from St. Petersburg. They departed on August 30.

==== The unsuccessful embassy to Japan ====
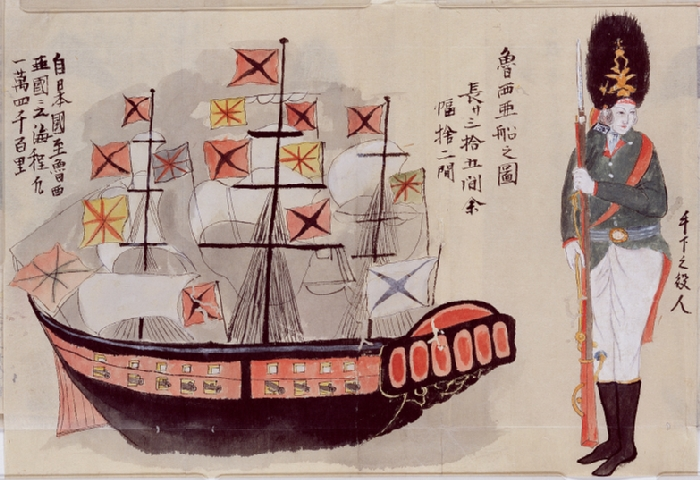
Nadezhda and a guard of honour. Japanese depicture, 1805.

Constant light rain and fog chased the crew in Kamchatka during their first ten days to Japan. On September 11, it transformed into a massive storm. The leak on the board got more prominent, and the crew had to score four bulls that they got on Kamchatka because the animals could not bear the pitching. The first clear day was September 24, and Japan got visible on September 28. Due to a massive storm, the vessels could not get closer, and navigation by Krusenstern and Horner showed that existing maps, even including Aaron Arrowsmith's, were not reliable enough. On October 3, the sloop reached the shore of Satsuma Domain. The local government notified the governor of Nagasaki. Then, the expedition headed to Osumi strait, and first described it since all the existing European maps were redrawn from the Japanese ones. Nadezhda reached the Nagasaki strait around 5:30 pm on October 8. Rezanov had an "open list" from the Batavian Republic and the precept in the name of the head of the Dutch East India Company Hendrick Doof for assisting in maintaining the embassy's mission.

At that time, the Russian authorities did not prioritise relations with the Eastern countries. Rezanov's instruction stated: "make decisions according to Japanese customs and do not abase oneself". The letter from the emperor Alexander I addressed the Shōgun. When the former embassy led by Adam Laxman arrived in Japan, local authorities allowed only one ship to stay in the bay. Under these conditions, Rezanov was supposed to conclude a trade agreement between the two states and initiate trade relations in Nagasaki or in Hokkaido. To endear the Japanese side, it was decided to bring home the Japanese victims of ship wreckage that happened in 1794 near the Andreanof Islands. Rezanov had 50 boxes containing gifts for the Japanese authorities, hoping to interest them in potential items to trade. These were items made from glass and crystal, like chandeliers, candelabras, and ivory vases. Later, Levenstern wrote in his diary that Rezanov and Fosse wanted to sell gifts that were not accepted by the Japanese side because it was a "real crap". Lieutenant also noted that although fox furs were highly valued in Russia, in Japan, they are considered to be a kitsune or "unclean animal". The only thing that caused genuine interest from the Japanese side was the clock (English work) from the Hermitage in the shape of an elephant, which was able to turn the trunk and ears, and the kaleidoscopic lights made by Russian inventor Ivan Kulibin.

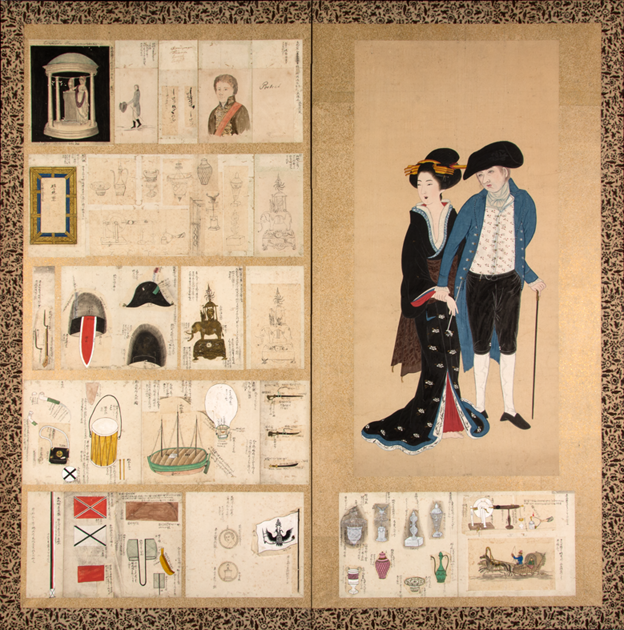
Japanese drawings made to inform the government. They mostly depict gifts (including a clock in the form of an elephant) and household items, and also ambassador Rezanov with Japanese prostitutes, 1805.

Japanese authorities sent translators of the lowest rank to conduct negotiations, who demanded the same ceremonial as the Dutch. Krusenstern, Rezanov, and merchant Shemelin depicted arguments regarding whom and how many times to bow. Levenstern drew Japanese authorities to clarify the types of bowings. Japanese could not understand why Russians resented, assuming that they should obey common rules and follow the example of the Dutch. Storms frayed the Nadezhda, and the vessel desperately needed repair work. The crew even had to agree to disarm the ship and put the whole stock of gunpowder in the Japanese arsenal; they took all the guns and several anchors. Only after small bargaining with the local officials the crew was allowed to keep the swords and the honour guard – guns. Rezanov preached self-humiliation to the crew before the Japanese authorities, but he, answering questions from the Japanese side, behaved arrogantly and aroused many suspicions. As a result, the sloop was transferred to the internal raid in Nagasaki only on November 9 – in a month after the arrival. Due to the extreme restraint of the ambassador, only on December 17 the team was allowed to go ashore. Rezanov was provided with a house and warehouses in Megasaki (street Umegasaki), while the sloop was put for a repair works in Kibati. The ambassador's house was rounded with a bamboo fence, and more resembled a prison. Rezanov, after a year of travelling in extreme conditions when his authority was constantly disputed, did not have a desire and strength to follow Japanese and European vision on diplomatic representation. He constantly scolded his retinue, cursed with translators, and each of his steps was recorded and reported to higher authorities. There were also incidents of another kind: when women were delivered to the embassy, Rezanov complained that locals use teeth blackening. Authorities resented him, and said that "Russians have the same tastes as Dutch".

Sailors on the Nadezhda found themselves in even more cramped position. They were allowed to go ashore only to the one specific spot that was "one hundred and forty steps" long, limited by a fence, and was kept under guard. There were three trees on the site; the ground was covered with sand, only the small arbour covered people from the rain. Overall, it looked like a prisoner walk. Nevertheless, Levenstern claimed that due to the fact that Japanese did not know that it is possible to make triangulation and cartography from the board, for that short period, officers on the Nadezhda were able to conduct more material than Dutch for 300 years. In these conditions, Langsdorf and Tilesius conducted research on climate and ichthyology. To do that, they convinced local fishers that daily delivered them fresh food, to provide them with new biological types every time they come. Later Langsdorf claimed that for the three months that they were in Megasaki, researchers received 400 fish specimen of 150 different origins, that he later draw and described. (Note: according to Japanese biologist Yuko Takigawa that in 2010-2013 researched the Langsdorf's collection, not all specimen were edible and suitable for a household use, and some were even poisonous. In other words, scientist received from fishermen precisely those species that presented some interest to him.) Also, fishers provided him with drawings of local animals. (Note: At that time in Japan was popular a genre of graphic descriptions of animals and plants. The most famous treatise of this kind was "Shurindzu" (Japanese: 衆鱗図) that was created in the middle of the 18th century and consisted of more than 300 types of fish.) Conduction of biological specimen was quite often mentioned in the Levenstern's diary from December 6, 1804, to April 5, 1805: through suppliers or translators they were able to obtain 8 species of snails, 24 species of birds, 16 species of fish for stuffing were obtained (obtaining fresh supplies was described separately). The total weight of the fish alone for the samples was 128 Japanese catti, which corresponded to 4 pounds 32 ounces (78 kg). In January 1805 Langsdorf glued a balloon from silk and paper, which was once run on a leash, despite Rezanov's displeasure. The second launch attempt happened on February 6, and ended up with the ball being ripped off by the wind and thrown onto the roof of one of the city's houses. After that, the scientist switched to flying kites. Other news was not comforting either: of the four returned Japanese, one, Tatsuro, cut off his tongue with a kitchen knife on January 28, and tried to cut his throat. The guards managed to stop him, and the Japanese doctor completely healed the wounds, although it was already impossible to restore his voice.

Even though Rezanov knew the basics of the Japanese language, he did not understand that the Japanese surrounding him were specialists – Rangaku, that is, professional Dutch scholars, experienced, versatile specialists. Ratmanov called them "reasonable beasts". The most famous Japanese scientist that was attached to the embassy was Otsuki Gentaku that later wrote a book about officers and researchers on Nadezhda based on conversations with the crew and those Japanese who returned home. He highly praised the moral qualities and scientific qualifications of Langsdorf. The embassy was closely watched by another famous intellectual and artist Ōta Nanpo. He, in particular, copied South American drawings that were made by the members of the expedition.

The ill-conceived actions of the ambassador significantly complicated the course of negotiations. For instance, Rezanov even tried to fake his disease, blackmailing the governor with the anger of the Russian sovereign. He also demanded Japanese doctors although he had Tilesius and Langsdorf in his retinue who had medical degrees and large practical experience. Japanese doctors visited Rezanov on February 10, 1805, and could not find out any serious diseases. The next day the ambassador proclaimed that by doing that he wanted to demonstrate respect and trust to the Japanese side. There was also another incident: Rezanov much liked Japanese black and gold-plated caskets, and he demanded 500 of them as a deposit before the trade starts. When the trade did not happen, he embezzled them. Finally, on April 4 and 5 Rezanov got an audience with both Nagasaki bugyō and Hida Yoritsune, and also a representative from Edo Toyama Kinsiro. The meeting did not go well; both representatives received the ambassador coldly. Despite the heavy rain, only Rezanov was invited to the tent where the representatives told him that they completely reject any type of trade relations (Note: Ota Nampo wrote in his diary that in two days after Nadezhda left, the head of the Dutch factory organized a huge dinner for Japanese translators and his personnel, where he could not hide his happiness that Russians did get a permission for trade.) On April 7, there was a farewell ceremony where Russian members of the crew expressed a desire to leave Japan as soon as possible. Russian gifts were not accepted, but the Japanese side did take money for the materials that were used for repairing the Russian ship – boards, bars and 500 copper sheets – as well as provision for the crew and the retinue. Following the order of Shōgun, large sums of rice, salt, and silk wool were given to the crew as a gift. The Japanese side also provided Nadezhda with provision for the trip back to Kamchatka: dried bread, powder, sake, salted fish, salted pork, and live cattle. It took ten days with 16-hour working hours to load all provision on board, as well as returned weapons. Leventern accused Rezanov what he embezzled all the received things by the name of "RAC's property" and wanted to sell them in Kamchatka or Kodiak. In the end, officers gave up their part of sault to sailors, and, following the Krusenstern's order, 1228 kg of rice was given to the needed citizens of Kamchatka.

==== Second visit to Kamchatka ====
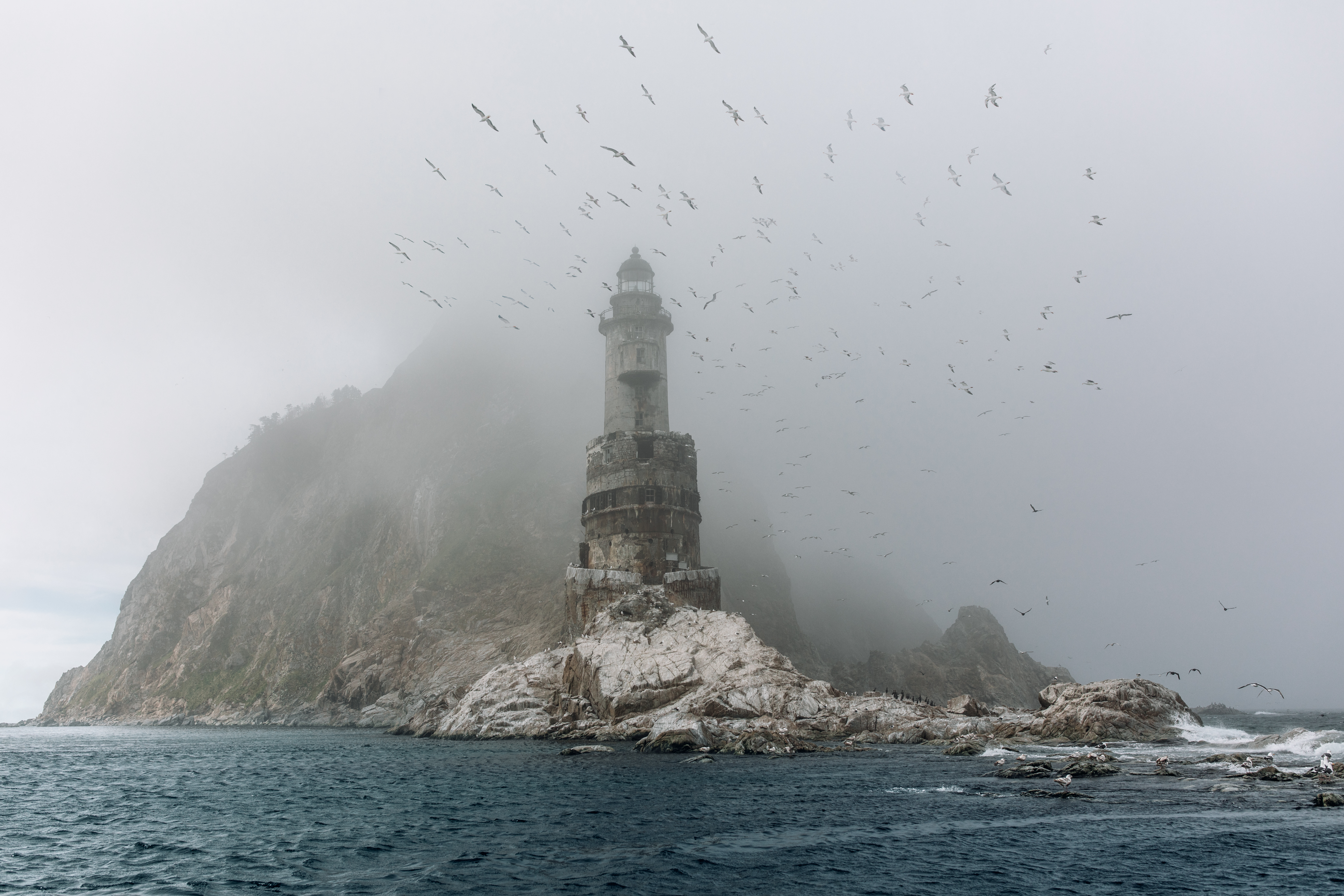
Lighthouse at the Cape Aniva, 2017

Despite extreme discontent of the Japanese authorities, Krusenstern decided to return the embassy in Petropavlovsk through the Sea of Japan – along the west coast of Honshu and Hokkaido which was quite unknown to Europeans. Stormy weather prevailed after the departure. From the Gotō Islands Nadezhda headed North to the Tsushima Island that it passed by on April 19. Only on May 1, the vessel reached the Tsugaru strait. It headed further, primarily because Krusenstern wanted to find the strait (that was drawn on his map) dividing island Esso (Hokkaido) from Karafuto. On May 7-9 Krusenstern realized that Karafuto corresponds to Sakhalin on Russian and French maps. Then the expedition went through the La Pérouse Strait, correcting many mistakes on the maps drawn by Lapérouse. On May 14 Nadezhda anchored in the Aniva Bay. In the morning of May 15, Langsdorf and Ratmanov went describing the shore, and Rezanov and Krusenstern went to local settlement to establishing contact with Ainu people. After talking with them, Krusenstern suggested that their native lands were under the constant Japanese attacks, and it would be highly desirable to establish Russian trading post right there. Ainu treated sailors with rice and fresh fish, from which they prepared pilaf. On May 16, the expedition rounded the Cape of Aniva, and on May 17, it arrived in the Gulf of Patience which was described by lieutenant Golovachev. On May 20 they discovered a cape which was named after Mulovsky. On May 22 they described the Cape of Soymonov. On May 24, powerful fields of perennial ice at 48 °C blocked the path. Coming between the islands of Mussir and Raukokke, the crew discovered four more islands – Lovushki. After a massive storm, on June 1 the expedition passed the islands of Ekarma and Shiashkotan. On June 5, the crew arrived to Petropavlovsk.

During their travel to Kamchatka, the crew on Nadezhda unwillingly participated in the medical experiment – one of the honour guards became infected with a smallpox in Megasaki. He was initially from Kamchatka, where vaccination against the disease was not mandatory. Krusenstern was not so much concerned with a potential epidemic on board (even though there was no opportunity to declare a quarantine), rather than with a possible spread of the disease in Petropavlovsk. After a short investigation, Krusenstern found out that nearly every member of the crew who travelled from St. Petersburg was vaccinated. Espenberg personally vaccinated them, but they did not get infected, from which it was concluded that they "already had a smallpox". Before the arrival to Petropavlovsk, all the property of the recovering soldier (including linen and bunk) was thrown into the sea, soldiers' belongings that were left in Kamchatka were treated with sulfur, and the bunks and belongings of the sailors were washed in boiling water with a bar of soap. After the arrival, infected soldat was put in a 3-week quarantine, while the crew was prohibited from communicating with the locals. By introducing these restrictions, Krusenstern referred to consequences of the smallpox epidemic in 1767.

Later it was found out that Alexander I sent to Krusenstern and Rezanov the gracious rescript dated April 28, 1805. According to the document, Krusenstern was awarded an Order of Saint Anna of the second degree. At the same time, Chamberlain Rezanov received a golden snuff box decorated with diamonds. Both of them received a letter from Rumyantsev in which the count proposed Rezanov to "investigate the American shore from the Kodiak Island to the Bering Strait." Langsdorf also decided to go with the RAC's representative, because he was interested in observing the "natural wealth" of Russian America. The procession left Nadezhda – Fosse was sent with a report to Okhotsk and then to Saint Petersburg by land. Major Friderici was left on the sloop (Levenstern and Ratmanov claimed that there were some rumours about his intimate relationship with Cadet Moritz von Kotzebue). Since Krusenstern planned to explore Sakhalin during the summer, Friderici and Shemelin were landed off in Petropavlovsk. Later they joined the crew again and travelled to Saint Petersburg through China in the fall.

==== Study of Sakhalin. Third visit to Kamchatka ====
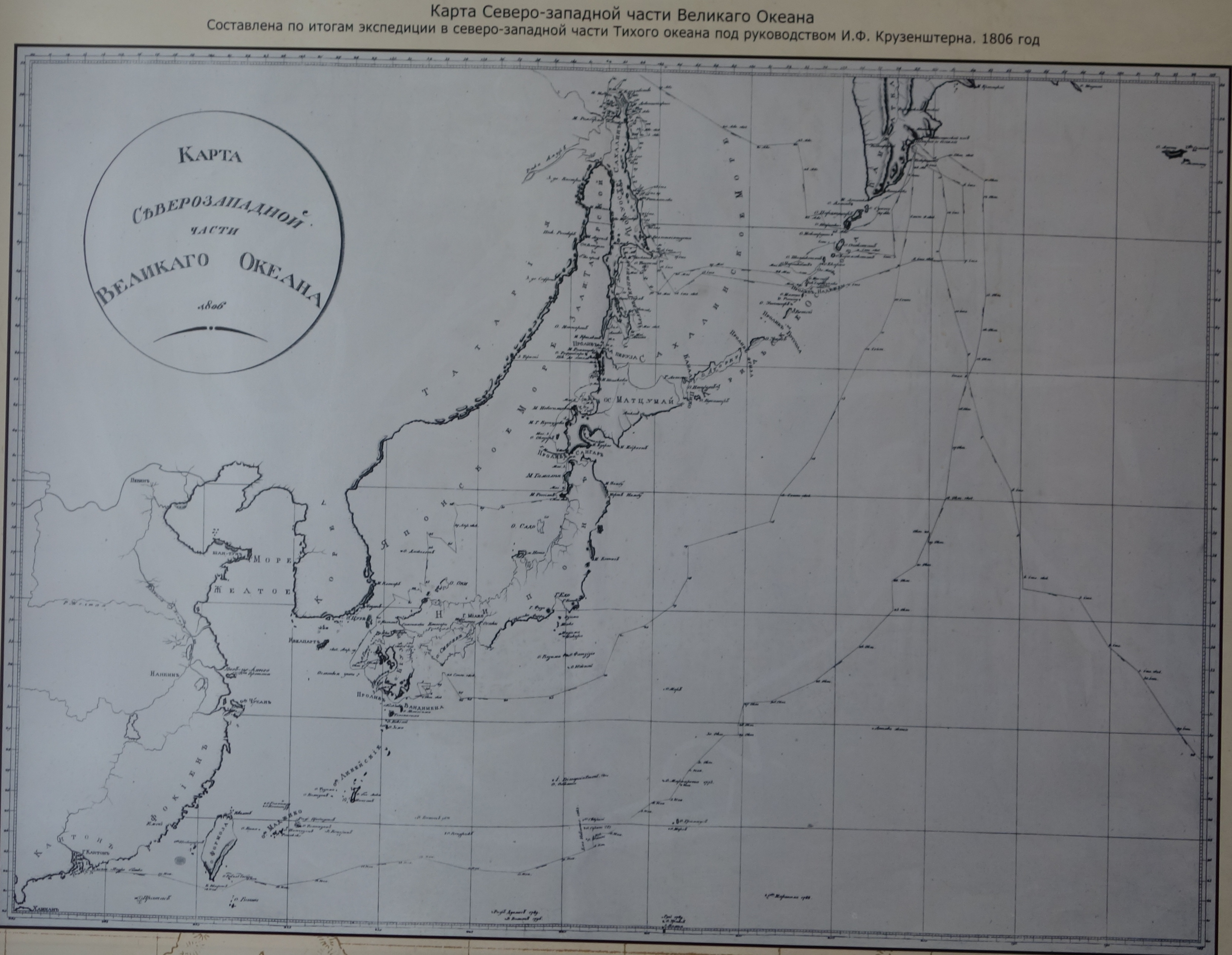
Map of the Krusenstern' routes in the North-Western part of the Pacific Ocean

Ship departure was scheduled for June 21; however, the governor was still on the Northside, trying to establish relations with Chukchi. Besides that, one of the boilers in the galley required repair. On June 25 Rezanov departed to the New World on the vessel Maria. On July 1, governor Koshelev arrived in Avacha Bay. Departure was significantly delayed because Krusenstern found out that Rezanov had written a lot of letters to St. Petersburg. Fearing denunciations and aiming at neutralizing possible consequences, the captain had to get the governor's support.

Reaching the open sea on July 5, Krusenstern first aimed at getting closer to the Lovushki islands, geographic coordinates of which he could not locate before due to cloudy weather. Simultaneously the crew conducted coastal surveys from the Shipunsky Peninsula to Cape Lopatka. However, upon the arrival at the place on July 6, the sloop was again covered with a thick fog. After passing the Nadezhda Strait, they headed to the Cape Gvozdev, surviving the massive storm that turned the marseille apart. Perfect weather for conducting scientific observations stabilized on July 19. Because of that, the crew was able to detect the coordinates of the Cape Gvozdev and found the Cape Bellingshausen. On July 25-29 Nadezhda was again chased with the storm; however, the crew did not know that in this place off the coast of Sakhalin there were neither large shallows nor reefs. Only on August 9, the expedition reached the Northern part of the island with the capes "Maria" and "Elizabeth". Krusenstern thought that the newly discovered northern strait is more suitable and safe harbour than Tenerife or Madeira. There they discovered a settlement of Nivkh people, which Levenstern, Tilesius and Horner decided to visit. However, they met a hostile reception and hastened to retire. On August 12, Nadezhda entered the channel that divided Sakhalin from the mainland. At 11 am on August 13, the coast of the Asian mainland with two mountain ranges was seen, and the width of the strait, as it seemed, did not exceed 5 miles. The water was so fresh that Krusenstern concluded that the mouth of the Amur River is somewhere nearby. As the depth quickly fell, a rowing boat was lowered down, on which lieutenant Romberg measured the bottom. The depth did not exceed 7-8 metres and rapidly decreased closer to the Asian coast. The crew discovered a new cape in the Strait of Tartary that was later called in the name of Khabarov. Due to a strong counter-current, Krusenstern decided not to take any risks and announced that Sakhalin is undoubtedly a peninsula. However, he also added that it would be useful to send the next expedition for exploring 80-100 miles of the Tatar Strait and locating the exact coordinates of the mouth of the Amur. Such expedition was carried out only in 1849 by Gennady Nevelskoy.

Due to mists and storms, exploration of Sakhalin got dragged on, while Nadezhda was supposed to meet the Neva in Guangzhou. An attempt to finish describing the Kuril Islands and Kamchatka failed due to fogs. On August 30 at 3 pm, everyone safely returned to Petropavlovsk:

All this time there were rare days in which rain would not wet us, or foggy moisture penetrate our dresses; moreover, we had no fresh provisions, turning off the fish of the Gulf of Hope, and no anti-zingotic agents; but, in spite of all that, we had not a single patient on the ship.

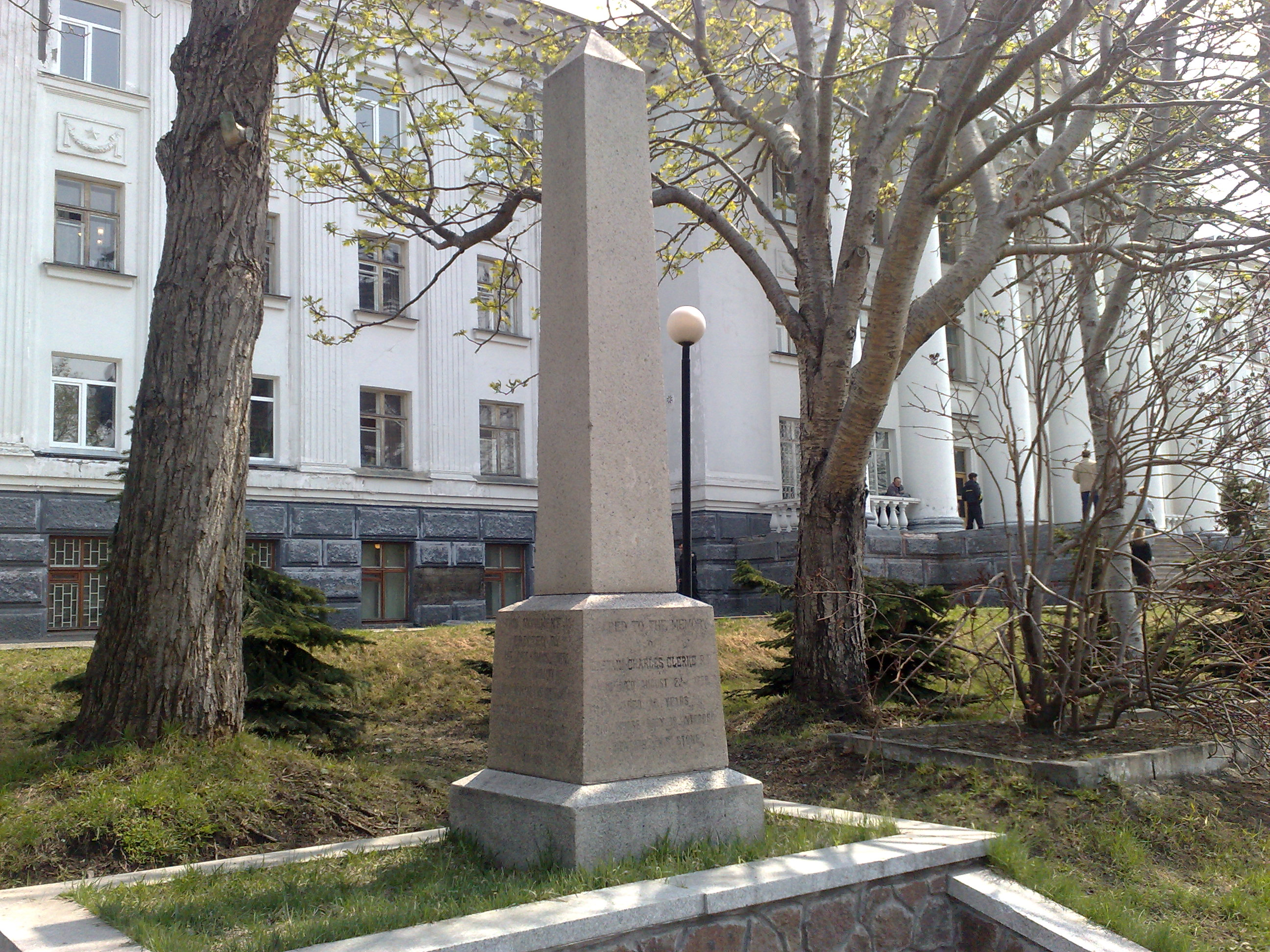
Grave of Charles Clerke, 2009

The news was disappointing: materials and provision that were ordered from Okhotsk had not arrived yet, and only on September 2 the official transport came under the command of midshipman Steingel. It contained post (the latest letters dated on March 1), and also instructions by Rumyantsev that were delivered by the Courier Corps from St. Petersburg in 62 days. Nadezhda needed a complete change of rigging. Ballast and 70 cubic fathoms of firewood for the whole return trip were delivered to the ship. Provision from Okhotsk was bad: the crew took only corned beef for three months (it went bad after six weeks), and crackers for four months, but already in China, they were not even suitable for a livestock feed. Because the works got delayed, officers followed the Ratmanov's initiative and decided to renew the grave of captain Charles Clerke. On September 15, they built up a pyramid made of birch wood, painted marble, and surrounded by a balustrade and a moat. Tilesius painted the coat of arms in the Cook's travel description with an oil paint. Also on September 20, the transport from Unalashka arrived with the news from Lisyansky and a load of furs for sale in China. The governor's brother Dmitry Koshelev delivered food and four bulls (gifts from Kamchatka) to the ship. Finally, on October 5, Nadezhda was dragged to the bay and at 2 pm the vessel reached the open sea.

Before the departure, the crew found out that in 1805 new changes in the merchant flag were introduced. Thus, from Kamchatka to China, Nadezhda travelled with a nine-lane frag – tripled tricolour. These innovations did not last long.

=== Arrival of Neva in Russian America (August 1804 – November 1805) ===
==== Fight for Novo-Arkhangelsk ====
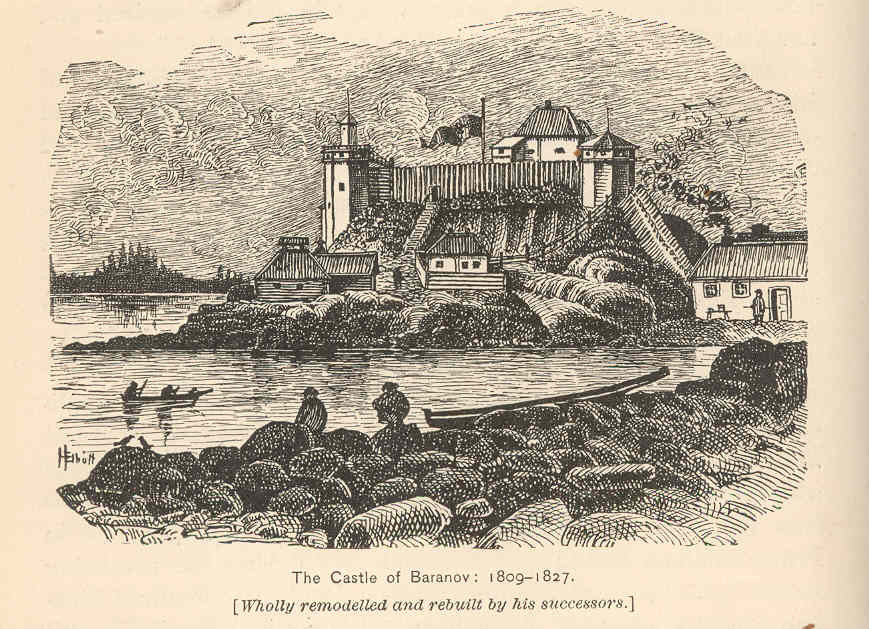
Residence of A. Baranov in Novo-Arkhangelsk

The transition of Neva from Kauai to Kodiak lasted for 25 days. Generally, the trip went calm, except that the weather was rainy and the frosts began to prevail. According to Lisyansky, due to the abundance of fresh pork on board, many people started to suffer from the gastric infection. However, they were quickly cured with quinine. The vessel arrived on July 10. Already in Brazil Hieromonk Gideon had received an order from Rezanov to head the Kodial school and the organization of pastoral activities. Thus, he went ashore upon the arrival in Kodiak. He was supposed to return to Russia with the messenger, not on the Neva.

After the arrival, Neva found itself in the middle of the armed conflict. On July 13 Lisyansky received a request from merchant Alexander Andreyevich Baranov to help in liberating Sitka from Tlingits. Baranov had on his side transport Ermak, 120 armed Russian hunters and industrialists, as well as 800 indigenous allied forces on 350 kayaks. The 14-gun sloop significantly strengthened the squadron. Negotiations with the head of the indigenous population of Sitka – Sitcan toyon Kotlean – failed because Baranov demanded to surrender the fortress and pass on reliable Amanats to Russians. On October 1, 1804, naval guns bombarded the Sitcan fortifications. However, it was not successful since guns' calibre was small, the palisade was thick, and the Indigenous peoples of the Americas took refuge in ditches or underground passages. Thus, Lisyansky landed troops with a field gun, under the command of Lieutenant P. P. Arbuzov. Baranov and Lieutenant P. A. Povalishin with four guns attacked from the other side. Even though Tlingits fired from falconets and rifles, the Russians started the assault. The attempt of frontal attack was repulsed by the Indigenous peoples – Povalishin was injured in the chest, the podlekar Mutovkin received bullet wounds, and seven sailors got wounds of varying severity. Rankers Artemy Pavlov and Andrei Ivanov died in the battle, and sailor Ivan Sergeev died the next day, all from their wounds. Nevertheless, the position of the Indigenous peoples was doomed. On October 2 both sides started negotiations, however, already on October 7, the main forces of the Indigenous peoples fled through the mountains. As a result of the conflict, a fortress Novo-Arkhangelsk was founded, and Russian authority in the region was extended to the Alexander Archipelago.

==== Wintering in Kodiak ====
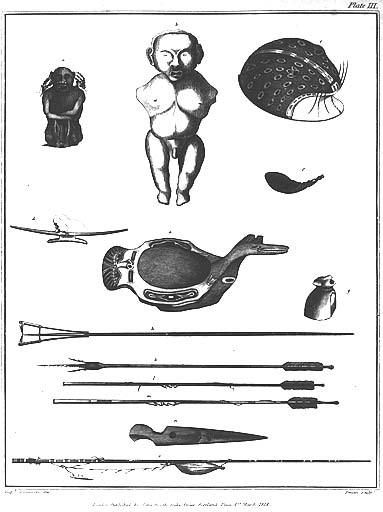
Cult objects and weapons of the Kodiak aborigines. Engraving from the English edition of the Lisyansky's report.

The winter was approaching, and on November 10, 1804, Neva returned to Kodiak to the harbour of St. Paul. By the 16th, the sloop was outfitted, and the crew was transferred ashore. With the advent of cold weather, Lisyansky detected the temperature in 5,5 °F (−14,7 °С). Wintering lasted for 11 months during which the crew lived in comfortable accommodations. Moreover, sailors engaged in fishing and winter haunting. On Svyatki the crew staged a theatrical performance, and for Maslenitsa they built an ice slide. The frost lasted until March 9, 1805; the lowest measured temperature was −17.5 °C (9 pm on January 22). Preparations for the departure started on March 20. From March 22, Lisyansky, with navigator Kalinin and one sailor went on three canoes to conduct geographic surveys. By April 12 they had compiled a map of the Kodiak archipelago, the Chiniat Gulf, the Pavlovsk harbour, and Three Hierarchs Bay.

The RAC's counterman Nikolay Korobitsyn made the main decisions regarding this stage of the expedition. He was also supposed to take furs on board for trading in China. Overall, Neva delivered goods for 310,000 rubles from St. Petersburg, and received furs and walrus bones total cost of 440,000 rubles. Besides loading the goods, the crew had to make a new bowsprit for the sloop that delayed the departure until June 13. The expedition left the Pavlovsk Harbor only at 2 pm on November 16. On June 22, Neva arrived in Novo-Arkhangelsk. During the winter, eight large wooden buildings were constructed, about which Lisyansky wrote that in size and decoration they would have looked quite worthy even in Europe. Neva greeted ruler Baranov with a salute of 9 shots. He was also invited for dinner with the captain. From July 2 to 7, navigator Kalinin was on the Kruzof Island where he described the bay and the Mount Edgecumbe. Lisyansky was so interested in Edgecumbe that on July 21-22 he, together with Povalishin climbed and explored a crater that was overgrown with dense forest. While later describing the journey, the captain greatly exaggerated the height of the mountain.

==== Transition to China ====
After a farewell to Baranov, around 6 pm on September 1, 1805, Neva went to the open sea. To replenish people who left the ship, Lisyansky took aboard two Kodiak aboriginal kayakers and four Russian-Indian mestizo to teach them sailing. Already on September 2, the vessels got into a massive storm that later transformed into a full calm.

One of the aims that Lisyansky had was finding the unknown lands located to the East of Japan. Ship rangers were unsuccessfully looking for land on the horizon, while at 10 pm on October 15, being at 26°43' North latitude and 173°23' West longitude, Neva stranded on corals. By throwing spare yards and rods, and guns, overboard, the crew was able to pull the sloop into deeper water. However, in the morning, a massive storm put the ship back to corals. Even though the keel got damaged, and there was a high risk of destroying the whole ship, the crew successfully dealt with this problem. They even collected all the yards, rods and guns that were previously thrown into the sea. This is how they discovered an uninhabited island that was later named after Lisyansky. Despite the intense heat, the captain went ashore and buried a bottle, with a letter about his priority to the land, into coral sand. However, the damage to the sloop was so significant that Lisyansky later regretted that he was not able to look for unknown areas any further.

By October 31 the crew had only 30-days supply of dried bread left. Thus, the ratio was reduced to a quarter pound per person. Only on November 16, the crew was able to see the Tinian's extremity, and then, all the Northern Mariana Islands. On November 22, the vessel barely got through a heavy squall, that crushed the yal, that was lying on the sheep feed, into wood chips. At the same time, the main-staysail-sheet hit three sailors and threw them overboard. However, a shaft of water brought them back, and they were able to cling to the guys. The water level in the hold exceeded afoot, so the crew had to pump it out urgently. That exhausted people who were sleep and food-deprived for the whole day. On November 23, while cleaning the ship, the crew discovered the stench from the main hold. The next day they opened it and first put vitriole checkers in there, and sprinkled it with vitriol. Then the crew picked up the soaked bales with furs, while braziers heated the damp hold. Lisyansky was afraid of miasms and transferred the crew to the officers' mess before the hold will be in order again. Korobitsyn dismantled the bellows and assessed the damage from November 24 to 28. As a result, spoiled furs in the total cost of 80,000 rubles were thrown into the sea. After the incident, Korobitsyn conducted the report.

=== From Canton to Kronstadt (November 1805 – August 1806) ===
==== The stay in China ====
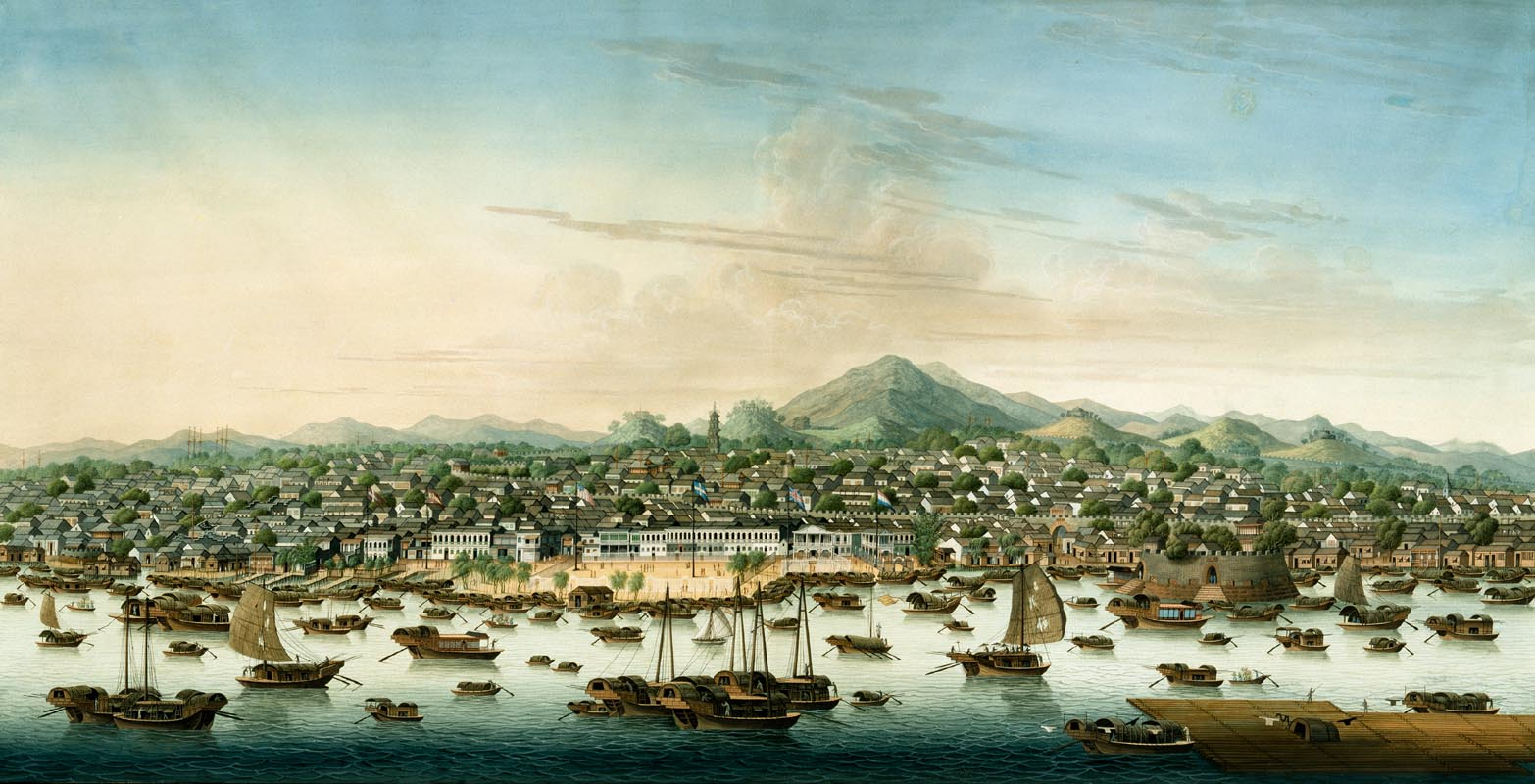
View of Canton, around 1800

Due to mists and snow, on October 9, Nadezhda almost ran aground while leaving the Avacha Bay. The constant swell, cold and storms complicated the further way. Yet, Krusenstern risked searching for islands that were present on old Dutch and Spanish maps, such as Rico de la Plata, Guadeloupe, Malabrigos, and others. All of these islands were later declared nonexistent. The weather had become more or less clear only on the 20th day in the sea. However, on November 17, when the sloop was passing the Taiwan Strait, there was a hard stormy night. The captain ordered to keep the sails safe by all means; however, the old ones were tearing apart with every strong gust of wind. Thus, the new sails had to be installed. During the transition to Macau, the vessel anchored around 7 pm on November 20 when it was already very dark. As a result, the British almost captured the ship as they mistook it for Spanish. The reason for that was that Nadezhda went under the new nine-line commercial flag.

Krusenstern wanted to work with the director of the British East India Company's trading post in Guangzhou, J. Drummond, whom he had known since 1798. Following the instructions of count Rumyantsev, the captain aimed to receive from him detailed information on the Qing dynasty. By that time, the trade season had already opened, and British personnel went to Guangzhou, while the personal house of the director and the premises of the company were provided to Krusenstern and officers who wanted to scatter ashore. It turned out right away that the presence of Nadezhda in the bay broke many rules regarding the stay of foreign ships in China. Krusenstern was also concerned with the fact that the Neva had not shown up yet. On December 3, Lisyansky eventually arrived, and the Russian sloops relocated to the island Huangpu island to the mouth of the Pearl river. Krusenstern, according to the instructions, hoped that the Yury Golovkin 's embassy was already in Beijing, and all agreements with the Qing authorities would be implemented. In reality, the embassy had not even crossed the Chinese border, and Russian sloops caused a commotion among the Guangdong authorities and merchants. Nevertheless, manager of maritime customs, Yan Feng allowed him to enter the port of Canton, apparently intending to charge duty. On the contrary, Governor Wu Xionguan hesitated with granting the permission, and without it, merchants could not make deals. At the same time, the typhoon season had started, and Krusenstern and Lisyansky risked to lose another year. In this situation, the British helped, especially the firm Bil' and Moniak (in Krusenstern's transcription). Officers lived in the house of Petr Dobel. However, the RAC's clerk Shemelin was angry at the requested amount of commission – 5%, instead of the generally accepted 2%. Merchant barely was able to persuade the youngest member of the community Gunhan Li Yanyu to "thank" Yan Feng. When the case moved forward, Shemelin did not want to engage in barter exchanges, but demanded cash in silver (possibly fulfilling the requirements of his company).

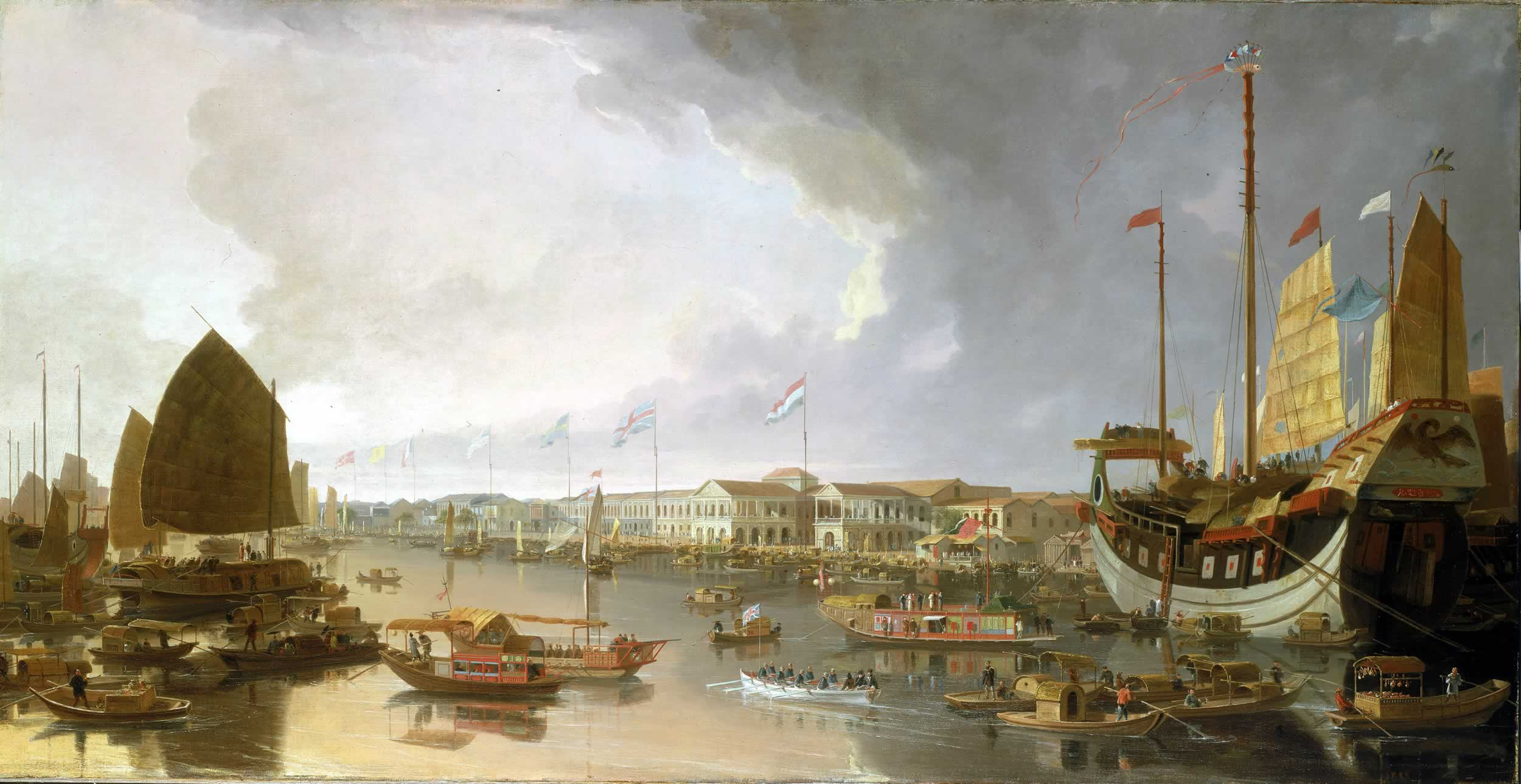
View on the thirteen factories in Canton by William Daniell, 1805–1810

Generally, the deal did not bring the expected profit. According to Korobitsyn, they managed to sell furs in the amount of 191,621.5 Spanish piastres, for which tea was obtained for 80,000, silk fabrics for 20,000, porcelain for 14,000 and pearls for 3,000 piastres. In case they received 74,631.5 piastres, however, from them they paid commission to British, taxes, measurement tax, supplies for ministers, as well as expenses of two captains, two clerks and their servants on the shore. Krusenstern settled in the Austrian trading post (costing 800 piastres), and Lisyansky in the Armenian one (600 piastres). Shemelin claimed that for the cargo they received only 176,605 piastres. The situation was extremely unfavourable, and it was decided to bring the best fur of sea otters, foxes, arctic foxes and bears back to St. Petersburg. For the most valuable beaver skins, Chinese side gave no more than 20 piastres (100 rubles), although in Moscow they could be sold for 200-300 rubles. Probably, Krusenstern did not get into much details regarding the deal, considering it only as an annoying hindrance to his main cause. Generally, the common cargo consisted of 832 boxes of different tea sorts and 20 000 pieces of silk fabric on Nadezhda, as well as 1201 boxes of tea and thousands of unsold livestock from Alaska on Neva. Lisyansky used the delays in the departure to careene the Neva, and to repair the underwater skin and keel. All the repair works were carried out between December 27 and 29, 1805. A conflict between Krusenstern and Lisyansky erupted in January. As far as one can judge, Lisyansky sought to participate in the transaction and receive a captain's commission, referring to his status and the Maritime Charter.

The stay of the Russian sloops in Canton almost led to a political crisis. On January 22, 1806, the governor had ordered to stop the loading of Chinese goods until he received an official response from Beijing on the arrival of the Russian ships. He even set up the guards around the sloops. Director Drummond entered the position of both Kruzenshtern and Lisyansky and contacted the goppo through Lee Yanyu. As a result, the guard was removed. He even wrote a short letter to the governor with a request to release the sloops from China. Despite all the difficulties, the decisiveness of the British and Russian side took effect: the goppo personally visited Nadezhda and met with Lisyansky (Krusenstern was absent) – a rare case in relations between Chinese officials and foreign merchants. It seems that the governor and the customs authorities sought to get rid of the Russians as quickly as possible, so the exit documents were completed in just two days. On February 9, both sloops left Guangzhou. Already after the departure of Nadezhda and Neva Jiaqing Emperor annulled all the deals, and ordered to detent the ships. The emperor's order stated that marine trade with Russia would only damage the border trade in Kyakhta. Drummond tried to resend the copy of this order to the Russian authorities; he also sent view on the situation to Nikolay Novosiltsev.

At that time, the political situation between France and Russia was uncertain – many expected the war to start. For this reason, after leaving Huangpu, Krusenstern ordered to keep the vessels together and not to apart. In case if bad weather parted the sloops, both vessels would meet at the Saint Helena island which played the role of a rendezvous point. However, ships should not wait longer than four days.

==== Return of the Neva ====
Joint travelling of Nadezhda and Neva lasted until April 15, 1806. While leaving the Sunda Strait on March 5, sailor Stepan Konoplev died from a gastric disease, and was buried following the maritime tradition. On April 15, according to both Lisyansky and Korobitsyn, due to a "gloomy weather", the vessels parted. After that the commander of the Neva went under all sails to the Cape of Good Hope, wishing at all costs to return first. The vessel passed the Southern part of Africa at 3 pm on April 20, and on 24th it entered the zone of favorable southeast trade winds. Important events happened later this day. After counting food supplies, Lisyansky decided not to wait for Krusenstern at the Saint Helena, but to return to Saint Petersburg by his own as the provision should be enough for the three months travel. To successfully return, Lisyansky sacrificed part of his estate privileges. For instance, officers on the Neva ate fresh meat, while the lower ranks ate salted beef. Thus, only 20 chickens were left for the messes, and the crew was assigned with a new ration. Since there were no fresh herbs left, tea leaves were added to a corned beef soup. On Sundays and Thursdays the crew relied on rice porridge with molasses. On Mondays and Wednesdays – pickles or pickled vegetables. On Tuesdays and Fridays rice porridge was cooked on a "dried broth". The norm of the water consumption was 112 buckets (approximately 12 litres) per week. At the same time, there was an English beer essence that provided a "healthy and pleasant drink".

On April 26, a large conflict in the mess took place. Senior assistant lieutenant P.V. Povalishin sharply objected against the plans of the commander, which is recorded in the journal of the navigator Kalinin. He said it literally: "What, do you want to kill us by hunger?" and on that he received an answer "If I hear one more rude word, I will order to send you back to cabin". Nevertheless, in order to be able to collect rainwater and, if needed, get help from the shore, the route back to St. Petersburg was laid along the meridian of the Cape Verde Islands, and then the Azores. On June 9, near with the Corvo Island the vessel met the English military ship that delivered the news about the beginning of War of the Fourth Coalition between France and Russia. Even though Neva obtained all the necessary security certificates from the French government, the crew made all the arrangements to prepare for a potential fight. Finally, on June 26, the vessel reached the English Channel, and the met pilot bot led the sloop to Portsmouth for 50 Guineas. This record transition lasted 140 days, and was unprecedented for its time; there were no scurvy patients on board. The stay in Portsmouth lasted two weeks (June 28 – July 13), and Lisyansky even visited London from there. From the Downs to Skagen Neva went with the squadron of Lord Keith; the Russian ambassador obtained permission. On July 21, sailor Ivan Gorbunov died – he was previously injured in the chest during the Russo-Swedish War (1788–1790). At the last day of sailing on August 5, with fair wind the Neva showed a record speed in 11 knots which was approximately 20, 37 kilometres per hour, and in the morning of August 6 it anchored in Kronstadt.

Lisyansky was on the road for almost three years (1095 days). Altogether, he passed 45 083 marine miles (83 493 kilometres) for 532 days in the sea. 58.5 % of time and 57.2 % of the covered distance, Lisyansky acted independently. In the evening of August 6, the clerk Korobitsyn reported at the general meeting of shareholders of the Russian-American company. The next morning the directorate arrived on the Neva. On August 7, count Rumyantsev and count Stroganov also visited the vessel. On August 8, the emperor visited the sloop and had breakfast there, appreciating the quality of the sailors' food that was offered to him. On August 10, the sloop was visited by Empress and the four great princes on a boat from Peterhof. On September 5, Alexander I additionally examined the goods that were brought from China and already removed from the holds. On September 9, the auction of Chinese tea took place, where all the goods from both sloops (2095 boxes) were sold to Moscow merchants for 110 rubles per pound. On September 20, clerk Korobitsyn received a gold medal in memory of the expedition on the St. Andrew's ribbon, and eventually said goodbye to the sloop and its team. Captain Lieutenant Lisyansky was promoted to Captain of the second rank, received Order of Saint Vladimir 3rd degree, a life pension, and a bonus of 3,000 rubles in silver. From the RAC he was awarded a prize of 10,000 rubles. The team presented its captain the golden sword "Gratitude of the Neva's crew".

==== Return of the Nadezhda ====
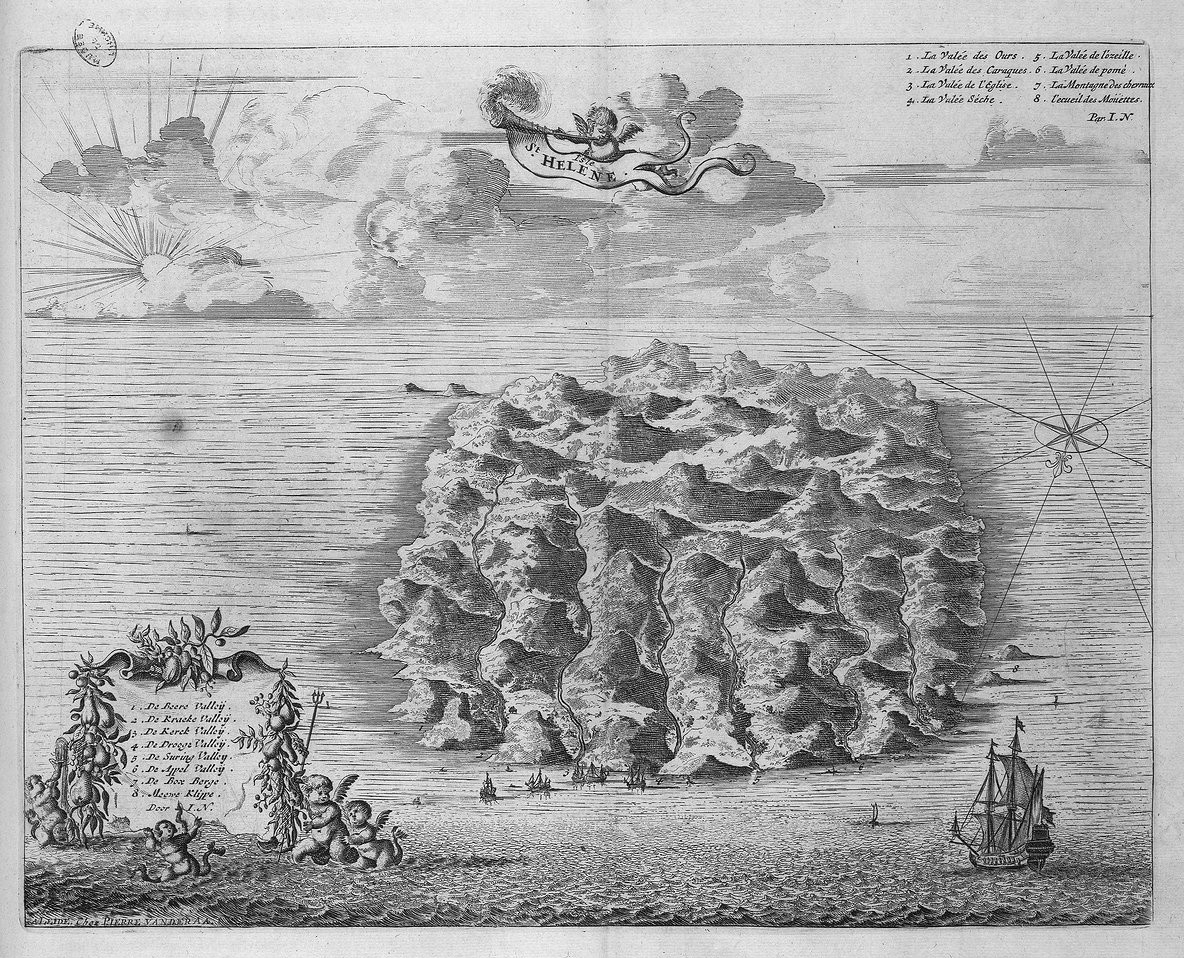
Panorama of the Saint Helena island, 1727

Transition through the South China Sea in the typhoon season was quite dangerous. On March 1, the island Krakatoa got visible, and the crew discovered a safe passage nearby. Leaving the Sunda Strait, the sloop Nadezhda was able to cope with the current that carried it to the reefs only because of a rising wind. The sloop reached the Indian Ocean on March 3. During the massive storm on March 11, the topmast on the Neva was damaged, while a jibboom got cracked on the Nadezhda. On April 2, when sloops passed the meridian of St. Petersburg, lieutenant Petr Golovachev tried to commit suicide, but missed the shot. Doctor Espenberg was the first one who reacted to the sound of a shot and on the smell of gunpowder. On April 15 Nadezhda parted with Neva, and, besides, Krusenstern realized that it was a conscious decision of Lisyansky to take another course. In four days Krusenstern rounded the Cape of Good Hope, and on May 3 he arrived in the Saint Helena island, transitioning from Macau in 79 days.

Lieutenant Levenstern was the first who went ashore, bringing with him the news about the war between Russia and France. In the morning on May 4, Ratmanov and Krusenstern were going to visit the shore, and Golovachev was on duty and "as usual and with a cheerful look" reported to them. Later that day, Tilesius also left the sloop and said to the commander and the first assistant that 29-year-old Golovachev committed suicide. According to the diaries of Levenstern, he shot himself in the face. According to Ratmanov and Levenstern, while being on the Marquesas Islands, Golovachev took the Rezanov's side and was counting on a career in the RAC. However, as a result, he quarrelled with the officers who saw in him the ambassador's henchman. Probably, he thought about a suicide while being in China, because he made presents with his monogram for many officers. Before his last act, he left accusatory letters to Krusenstern, Tilesius and Romberg, and enclosed a letter to the emperor in a packet with a message to Krusenstern. Levenstern described in his diary the content of the letters to his colleagues. After Nadezhda returned to St. Petersburg, Alexander I ordered to burn the Golovachev's letter without opening, and not to conduct any investigations. Governor of the island Robert Patton said to Krusenstern that person who experienced melancholia could not be considered as suicidal. Thus, the Anglican priest buried Golovachev with military honours, leaving the Latin epitaph composed by Espenberg on the tombstone.

It was impossible to get any proviant on Saint Helena because all flour products almost entirely went to the English squadron, and all the other products were costly. For instance, three guineas were asked for a ram, a bag of potatoes in two and a half pounds cost one guinea, chicken or duck – half of a guinea, 20 eggs – piastre, etc. As a result, upon to arrival in Copenhagen, the crew had to use only their stocks. After finding out about the war with France, Krusenstern regretted Lisyansky's self-will; besides, some of the guns were left in Kamchatka, and the English garrison could not offer a replacement for Russian ammunition. Thus, having only 12 guns on board, Krusenstern decided to round Scotland in the North Sea through the Orkney islands. At noon on May 8, the sloop Nadezhda left Jamestown. For the fourth and last time, the vessel crossed the Equator on May 21 in the Saint Nicholas day, being at 22° West longitude. On July 17, the ship passed between the islands of Fair Isle and Mainland of the Shetland islands, and on July 21 got closer to the Norwegian shores. On the island of Fair the crew managed to buy fresh fish, eggs and lamb. On July 23, the ship came across the English frigate Quebec, where for the first time Krusenstern received information about Lisyansky, who had left Portsmouth a week before and was being escorted by an English squadron. Nadezhda arrived in Copenhagen at 10 am on August 2. Sailing from China lasted five months 24 days, minus the 4-day stay at the Saint Helena island when only a small part of the crew went ashore. The captain reported the absence of scurvy patients on board. The ship anchored in Kronstadt on August 19, being absent for 3 years and 12 days.

On August 21-22 admiral Pavel Chichagov and count Rumyantsev visited the ship. On August 27, Krusenstern was invited to the Kamenny Island Palace. During the audience, the empress mother Maria Feodorovna granted the captain a diamond snuffbox as a sign of the highest favour. On August 30, Alexander I visited the Nadezhda and was on the board until 3 pm. All officers were granted with ranks and pensions. Krusenstern was also awarded Saint Vladimir order 3rd rank and was elected an honorary member of the Academy of Sciences. Horner and Tilesius received pension in 1000 rubles that was paid to them in Dutch chervonets. Sailors of both the Neva and Nadezhda received a retirement with a pension of 50 rubles per year.

== Results and commemoration ==
=== Geographic discoveries ===
Crews on Nadezhda and Neva made several discoveries in the Pacific, including the last remaining undiscovered areas in the North. Lisyansky, along with Neva's navigator Dmitry Kalinin, mapped the Kodiak Island in the Gulf of Alaska and parts of the Alexander Archipelago. West of Sitka Island, Kalinin identified the Kruzof Island, previously thought to be an archipelago. Lisyansky named a large island to the North of Sitka Island Chichagof Island.

While in transit from Kodiak to Macau, the expedition discovered the uninhabited Lisianski Island and Neva Reef, part of the Hawaiian islands. To the southwest of these, the expedition also identified the previously unknown Krusenstern reef.

On the way from Japan to Kamchatka, Krusenstern navigated through the Tsushima Strait to the Sea of Japan and mapped the western coast of Hokkaido. Many of the names given during the expedition remain on contemporary maps, for instance, the capes of Senyavin and Soymonov.

While crossing the Greater Kuril Chain, Krusenstern discovered four "Lovushki" islands. Passing through the Nadezhda Strait, the Krusenstern's crew reached the Cape Patience, where it began charting the way to Cape Levenstern, covering a distance of approximately 900 kilometers. They also discovered the Northern Strait, naming its entrance and exit capes "Elizabeth" and "Maria" respectively. Near the northern entrance to the Amur Liman, Krusenstern noted shallow waters and incorrectly concluded that Sakhalin was a peninsula.

Participants of the first Russian circumnavigation conducted various oceanographic observations. They identified the Equatorial Counter Current in the Atlantic and the Pacific Oceans, measured temperature differences at depths of up to 400 meters, and determined its specific gravity, clarity, and color. They also investigated the Milky Seas effect, explaining the phenomena, and collected extensive data on atmospheric pressure and tides in several oceanic regions.

=== Publishing the results of the expedition ===
The first edition of Travelling around the world by Krusenstern

Krusenstern's expedition aroused great interest both in Russia and in Europe that lasted for several decades. The ethnographic collection gethered during the expedition was initially displayed in the Museum of the Admiralty Department. After being sorted, the collection was transferred to Kunstkamera. The collection includes goods from the Easter Island, Marquesas, and the Hawaiian archipelagos.

The expedition's works were widely replicated. Between 1809 and 1812, Krusenstern's three-volume Journey Around the World (1310 pages) with an accompanying atlas was published in both Russian and German at public expense. The atlas included 32 landscapes of the islands that the expedition visited, 44 depictions of ethnic groups (such as Polynesians, Japanese, Chinese, Ainu, Kamchadals, Aleuts, and Nivkhs), and maps of the islands and shores. In 1913, Krusenstern's book was translated into English, French, Italian, Dutch, Swedish, and Danish.

Lisyansky's account of the circumnavigation, including illustrations and maps, was published independently in 1812 at the cost of 18 500 rubles. The book gained particular popularity in the West, and in 1814, was published in London in Lisyansky's own translation, which differed significantly from the Russian version. Langsdorf's descriptions of the journey were published in 1812–1814 in both German and English but were never translated into Russian.

Several other works followed. Korobitsyn's notes were not fully published until 1944, 50 years after that of Hieromonk Gideon, and provided information on the ethnography of Alaska. The official reports by Rezanov and Shemelin, detailing the negotiations in Japan, were published In 1816-1818 and 1822–1825. In 1820, S. Pryor published a comprehensive description of the circumnavigation, in which Krusenstern's expedition was placed on par with Magellan's.

Until the mid 20th century, Krusenstern's Journey Around the World had not been translated into Russian. The 1950s edition was abridged, preserving notes from only the third (scientific) volume, including notes of Kamchadal and Marquesan music (performed by Tilesius) and a letter from Commerce Minister Count Rumyantsev. In 2007, marking the 200th anniversary of the expedition completion, this abriged version was re-released. Lisyansky's second edition was published in 1947 by the Geografgiz publishing house. This version was also abridged – omitting all the detailed descriptions of astronomical and navigational characteristics, as well as price lists for products and goods. In 1977 this edition was re-published in Vladivostok by the Far Eastern Book Publishing House. The Geografgiz edition later formed the basis of the 2007 third edition, released for the expedition's bicentennial. The richly illustrated volumes of the travels of Krusenstern and Lisyansky were also published in the series The Great Travels by the publishing house Eksmo.

Despite the abundance of published materials, by the end of the 20th century, several unpublished diaries, journals and illustrations remained archived. These included the journal conducted by the Neva's navigator Dmitry Kalinin, notes by Tilesius, and a manuscript by quartermaster Shemelin. In 2003 the previously unpublished diary of Levenstern was released in both Russian and English, with the Russian translation by Tamara Shafranovskaya.

In 2005 the album Around the world with Krusenstern, edited by O. Fedorova and A. Krusenstern was published. This work was the based on the Atlas featuring Tilesius drawings and was supplemented with botanic illustrations by Langsdorf, as well as previously unpublished pictures from the archives of Tilesius and Levenstern. The album included a comprehensive foreword, appendixes, and a full chronicle of the events compiled in a systematic selection of diaries kept by expedition participants.

In 2015, the same team of authors published all the Ratmanov's journals with extensive commentaries. For the first time, watercolour paintings by astronomer Horner and naturalist Langsdorf were also published.

=== Commemoration ===
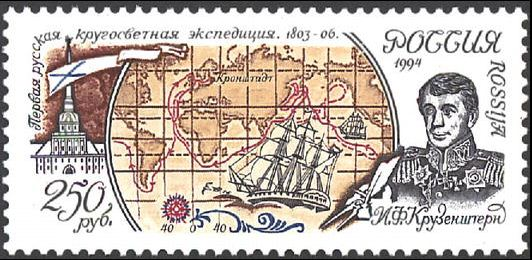
Postmark, 1994

Historian Elena Govor notes that Soviet and contemporary Russian historiography often interpret Russian expeditions, including those of Lisyansky and Krusenstern, within the context of Russian Imperial achievements in geography, natural history, and ethnography. Beginning in the 1980s, the circumnavigation became an object for historical reflection, namely in the four-volume monograph by Glen Barath, published in 1988–1992. Govor highlights that published and commented sources provided a significant foundation for further research. Honorary polar explorer L. M. Sverdlov dedicated several publications to the relationship between Rezanov and Krusenstern. After discovering new documents within the Archive of the Foreign Policy of the Russian Empire, which detailed the conflict between the captain and chamberlain, Sverdlov published two monographs in 2006 and 2016.

Krusenstern and Lisyansky's expedition has been a subject of artistic reflection in children's literature. In 1930, Nikolai Chukovskii published the novel Ivan Krusenstern and Yuri Lisyansky – first Russian captains that rounded the world, which was later included in the 1941 anthology Frigate Drivers. Events and characters of the first Russian circumnavigation are central to the adventure novel Islands and captains by Vladislav Krapivin (1984–1987). Additionally, the cartoon Winter in Prostokvashino popularised the aphorism, "Ivan Fedorovich Krusenstern – a person and a steamboat,".

In 1993, the Central Bank of Russia issued a series of commemorative coins honoring the first Russian circumnavigation. Further, Russia, Estonia, Ukraine, and Saint Helena Island released postmarks dedicated to Krusenstern and the circumnavigation. In December 2013, the 4-episode documentary series Neva and Nadezhda: The first Russian circumnavigation, directed by Russian journalist Mikhail Kozhukhov, released on the state channel Russia-1.

A series of commemorative coins from the Bank of Russia (1993)

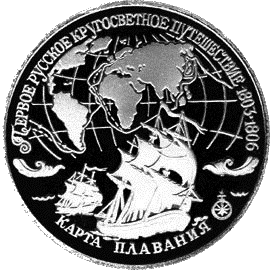
A map of the journey

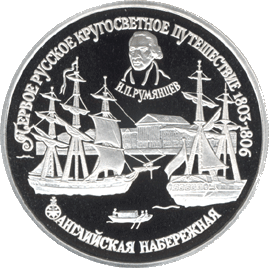
Nikolay Rumyantsev, the sponsor, and the English Embankment in Saint Petersburg, the starting point

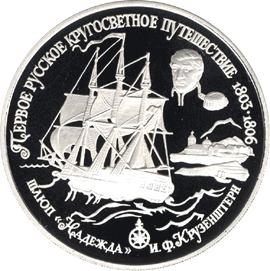
Nadezhda and Ivan Kruzenshtern

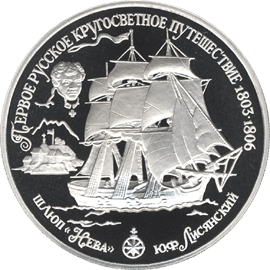
Neva and Yuri Lisyansky

== Notable crew ==
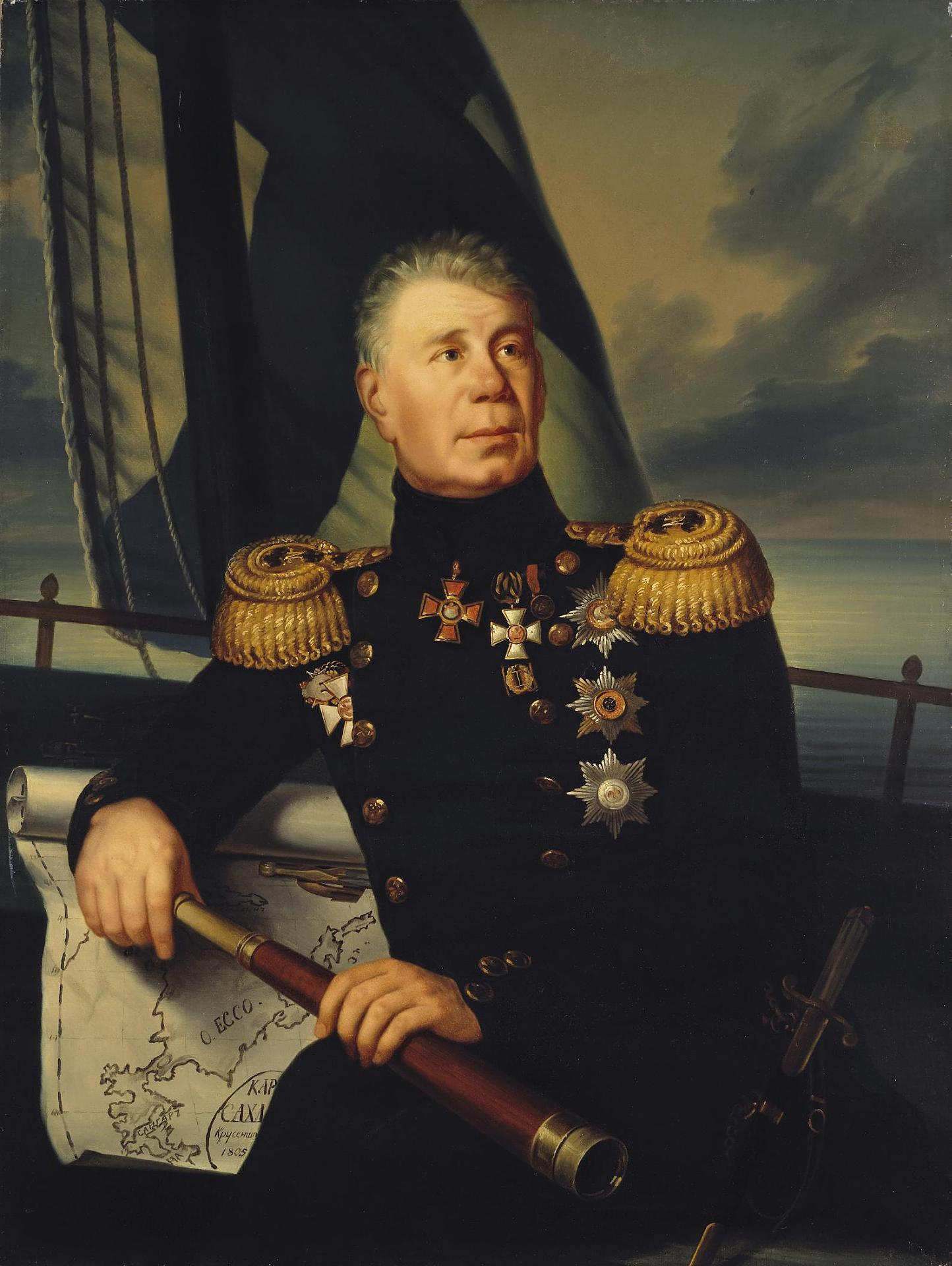
Adam Johann von Krusenstern

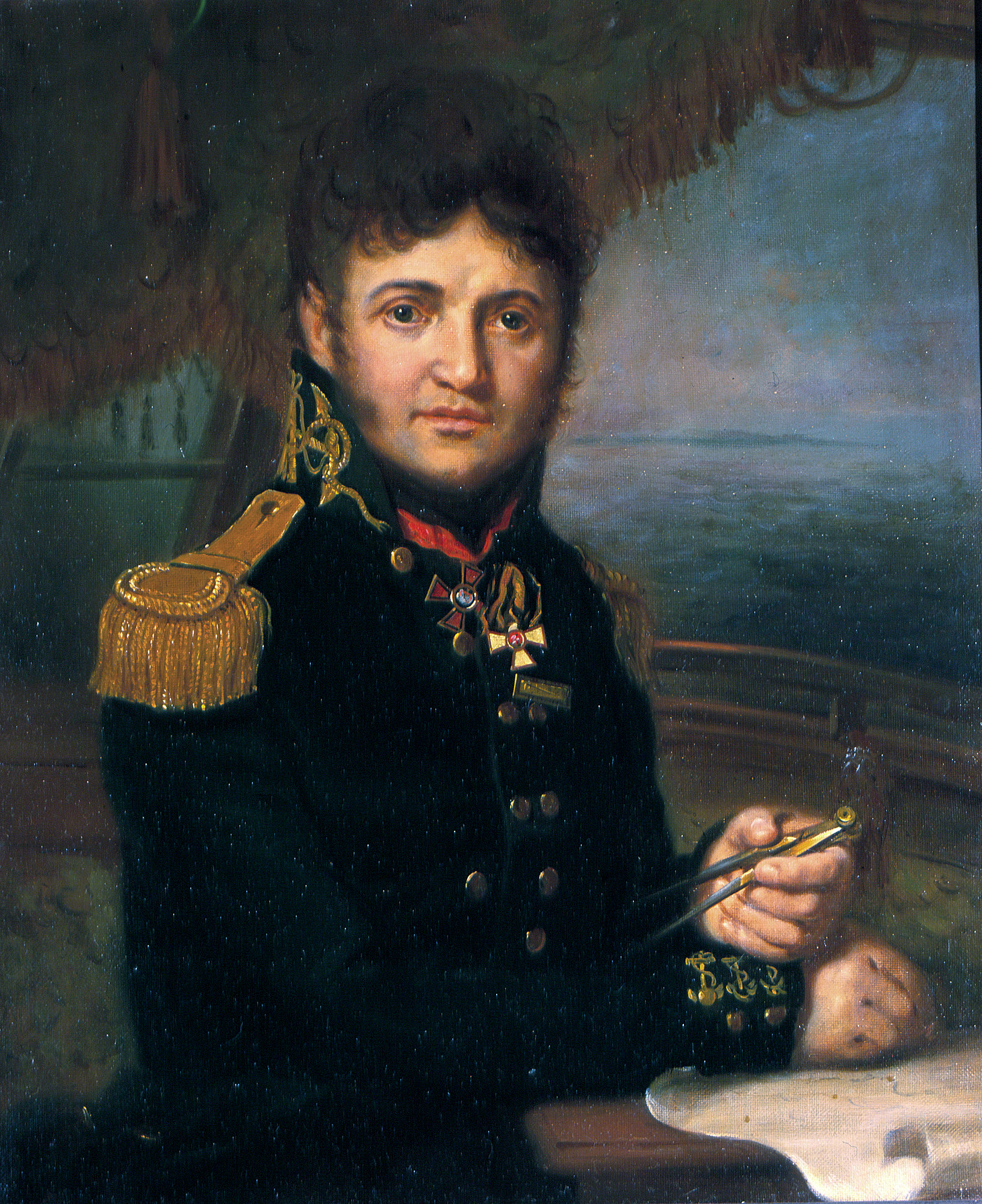
Yuri Lisyansky

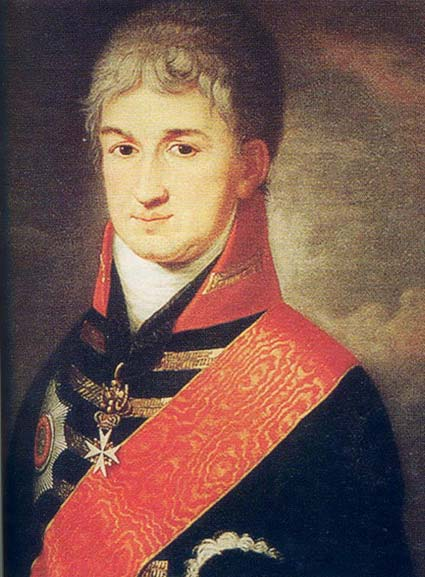
Nikolai Rezanov

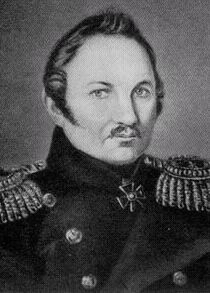
Fabian Gottlieb von Bellingshausen

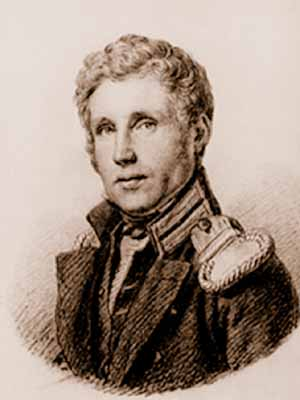
Otto von Kotzebue

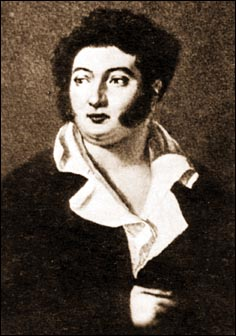
Fyodor Ivanovich Tolstoy

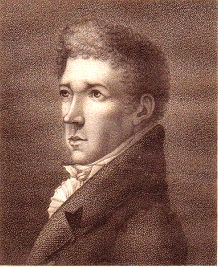
Grigory Langsdorff

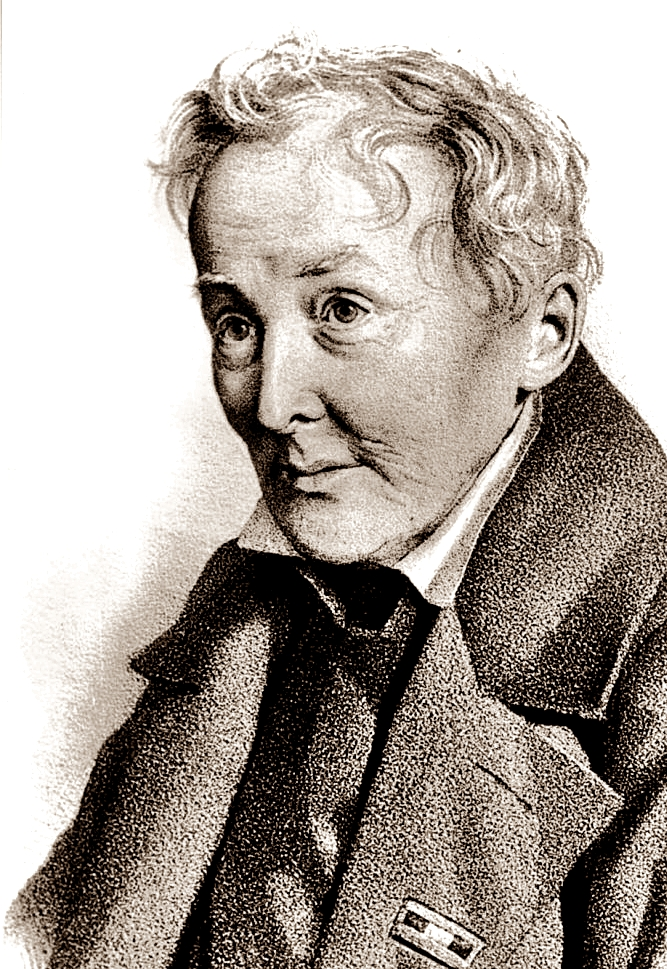
Wilhelm Gottlieb Tilesius von Tilenau
- Adam Johann von Krusenstern, leader of the expedition and Captain of Nadezhda. Later Russian Admiral.
- Yuri Lisyansky, Captain of Neva. Instrumental to the Russian victory in the Battle of Sitka against Tlingit during the journey.
- Nikolai Rezanov, appointed ambassador to Japan, co-led the expedition with Krusenstern until Kamchatka. One of the founders of the Russian-American Company, and in 1799, was made an inspector of Russian colonies in America after the embassy failed; protagonist of the rock opera Juno and Avos.
- Fabian Gottlieb von Bellingshausen, lieutenant and cartographer. Published a collection of maps of the Pacific following the journey. He is credited with the discovery of the continent of Antarctica and several Pacific islands during his own circumnavigation, later becoming an Admiral.
- Otto von Kotzebue, cabin boy. Later, captained two circumnavigations, discovered over 400 Pacific islands and the Kotzebue Sound on Alaska.
- Count Fyodor Ivanovich Tolstoy, known for his mischievous exploits during the voyage. Later, garnering fame as a celebrity adventurer earning the nickname 'The American'. He also served as the prototype for Zaretsky in Pushkin's Eugene Onegin.
- Grigory Langsdorff, naturalist and physician. Later, becoming one of the most renowned Russian explorers of Brazil and South America.
- Wilhelm Gottlieb Tilesius von Tilenau, ship's doctor, marine biologist and expedition artist. His illustrated report on the expedition appeared in 1814. Also known for the reconstruction of the Adams mammoth skeleton.

== See also ==
- Mulovsky expedition
- List of circumnavigations
- List of Russian explorers
- Second Russian circumnavigation (1966)
