= Marquis of Huntley (ship) =

Several vessels have been named Marquis of Huntley for the Marquess of Huntly:

- Marquis of Huntley (1804 ship) was launched at Aberdeen in 1804 as a West Indiaman. She disappeared from the registers between 1814 and 1824. She then made four voyages transporting convicts to New South Wales. She was a transport for much of her career, carrying cargoes and troops for the British government. She suffered a maritime incident in November 1834. She was last listed in 1843, possibly having been wrecked 24 June 1844.
- Marquis of Huntley (1804 Dutch ship) was built in Holland under another name. She was taken in prize circa 1803 and from 1804 became a slave ship. She made two slave voyages and with the end of the British slave trade she first traded with the Baltic and then made one voyage from Hull as a whaler in the northern whale fishery. She foundered later that year while returning from the Baltic.
- Marquis of Huntly (1811 EIC ship) (or Marquis of Huntley) was launched at Rotherhithe. She made 11 voyages for the British East India Company (EIC) between 1812 and 1834, when she was broken up.
- Marquis of Huntley, of 71 tons (m), was launched in Scotland in 1811. On 26 September 1813, the US privateer Yankee captured the brigs Ann and Marquis of Huntley. On 9 October Yankee captured the schooner Katie. Yankee was on her fourth cruise and Katie and Marquis of Huntley were the only two prizes to reach an American port. Katie yielded $12.59 per share and Marquis of Huntley yielded $4.70 per share, making this a particularly poor cruise for Yankee's investors and crew. Marquis of Huntley's listing in Lloyd's Register carried the annotation "captured".
