= Lisianski =

Lisianski (Lisiansky, Lisyansky) may refer to one of the following.

- Yuri Feodorovich Lisyansky, an officer in the Imperial Russian Navy and explorer
- Things named after Lisyansky:
  - Lisianski Island, Hawaii
  - Lisianski Peninsula, located on the west coast of Baranof Island in the Alaska Panhandle.
  - Lisianski Mountain, Sakhalin
  - Lisianski Strait, at the northern end of Chichagof Island, Alaska
  - Lisianski Bay
  - Cape Lisianski
