= Cirencester (1795 EIC ship) =

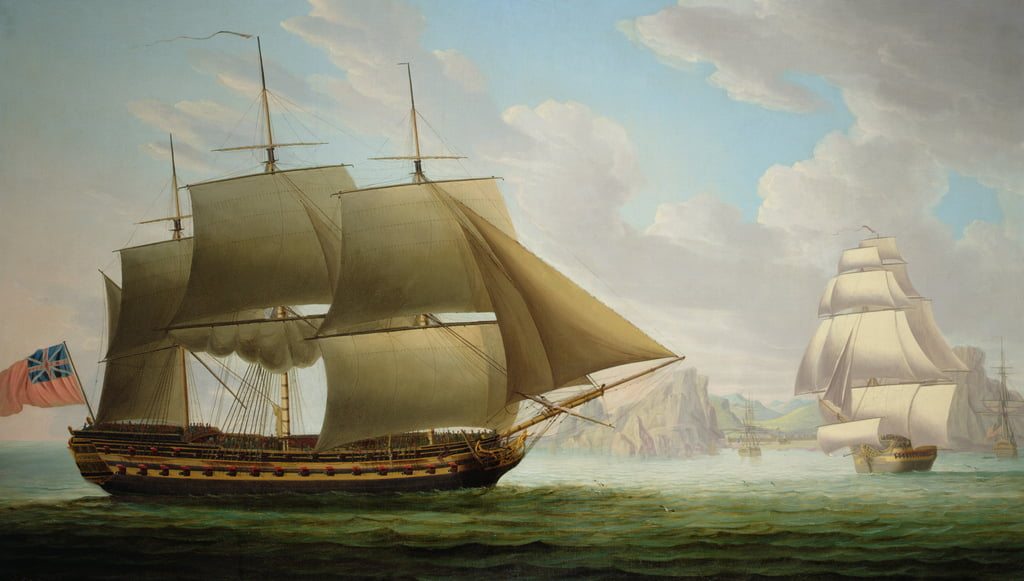
- East Indiaman Cirencester off St Helena 1795, by Robert Dodd (artist)

History

Great Britain
- Name: Cirencester
- Namesake: Cirencester
- Owner: EIC voyages #1-6: Sir Robert Preston; EIC voyages #7-8: Francis P Martin.
- Operator: British East India Company
- Builder: Randall, Rotherhithe
- Launched: 6 April 1795
- Fate: Hulked 1813

General characteristics
- Tons burthen: 1439, 143912/94, or 1504 (bm)
- Length: Overall:176 ft 8 in (53.8 m); Keel:144 ft 1 in (43.9 m)
- Beam: 43 ft 4 in (13.2 m)
- Depth of hold: 17 ft 6 in (5.3 m)
- Complement: 1795: 150; 1797: 135; 1803: 145; 1806: 150
- Armament: 1795: 46 × 12&9-pounder guns; 1797: 30 × 12-pounder guns; 1803: 40 × 12&18-pounder guns; 1806: 38 × 12&18-pounder guns

Cirencester was launched in 1795 at Rotherhithe. Between 1795 and 1813 she made eight voyages as an East Indiaman for the British East India Company (EIC). She was sold in 1813 for a hulk.

== Career ==
1st EIC voyage (1795–1796): Captain Martin Lindsay acquired a letter of marque on 22 March 1795. When Captain Lindsay found himself unable to procure any lime-juice prior to Cirencester's departure, he converted a part of his own apartments into a garden that he managed with considerable success. Consequently, her surgeon, John Livingston, reported that this saved the lives of many crew members. Captain Lindsay sailed from Portsmouth on 9 July, bound for China. Cirencester arrived at Whampoa Anchorage on 28 December. Homeward bound, she crossed the Second Bar, reached St Helena on 30 July and Crookhaven on 26 November; she arrived at Long Reach on 16 December.

2nd EIC voyage (1797–1798): Captain Thomas Robertson acquired a letter of marque on 28 March 1797. On 5 June he sailed from Portsmouth, bound for China. Cirencester arrived at Whampoa on 17 December. Homeward bound, she crossed the Second Bar on 14 February 1798, reached St Helena on 5 August, and arrived at Long Reach on 23 October.

3rd EIC voyage (1800–1801): Captain Robertson sailed from Portsmouth on 7 January 1800, bound for Bombay and China. Cirencester reached Joanna on 3 May and arrived at Bombay on 26 May. She then sailed on, reaching Malacca on 21 September and arrived at Whampoa on 5 November. Homeward bound, she crossed the Second Bar on 29 December, reached St Helena on 15 April 1801, and arrived Long Reach on 17 June.

4th EIC voyage (1802–1803): Captain Robertson sailed from Portsmouth on 25 February 1802, bound for Madras and China. Cirencester reached Madras on 15 June, Penang on 1 August, and Malacca on 25 August; she arrived at Whampoa on 17 September. Homeward bound, she crossed the Second Bar on 22 November, reached St Helena on 23 February 1803, and arrived at Long Reach on 26 April.

5th EIC voyage (1804–1805): Captain Thomas Robertson acquired a letter of marque on 22 December 1803. He sailed from Portsmouth on 13 February 1804, bound for Bombay, Madras, and China. Cirencester reached Bombay on 26 May, Madras on 19 August, and Malacca on 13 September; she arrived at Whampoa on 18 October. Homeward bound, she crossed the Second Bar on 16 December and reached Penang on 21 January 1805. At Penang she took on board as a passenger Captain Peter Heywood of the Royal Navy, who had surrendered his command of HMS Dedaigneuse for reasons of ill-health and family issues. Cirencester reached St Helena on 2 April and arrived at Northfleet on 15 September.

6th EIC voyage (1806–1808): Captain Henry Halkett acquired a letter of marque on 27 February 1806. He sailed from Portsmouth on 14 May 1806, bound for China. Cirencester reached the Cape on 7 August and Penang on 21 October, and arrived at Whampoa on 18 January 1807. Homeward bound, she crossed the Second Bar on 23 February, reached Penang on 30 June, the Cape on 19 September, St Helena on 13 October, and Crookhaven on 17 December. She arrived at Long Reach on 12 January 1808.

7th EIC voyage (1810–1811): Captain Halkett sailed from Portsmouth on 13 April 1810, bound for St Helena, Penang, and China. Cirencester reached St Helena on 9 July, Penang on 1 October, and Malacca on 28 October. She arrived at Whampoa on 25 January 1811. Homeward bound, she crossed the Second Bar on 23 February, reached St Helena on 11 July, and arrived at Long Reach on 30 September.

8th EIC voyage (1812–1813): Captain Halkett sailed from Portsmouth on 23 March 1812, bound for China. Cirencester was at Madeira on 20 April, reached Batavia on 11 August, and arrived at Whampoa on 22 September. Cirencester and Marquis of Huntly were reported to have been dismasted on their way to China. However, it was not Marquis of Huntly that lost her masts but the frigate HMS Theban. Homeward bound, Cirencester crossed the Second Bar on 16 December, reached St Helena on 28 March 1813, and arrived at Long Reach on 7 June.

== Fate ==
Cirencester was sold in 1813 for use as a hulk.
