= Kruzof Island =

Island in southeastern Alaska

Coordinates: 57°10′14″N 135°40′29″W

Native name: Tlikh
- Interactive map of Kruzof Island

Geography
- Archipelago: Alexander Archipelago
- Area: 167.47 sq mi (433.7 km^{2})
- Length: 24 mi (39 km)
- Width: 9 mi (14 km)
- Highest elevation: 3,201 ft (975.7 m)
- Highest point: Mount Edgecumbe

Administration
- United States
- State: Alaska

Kruzof Island (Russian: остров Крузов) is an island in the Alexander Archipelago in southeastern Alaska. It is about 16 km (10 mi) west of Sitka, and is part of the City and Borough of Sitka. It was named in 1805 by Captain U. T. Lisianski as Crooze Island, after a Russian Admiral. It hosts the region's only volcano, Mount Edgecumbe.

In 1849, Captain Tebenkov recorded the Tlingit name for the island as being Tlikh.

== Naming history ==
Before being named by Lisianski, it was called San Jacinto after its highest point, Mount Edgecumbe, was named Montaña de San Jacinto by Don Juan de la Bodega y Quadra in 1775. La Pérouse referred to that name by calling the island St. Hyacinthe. Captain Nathaniel Portlock named the island Pitt Island in 1787. Early Russian traders called it Sitka Island. In 1849, Constantin Grewingk called the island Edgecumbe. It later became known as Kruzow Island before finally becoming Kruzof Island.

== Geography ==
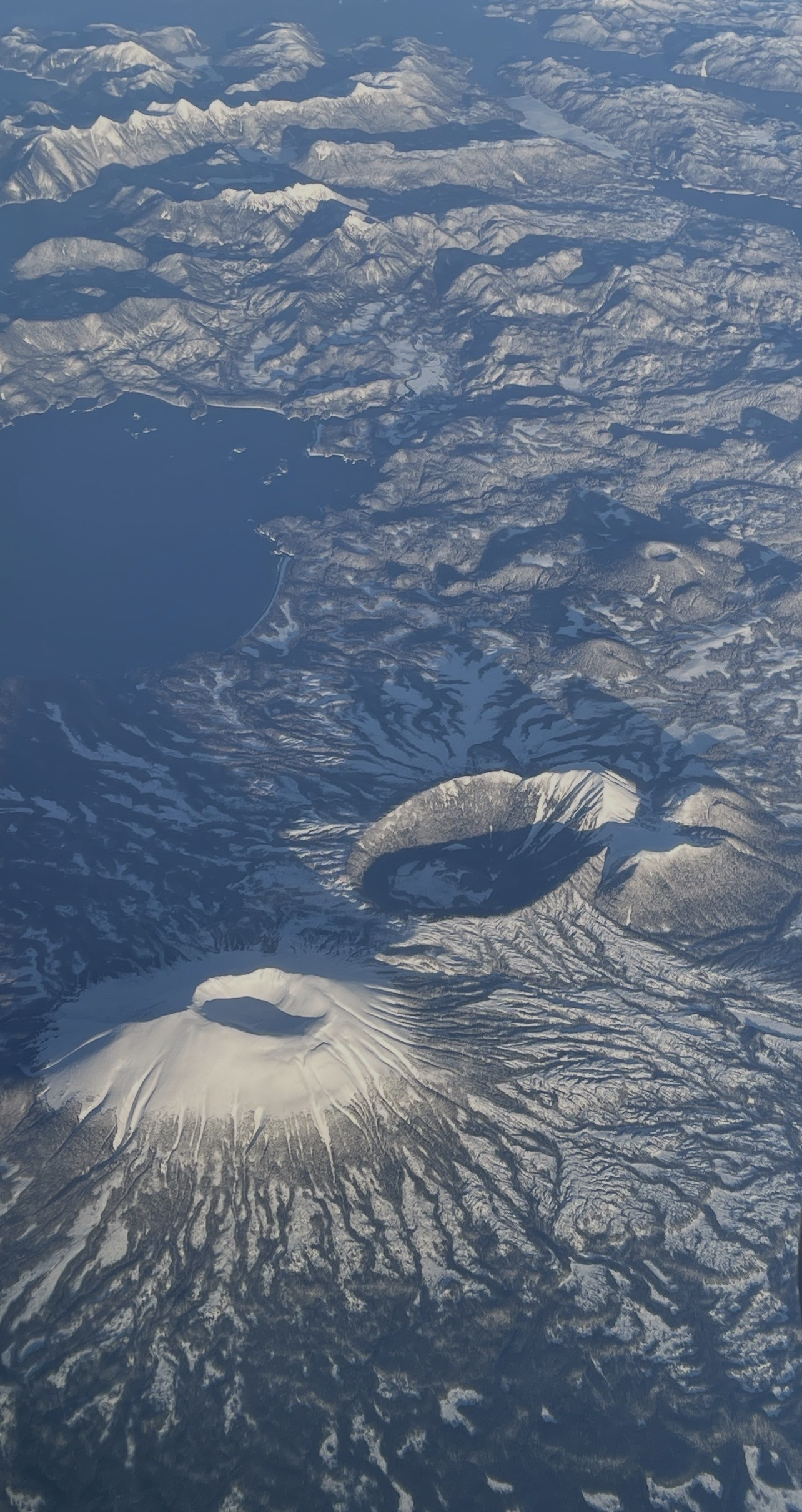
Volcano field on Kruzof Island with Mt. Edgecumbe, Crater Ridge, and several smaller cones.

The island is 37 km (23 mi) long and 13 km (8.1 mi) wide with a land area of 167.47 sq mi (433.7 km^{2}), making it the 41st largest island in the United States. The island is formed in part by Mount Edgecumbe, a small, dormant stratovolcano, and several volcanic cones and collapsed cones that make up its volcanic field.

== Human importance ==
Kruzof Island does not have a permanent resident population. There is a maintained trail leading from Fred's Creek cabin, a United States Forest Service cabin on the inside coast, to the summit of Mount Edgecumbe, as well as several trails across the island.

In January 1813, the Russian exploration ship Neva wrecked just off the island. The survivors made it to shore and established a camp where they subsisted until rescued about a month later. The site of the wreck, and also the survival camp has since been found.

Kalinin Bay, on the northern shore of the island, provided the name for the World War II United States Navy escort aircraft carrier USS Kalinin Bay. From the 1950s through the 1970s, forests on Kruzof Island were the source for clearcut timber extraction.
