= Mount Edgecumbe (Alaska) =

Volcano in Alaska, United States

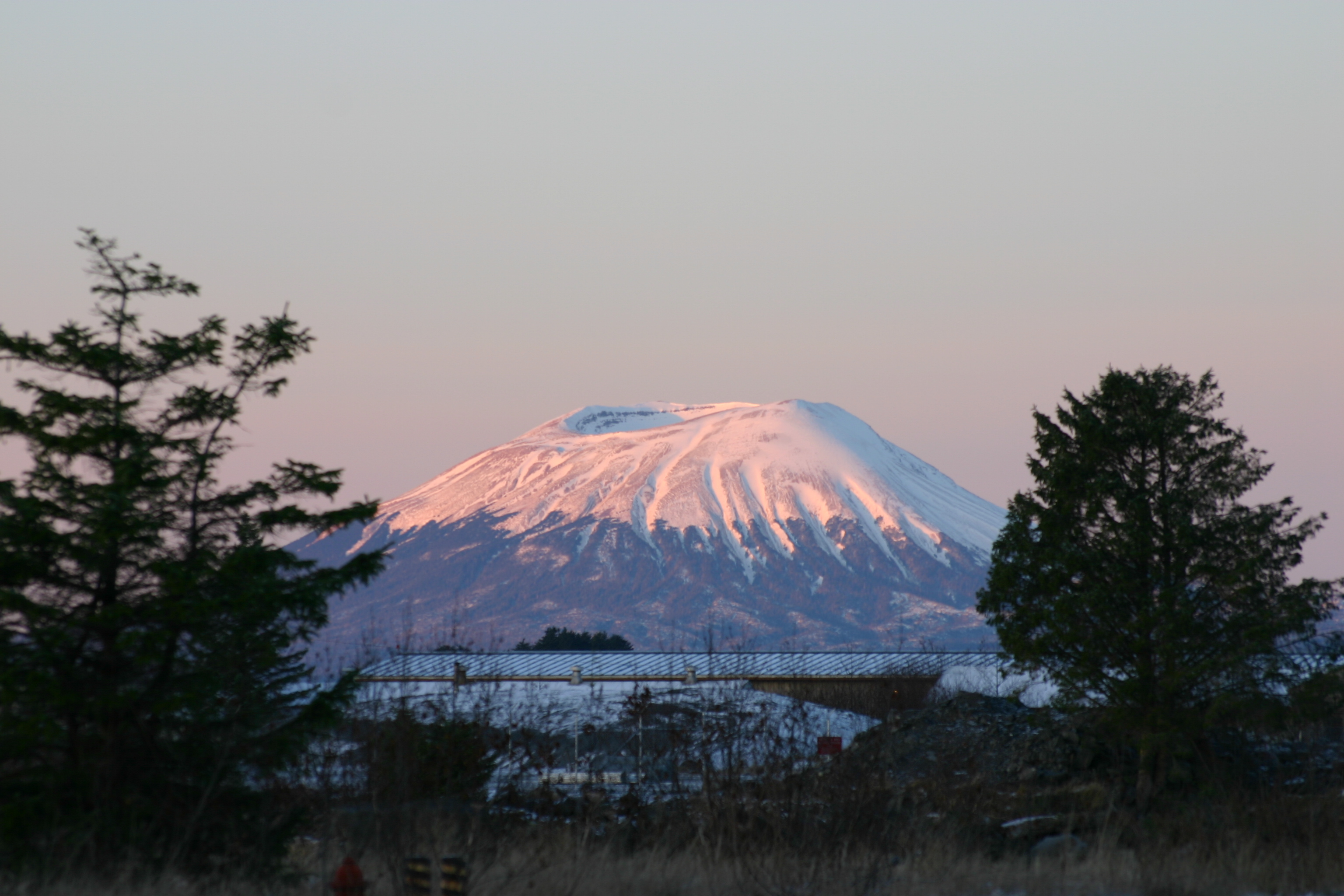
- Mount Edgecumbe in December 2004

Highest point
- Elevation: 3,201 ft (976 m)
- Prominence: 3,201 ft (976 m)
- Listing: Mountains of Alaska
- Coordinates: 57°03′04″N 135°45′38″W

Naming
- Native name: Lʼúx (Tlingit)

Geography
- Location within Alaska
- Interactive map of Mount Edgecumbe
- Location: Kruzof Island, Sitka City and Borough, Alaska, U.S.
- Topo map: USGS Sitka A-6

Geology
- Rock age: < 600,000 yr
- Mountain type(s): Basalt, Basaltic andesite, Andesite.

Climbing
- First ascent: 1805 by Urey Lisianski
- Easiest route: Hike

Mount Edgecumbe (Tlingit: Lʼúx, Russian: Эджком) is a dormant stratovolcano located at the southern end of Kruzof Island, Alaska, about 15 miles (24 km) west of Sitka. The volcano has been dormant for over 800 years. Mount Edgecumbe is about 9.9 miles (16 km) east of the Queen Charlotte Fault that separates the North American and Pacific Plates, and is the highest point in the Mount Edgecumbe volcanic field, an area of about 100 square miles (260 km^{2}) on Kruzof Island that also includes Crater Ridge and Shell Mountain.

Mount Edgecumbe has not had a major eruption in 4000 years. Recent earthquake activity shows magma intrusion at a depth of 3 miles (5 km), but as of 2022, an eruption does not appear to be imminent. It has been classified by the Alaska Volcano Observatory (AVO) as "historically active". Mount Edgecumbe was a prop in a 1974 April Fools' Joke, which involved tricking the citizens of Sitka into believing the volcano was erupting.

== Name ==
The indigenous Tlingit people consider the mountain to be sacred. In the Tlingit language, the mountain is called Lʼúx, which means "to flash" or "blinking", because the Tlingit people first discovered it while it was smoking or erupting.

On August 16, 1775, Spanish explorer Juan de la Bodega named the mountain Montaña de San Jacinto to honor Saint Hyacinth, whose feast day is celebrated on 17 August. Captain James Cook passed the mountain on May 2, 1778, during his third voyage and named it Mount Edgecumbe, presumably after a hill overlooking Plymouth Sound, England, or possibly for George, Earl of Edgcumbe. Explorer George Vancouver later adopted the name chosen by Cook, and it came into popular usage.

== Ascent ==
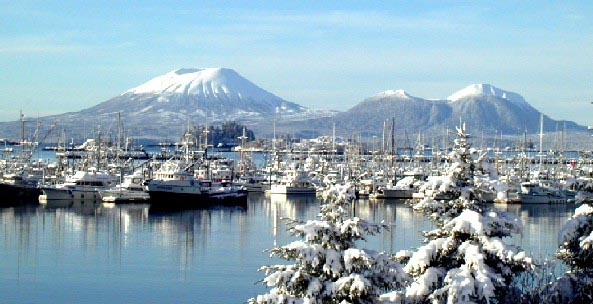
A snow-capped Mount Edgecumbe, with its companion Crater Ridge, as viewed from nearby Baranof Island

The first recorded ascent was made in July 1805 by Captain Urey Lisianski of the Imperial Russian Navy. In the 1930s a trail to the top of the mountain was made by the Civilian Conservation Corps as part of a New Deal program to ease the Great Depression.

The Mt. Edgecumbe Trail is roughly 6.8 miles (11 km), ascending through taiga and muskeg before becoming steep and ending in a barren landscape of snow and red volcanic ash above the treeline, at about 2,000 feet (610 m), with sign-posts directing hikers toward the crater rim. A three-sided cabin built by the Conservation Corps lies about four miles (6 km) up trail. The trail can be muddy and wet in places, the last three miles (5 km) are a steep climb, and bears may be present. The difficulty of the trail is listed as "moderate."

== Eruptions ==
- 7620 BC
- 3810 BC
- 2220 BC ±100 years

=== Eruption hoax ===
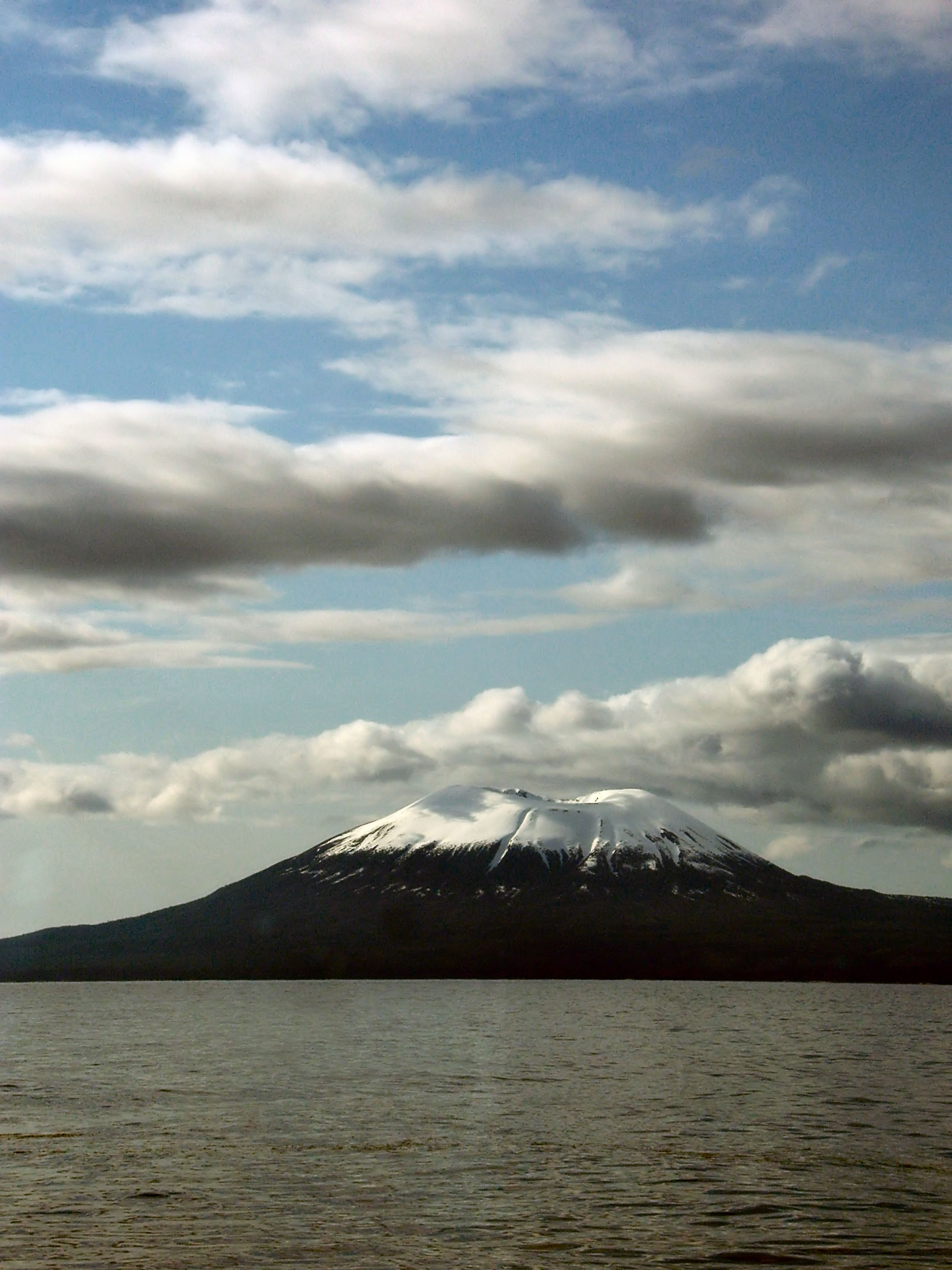
A view toward Mount Edgecumbe

On April 1, 1974, a local prankster named Oliver "Porky" Bickar ignited 70 old kerosene-soaked tires in the crater, which he had flown in by helicopter for an April Fools' Day joke. The dark smoke rising from the crater convinced nearby residents of Sitka, Alaska, that the volcano was erupting. The hoax was soon revealed, as around the rim of the volcano, "April Fool" was spray-painted in 50-foot (15 m) letters. Porky had notified the FAA and the Sitka Police Department beforehand but had forgotten to notify the Coast Guard. The prank made the Associated Press and was printed in newspapers across the country. The Guardian reports that Bickar had been planning the prank for four years, and lists it among the ten best Aprils Fools hoaxes of all time.

== Recent activity ==
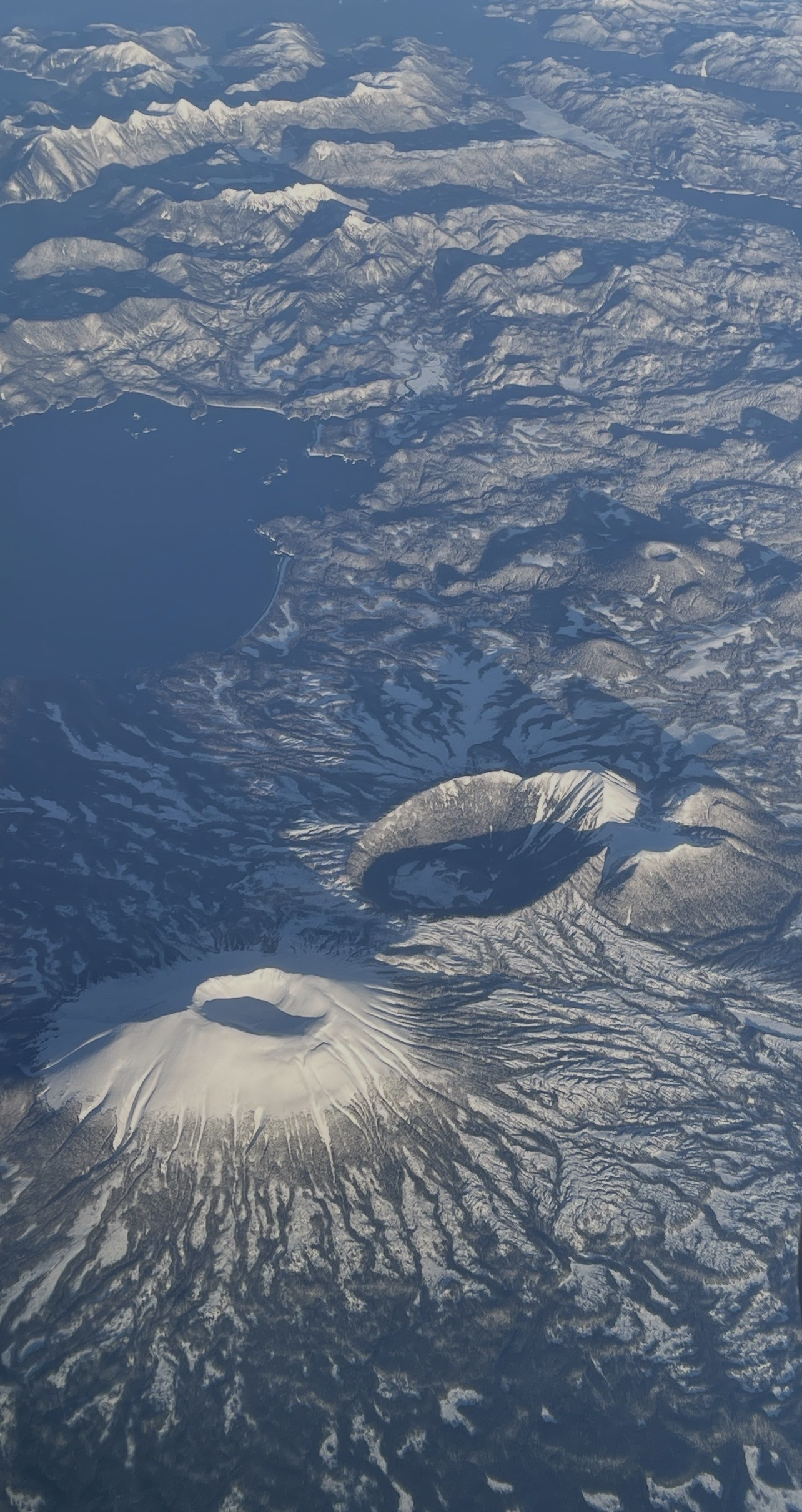
Volcano field on Kruzof Island with Mt. Edgecumbe, Crater Ridge, and several smaller cones.

After about 800 years of "dormancy" at Mount Edgecumbe, researchers observed hundreds of small earthquakes in April 2022. Analysis by the AVO following the swarm revealed deformation starting in August 2018 in an 11-mile (17 km) diameter area to the east of the mountain. Uplift totalled 11 inches (27 cm) since the start and occurred at 3.4 inches (8.7 cm) a year in its center. This deformation is likely related to a magmatic intrusion at 3 miles (5 km) depth, but does not necessarily indicate an impending eruption. "Intrusions of new magma under volcanoes do not always result in volcanic eruptions. The deformation and earthquake activity at Edgecumbe may cease with no eruption occurring. If the magma rises closer to the surface, this would lead to changes in the deformation pattern and an increase in earthquake activity. Therefore, it is very likely that if an eruption were to occur it would be preceded by additional signals that would allow advance warning."

On 23 May 2022 the AVO announced that they had "placed a seismometer and GPS sensor on Kruzof Island to better monitor the Mount Edgecumbe volcanic field. This station will improve our ability to detect smaller earthquakes, locate earthquakes more precisely, and measure deformation."

== See also ==
- List of volcanoes in the United States
