= French frigate Cléopâtre (1781) =

32-gun Vénus class frigate of the French Navy

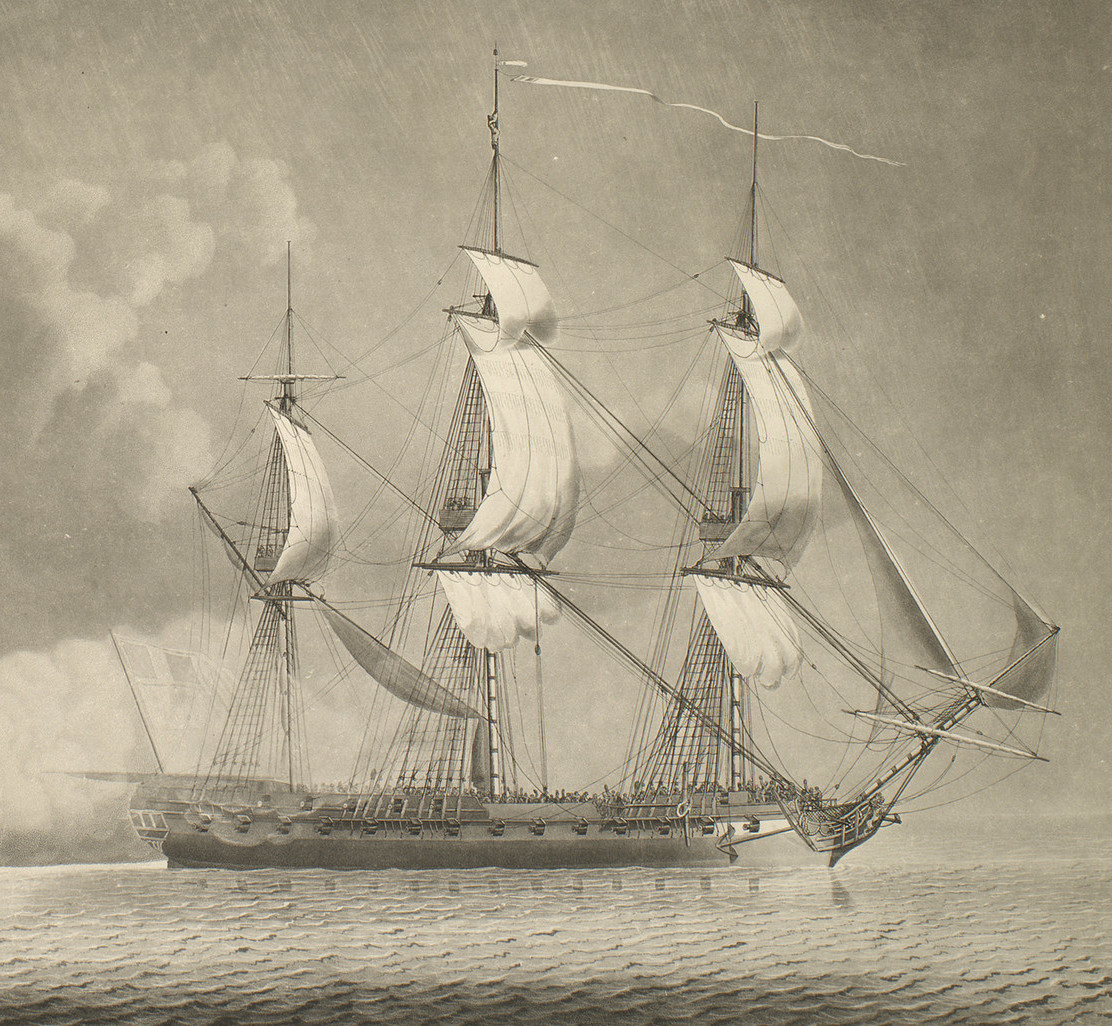
- Cléopâtre at Start Point, Devon in 1793

History

France
- Name: Cléopâtre
- Namesake: Cleopatra
- Builder: Saint Malo
- Laid down: 1780
- Launched: 19 August 1781
- Commissioned: December 1781
- Captured: Captured by the Royal Navy 1793

Great Britain
- Name: Oiseau
- Acquired: 19 June 1793 by capture
- Fate: Broken up 1816

General characteristics
- Class & type: Vénus-class frigate
- Displacement: 1,082 tonneaux
- Tons burthen: 600 port tonneaux; 91316/94 (bm)
- Length: Overall:145 ft 7 3/4 in (44.393 m); Keel: 120 ft 8 7/8 in (36.801 m)
- Beam: 37 ft 8 1/2 in (11.494 m)
- Depth of hold: 11 ft 11 3/4 in (3.651 m)
- Complement: 254 (British service)
- Armament: French service: Originally: 18 × 12-pounder + 14 × 6-pounder long guns; May 1783-1793: 18 × 18-pounder guns vice 12-pounders (Loaded at Trincomalee); 1793:26 x12-pounder guns + 10 × 6-pounder guns; British service: Upper deck: 26 × 12-pounder guns; QD: 8 × 24-pounder carronades; Fc: 2 × 6-pounder guns + 2 × 24-pounder carronades

Cléopâtre was a 32-gun Vénus class frigate of the French Navy. She was designed by Jacques-Noël Sané, and had a coppered hull. She was launched in 1781, and the British captured her in 1793. She then served the Royal Navy as HMS Oiseau until she was broken up in 1816.

== French career and capture ==
Cléopâtre took part in the Battle of Cuddalore in late June 1783, where she was the flagship of Suffren.

On 19 June 1793, as she sailed off Guernsey under Lieutenant de vaisseau Mullon, she encountered HMS Nymphe, under Captain Edward Pellew. During the short but sharp action, Cléopâtre lost her mizzenmast and wheel, and the ship, being unmanageable, fell foul of Nymphe. The British then boarded and captured her in a fierce rush. Mullon, mortally wounded, died while trying to swallow his commission, which, in his dying agony, he had mistaken for the vessel's secret signals. Pellew then sent the signals to the Admiralty.

In the battle Nymphe had 23 men killed and 27 wounded. Pellew estimated the number of French casualties at about 60.

Cléopâtre was the first French frigate taken in the war. In 1847 the Admiralty awarded the Naval General Service Medal with clasp "Nymphe 18 June 1793" to the four surviving claimants from the action.

== British career ==
=== French Revolutionary Wars ===
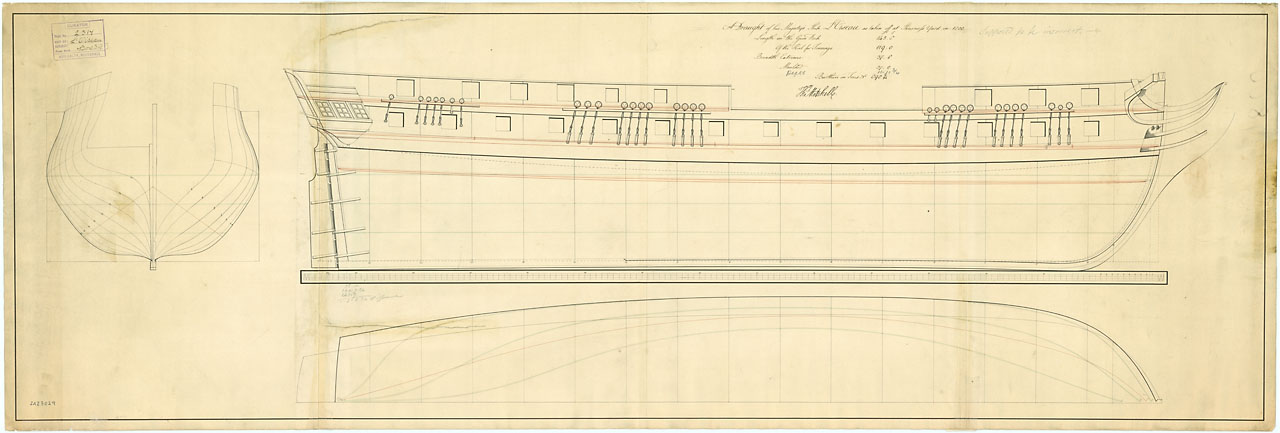
A plan of the Oiseau taken in 1793

The Royal Navy commissioned Cléopâtre as HMS Oiseau in September 1793 under Captain Robert Murray. On 18 May 1794 he sailed her from Plymouth to Halifax in a squadron commanded by Rear-Admiral George Murray. Between 1793 and 1795, the Russian naval officer Yuri Lisyanski sailed aboard Oiseaux as a volunteer. Between 1803 and 1806 he would captain the Russian-American Company's sloop Neva on the first Russian circumnavigation of the world.

In June 1794 Oiseau and Argonaut seized fourteen French vessels of a convoy of 25, all loaded with flour, naval stores, beef, and pork. The vessels were American-owned and had sailed from Hampton Roads with two sets of papers, one set showing the cargo going to England and the other giving their destination as France. The British sent the vessels into Halifax.

In July, Argonaut, Oiseau, Thetis, and Resolution captured Potowmac and True Republican.

On 8 January 1795, Argonaut captured the French Republican warship Esperance on the North America Station. Esperance was armed with 22 guns (4 and 6-pounders), and had a crew of 130 men. She was under the command of lieutenant de vaisseau de St. Laurent and had been out 56 days from Rochfort, bound for the Chesapeake. Argonaut shared the prize money with Oiseaux. Because she was captured in good order and sailed well, Rear Admiral Murray put a British crew aboard and sent Esperance out on patrol with Lynx on 31 January.

In 1798, Oiseau served in the Indian Ocean, where she captured the French Réunion on 1 September. On 21 April 1799 her boats went into Saint Denis on the Íle de Bourbon and cut out two merchant vessels, Denree, which had a cargo of bale goods and coffee, and Augustine, which had a cargo of rum and arrack. Augustine was lost in St. Augustine's Bay.

On 11 March 1800, she was at Cape Town.

On Monday, 26 January 1801, at 8.00 a.m., at 45°N 12°W, Oiseux, under Captain Samuel Hood Linzee fell in with and chased Dédaigneuse, which was bound from Cayenne to Rochefort with despatches. By noon the following day, with Cape Finisterre in sight, Captain Linzee signaled to Sirius and Amethyst, which were in sight, to join the pursuit. Dédaigneuse maintained her lead until 2.00 a.m. on the 28th when came within small arms range. Dédaigneuse opened fire from her stern-chasers, and the two British ships returned fire. After a running fight of 45 minutes, two miles off shore near Cape Bellem, fire primarily from Sirius had cut Dédaigneuse's running rigging and sails ). She had also suffered casualties with several men having been killed, and 17 wounded, including her captain and fifth lieutenant. She then struck her colours. Unfavourable winds kept Amethyst, from getting up before Dédaigneuse had struck. Sirius was the only British ship to sustain any damage (rigging, sails, main-yard and bowsprit) in the encounter and there were no fatalities on the English side. Captain Linzee declared the encounter a long and anxious chase of 42 hours and acknowledged a gallant resistance on the part of Dédaigneuse. At the time of the encounter she was armed with twenty-eight 12-pounder guns. Linzee described her as "a perfect new Frigate, Copper fastened and sails well...". He sent her into Plymouth with a prize crew under the command of his first lieutenant, H. Lloyd. The Admiralty took Dédaigneuse into the Royal Navy under the same name HMS Dedaigneuse.

On 28 January, along with HMS Sirius, she captured 3 French frigates off Ferrol.

On 16 September 1800, Oiseau, Wolverine and the cutter Fly captured Neptunus when Neptunus was going into Havre de Grace. The next day Wolverene brought Neptunus into Portsmouth, together with her cargo of naval stores that Wight had captured

In February 1801 Captain Lord Augustus Fitzroy assumed command.

In mid-afternoon on 16 March the privateer schooner Lord Nelson, Captain Humphrey Gibson, was between the Isle of Wight and Portland when a lugger came into sight, under chase by a larger vessel. Humphrey immediately changed his direction to attempt to cut the lugger off. After a chase of four hours, Lord Nelson caught up with the lugger, which immediately surrendered. The lugger turned out to be the French privateer Espoir, of 14 guns and 75 men, under the command of M. Alegis Ballet. She was two days out of Saint-Malo and had taken nothing. There were no casualties. As Lord Nelson was taking out the prisoners Oiseau, Captain Augustus Fitzroy, came up. (Note: Lord Nelson had a burthen of 69 tons, was armed with eight 3 & 4-pounder guns, and had a crew of 40 men. Espoir had a burthen of 9136/94 tons and was pierced for 16 guns, though she was only carrying 14 when captured.)

Captain John Murray replaced Fitzroy in August, and was replaced in turn in December by Captain John Phillips.

=== Napoleonic Wars ===
In June 1806 Oiseau was commissioned under Lieutenant Walter Kennedy as a prison hulk at Portsmouth. In 1812 Lieutenant William Needham succeeded Kennedy. She was laid up in December, but then lent to the Transport Board.

In 1814 she was under the command of Lieutenant John Bayby Harrison. She was then put in ordinary in 1815.

== Fate ==
Oiseau was advertised for sale on 2 September 1816, and sold for breaking up to a Mr. Rundle for £1500 on 18 September.
