= Nadezhda Strait =

Strait in the Kuril Islands, Russia

Coordinates: 47°54′N 153°06′E

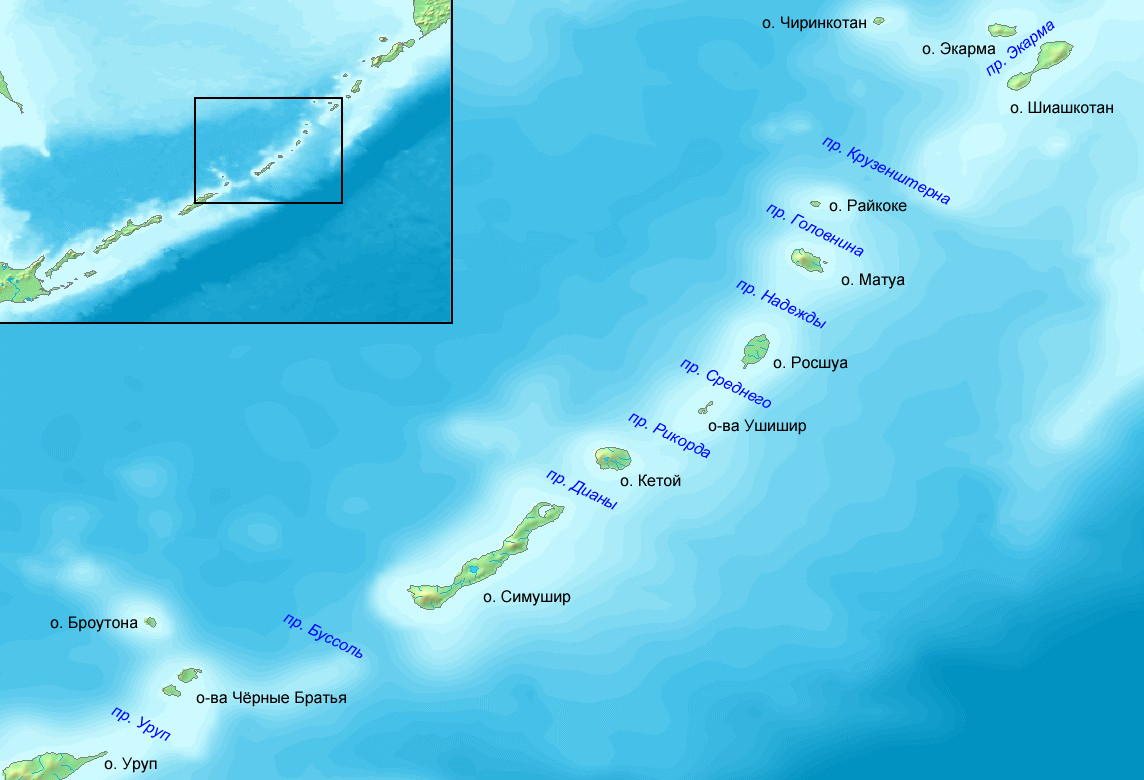
Nadezhda Strait

Nadezhda Strait (Russian: Proliv Nadezhdy; Japanese: Rashowa Kaikyo) is a strait that separates the islands of Matua and Rasshua. It is 25.8 km (about 16 mi) wide. The flood tidal current in the strait sets northwest, while the ebb flows to the southeast. These currents create tide rips and may reach over five knots.

It is named after the sloop Nadezhda (lit. "Hope").

== WWII legacy ==
In the strait's waters, 2,000 meters [6,600 ft] to the south of Matua island, at a depth of 104 meters [341 ft] there is a wreck site of USS Herring, sunk by camouflaged Japanese shore batteries on 1 June 1944.
