= Robert Murray (Royal Navy officer) =

Royal Navy Admiral (c.1763–1834)

Admiral Robert Murray
- Born: c. 1763
- Died: 30 June 1834 (aged 71); South Hill, near Liverpool
- Military career
- Allegiance: United Kingdom of Great Britain and Ireland
- Branch: Royal Navy
- Service years: – 1834
- Rank: Admiral of the White
- Commands: HMS Vestal; HMS Terrier; HMS Blanche; HMS Oiseau; HMS Asia
- Conflicts: American Revolutionary War; Battle of Ushant; French Revolutionary Wars; Napoleonic Wars

Robert Murray (c.1763 – 30 June 1834^{[a]}) was an officer in the Royal Navy who served during the American War of Independence and the French Revolutionary and Napoleonic Wars.

Murray entered the navy at a young age, probably using the patronage of a relation, Captain the Hon. Robert Digby. After service at sea, Murray was serving as a lieutenant during the American War of Independence and saw action at the Battle of Ushant in 1778. He followed Digby to other ships after Digby was promoted to flag rank, and was then given his own commands on the North American Station shortly before the end of the war. He saw some service during the years of peace, commanding a frigate in the Caribbean for a time, before the outbreak of the French Revolutionary Wars brought further opportunities. Murray commanded the frigate HMS Oiseau on the North American station for a time, operating with success against French warships and privateers. Serving under Murray during this time was Yuri Lisyansky, who became an important explorer in the Imperial Russian Navy, and, albeit in name only, Provo Wallis, whom Murray had been persuaded to enter onto his books despite Wallis only being four years old.

Murray moved to command a ship of the line, still at Halifax, after his time in Oiseau, and spent some years as the flag captain of the station commander. Returning to Britain, he was promoted to flag rank himself, but saw little active service. He was appointed as Commander in chief at North Yarmouth in 1811, serving as such until the end of the wars with France. He was promoted to the rank of admiral and busied himself with sailor's welfare, helping to secure the establishment of a floating chapel at Liverpool before his death in 1834.

== Family and early life ==
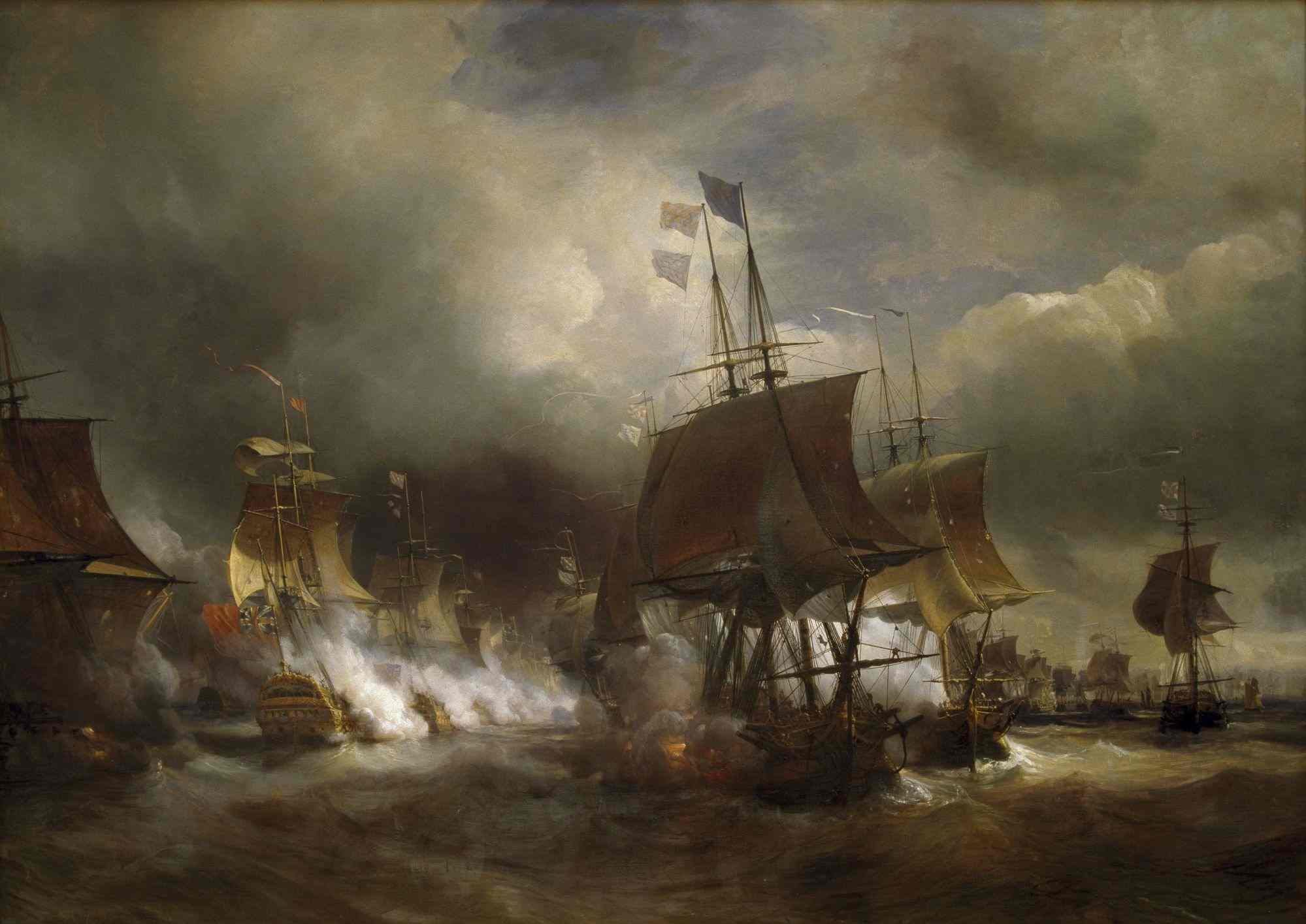
An 1848 depiction of the Battle of Ushant by Jean Antoine Théodore de Gudin. Murray was present during the fighting as a lieutenant aboard HMS Ramillies.

Little is recorded of Murray's early life and service, but he was born circa 1763 and entered the navy at a young age, The Annual Biography and Obituary noting that he "may almost be said to have been cradled on the wave." After a period serving at sea, he was appointed lieutenant aboard the 74-gun HMS Ramillies under Captain the Hon. Robert Digby. Murray was distantly related to Digby, and probably benefited from his patronage. Murray was present at the Battle of Ushant on 27 July 1778, at which the French fleet was defeated at a cost to Ramillies's complement of 28 men killed and wounded. Murray continued to serve with Digby after Digby's promotion to rear-admiral, moving with him to his new flagship, the 98-gun HMS Prince George. Also serving on the Prince George at this time was the young Prince William Henry. After some time serving on this ship, Murray was promoted to commander on 28 April and briefly put in command of the 28-gun HMS Vestal. He left her on his promotion to post-captain on 15 December 1782, towards the end of the American War of Independence. He briefly commanded the newly purchased 16-gun sloop HMS Terrier at New York City in January 1783, but she was broken up at the end of the month.

The naval draw-down after the war meant there was little opportunity for employment. Murray finally received a ship in January 1789, when he was appointed to command the 32-gun HMS Blanche prior to and during the Spanish Armament.^{[b]} He took her out to the Leeward Islands and served there under the station commander, Sir John Laforey, but returned to Britain in 1792.

== French Revolutionary Wars ==
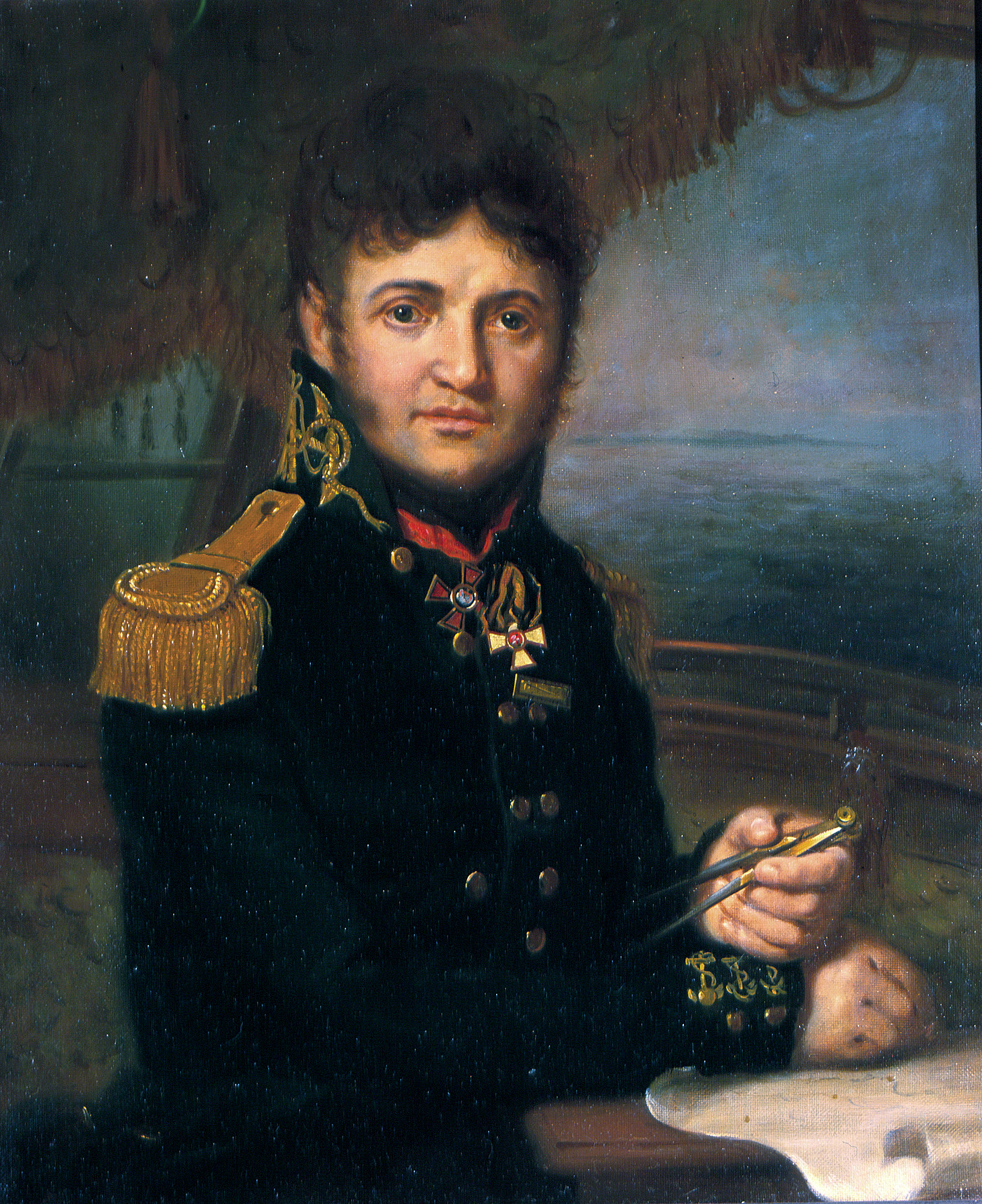
Yuri Lisyansky, 1810, by Volodymyr Borovykovsky. Lisyansky was a volunteer under Murray aboard HMS Oiseau

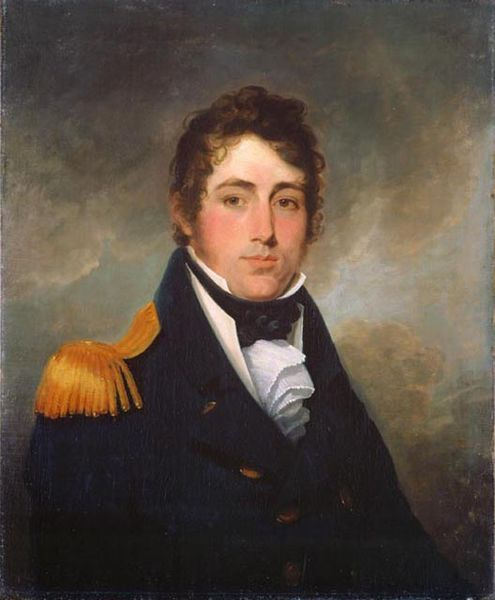
Provo Wallis, 1813, by Robert Field. Wallis was nominally entered aboard Oiseau by Murry, despite being only four years old

With the outbreak of the French Revolutionary Wars, Murray was appointed to command the 36-gun HMS Oiseau in September 1793. He took her out to the Leeward Islands with a squadron under Rear-Admiral George Murray, departing Plymouth on 18 May 1794. Serving aboard Oiseau at this time as a volunteer was the Russian officer Yuri Lisyansky, who later recorded his experiences in his memoirs.^{[c]} Murray commanded Oiseau out of Halifax, where Rear-Admiral Murray's orders were to suppress privateers and intercept French warships. Oiseau took part in the interception of a French-bound merchant convoy off the American coast, and despite the presence of the escorting French frigate Concorde, captured several merchants and an armed brig. After a refit at Halifax, she undertook a winter cruise, but was blown off station by a powerful storm and swept as far south as the West Indies. She was able however to capture, in company with HMS Argonaut, the 22-gun French warship Esperance, off the Chesapeake on 8 January 1795. During this period Murray had the future admiral of the fleet, Provo Wallis, serving aboard his ship, albeit in spirit only. Wallis's father, Provo F. Wallis, was chief clerk at Halifax, and convinced Murray to enter his son on his ship's books as a way of giving the young Wallis sea time, and therefore seniority when it came to promotions. Murray agreed, and the four-year-old Wallis was entered with the rank of able seaman. Murray's decision meant that when Wallis actually came to join a ship, the 32-gun HMS Cleopatra in 1804 at the age of thirteen, he already had nearly ten years of service logged, allowing him to amass 96 years of service in the Royal Navy before his death at the age of 100.^{[d]}

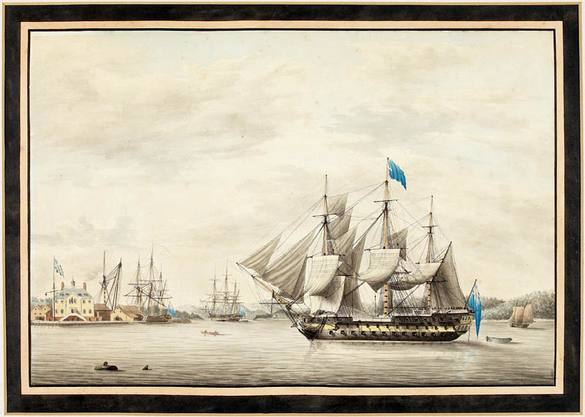
HMS Asia at the Halifax Naval Yard, 1797, during Murray's time in command. Watercolour by George Gustavus Lennox, who was a lieutenant aboard Asia.

After paying Oiseau off in 1795, Murray received an appointment to command the 64-gun HMS Asia and returned to Halifax in August 1796. In October 1798 Asia became the flagship of Vice-Admiral George Vandeput, after his previous flagship, the 74-gun HMS Resolution had been sent back to Britain to be paid off, with Murray remaining in command. Vandeput died in March 1800, and on the arrival of his successor as commander at Halifax, Sir William Parker, Murray returned to Britain to pay Asia off. He had served well during his time as Vandeput's flag-captain, and had been praised for saving the Dockyard in August 1799, when some "daring incendiaries made repeated attempts to set it on fire." On his return to Britain he transported 600 Jamaican Maroons who had been deported from Jamaica the previous year and were now to be settled in Sierra Leone. Asia departed Halifax on 8 August and disembarked the Maroons in Sierra Leone on 30 September.

== Flag rank and later life ==
Murray was promoted to rear-admiral on 23 April 1804, and thereafter rose through the ranks, reaching vice-admiral on 25 October 1809. He was appointed to be Commander in Chief, North Yarmouth in summer 1811, and hoisted his flag aboard HMS Solebay. He held the post until the end of the Napoleonic Wars, and was promoted to admiral on 12 August 1819, though he never again served actively. He remained interested in naval affairs in his retirement, and in 1821 played an important part in the establishment of a floating chapel at Liverpool for the use of sailors, persuading the Admiralty to loan them HMS Tees for the purpose. He had at least two sons during his life, who followed their father into the navy and by the time of his death had reached the ranks of commander and lieutenant. He also had a son, Robert Sherbourne Murray (1808–1852), a Major in the Army, who died in Dublin. Admiral Robert Murray died on 30 June 1834 at his residence, South Hill, near Liverpool, at the age of 71 and the rank of admiral of the white.

== Notes ==
a. Sources disagree on the exact date of Murray's death. The Annual Biography and Obituary uses 30 June, while The Gentleman's Magazine uses 31 June. There are only thirty days in the month of June, so The Gentleman's Magazine may be in error.

b. Sources say that Murray was appointed to a 32-gun frigate named HMS Blonde in this period, which they suggest was a captured French ship. However the 32-gun HMS Blonde captured in 1760 had been wrecked in 1782. A later British-built HMS Blonde entered service in 1789, but Winfield's British Warships in the Age of Sail records she was commanded by Captain William Affleck in this period. A captured former French frigate, the 32-gun HMS Hebe was also in the Royal Navy at this time, though she was only renamed Blonde in 1805, and was not in commission in 1789. Winfield instead records Murry as being appointed to the 32-gun Blanche in 1789, and serving in command until 1792.

c. Lisyansky became a prominent officer and explorer after his return to the Imperial Russian Navy, serving on the first Russian circumnavigation of the globe under Adam Johann von Krusenstern. While in the West Indies he was struck by yellow fever, and later recalled how Murray had helped his recovery, even giving up part of his own accommodation for the sick Lisyansky.

d. In his long career Wallis served during the War of 1812 and as second lieutenant of HMS Shannon, was present at the capture of USS Chesapeake, and commanded the prize crew that took her to Halifax. His time in command qualified him for further promotions before the end of the Napoleonic Wars, and he rose to the rank of admiral in 1863, and admiral of the fleet in 1877. The Admiralty suggested he retire when he reached his nineties, as being on the active list meant he was liable for calling up for a seagoing command. Wallis instead replied he was ready to accept one, and remained on the active list until his death in 1892.
