= Samuel Hood Linzee =

Vice-Admiral Samuel Hood Linzee
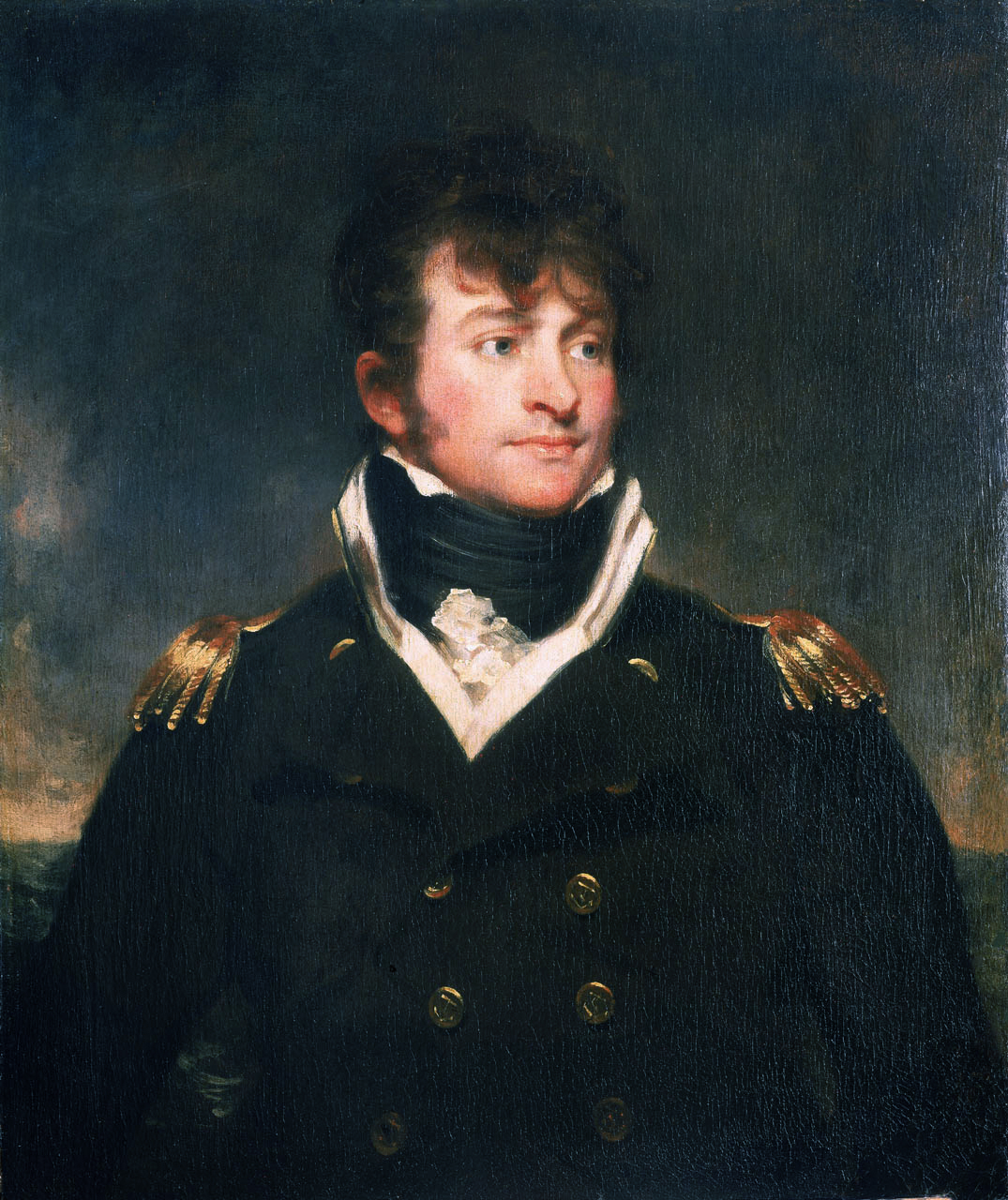
- Portrait of Samuel Hood Linzee, 1802 by Sir Martin Archer Shee
- Born: 27 December 1773; Plymouth, Devon
- Died: 1 September 1820 (aged 46); Stonehouse, Devon
- Military career
- Allegiance: Great Britain; United Kingdom
- Branch: Royal Navy
- Rank: Vice-Admiral
- Commands: Nemesis; Oiseau; Zealous; Warrior; Maida; Barfleur; Triumph; Dreadnought; Temeraire; Union
- Conflicts: French Revolutionary Wars; Napoleonic Wars

Vice-Admiral Samuel Hood Linzee (27 December 1773 – 1 September 1820) was a Royal Navy officer who served in the French Revolutionary and Napoleonic Wars.

== Biography ==
Linzee was born in Plymouth, Devon, the son of John Linzee and Susannah Inman, and named in honour of Samuel Hood, 1st Viscount Hood, who was married to his father's cousin, Susannah. His father was a Royal Navy captain, and had served during the American War, commanding the sloop Falcon from October 1774 until after July 1776, and saw action at the Battle of Bunker Hill in 1775. Although his infant son Samuel's name appeared on the ship's muster roll as captain's servant and senior clerk, it is highly improbable that Samuel was on board the ship, but it did count towards the years of sea time necessary for all candidates for a lieutenant's commission. Samuel Linzee subsequently received his on 21 July 1790, aged only sixteen and a half. He was promoted to commander on 5 November 1793, and to post-captain on 8 March 1794, only two months past his 20th birthday, and given command of the 28-gun sixth-rate frigate Nemesis.

On 9 December 1795, the French frigate Sensible and corvette Sardine captured Nemesis while she was at anchor in the neutral port of Smyrna. Nemesis did not resist and Linzee protested the illegality of the action. The British frigates Aigle and Cyclops blockaded the three ships until Ganteaume's squadron drove the British ships off. The French sailed Nemesis to Tunis in January 1796, but the British recaptured her on 9 March. Linzee travelled home via Venice, Vienna, Dresden, Prague, and Berlin, and eventually returned to England in a packet boat from Hamburg in mid-1796.

At 8 a.m. on 26 January 1801, Linzee, newly in command of the 36-gun frigate, Oiseau (the former Cléopâtre) sighted the French 36-gun frigate Dédaigneuse, which was bound from Cayenne to Rochefort with despatches. The Oiseau pursued Dédaigneuse alone until noon the next day when, with Cape Finisterre in sight, the frigates Sirius and Amethyst joined the chase. Eventually Dédaigneuse surrendered to the Oiseau around 2.45 p.m. on the 28th, and was taken into service in the Royal Navy.

Linzee commanded the 74-gun ship Zealous during the Battle of Copenhagen on 2 April 1801, and was in the fleet of Rear Admiral George Campbell which sailed from England to Port Royal in 1802, and returned to England in May of that year.

He commanded the 74-gun Warrior from early 1805 until April 1806, and was part of Sir Robert Calder's fleet when he engaged a combined French and Spanish fleet at the Battle of Cape Finisterre on 22 July 1805.

In February 1807 Linzee was appointed commander of the 74-gun ship Maida. One of his first duties, on 6 March, was to sit on the court martial of Sir Home Riggs Popham after the failed invasion of South America. On 19 July 1807 he commanded Maida in the bombardment of Copenhagen and the capture of the Danish fleet.

Linzee went to command the Barfleur for a brief period in January and February 1809, the Triumph from 1809 to 1811, the Dreadnought from August 1810 to December 1811, Temeraire in March 1812, and then the Union from April to August 1812. He was appointed a Colonel of Marines on 20 July 1811.

Linzee was promoted to the flag rank of Rear Admiral of the Blue on 12 August 1812, then to Rear Admiral of the White on 4 December 1812, Rear Admiral of the Red on 4 June 1813, and finally to Vice-Admiral of the Blue on 12 August 1819.

== Death ==
Linzee died on 1 September 1820, at his home at Stonehouse, Devon, at the age of 46, after an attack of apoplexy caused him to fall from his horse a few days before. A monument can be found in the north aisle of the Church of St. Andrews, Plymouth.

== Personal life ==
Linzee first married Miss J. Clark, at the Cape of Good Hope, South Africa, in July 1799. She and her baby died during childbirth on 28 August 1800, at Greenwich. On 7 September 1802 Linzee married Emily Wooldridge, the daughter of Captain William Wooldridge, at St Andrew's Church, Plymouth. They had nine children; the first three, all boys, were stillborn, while the fourth, named Samuel Hood Linzee, was born in August 1806, but died of smallpox on 26 December the same year. The fifth child, Emily Wooldridge Linzee, was born on 27 September 1807. The sixth, also Samuel Hood Linzee, was born on 19 December 1809, and was drowned off Cape Frio on 11 July 1831, aged only 22, while serving as a lieutenant aboard Warspite. The seventh child, John Linzee was born 22 September 1812, while the eighth, Susanna Inman Linzee, was born on 17 December 1815. The ninth and final child, Mary Ann Charlotte Linzee was born on 26 January 1818.
