= Nadezhda (1802 Russian ship) =

Russian exploration sloop

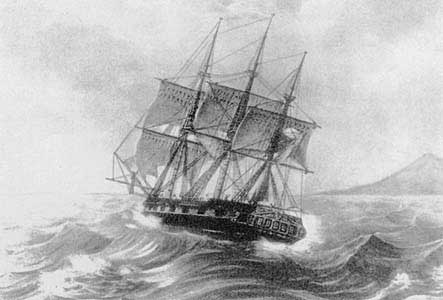
- The sloop Nadezhda

History

Great Britain
- Name: Leander
- Namesake: Leander
- Owner: T. Huggins
- Launched: 1799
- Fate: Sold 1802

Russian Empire
- Name: Nadezhda
- Namesake: Russian: Надежда, "Hope"
- Owner: Russian-American Company (RAC)
- Acquired: 1802
- Fate: Crushed by ice December 1808

General characteristics
- Tons burthen: 425, or 429, or 430 bm
- Complement: Leander:45; Nadezhda:68
- Armament: Leander: 22 × 9-pounder guns, or 24 × 18-pounder guns + 2 × 9-pounder carronades (Note: This 26-cannon armament comes from the letter of marque. It is almost certainly a mistake as that would be heavy armament for a naval sloop, and would require a much larger crew than 45 men. It is more probably that the armament the owners actually mounted, or intended to mount, was twenty-four 18-pounder and two 9-pounder carronades.); Nadezhda: 16 guns

Nadezhda (or Nadeshda, or Nadeshada ) was a three-masted sloop, the ex-British merchantman and slave ship Leander, launched in 1799. A French privateer captured her in 1801, but she quickly came back into British hands. Private Russian parties purchased her in 1802 for the first Russian circumnavigation of the world (1803-1806), and renamed her. Although it is common to see references to the "frigate Nadezhda", she was a sloop, not a frigate, and she was never a warship. After her voyage of exploration she served as a merchant vessel for her owner, the Russian-American Company, and was lost in 1808.

== Career ==
=== British merchant vessel ===
Leander was launched in London in late 1799 as a merchant sloop. On 3 December 1799 her master, C. Anderson, received a letter of marque. The 1800 and 1801 editions of Lloyd's Register showed her launch year as 1799, Anderson as her master, T. Huggins as her owner, and her trade as London-Africa.

Enslaving voyage (1800): Captain Christopher Anderson sailed from London on 21 January 1800. Leander acquired captives at Bonny. She arrived at Kingston, Jamaica on 10 October and there delivered 361 captives. She sailed for London on 29 November. She never arrived at London because on 17 January 1801, a French privateer of 22 guns and 160 men captured Leander as she approached England.

In 1801, 23 British enslaving ships were lost. The source for this data does not show any vessels being lost on the homeward-ward bound leg of their voyage, but absent detailed information on individual vessels, it is difficult to distinguish a returning West Indiaman from a returning Guineaman. During the period 1793 to 1807, war, rather than maritime hazards or resistance by the captives, was the greatest cause of vessel losses among British slave vessels.

The 1801 Lloyd's Register carried the annotation "Captured", but crossed out. It also showed O. Brown as master, replacing Anderson, P. Campbell as owner, replacing Huggins, and her trade as Grenada, replacing London–Africa. How Leander came back into British hands is, as of December 2022, obscure.

=== Russian exploration ship ===
In 1802 Yuri Fydorovich Lisyansky purchased Leander and another merchantman, Thames, for his planned voyage of exploration. The two vessels together cost £17,000, with an additional expense of £5,000 for repairs.

The two vessels left England for the Baltic in May 1803, docking at Kronstadt on 5 June. There the Russians renamed Leander to Nadezhda and Thames to Neva. Czar Alexander 1 chose their names, but the two vessels were never part of the Russian navy.

The two ships took part in the first Russian circumnavigation of the world, with Nadezhda serving as Admiral Krusenstern's flagship. The expedition failed, however, to achieve two of its main goals, to establish diplomatic relations with Japan, and to secure trading rights to Canton.

Krusenstern and Captain Yury Nevelskoy of Neva prepared for the voyage by first serving with the British Royal Navy from 1793 to 1799 to build their naval skills. Nadezhda had a 58-member crew and carried 16 guns. She apparently sailed under the auspices of the Russian-American Company (RAC). As part of her circumnavigation she delivered RAC cargo to Kamchatka, and the first Russian embassy under Nikolai Rezanov to Japan. Another passenger was the nobleman and adventurer Fyodor Ivanovich Tolstoy. He managed so to annoy captain and crew that Krusenstern finally left him at Kamchatka.

Nadezhda and Neva left Kronstadt on 7 August 1803. They sailed down the Baltic Sea, across the Atlantic Ocean, and past the Canary Islands and Brazil. After this they rounded Cape Horn and set across the Pacific Ocean, making stops at the Marquesas, the Aleutian Islands, and the Sandwich (Hawaiian) Islands, and also at Kamchatka.

They then separated at the Sandwich Islands. Nadezhda sailed to Japan to deliver the Russian ambassador, while Neva went on to visit the Russian settlements on the north-west coast of America. One passenger aboard Nadezhda was Fabian Gottlieb von Bellingshausen, who between 1819 and 1821 would lead a second Russian circumnavigation of the world. Another passenger was the Russian explorer Otto von Kotzebue, the stepson of Kruzenstern's sister.

In 1805 the Swiss Johann Caspar Horner and the Prussian Georg Heinrich von Langsdorff, two scientists traveling on Nadezhda, made a hot air balloon out of Japanese paper (washi) to demonstrate the new technology to some 30 Japanese delegates.

After visiting Japan, Nadezhda sailed to China and Macao. Nadezhda and Neva briefly reunited, then Nadezhda rounded Africa and came back across the Baltic Sea to Kronstadt, arriving 19 August 1806.

== Fate ==
In 1808 an American merchant, D. Martin, chartered Nadezhda to transport RAC cargoes from Kronstadt to New York City. During the trip, in December she became ice-locked near Denmark and was destroyed. Lloyd's List reported that "Nadeshda...is captured by the Danes, and is lost off Malmoe".

== Name ==
Her name was the namesake of a gulf and Nadezhda Strait in the Okhotsk Sea, four capes in the Japan Sea and the Tatar Strait, and the Nadezhda Island (Sitka County, Alaska) in the Pacific Ocean.

== Commemorative coins ==
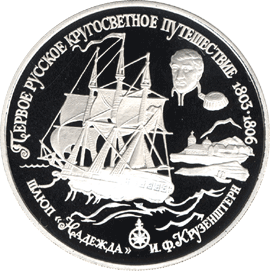
Commemorative coin showing Nadezhda

In 1993 Russia issued three coins to commemorate the first Russian voyage around the world. One was a 150-roubles platinum coin showing both Nadezhda and Neva on the reverse. The other two were both 25-roubles palladium coins, one for Nadezhda and one for Neva.

== See also ==
- European and American voyages of scientific exploration
