= HMS Esperance (1795) =

Sailing Ship

History

America
- Builder: American
- Launched: 1781
- Fate: Sold 1784

Great Britain
- Name: Clementina
- Owner: Moss & Co.; Brent & co.
- Acquired: 1784
- Renamed: Ellis
- Captured: July 1793

France
- Name: Elize
- Acquired: July 1793 by capture
- Captured: Summer 1793

Spain
- Acquired: Summer 1793 by capture
- Captured: November 1793

France
- Acquired: November 1793 by capture
- Renamed: Esperance
- Captured: 8 January 1795

Great Britain
- Name: HMS Esperance
- Acquired: 8 January 1795 by capture
- Fate: Sold 7 June 1798

General characteristics
- Type: Ship-sloop
- Displacement: 400 tons (French)
- Tons burthen: 280, or 300, or 3259/94, or 333, or 345(bm)
- Propulsion: Sails
- Complement: Ellis:100 men; Elize: 150 men>; HMS Esperance: 121 men
- Armament: Clementina: 4 × 4-pounder guns; Ellis: 22 × 6-pounder guns; Elize: 22 × 6-pounder guns; HMS Esperance: 16 cannon

HMS Esperance was launched in America in 1781, and is first listed in Lloyd's Register in 1784 under the name Clementina. She then served as a slave ship, sailing out of Liverpool on two slave trading voyages. In 1786 Brent and Co. purchased her, renamed her Ellis, and sailed her for three more voyages as a slaver. In 1793 she became the privateer Ellis. The French captured her, then the Spanish, and then the French recaptured her. After returning to French ownership, she became the French corvette Esperance. The Royal Navy captured her in 1795 and took her into service as HMS Esperance. Thus, in her career, Esperance had changed hands six times. She was sold in 1798.

== Early history ==
The vessel that became Esperance was built in America and launched in 1781, probably under the name Clementina. She first appeared in Lloyd's Register in 1783.

1st slave trading voyage (1783–1784): Captain John Elworthy sailed from Liverpool on 19 September 1783. Clementina acquired her slaves in Congo North and arrived at Charleston on 29 March 1784 with 440 slaves. She sailed from Charleston on 2 July 1784 and arrived back at Liverpool on 5 August 1784. She had left Liverpool with 42 crew members and she suffered seven crew deaths on her voyage.

2nd slave trading voyage (1784–1785): Captain Elworthy sailed from Liverpool on 7 December 1784. Clementina acquired her slaves at Bonny and arrived at Kingston, Jamaica on 3 June 1785 with 422. She sailed from Kingston on 24 July and arrived back at Liverpool on 16 September. She had left Liverpool with 44 crew members and she suffered 19 crew deaths on the voyage.

In 1786 Bent & Co. purchased Clementina and renamed her Ellis, presumably after Ellis Bent, one of her owners. She remained in the slave trade.

3rd slave trading voyage (1786–1788): Captain John Ford sailed from Liverpool on 19 April 1786. Ellis acquired her slaves at Calabar and delivered then to Grenada. She arrived at Grenada on 4 April 1788 with 33 slaves. She left Grenada on 19 May and arrived back at Liverpool on 24 June. She had left Liverpool with 50 crew members and suffered 20 crew deaths over her journey of 716 days.

Between her return and her next voyage, Ellis was almost completely rebuilt, and from the change in subsequent reports of her burthen, enlarged.

4th slave trading voyage (1789–1791): Captain Joseph Matthews sailed from Liverpool on 3 June 1789 and arrived in Africa on 8 October. Ellis gathered her slaves first at Cape Coast Castle and then at Anomabu. She arrived at the island of St Vincent with 389 slaves, and landed 380. At some point Captain Thomas Given replaced Matthews as he was her master when she arrived at St Vincent. Ellis sailed from St Vincent on 17 February 1791 and arrived back at Liverpool on 30 March. She had left Liverpool with 42 crew members and she suffered five crew deaths on her voyage.

5th slave trading voyage (1791–1792): Captain Given sailed from Liverpool on 29 June 1791 and arrived in Africa on 24 August. She gathered her slaves at Bonny and sailed from Africa on 11 November. She arrived at Montego Bay on 5 January 1792. She had embarked 400 slaves and arrived with 346. She sailed from Montego Bay on 6 February and arrived back at Liverpool on 24 March. She had left Liverpool with 30 crew embers and suffered four crew deaths on her voyage. There is a parallel record, also for 1791–1792, that Ellis under the command of Thomas Heart, and with the same itinerary. It, however, records Ellis as embarking 464 slaves and arriving with 455. There is no evidence in Lloyd's List's ship arrival and departure data for the period of any vessel with Heart, master.

The history of Clementina/Ellis, as outlined in Lloyd's Register is at the end of the article in the section Lloyd's Register. The entries in Lloyd's Register are broadly consistent with respect to masters' names and years with those from the database on slave voyages.

In 1793, Bent & Co. decided to use Ellis as a privateer. Ellis, with John Levingston as master, received a letter of marque on 3 June 1793.

== Three times captured (1793) ==
The French frigate Gracieuse, under the command of Captain Chevillard, captured Ellis on 22 July 1793.

The French took her into service as Elise. Later that summer the Spanish captured her. In November ownership returned to the French who renamed her Esperance.

On 8 June 1794, Esperance arrived in Jacmel, Saint-Domingue (present-day Haiti), from France with the official proclamation of the abolition of slavery, which Léger-Félicité Sonthonax, as one of the Civil Commissioners of Saint-Domingue, had already unilaterally declared for the French colony the year before amid a slave rebellion and attacks from British and Spanish forces. Ironically, Esperance also brought the news to the Civil Commissioners that the National Convention had impeached them on 16 July 1793 and ordered them to return promptly to France. (Note: "...the corvette L'esperance dropped anchor, bearing Robespierre's warrant for the Commissioners' arrest and return to Paris to account for their stewardship.")

== Capture (1795) ==
On 8 January 1795, Argonaut, under the command of Captain Alexander John Ball, captured Esperance on the North America station. Esperance was armed with 22 guns (4 and 6-pounders), and had a crew of 130 men. She was under the command of lieutenant de vaisseau De St. Laurent and had been out 56 days from Rochfort, bound for the Chesapeake. Argonaut shared the prize money with Oiseau, under Captain Robert Murray.

The French ambassador to the United States registered a complaint with the President of the United States that Argonaut, by entering Lynnhaven bay, either before she captured Esperance or shortly thereafter, had violated a treaty between France and the United States. The French also accused the British of having brought Esperance into Lynnhaven for refitting for a cruise. The President passed the complaint to the Secretary of State, who forwarded the complaint to the Governor of Virginia. The Governor inquired into the matter of the British Consul at Virginia. The British Consul replied that the capture had taken place some 10 leagues off shore. The weather had forced Argonaut and her prize to shelter within the Chesapeake for some days, but that they had left as soon as practicable. Furthermore, Argonaut had paroled her French prisoners when she came into Lynnhaven, and if she had entered American territorial waters solely to parole her French prisoners no one would have thought that objectionable. The authorities in Virginia took a number of depositions but ultimately nothing further came of the matter.

== Royal Navy service ==
Because she was captured in good order and sailed well, Rear Admiral George Murray, the British commander in chief of the North American station, put a British crew aboard and sent Esperance out on patrol with Lynx, under the command of John Poo Beresford, on 31 January.

On 1 March the two vessels captured the Cocarde Nationale (or National Cockade), a privateer from Charleston, South Carolina, of 14 guns, six swivels and 80 men. Esperance and Lynx recaptured the ship Norfolk, of Belfast, and the brig George, of Workington.

On 20 July, Esperance, in company with the frigates Thetis and Hussar, intercepted the American vessel Cincinnatus, of Wilmington, sailing from Ireland to Wilmington. They pressed many men on board, narrowly exempting the Irish revolutionary Wolfe Tone, who was going to Philadelphia.

Esperance was formally commissioned into the Royal Navy in August under Commander Jonas Rose.

On 4 May 1796 Esperance was sailing in company with Spencer and Bonetta when they sighted a suspicious vessel. Spencer set off in chase while shortly thereafter Esperance saw two vessels, a schooner and a sloop, and she and Bonetta set off after them. Spencer sailed south-southeast and the other two British vessels sailed southwest by west, with the result that they lost sight of each other. Spencer captured the French gun-brig Volcan, while Bonetta and Esperance captured the schooner Poisson Volant.

Poisson Volant was sailing from Aux Cayes to New York and turned out to be the former HMS Flying Fish that two French privateers had captured in June 1795 while she was on her way to Jamaica. At the time of her recapture she had some eight or ten days earlier met with the French ship Concorde. She was under the command of a sub-lieutenant from Concorde and had a crew of 38 men. Poisson Volant's crew had cut down her gunwales and thrown some of her guns overboard during the chase.

== Fate ==
Esperance arrived at Portsmouth on 3 November 1797 and was paid off. On 31 May 1798 the Admiralty listed for sale "the Esperance Sloop, Burthen 3259/94 tons". She was sold on 7 June 1798 for £600.

== Lloyd's Register ==
Year	Name	Master	Owner	Trade	Notes
1783	Clementina	J. Elworthy	Thomas Moss & Co.	Liverpool - Africa	280 tons (bm); American built, launched 1781
1784	Clementina	J. Elworthy	Thomas Moss & Co.	Liverpool - Africa	Ditto.
1785					Unavailable online
1786	Ellis	Jn. Ford	Bent & Co.	Liverpool – Africa	280 tons (bm); American built, launched 1781. Annotation: Florentine ’83 Note: there is no Florentine in 1783.
1787	Ellis	J. Ford	Bent & Co.	Liverpool – Africa	280 tons (bm); American built, launched 1781.
1788					Unavailable online
1789	Ellis	J. Ford; J. Mathews	Bent & Co.	Africa – Liverpool; Liverpool – Africa	280 tons (bm); American built, launched 1781; almost rebuilt
1790	Ellis	J. Matthews	R. Bent & Co.	Liverpool - Africa	300 tons; American built, launched 1781
1791	Ellis	Matthews; Illegible; T. Gibbons	Bent & Co.	Liverpool - Africa	Ditto.
1792	Ellis	T. Gibbons	R. Bent & Co.	Liverpool–Africa	333 tons (bm); American built, launched 1781
1793	Ellis	Gibbons; J. Leviston	Bent & Co.	Liverpool –Africa	333 tons (bm); American built, launched 1781; 6-pounder guns
