= Marquis of Huntley (1804 Dutch ship) =

British merchantman and whaler 1804–1809

History

United Kingdom
- Name: Marquis of Huntley
- Namesake: Marquess of Huntly
- Acquired: 1804 by purchase of a prize
- Fate: Foundered November 1809

General characteristics
- Tons burthen: 350, or 355 (bm)
- Complement: 1804:45; 1807:40
- Armament: 1804:4 × 6-pounder guns + 16 × 12-pounder carronades + 6 swivel guns; 1807:8 × 12-pounder carronades; 1809:2 × 6-pounder guns

Marquis of Huntley was built in Holland under another name. She was taken in prize circa 1803 and became a slave ship in the triangular trade in enslaved people. She made two complete voyages; with the end of the British slave trade she first traded with the Baltic and then made one voyage from Hull as a whaler in the northern whale fishery. She foundered in 1809 while returning to England from the Baltic.

== Career ==
Marquis of Huntley first appeared in Lloyd's Register (LR) in 1804.

Year	Master	Owner	Trade	Source
1804	Hamilton	Geddes & Co.	London–Angola	LR

1st enslaving voyage (1804–1805): Captain Hance Hamilton acquired a letter of marque on 18 July 1804. Marquis of Huntley sailed from London on 19 August 1804. She acquired captives at the Congo River and arrived on 21 March 1805 at Charleston, United States, with 381 captives. She arrived back at London on 15 July.

On 3 February 1806 a Marquis of Huntley arrived at Portsmouth from London and on her way to Africa. On 19 December, Marquis of Huntley, Allard or Allens, master, returned to Gravesend from the coast of Guinea.

Year	Master	Owner	Trade	Source
1806	Hamilton; R.Marton	Geddes & Co.	London–Angola	LR

2nd enslaving voyage (1807–1808): Captain Robert Martin acquired a letter of marque on 20 May 1807. However, Marquis of Huntley left London on 1 May. Parliament passed the Slave Trade Act 1807, which ended British involvement in the trans-Atlantic slave trade; it took effect on 1 May. Marquis of Huntley had cleared Customs before 1 May and so her voyage was legal. She sailed via Portsmouth and Madeira. She arrived at Gorée and then sailed for the Gold Coast.

Marquis of Huntley started acquiring captives on 5 August 1807 at Bonny. She arrived at Dominica on 29 February 1808 with 360 captives. She had embarked 445 captives. That would imply a 24% mortality rate on the Middle Passage between Africa and the West Indies.

Year	Master	Owner	Trade	Source
1808	R.Morton; G.Corbett; Mathison	Geddes & Co.	London–Africa; London–Riga	LR
1809	G.Corbett; Mitchellson	Geddes & Co. Barnaby	London–Riga	LR
1810	Mitchelson	Barnaby	Hull–Greenland	LR

Marquis of Huntley was reported in July to have been in the Davis Strait, where she had taken 14 "fish" (whales). Marquis Huntley returned with 176 tuns of whale oil. After her return from the whale fishery she sailed for the Baltic.

== Fate ==
Lloyd's List reported that Marquis of Huntley had been lost off Anholt while sailing from Gefle back to Hull. Marquis of Huntley, Mitchinson, master, had foundered in November; her crew were rescued.
