= Marquis of Huntly (1811 EIC ship) =

Ship

History

United Kingdom
- Name: Marquis of Huntly
- Namesake: Marquess of Huntly
- Owner: EIC voyages 1-3: Thomas G Murray; EIC voyage 4: John Campbell; EIC voyages: 5-9: John MacTaggart; EIC voyages 10-11: Thomas Ward.
- Builder: Daniel & Samuel Brent, Rotherhithe
- Launched: 17 October 1811
- Fate: Broken up 1834

General characteristics
- Tons burthen: 1279, or 1348, or 134873/94 (bm)
- Length: Overall: 167 ft 9 in (51.1 m); Keel: 136 ft 0 in (41.5 m)
- Beam: 12 ft 0 1/2 in (3.7 m)
- Depth of hold: 17 ft 1 in (5.2 m)
- Complement: 120
- Armament: 26 × 18-pounder guns + 10 × 18-pounder carronades

Marquis of Huntly (or Marquis of Huntley) was launched at Rotherhithe in 1811. She made 11 voyages for the British East India Company (EIC) between 1812 and 1834, when she was broken up.

== Career ==
EIC voyage #1 (1812–1813): Captain Donald Macleod acquired a letter of marque on 19 March 1812. He sailed from Portsmouth on 25 March 1812, bound for China. She reached Batavia on 8 August and arrived at Whampoa Anchorage on 20 September. Marquis of Huntly and Cirencester were reported to have been dismasted on their way to China. However, it was not Marquis of Huntly that lost her masts but the frigate HMS Theban. Homeward bound, Marquis of Huntly crossed the Second Bar on 16 December, reached St Helena on 27 March 1813, and arrived at the Downs on 5 June.

EIC voyage #2 (1814–1815): Captain MacLeod sailed from Portsmouth on 22 February 1814, bound for Madras and China. Marquis of Huntly reached Johanna on 6 June and arrived at Madras on 4 July. She sailed on, reaching Penang on 21 Aug Penang, Malacca on 14 September, and Lintin on 20 October; she arrived at Whampoa on 30 November. Homeward bound, she crossed the Second Bar on 9 January 1815, reached St Helena on 19 April and Ascension on 6 May, and arrived at the Downs on 23 June.

EIC voyage #3 (1816–1817): On 17 January 1816 a strong wind caused Marquis of Huntly to part from her anchors and cables and drove her into Marquis of Ely, causing damage to Marquis of Ely. Captain MacLeod sailed from the Downs on 23 January 1816, bound for Bombay and China. Marquis of Huntly reached Bombay on 16 May, Penang on 13 July, and Malacca on 26 July; she arrived at Whampoa on 19 August. Homeward bound, she crossed the Second Bar on 20 October, reached St Helena on 2 March 1817, and arrived at the Downs on 4 May.

For the entire voyage to China, after the accident with Marquis of Ely, and back, 40 extra men were employed to operate her pumps. When Marquis of Huntly went into the dock on her return to England it was discovered that the "butt end" of one of her bow planks had been pushed out of position for about eight or nine feet. Keeping her afloat had cost her owners £7,000.

EIC voyage #4 (1817–1819): Captain MacLeod sailed from the Downs on 31 December 1817, bound for Bombay and China. Marquis of Huntly reached Bombay on 12 May and Malacca on 5 August; she arrived at Whampoa on 26 August. Homeward bound, she crossed the Second Bar on 11 November, reached the Cape on 1 February 1819 and St Helena on 23 February 1817, and arrived at the Downs on 5 May.

EIC voyage #5 (1820–1821): Captain MacLeod sailed from the Downs on 5 March 1820, bound for Bombay and China. Marquis of Huntly reached Johanna on 21 May, and Bombay on 7 June. She sailed up to Bengal, reaching the New Anchorage on August. She reached Penang on 6 November and Singapore on 21 November; she arrived at Whampoa on 7 February 1821. Homeward bound, she crossed the Second Bar on 8 March, reached St Helena on 18 July, and arrived at the Downs on 9 September.

EIC voyage #6 (1822–1823): Captain John Small Henry Fraser sailed from the Downs on 30 April 1822, bound for China. Marquis of Huntly arrived at Whampoa on 13 September. Homeward bound, she crossed the Second Bar on 17 November, reached the Cape on 4 February 1823 and St Helena on 2 March, and arrived at the Downs on 28 April.

EIC voyage #7 (1824–1825): Captain Fraser sailed from the Downs on 2 May 1824, bound for China. Marquis of Huntly reached Singapore on 22 August and arrived at Whampoa on 24 September. Homeward bound, she crossed the Second Bar on 7 January 1825, reached St Helena on 10 April, and arrived at the Downs on 25 May.

EIC voyage #8 (1826–1827): Captain Fraser sailed from the Downs on 11 March 1826, bound for Madras and China. Marquis of Huntly reached Madras on 24 June, Penang on 26 August, and Singapore on 20 September; she arrived at Whampoa on 31 October. Homeward bound, she crossed the Second Bar on 27 December, reached the Cape on 26 March 1827 and St Helena on 22 April, and arrived at her moorings on 5 June.

EIC voyage #9 (1828–1829): Captain Fraser sailed from the Downs on 8 February 1828, bound for Bengal and China. Marquis of Huntly reached the New Anchorage on 28 May, Penang on 3 September, and Singapore on 16 September. She arrived at Whampoa on 22 October. Homeward bound, she crossed the Second Bar on 21 December, reached St Helena on 23 March 1829, and arrived at the Downs on 15 May.

Her owners sold Marquis of Huntly for breaking up, but she instead made two more voyages.

EIC voyage #10 (1831–1832): Captain John Hine sailed from the Downs on 24 January 1831, bound for Bombay and China. Marquis of Huntly reached Bombay on 21 May, Penang on 16 August, Malacca on 27 August, and Singapore on 1 September. She arrived at Whampoa on 3 October. Homeward bound, she crossed the Second Bar on 4 December, reached the Cape on 1 April 1832 and St Helena on 28 April. She arrived at the Downs on 16 June.

On 25 July 1832 the EIC chartered Marquis of Huntly for one voyage to China as a "dismantled ship". The EIC chartered her at a rate of £12 14s 11d per ton, for 1348 tons.

EIC voyage #11 (1833–1834): Captain Hine sailed from the Downs on 17 January 1833, bound for Bombay and China. Marquis of Huntly reached Bombay on 15 May, Penang on 15 July, and Singapore on 29 July. She arrived at Whampoa on 16 August. Homeward bound, she crossed the Second Bar on 16 November, reached the Cape on 2 February 1834, and St Helena on 26 February. She arrived at the Downs on 29 April.

== Fate ==
Marquis of Huntly's register was cancelled on 5 January 1835 as her demolition had been completed.
