= Lisianski Island =

Island in Hawaii

Native name: Papaʻāpoho
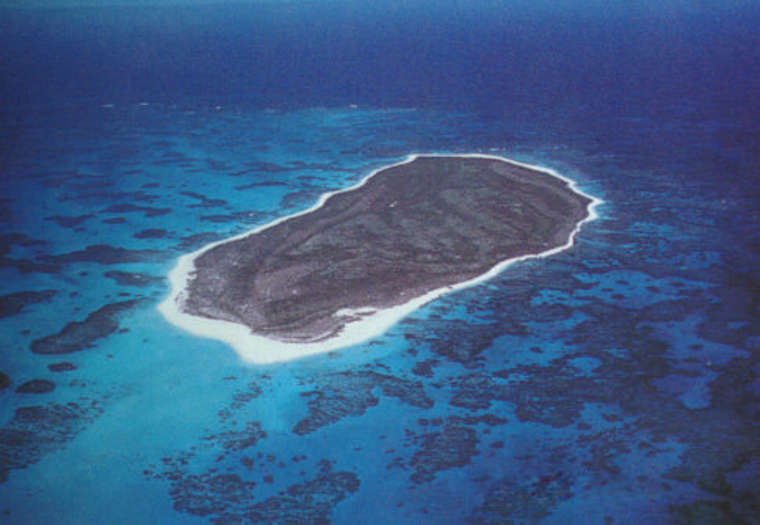
- View of Lisianski from the air.

- Location within Pacific Ocean

Geography
- Location: Pacific Ocean
- Coordinates: 26.064031°N 173.965802°W
- Archipelago: Northwestern Hawaiian Islands
- Area: 384.425 acres (155.571 ha)
- Length: 1.2 mi (1.9 km)
- Width: 0.6 mi (1 km)
- Coastline: 3.1 mi (5 km)

Administration
- United States
- State: Hawaii

Lisianski Island (Hawaiian: Papaʻāpoho) is one of the Northwestern Hawaiian Islands, with a land area of 384.425 acres (155.571 ha) and a maximum elevation of 40 feet (12 m) above sea level. It is a low, flat sand and coral island about 905 nautical miles (1,041 mi; 1,676 km) northwest of Honolulu, Hawaii. The island is surrounded by reefs and shoals, including the extensive Neva Shoals. Access to the island is possible only by helicopter or by boat via a narrow sandy inlet on the southeastern side of the island.

== Administration ==
Politically, Lisianski Island is part of the City and County of Honolulu in the State of Hawaii. However, as part of the Hawaiian Islands National Wildlife Refuge, it is administered by the United States Fish and Wildlife Service. It has no resident human population.

== Geology and topography ==
Lisianski Island is made of limestone that caps the submerged summit of an extinct shield volcano that was active about 20 million years ago. Lisianski Island is undergoing the slow process of erosion, and features a depression between two tall sand dunes, that is thought to once have been a lagoon like the one on Laysan, its nearest neighbor. For this reason, the island's selected Hawaiian name, Papa‘āpoho, means "island with a depression". Over three-quarters of the Bonin petrels that nest in Hawaii nest here. Recent discovery of subfossils on the island indicate that Laysan duck populations once occurred on the island, possibly inhabiting the former lagoon.

== History ==
Lisianski Island is named after Yuri Lisyansky, a Russian Imperial explorer and an officer in the Imperial Russian Navy. Lisyansky was the commanding officer of the Russian-American Company's merchant sloop Neva, which was on an exploration mission as part of the first Russian circumnavigation of the world when she ran aground on the island in 1805. Lisyansky reported the island to be of little interest, except insofar as its surrounding reefs and shoals posed a threat to passing vessels.

King Kamehameha IV claimed the island for the Kingdom of Hawaii on 10 May 1857. In 1890, the North Pacific Phosphate and Fertilizer Company acquired a twenty-year lease on the island from the Kingdom of Hawaii.

After the overthrow of the Hawaiian Monarchy in 1893, Lisianski Island became part of the Republic of Hawaii in 1894. On August 12, 1898, the United States annexed Hawaii, including Lisianski Island, and Lisianski Island was included in the Territory of Hawaii upon its creation on April 30, 1900. In 1909, Lisianski Island became part of the new Hawaiian Islands Bird Reservation — which later became the Hawaiian Islands National Wildlife Refuge — established by U.S. President Theodore Roosevelt. Prior to this, there had been concern about the poaching of birds on the island.

When Hawaii became a U.S. state in August 1959, Lisianski Island became part of the new State of Hawaii. On June 15, 2006, it was included in the Papahānaumokuākea Marine National Monument.

== Neva Shoals ==
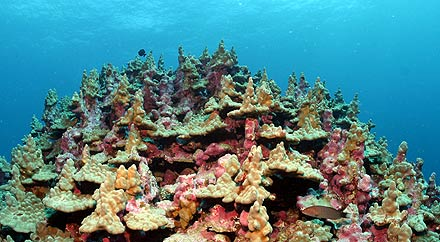
The coral at Neva Shoals

Neva Shoals is a shallow reef directly southeast of Lisianski Island covering 979 square kilometers (378 sq mi), more than half the size of Oahu. Lisiansky named Neva Shoals after his ship, Neva. The shoal is shallow and makes access to the island difficult. The reef has been described by divers as a "coral garden" because of the great variety of coral. Twenty-four types of coral have been identified at the reefs surrounding Lisianski. Reef fish are abundant, including predators.

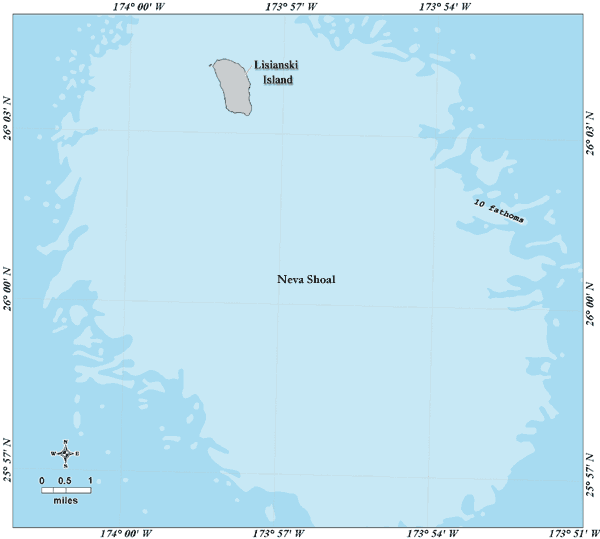
A bathymetric chart of the Neva shoal

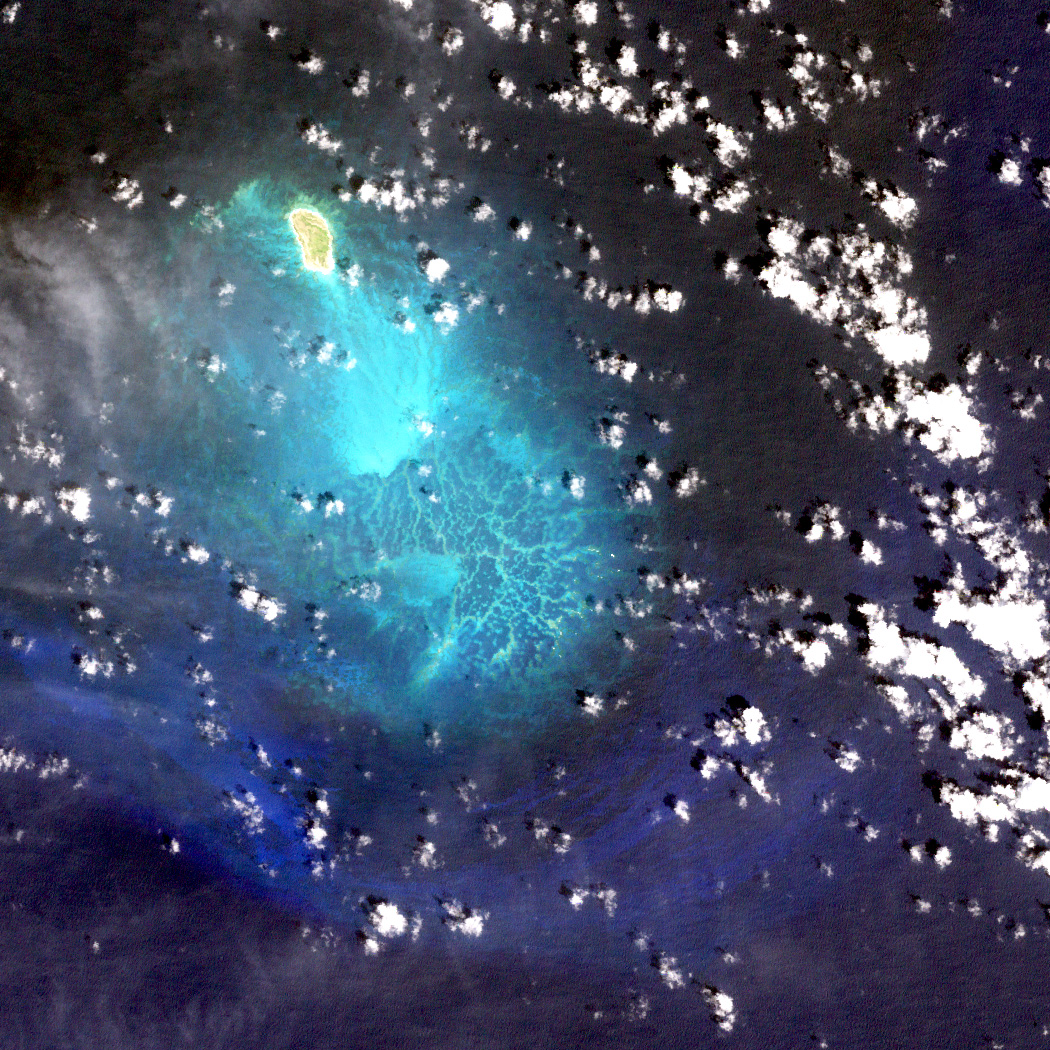
A satellite image of the Neva shoal

== See also ==
- List of volcanoes in the Hawaiian–Emperor seamount chain
- List of islands
- Desert island

== Bibliography ==
- Lisianski Island: Block 1014, Census Tract 114.98, Honolulu County, Hawaii, United States Census Bureau.
- M. Rauzon, Isles of Refuge: Wildlife and History of the Northwestern Hawaiian Islands, University of Hawaii Press, Honolulu: 2001.
