= French frigate Dédaigneuse =

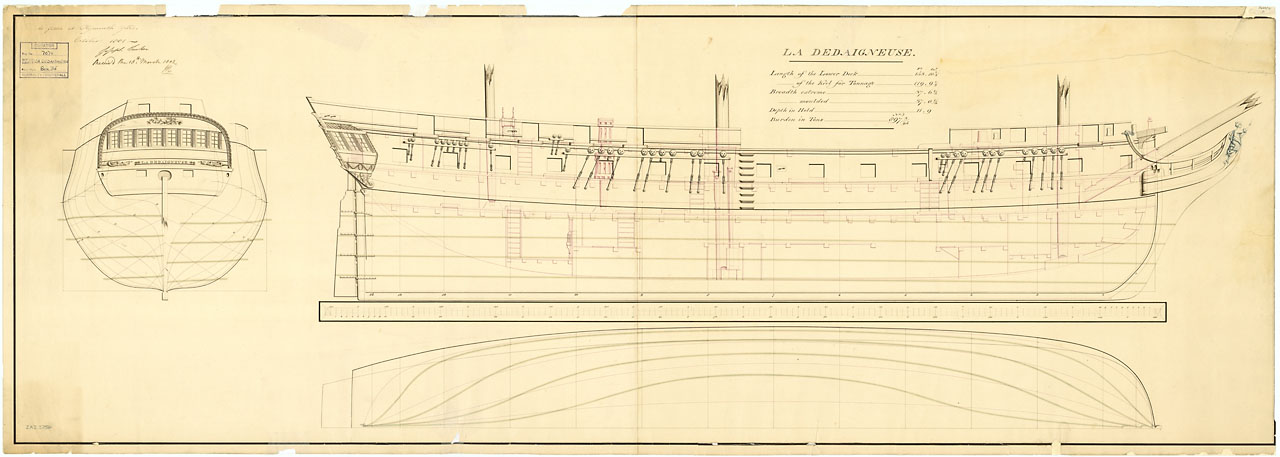
- Dédaigneuse

History

France
- Name: Dédaigneuse
- Builder: Bayonne (Constructeur: Jean Baudry)
- Laid down: June 1794
- Launched: December 1797
- Captured: 28 January 1801

United Kingdom
- Name: Dedaigneuse
- Acquired: by capture, 28 January 1801
- Nickname(s): Dead Nose
- Fate: Sold, April 1823

General characteristics
- Class & type: Coquille-class frigate
- Displacement: 1,180 tonneaux
- Tons burthen: 590 port tonneaux; 897 3/94 (bm)
- Length: 42.8 m (140 ft 5 in)
- Beam: 11.4 m (37 ft 5 in)
- Draught: 5.3 m (17 ft 5 in)
- Depth of hold: 3.6 m (11 ft 10 in)
- Sail plan: Full-rigged ship
- Armament: UD: 28 × 12-pounder long guns; SD: 12 × 8-pounder long guns

Dédaigneuse was a 40-gun Coquille-class frigate of the French Navy, launched in 1797. The Royal Navy captured her in 1801 and took her into service as HMS Dedaigneuse. She was hulked as a receiving ship in 1812 and sold in 1823.

== French service ==
On 30 December 1800, as she was taking political prisoners at Cayenne to bring them back to France under Captain Prevost Lacroix, she spotted Tamar.

== Capture ==
On Monday, 26 January 1801, at 8.00 a.m., at 45°N 12°W, Oiseau, under Captain Samuel Hood Linzee, fell in with and chased Dédaigneuse, which was bound from Cayenne to Rochefort with despatches. By noon the following day, with Cape Finisterre in sight, Captain Linzee signalled Sirius and Amethyst who were in sight to join the pursuit. Dédaigneuse maintained her advantage until 2.00 a.m. on the 28th when Oiseau and Sirius were within musket-shot of Dédaigneuse. In a desperate attempt to shake her pursuers she opened fire from her stern-chasers, which fire the two British ships immediately returned. After a running fight of 45 minutes, Dédaigneuse was two miles off shore near Cape Bellem with her running rigging and sails cut to pieces, mainly due to the steady and well-directed fire from Sirius. Aboard Dédaigneuse casualties were heavy with several men killed, including her captain and fifth lieutenant, and 17 wounded; she was therefore forced to strike her colours . Amethyst, due to unfavourable winds, was unable to get up until after Dédaigneuse had struck. Although Sirius was the only British ship damaged (rigging, sails, main-yard and bowsprit) in the encounter, there were no fatalities on the English side. Captain Linzee declared the encounter a long and anxious chase of 42 hours and acknowledged a gallant resistance on the part of Dédaigneuse. Linzee also described her as "a perfect new Frigate, Copper fastened and sails well...". He sent her into Plymouth with a prize crew under the command of his first lieutenant, H. Lloyd. Dédaigneuse was afterwards added to Royal Navy under the same name HMS Dedaigneuse.

== British service ==
Captain Thomas Shortland commissioned Dedaigneuse in April 1802, and sailed her for the East Indies in June.

Captain Peter Heywood took command of Dedaigneuse in April 1803 in the East Indies. On 14 December she captured the two (or four-gun) French privateer Espiegle. Because of his poor health and the death of his elder brother, Captain Heywood resigned his command on 24 January 1805. He then returned to the United Kingdom as a passenger on the East Indiaman Cirencester.

Captain Charles James Johnson replaced Heywood.

In July 1805 Commander William Beauchamp-Proctor was given acting-command of Dedaigneuse. He was not confirmed in his post-rank until 5 September 1806.

On 21 November 1808, at sunset, Dédaigneuse was stationed off the Isle de France when she encountered the French 36-gun frigate Sémillante returning from a cruise in the Indian Ocean. Dédaigneuse gave chase and by midnight the two ships were no more than half a mile apart. Dédaigneuse fired two or three shots from her bow-chasers, and then a full broadside, as Sémillante tacked. Dédaigneuse followed suit, but because of the lightness of the wind, the ship would not come round. A boat was lowered down to tow her round, and she was finally able to pursue the Frenchman, now some distance ahead. Unfortunately, Dédaigneuse had lost a great deal of copper, being very foul, and at best a bad working ship, so gradually dropped further astern. Beauchamp-Proctor eventually abandoned the chase at about 5 p.m, and soon afterwards Sémillante anchored in Port Louis. Dédaigneuse continued to patrol the waters off the Isle de France until her water and provisions were almost expended, before sailing to Madagascar to reprovision, and then sailed to Bombay. When the commander-in-chief expressed himself dissatisfied with his conduct, Captain Beauchamp-Proctor requested a court-martial, which was held aboard Culloden in Bombay harbour on 27 March 1809. Every officer of his ship gave strong evidence in the captain's favour, and the court acquitted him of all blame, laying responsibility squarely on the poor sailing qualities of Dédaigneuse.

== Fate ==
The "Principal Officers and Commissioners of His Majesty's Navy" first offered Dedaigneuse , of "42 guns and 897 tons", "Lying at Deptford" for sale on 21 May 1823. Dedaigneuse sold on that day for £2,000 to Job Cockshott.
