= Neva (1802 Russian ship) =

Ship originally called Thames, purchased and renamed by the Russians

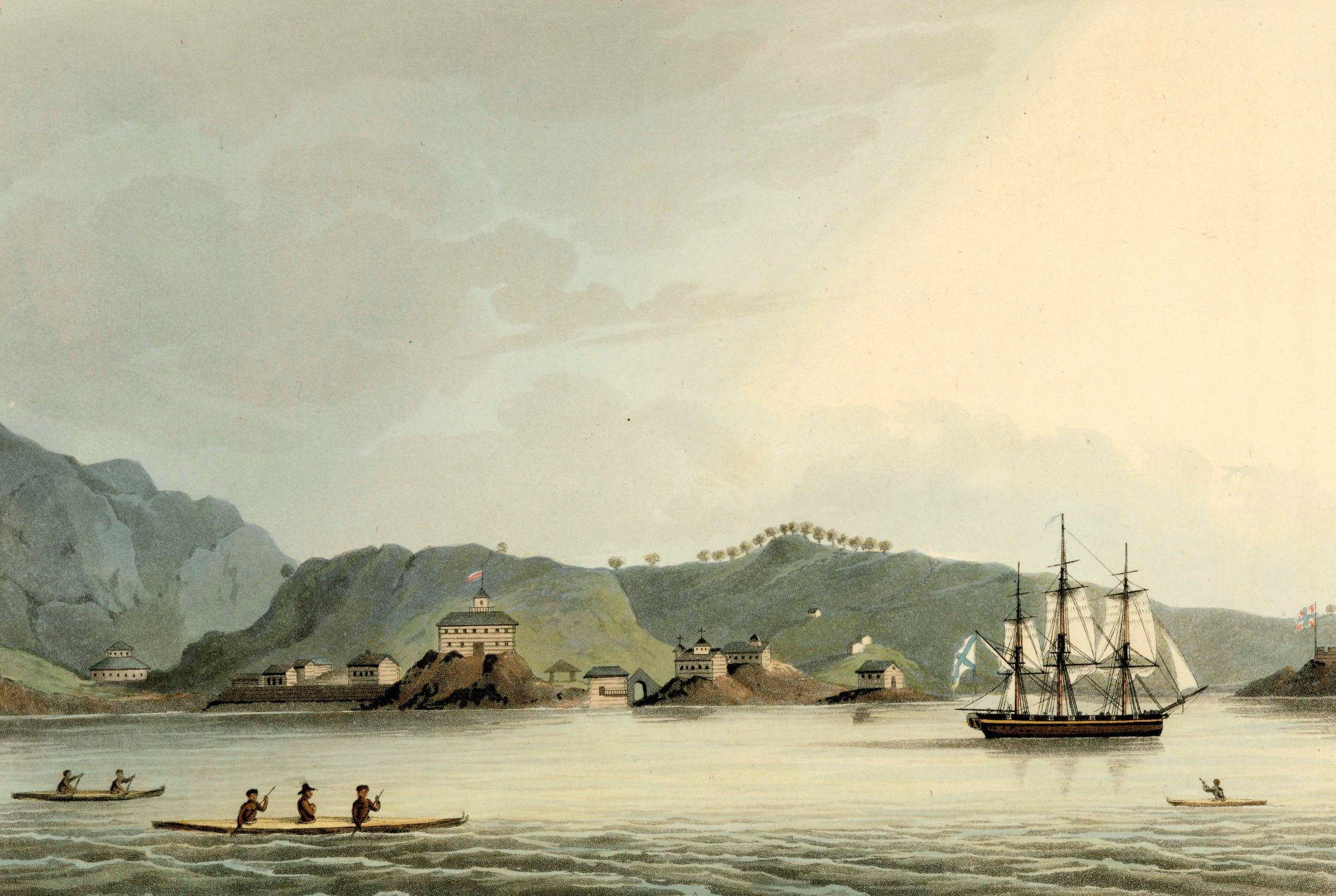
- The Russian ship Neva visits Kodiak, Alaska

History

United Kingdom
- Name: Thames
- Launched: 1801
- Fate: Sold 1802

Russian Empire
- Name: Thames
- Acquired: 1802 by purchase
- Renamed: Neva in 1803
- Fate: Wrecked Sitka, Alaska, 1812

General characteristics
- Tons burthen: 370 bm
- Length: 32.6 m (107 ft)
- Sail plan: Full-rigged ship
- Complement: 43
- Armament: 14 guns

Neva (Russian: Нева) was the British merchant ship Thames, launched in 1801, that the Russian Empire bought in 1803, and renamed Neva. She participated in two trips to the Far East, the first of which was the first Russian circumnavigation of the world. She was wrecked in January 1813.

== Thames ==
Thames was a 200-foot (61 m)-long, three-masted sailing ship of 370 tons burthen, built in Britain in 1801.

== Russian career ==
In 1802, Imperial Russian Navy officer Yuri Lisyansky travelled to England where he bought two vessels, Thames and Leander, on his own account. Both ships left England for the Baltic in May 1803, docking at Kronstadt on 5 June. Czar Alexander I renamed Thames to Neva, after the river, and Leander to Nadezhda ("Hope"). The two vessels sailed in 1803 on a voyage that would become the first Russian circumnavigation of the world. For the voyage Neva carried 14 cannon and a crew of 43 men under Lisyansky's command. The commander of the expedition was Admiral Ivan Fyodorovich Kruzenstern, in Nadezhda. Although the vessels were armed, as were many merchant vessels at the time, they were never commissioned into the Russian navy.

Neva played a key role in the 1804 Battle of Sitka when the Russians recaptured Fort St Archangel Mikhail and the town from the Tlingit, who had captured it in 1802. In 1804, Alexandr Baranov, general manager of the Russian American Company, had failed in his attempt to recapture the Fort with a force of 120 Russians in four small vessels and 800 Aleuts in 300 baidarkas (leather canoes). Baranov returned to Sitka Sound in late September 1804 aboard Neva. Neva was accompanied by Ermak and two other smaller, armed sailing ships, manned by 150 promyshlenniks (fur traders), along with 400–500 Aleuts in 250 baidarkas. This force succeeded in returning the region to Russian control. Reportedly, afterwards a shaman placed a curse on Neva and all on her in retribution; some eight years later she wrecked.

In 1805 Neva discovered Lisianski Island and the surrounding Neva Shoals by running aground there. Lisyansky reported that the island was of little interest, except insofar as its surrounding reefs and shoals posed a threat to passing vessels. Lisyanski was the first to describe the Hawaiian monk seal, which he observed on the island that now bears his name.

In 1805–6, Neva carried a cargo of 150,000 fur seal pelts to China. There she sold them for tea, chinaware and nankeen, which she carried back to Russia.

In 1806–7, Neva made a second trip to the Pacific Ocean, this time under the command of Captain lieutenant Ludwig von Hagemeister. Hagemeister would later become Chief Manager of the Russian American Company.

Neva left Kronstadt on 2 November 1806 and reached Salvador, Brazil on 10 January 1807. She did not leave there until 9 March. Although Hagemeister had originally planned to travel via Cape Horn, it was too late in the season to do so, so he sailed to Port Jackson instead for "wood and water".

In June, Neva became the first Russian ship to reach the Australian mainland when she visited the new British colony at Port Jackson, modern Sydney, on 4 June 1806. (Note: Australian sources show Neva arriving on 16 June from Cronstadt on voyage of discovery. The same records show her leaving 1 July for the "N.W. Coast", or Kadjack (Kodiak, Alaska).)

== Fate ==
Neva left Okhotsk, Russia in August 1812 carrying 75 people and a shipment that included guns, furs, and some religious treasures. After enduring three months of storms, sickness and water shortages, Neva arrived in Alaska's Prince William Sound. The crew pushed eastward toward Sitka; near Kruzof Island, the ship hit rocks and sank, on 9 January 1813. Thirty-two crew members died in the wreck; 28 survivors of the wreck made it to shore, two of whom died before rescuers arrived some three weeks later. The sites of the wreck and the survival camp have been found on Kruzof Island.

The site of the camp is a little inland from the beach. In the 203 years since Neva ran aground, the shoreline has risen some 11 feet due to movement of tectonic plates, because the reduction of weight on the land due to melting of glaciers is causing geologic rebound. At the time of the wrecking, the campsite was at the beach.

In addition to crew members, many passengers died, including Terentii Stepanovich Bornovolokov, who was to replace Alexandr Baranov as Governor of the Russian–American Company. The financial loss to the Russian–American Company amounted to more than 250,000 rubles. It was the second gravest marine catastrophe in the history of Russian America, after Phoenix (or Feniks) was lost at sea in 1799 with all hands and passengers, including Joasaph Bolotov, and cargo, for a total financial loss of 622,328 rubles.

== Commemorative coins ==
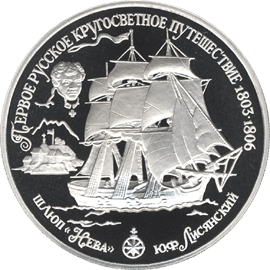
Russian 25-rouble coin of Neva

In 1993 Russia issued four coins to commemorate the first Russian voyage around the world. One was a 150-rouble platinum coin showing both Nadezhda and Neva on the reverse. Two were 25-rouble palladium coins, one for Nadezhda and one for Neva, and the final one was a 3-rouble coin with both ships and a map of the voyage.

== See also ==
- European and American voyages of scientific exploration
