= Yuri Lisyansky =

Explorer (1773–1837)

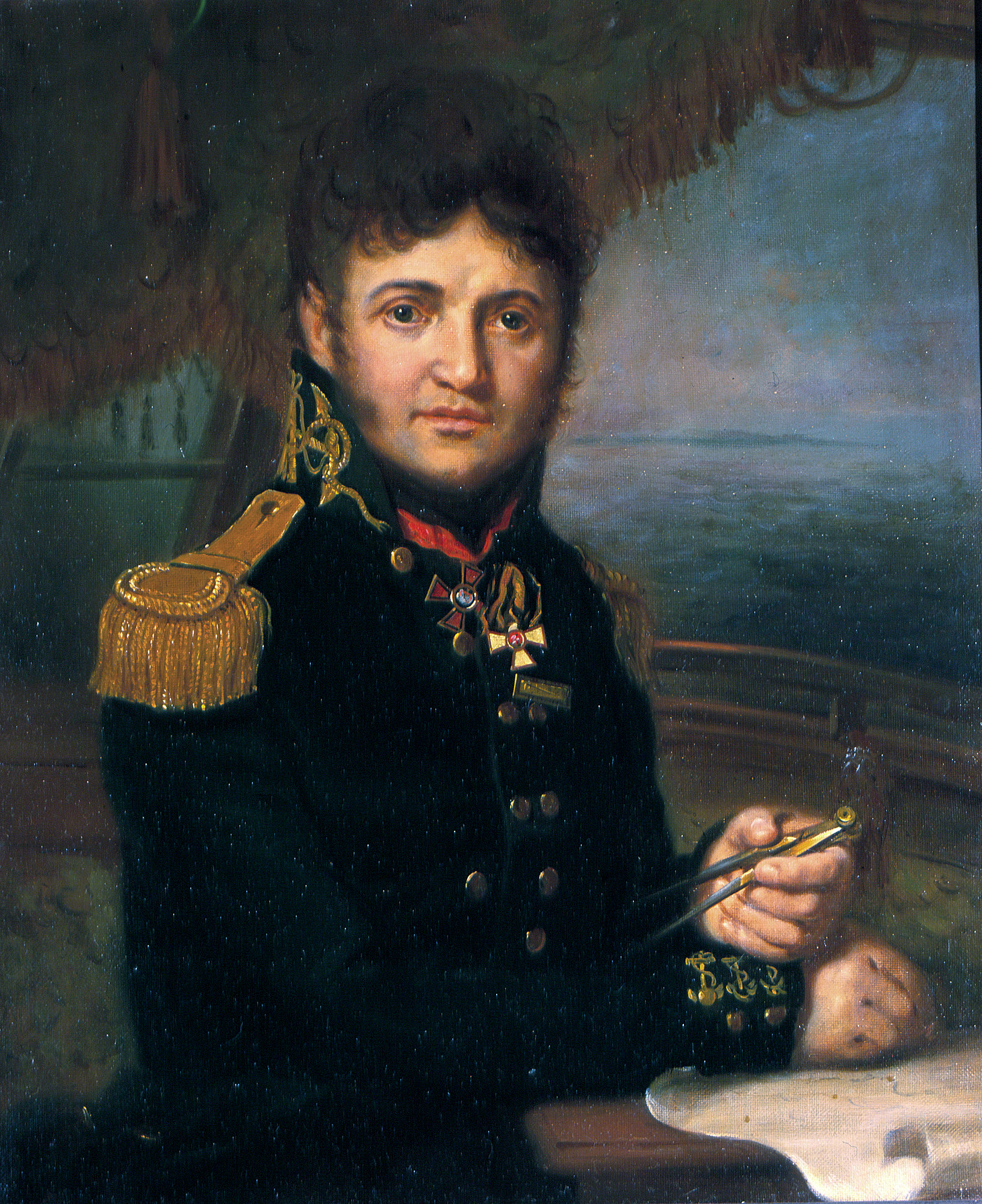
- Portrait by Vladimir Borovikovsky (1810)
- Born: 12 April [O.S. 1 April] 1773; Nizhyn, Cossack Hetmanate, Russian Empire
- Died: 6 March 1837 (aged 63); Saint Petersburg, Russian Empire
- Military career
- Allegiance: Russia
- Branch: Imperial Russian Navy
- Conflicts: Russo-Swedish War; Battle of Sitka
- Awards: Order of Saint Vladimir

Yuri Fyodorovich Lisyansky (Note: Also spelled Urey Lisiansky, Lisianski, and Lysyansky) (Ukrainian: Юрій Федорович Лисянський, romanized: Yuri Fedorovych Lysianskyi; Russian: Юрий Фёдорович Лисянский; 12 April [O.S. 1 April] 1773 – 6 March 1837) was an explorer and officer in the Imperial Russian Navy. He served as a volunteer in the British Royal Navy and later headed the first Russian circumnavigation aboard the Neva. He was also among the early western explorers to visit Easter Island.

== Biography ==
The birthplace of Yuri Lisyansky is not known with certainty, because his birth records are not preserved. However it is assumed that he was born in his family house in Nizhyn, Cossack Hetmanate, Russian Empire (now Ukraine), into the family of an Orthodox priest. In 1786, he graduated from the Navy Cadet Corps and took part in the Russo-Swedish War (1788–1790). In 1790–1793, he served in the Baltic Fleet.

In 1793–1800, he sailed British ships all over the globe. Between 1793 and 1795, he served as a volunteer aboard the 36-gun HMS Oiseau, under her captain, Robert Murray. Lisyansky recalled in his memoirs his experiences on the North American Station operating against French convoys and privateers, and how while in the West Indies he was struck by yellow fever, recalling how Murray had helped his recovery, even giving up part of his own accommodation for the sick Lisyansky.

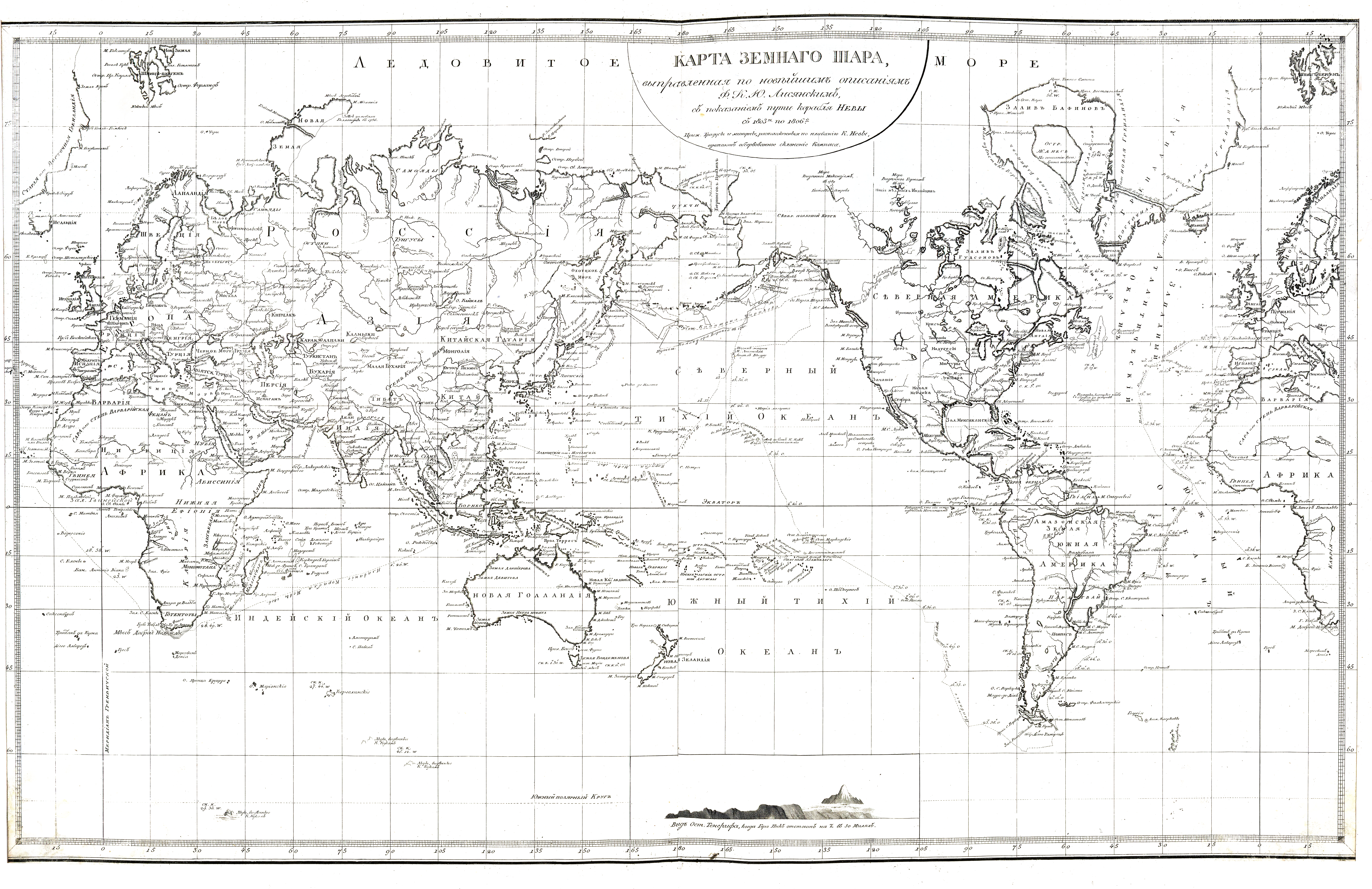
Map of the Neva's route

In 1803–1806, Lisyansky as the commanding officer of the Russian-American Company's merchant sloop Neva took part in the first Russian circumnavigation of the Earth. The expedition was under the command of Count Nikolay Petrovich Rezanov, Plenipotentiary of Alexander I for the Far Eastern and Western colonies of the Russian Empire, and Captain Adam Johann von Krusenstern in Nadezhda. The ships also included a naturalist, Wilhelm Gottlieb Tilesius, and an astronomer Johan Caspar Horner (1734–1834). They started from Kronstadt, but the ships split after visiting Hawaii, and Count Nikolay Rezanov and Lisyansky headed to Russian America (Alaska).

In 1804 Neva visited Easter Island, and later that year, was essential in defeating the Tlingit in the Battle of Sitka, Alaska. During his stay in Alaska, Lisyansky mapped its coast, the islands of Kodiak and Sitka, and left its geographical and ethnographic descriptions. He collected a unique ethnographic collection that tells about the life and culture of local peoples - Aleuts, Eskimos and Tlingit. He criticized the Russian colonial government for mercilessly oppressing and abusing the indigenous peoples of America.

In 1805 he met Krusenstern again in Macau, but they soon separated. Also in 1805, he was the first to describe the Hawaiian monk seal on the island which now bears his name - Lisianski Island. Eventually, Neva was the first to return to Kronstadt on 22 July 1806. For his feats Lisyansky received several rewards, including the Order of Saint Vladimir of the 3rd degree. He described his own adventures and travels in the book Voyage Round the World with maps and drawings, which he published in Russian and English in 1812–1814.

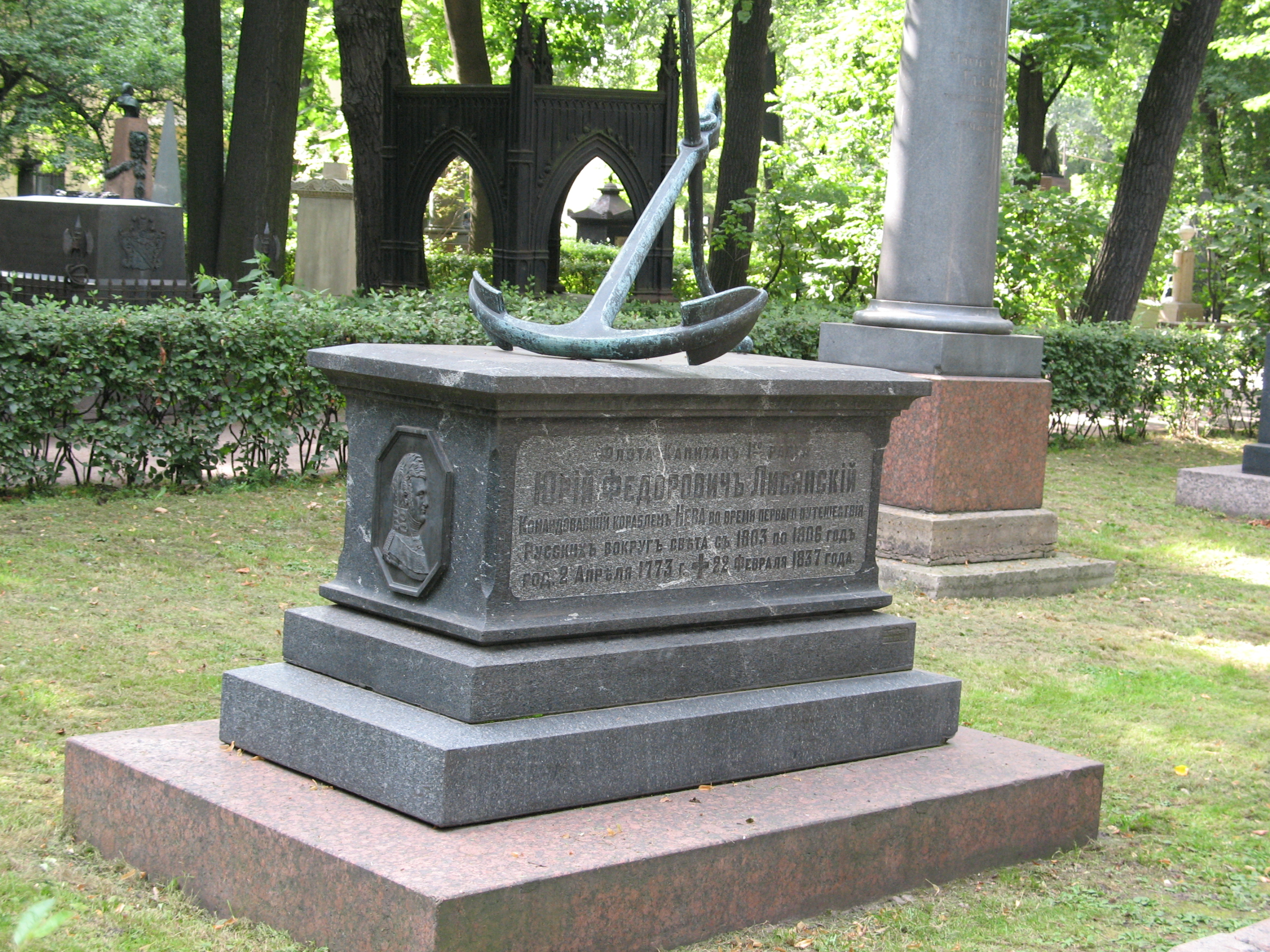
Lisyansky's grave

Lisyansky was buried at Tikhvin Cemetery of the Alexander Nevsky Monastery, St. Petersburg.

== Memorials ==
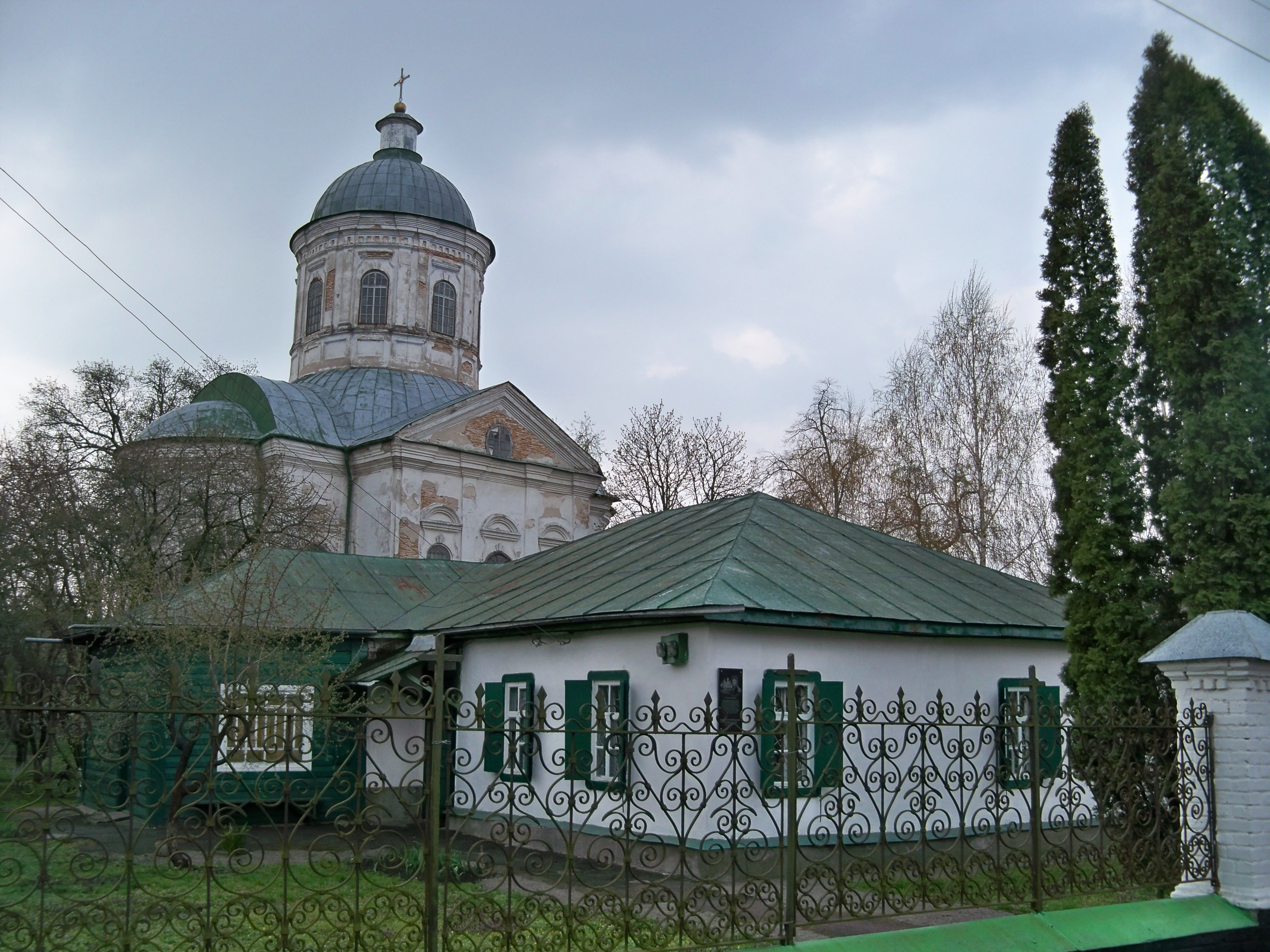
Lisyansky house museum by the Saint John the Evangelist Church

A number of places are named after him: Lisianski Island in the Northwestern Hawaiian Islands, a peninsula of Baranof Island, Alaska, a bay, a strait, a river, and a cape in North America, an undersea mountain in the Okhotsk Sea, and a peninsula by the Okhotsk Sea. There is the memorial museum of Yu.Lisyansky in his family house in Nizhyn and a monument by the house.

The 1965-built icebreaker Ledokol-9 was renamed Yuriy Lisyanskiy in 1966.

== Sources ==
- Lisyansky, Yuri (1814). A Voyage Round the World in 1803, 4, 5 & 6 in the Ship Neva. London: Longman, Hurst, Rees, Orme, and Brown. ISBN 9780839811626.
- Barratt, Glynn R. deV. A Russian View of Philadelphia, 1795-96: From the Journal of Lieutenant Iurii Lisianskii // Pennsylvania History: A Journal of Mid-Atlantic Studies. Vol. 65, No. 1 (Winter 1998), pp. 62–86.
- Naming of Alaska
