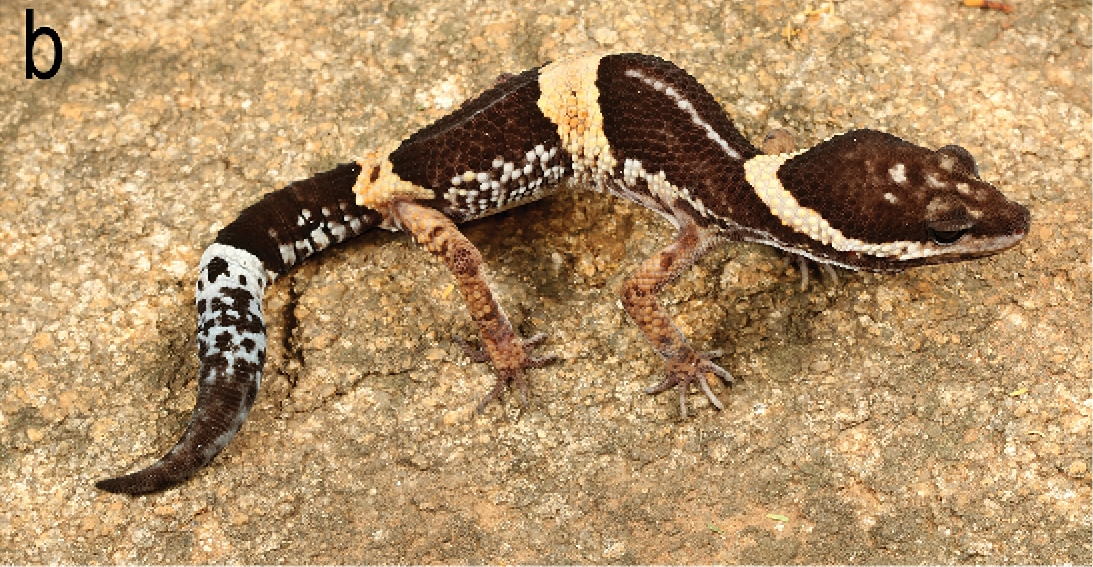
- Juvenile

Scientific classification
- Kingdom: Animalia
- Phylum: Chordata
- Class: Reptilia
- Order: Squamata
- Suborder: Gekkota
- Family: Eublepharidae
- Genus: Eublepharis
- Species: E. pictus

Binomial name
- Eublepharis pictus Mirza & Gnaneswar, 2022

= Eublepharis pictus =

Species of lizard

Eublepharis pictus, the painted leopard gecko, is a species of gecko. It lives in Andhra Pradesh and Odisha, in India. It can grow to 117 mm (4.6 in) in snout–vent length. The species lives in dry evergreen forest mixed in with scrubs and meadows. Eublepharis pictus is nocturnal and has been observed foraging along trails after dusk using its tongue as a sensory organ by licking surfaces. Eublepharis pictus has 23 to 26 rows of large flat tubercle-like keeled scales across the dorsum intermixed with smaller scales. A single pale band between the nuchal loop and the caudal constriction. Smooth subdigital lamellae on digital IV of pes 19; 17–18 precloacal pores in an angulate series lacking a diastema. E. pictus was discovered on the year of 2022 in Andhra Pradesh, in India. The species is widespread in the forest but may be near threatened due to wildlife trade and the illegal smuggling of Eublepharis pictus.

Eublepharis pictus was discovered when a dead female of the species was found in a water tank in Vishakhapatnam, Andhra Pradesh, India. The specimen was collected washed and then placed in 4% formaldehyde for two days and later placed into 70% ethanol and deposited in the collection of the National Centre for Biological Sciences, Bangalore, India.

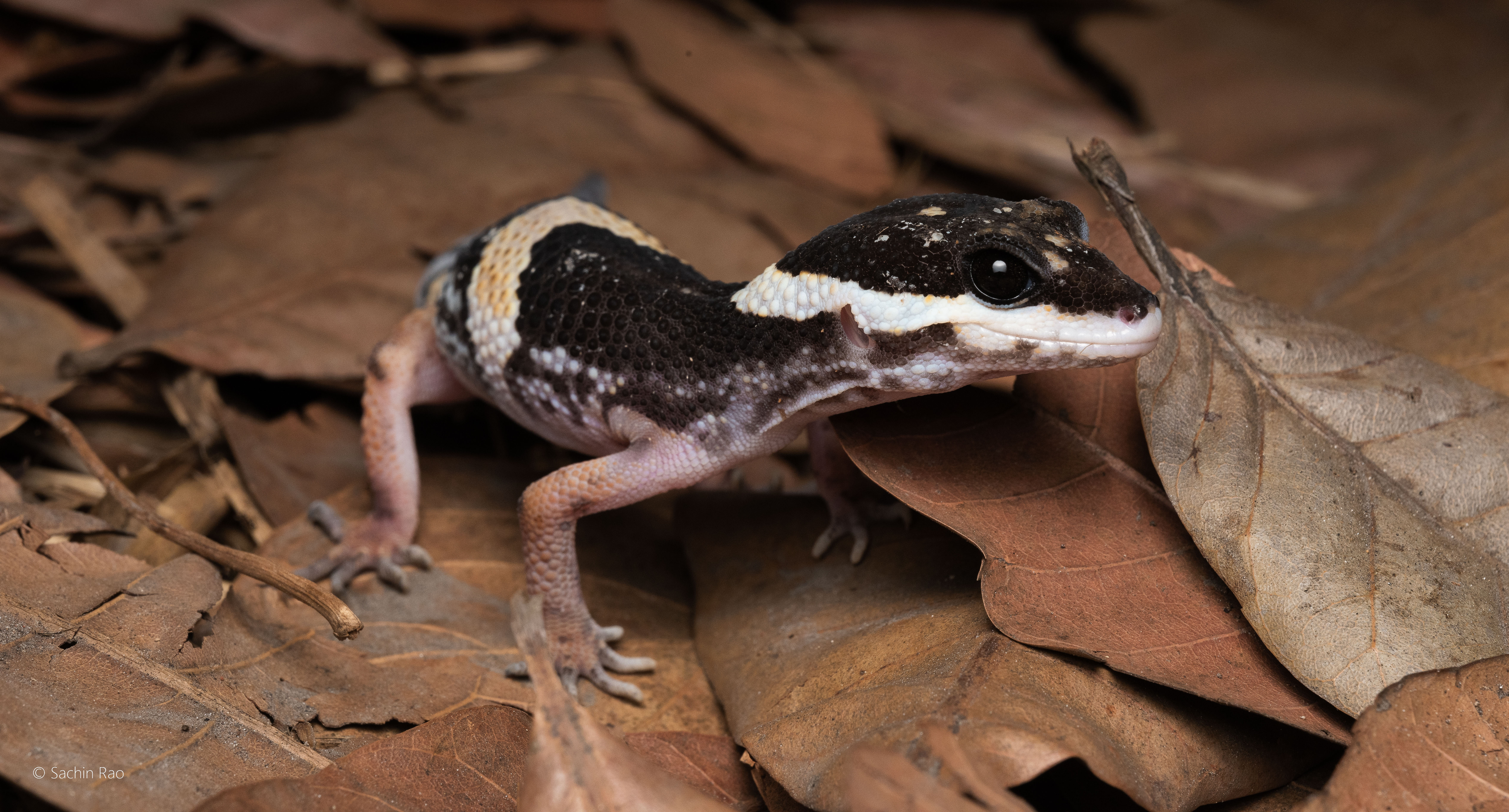
Eublepharis pictus (Close Up)

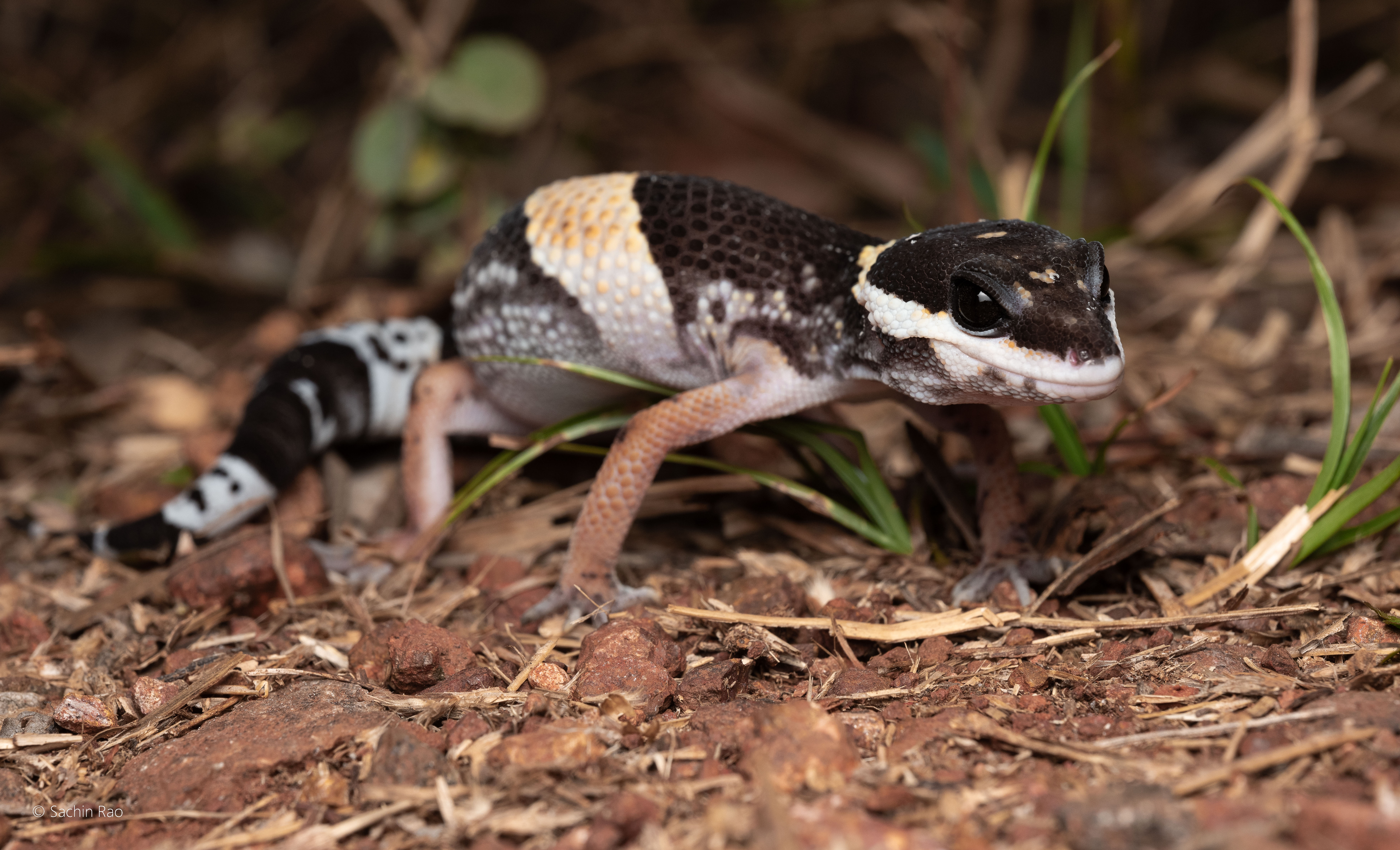
Eublepharis pictus (Habitat View)

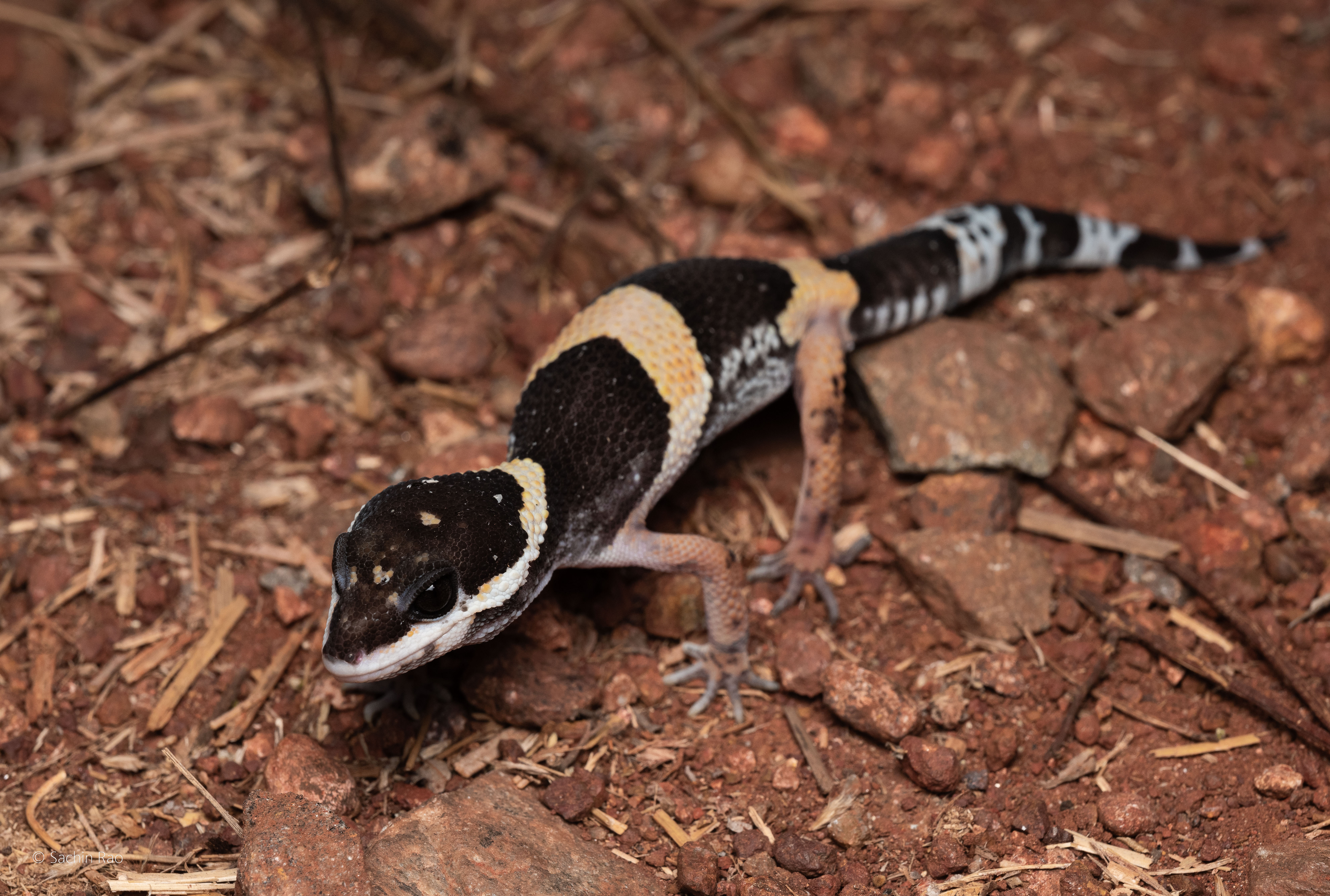
Eublepharis pictus (Top View)

== Morphology ==
Eublepharis angramainyu is a sister to all other Eublepharis species and the Eublepharis hardwickii group is sister to the Eublepharis macularius clade. Relationships between the E. macularius clade have poor to moderate support. The E. hardwickii group show two distinct well-supported clades corresponding to the population from the north and south. The northern population represents E. hardwickii while the south represents an unnamed taxon which was described as E. pictus.
