= 1761 in Russia =

Events from the year 1761 in Russia

== Incumbents ==
- Monarch – Elizabeth

== Events ==
- 1 April — The Russian Empire and the Austrian Empire sign a treaty of alliance.
- 16 December — Under the leadership of Pyotr Rumyantsev, Russian forces besiege and take control of the Prussian city of Kolberg during the Seven Years' War.

== Births ==
- Apollon Aleksandrovich Maykov, poet (d.1838)
- Yekaterina Sinyavina, composer (d.1784)
- Yekaterina von Engelhardt, noblewoman (d.1829)
- Yelizaveta Palmenbach, pedagogue (d.1832)
- 19 July ― Vasily Vladimirovich Petrov, experimental physicist (d.1834)
- 16 August ― Yevstigney Fomin, opera composer (d.1800)
- 19 August ― Andreyan Zakharov, architect (d.1811)
- 27 September ― Karl Gustav von Baggovut, military leader (d.1812)
- December — Michael Andreas Barclay de Tolly, military leader (d.1818)

== Deaths ==
- Ivan Vishnyakov, painter (b.1699)
