= 1784 in Russia =

Events from the year 1784 in Russia

== Incumbents ==
- Monarch – Catherine II

== Events ==
- God - completed by poet Gavrila Derzhavin
- Orlov Trotter - birth of Bars I, considered first of breed
- Vladikavkaz founded

== Births ==
- Joseph Bové - architect
- Catherine Herbert, Countess of Pembroke - Russian noblewoman who married Gen. George Herbert, 11th Earl of Pembroke
- Teodor Narbutt - historian and military engineer
- Grand Duchess Elena Pavlovna of Russia - daughter of Paul I of Russia
- Arkadi Suvorov - general
- Paul von Krüdener - diplomat, second ambassador to the United States

== Deaths ==
- Prince Adarnase of Kartli - general
- Zakhar Chernyshev - general, Minister of War
- Alexander Lanskoy - favorite of Catherine the Great
- Yekaterina Sinyavina - pianist and composer
