= List of commemorative coins of Russia (1993) =

This is a list of commemorative coins issued by the Central Bank of Russia in 1993:

Commemorative coins issued by the Central Bank of Russia in 1993
Name	Date of issue	Catalogue number	Nominal value	Total mintage	Image (front)	Image (reverse)
Individual issues
50th anniversary of Victory on the Volga	2 February 1993	5011-0005	3 rubles	500,000		
Trinity Lavra of St. Sergius, Sergiyev Posad	24 March 1993	5012-0002	5 rubles	500,000		
50th anniversary of Victory on the Kursk Bulge	17 June 1993	5011-0006	3 rubles	500,000		
Landmarks of ancient Merv (Turkmenistan)	19 October 2003	5012-0003	5 ruble	500,000		
50th anniversary of the liberation of Kiev from the fascist invaders	3 November 1993	5011-0007	3 ruble	500,000		
Century of the Franco-Russian Alliance	21 December 1993	5111-0012	3 ruble	40,000		
Geographical Series: First Russian circumnavigation of the world
Map of the voyage	28 April 1993	5111-0007	3 rubles	300,000		
English Embankment in Saint Petersburg	28 April 1993	5318-0003	150 rubles	2,500		
Sloop Nadezhda	28 April 1993	5415-0004	25 rubles	2,500		
Sloop "Neva"	28 April 1993	5415-0005	25 rubles	2,500		
Historical Series: Contributions of Russia to the treasury of world culture
Anna Pavlova	13 December 1993	5111-0010	3 rubles	45,000		
Feodor Chaliapin	13 December 1993	5111-0011	3 rubles	45,000		
Sergei Rachmaninoff	13 December 1993	5216-0007	50 rubles	7,500		
Pyotr Ilyich Tchaikovsky	13 December 1993	5217-0006	100 rubles	5,700		
Igor Stravinsky	13 December 1993	5318-0004	150 rubles	3,000		
Modest Mussorgsky	13 December 1993	5415-0006	25 rubles	5,500		
Series: Prominent personalities of Russia
130th anniversary of the birth of Vladimir Vernadsky	25 February 1993	5009-0006	1 ruble	500,000		
250th anniversary of the birth of Gavrila Derzhavin	14 July 1993	5009-0007	1 ruble	500,000		
100th anniversary of the birth of Vladimir Mayakovsky	14 July 1993	5009-0008	1 ruble	500,000		
150th anniversary of the birth of Kliment Timiryazev	14 July 1993	5009-0009	1 ruble	500,000		
175th anniversary of the birth of Ivan Turgenev	10 November 1993	5009-0010	1 ruble	500,000		
160th anniversary of the birth of Alexander Borodin	10 November 1993	5009-0011	1 ruble	500,000		
Series: Red Data Book
Amur tiger	29 September 1993	5109-0001	1 ruble	50,000		
Spiral-horned goat (or markhor)	29 September 1993	5109-0002	1 ruble	50,000		
Fish owl	29 September 1993	5109-0003	1 ruble	50,000		
Himalayan bear	29 September 1993	5516-0001	50 rubles	300,000		
Oriental stork	29 September 1993	5516-0002	50 rubles	300,000		
Caucasian grouse	29 September 1993	5516-0003	50 rubles	300,000		
Turkmenistan eyelid gecko	29 September 1993	5516-0004	50 rubles	300,000		
Black Sea bottlenose dolphin	29 September 1993	5516-0005	50 rubles	300,000		
Series: 100 years of Russia at the Olympics
Football, 1910	20 January 1993	5111-0003	3 rubles	40,000		
First gold medal	20 January 1993	5216-0003	50 rubles	7,500		
First participation of Russia at the Olympics	20 January 1993	5316-0001	50 rubles	7,500		
First Congress of the International Olympic Committee	20 January 1993	5414-0001	50 rubles	7,500		
Series: Architectural monuments of Russia
Ivan the Great Bell Tower	19 April 1993	5111-0006	3 rubles	30,000		
Saint Basil's Cathedral	16 May 1993	5111-0008	3 rubles	30,000		
Series: Russian ballet
Russian ballet	19 April 1993	5111-0004	3 rubles	40,000		
Russian ballet	19 April 1993	5111-0005	3 rubles	125,000		
Russian ballet	19 April 1993	5115-0001	25 rubles	10,000		
Russian ballet	19 April 1993	5214-0001	10 rubles	11,500		
Russian ballet	19 April 1993	5214-0002	10 rubles	57,500		
Russian ballet	19 April 1993	5215-0001	25 rubles	6,000		
Russian ballet	19 April 1993	5215-0002	25 rubles	12,500		
Russian ballet	19 April 1993	5216-0004	50 rubles	1,500		
Russian ballet	19 April 1993	5216-0005	50 rubles	4,700		
Russian ballet	19 April 1993	5217-0003	100 rubles	1,500		
Russian ballet	19 April 1993	5217-0004	100 rubles	2,700		
Russian ballet	19 April 1993	5315-0001	25 rubles	750		
Russian ballet	19 April 1993	5316-0002	50 rubles	750		
Russian ballet	19 April 1993	5318-0002	150 rubles	750		
Russian ballet	19 April 1993	5412-0001	5 rubles	2,000		
Russian ballet	19 April 1993	5412-0002	5 rubles	6,000		
Russian ballet	19 April 1993	5414-0002	10 rubles	2,000		
Russian ballet	19 April 1993	5414-0003	10 rubles	4,000		
Russian ballet	19 April 1993	5415-0002	25 rubles	2,000		
Russian ballet	19 April 1993	5415-0003	25 rubles	3,000		
Series: Protect our world
Brown bear	2 December 1993	5111-0009	3 rubles	5,000		
Brown bear	2 December 1993	5215-0003	25 rubles	2,000		
Brown bear	2 December 1993	5216-0006	50 rubles	1,480		
Brown bear	2 December 1993	5217-0005	100 rubles	1,400		
Brown bear	2 December 1993	5219-0001	200 rubles	1,000		
