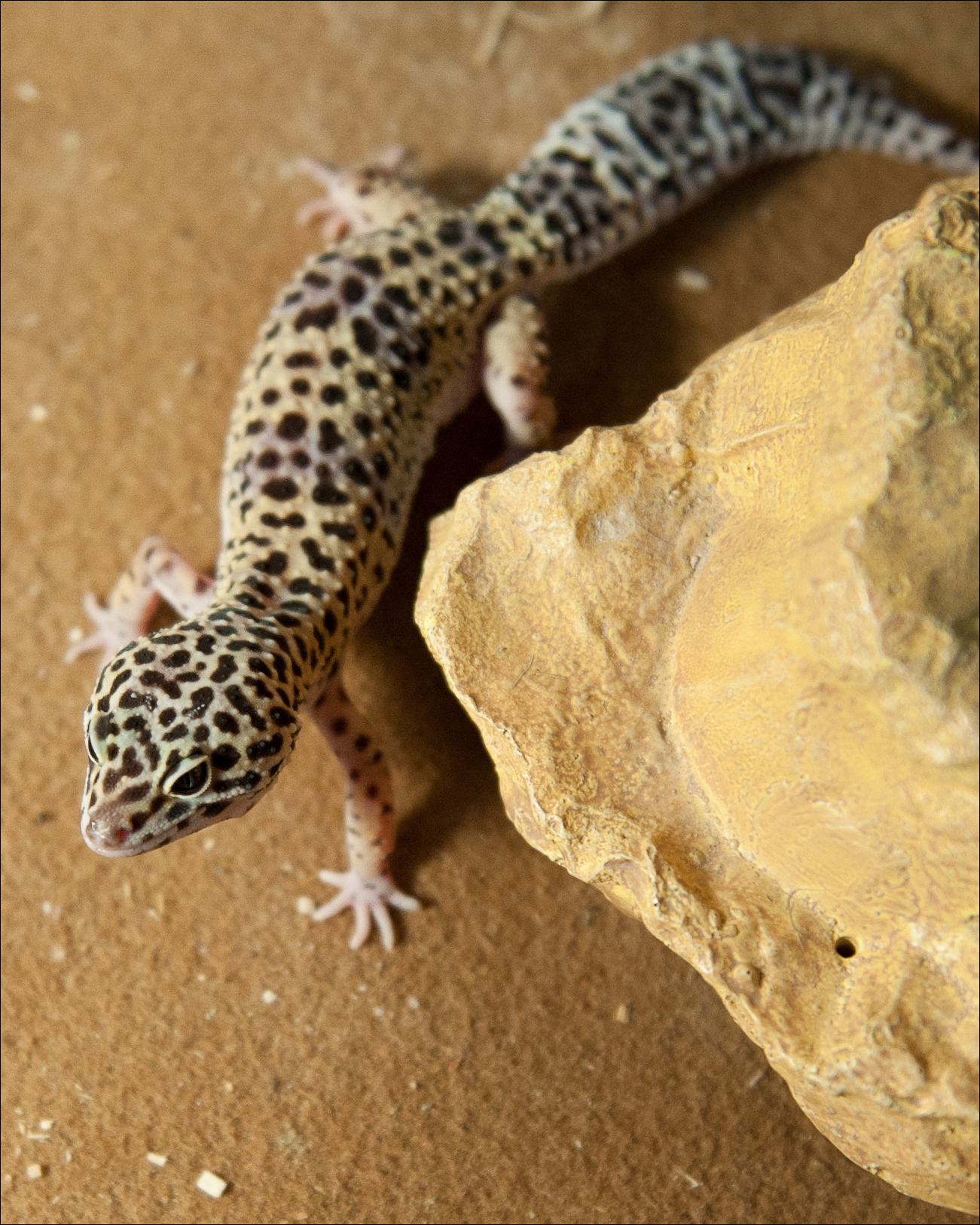
- A female Afghan Leopard Gecko

Scientific classification
- Kingdom: Animalia
- Phylum: Chordata
- Class: Reptilia
- Order: Squamata
- Suborder: Gekkota
- Family: Eublepharidae
- Genus: Eublepharis
- Species: E. macularius
- Subspecies: E. m. afghanicus

Trinomial name
- Eublepharis macularius afghanicus Börner 1976

= Afghan leopard gecko =

Subspecies of lizard

The Afghan leopard gecko (Eublepharis macularius afghanicus) is one of the five subspecies of the common leopard gecko, a small lizard belonging to the family Eublepharidae. This subspecies was first discovered by entomologist Carl Julius Bernhard Börner in 1976. It is much smaller than other leopard gecko subspecies.

== Distribution and habitat ==
The Afghan leopard gecko is native to southeastern Afghanistan along the Kabul River and its tributaries, its range extending into northern Pakistan. It can be found in the Hindu Kush Mountains. Its habitat includes rocky desert and sparse grassland, but it avoids sand. It does not live in large colonies and is most active in April and May.

== Appearance ==
The adult is pale to bright yellow dorsally, with scattered black or blue spots. There is a continuous light vertebral stripe. There are dark or light reticulations (netlike patterns) on the head. The limbs are blotched and the tail has irregular dark markings. The juvenile typically has three yellow bars along the back.

The male is about 15 centimeters long from snout to tail-tip. Females average about 14 centimeters.

== Known Health Issues ==
For pet owners, common health concerns in Afghan leopard geckos include metabolic bone disease, retained shed skin, vitamin A deficiency, eye disease, respiratory disease, intestinal parasites, impaction, skin infections, trauma, and egg binding (specifically in females). Despite their hardy nature, it is advised to see your vet if your gecko shows any signs of health issues.
