= Stanisław Czerski =

Polish Jesuit priest, artist, and translator

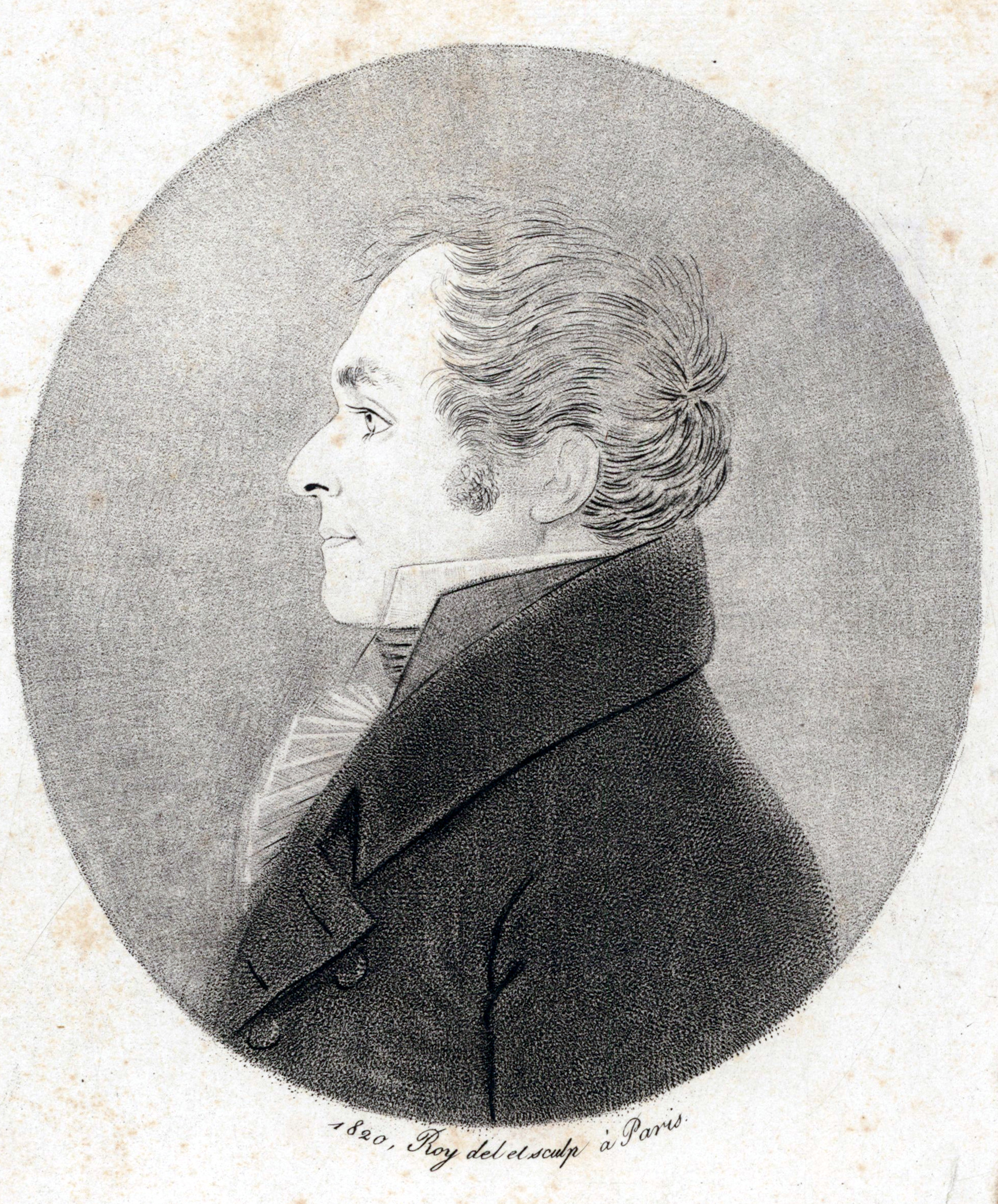
Stanisław Czerski

Stanislaw Czerski (October 10, 1777, in Latgale, Latvia – April 30, 1833, in Varniai, Lithuania) was a Polish Jesuit priest, graphic artist, and translator.

Czerski attended Polatsk Jesuit College. In 1794, he became a regular Jesuit, in 1807, a priest. He taught German language at Vitsebsk, Mahiliou, Polatsk, Orsha Jesuit colleges and Vilnius gymnasium. In 1814, he was a canon of Brest. Between 1819 and 1821, Czerski visited Paris, Germany, England, Italy for the scientific study tasks assigned by Vilnius University. In 1814, he became a canon of Varniai and in 1825, he was a priest in Salantai. It was here where he established wooden engraving workshop for making the maps and artworking the books. In 1822 he engraved Vilnius map in copper according to Georg Braun's Atlas, made in 1550, two vignettes for the Latin–Polish dictionary. He participated in the Uprising of 1831 and was arrested.

Czerski wrote in Polish and Latin. He translated fables by Phaedrus into Polish and Ode to God by Gavrila Derzhavin into Latin ("Carmen de Deo" in 1815), published the history of the land of Samogitia with engraved maps of Samogitian episcopate and Salantai parish, created Latin-Polish dictionary, wrote about lexicography issues.
