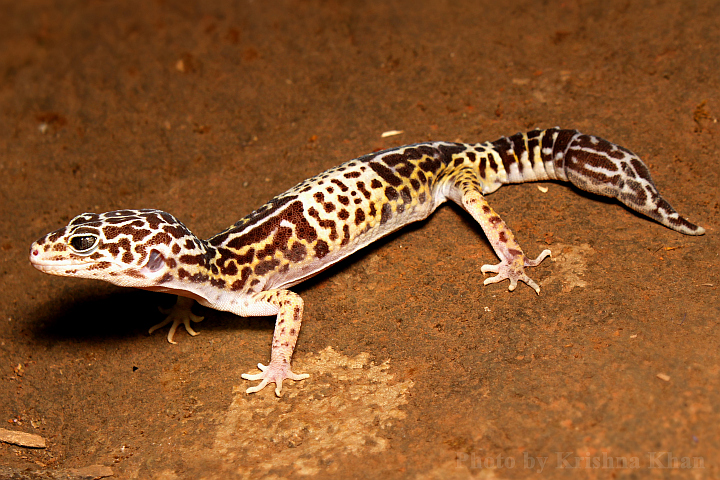

Conservation status
- Least Concern (IUCN 3.1)

Scientific classification
- Kingdom: Animalia
- Phylum: Chordata
- Class: Reptilia
- Order: Squamata
- Suborder: Gekkota
- Family: Eublepharidae
- Genus: Eublepharis
- Species: E. fuscus

Binomial name
- Eublepharis fuscus Börner, 1981

Synonyms
- Eublepharis macularius ssp. fuscus Börner, 1981

= West Indian leopard gecko =

Species of lizard

The West Indian leopard gecko (Eublepharis fuscus) is a species of leopard gecko found in western India, with its range possibly extending to southeastern Pakistan. The specific name "fuscus" means dark or dusky.

== Description ==
It has a robust habitus and can reach 252 mm (9.9 in) in snout–vent length. It also has spotted bands around the torso of its body, changing from pale yellow with black spots to dark yellow with black spots, or vice versa. It has a smaller tail than that of the domestic leopard gecko.

== Distribution ==
The gecko is widely distributed in western India: it is known from the Western Ghats (northern Karnataka and parts of Maharashtra) as well as from Gujarat. It might occur in Pakistan or Afganistan.

== Habitat and behavior ==
It can be found in forested hill tracts, scrub, boulders and scrubland. It is a nocturnal, terrestrial gecko that feeds on scorpions and other arthropods, including crickets.
