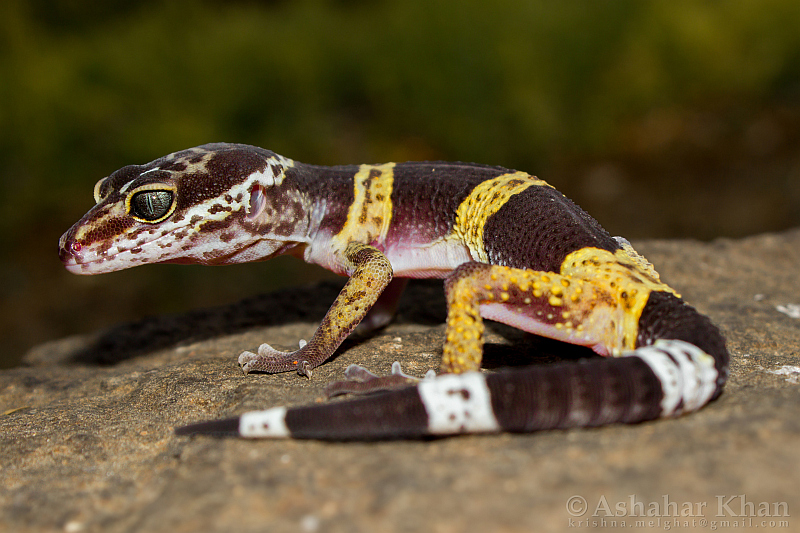

Conservation status
- Least Concern (IUCN 3.1)

Scientific classification
- Kingdom: Animalia
- Phylum: Chordata
- Class: Reptilia
- Order: Squamata
- Suborder: Gekkota
- Family: Eublepharidae
- Genus: Eublepharis
- Species: E. satpuraensis

Binomial name
- Eublepharis satpuraensis Mirza, Sanap, Raju, Gawai, & Ghadekar, 2014

Synonyms
- Eublepharis hardwickii – Khujaria, 1986; Eublepharis hardwickii – Chandra & Gupta, 2005

= Eublepharis satpuraensis =

Species of lizard

Eublepharis satpuraensis, sometimes called the Satpura leopard gecko, is a species of gecko. It is endemic to central Indian states of Madhya Pradesh, Maharashtra, and Chhattisgarh. It occurs in moist mixed deciduous forest, dry mixed deciduous forest, and dry peninsular sal forest at elevations of 390–1,350 m (1,280–4,430 ft) above sea level.

== Etymology ==
This species is named after the Satpura Hills in central India, where the type locality is located.

== Description ==
Eublepharis satpuraensis is a medium-sized representative of its genus, measuring 125–130 mm (4.9–5.1 in) in snout–vent length.
