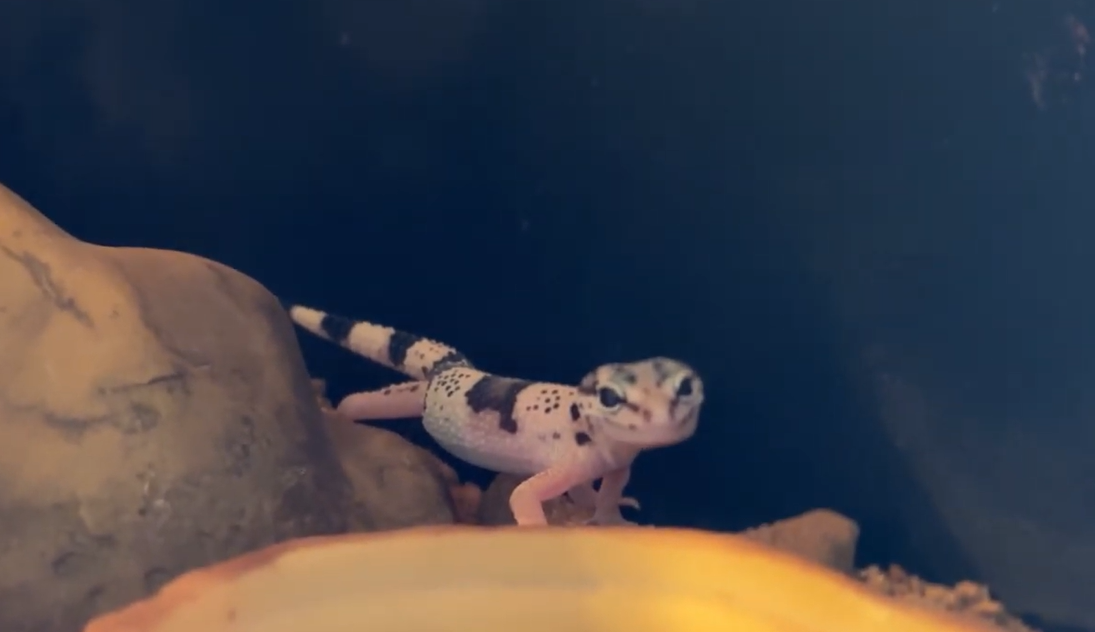

Conservation status
- Data Deficient (IUCN 3.1)

Scientific classification
- Kingdom: Animalia
- Phylum: Chordata
- Class: Reptilia
- Order: Squamata
- Suborder: Gekkota
- Family: Eublepharidae
- Genus: Eublepharis
- Species: E. angramainyu

Binomial name
- Eublepharis angramainyu Anderson & Leviton, 1966
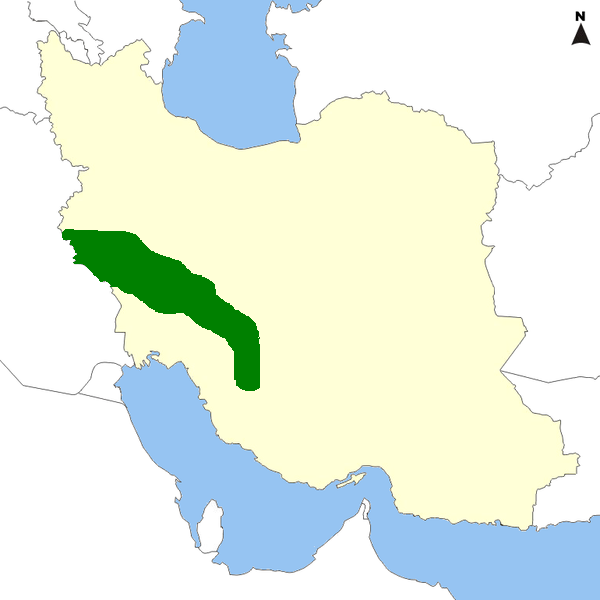
- Range in Iran.

= Eublepharis angramainyu =

Species of lizard

Eublepharis angramainyu, also known as the Iranian fat-tailed gecko, Iranian eyelid gecko or Iraqi eyelid gecko, is a nocturnal ground-dwelling lizard native to Iraq, Iran, Turkey and Syria. Its diet is insectivorous but may eat smaller vertebrates. Like most lizards it has the ability to shed its tail (autotomy).

The Iraqi eyelid gecko has a continuous light vertebral stripe extending from the occiput to the base of the tail, bordered on each side by broken black stripes.

Like most geckos in the Eublpharis genus they have a fatter tail with spots.
