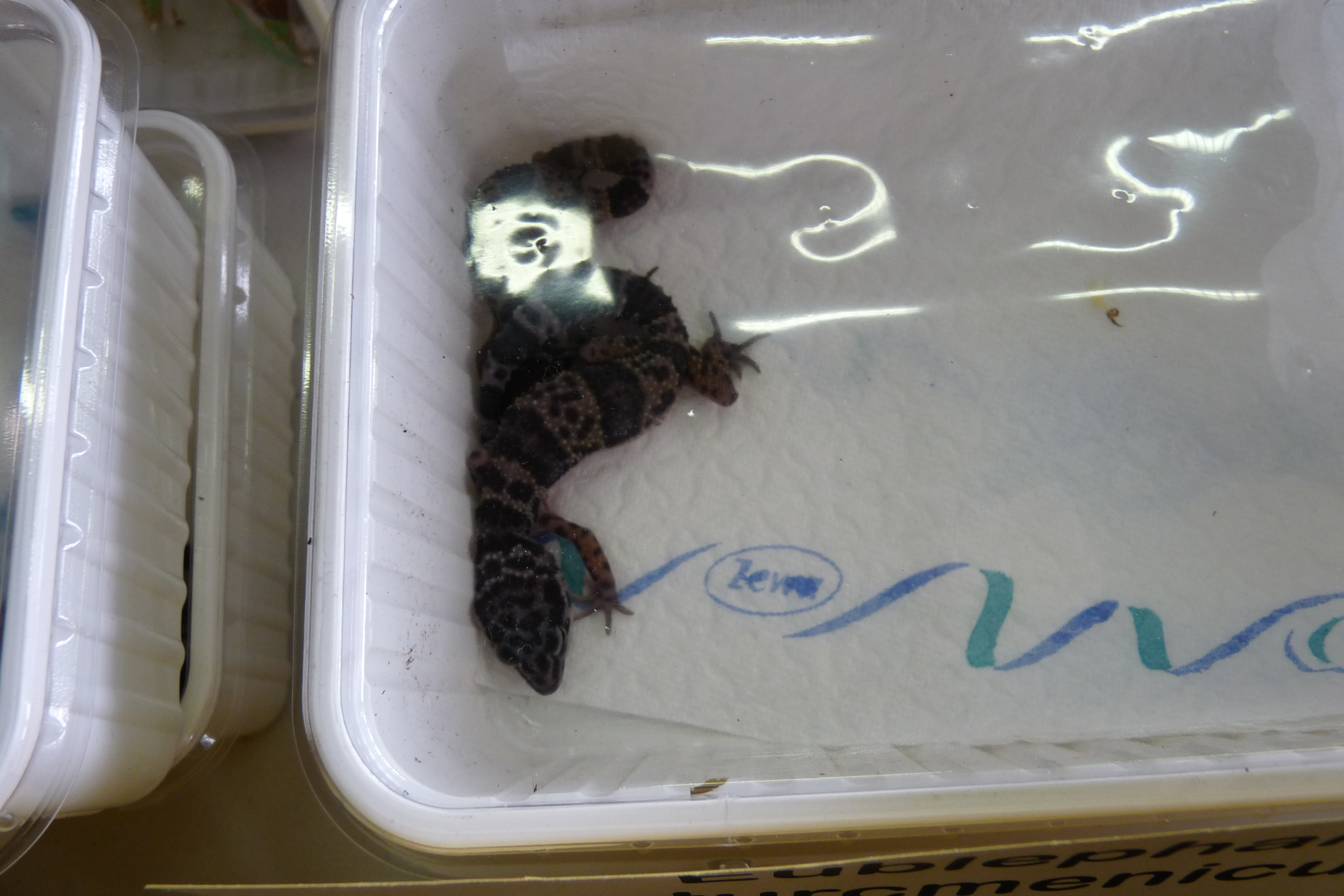

Conservation status
- Least Concern (IUCN 3.1)

Scientific classification
- Domain: Eukaryota
- Kingdom: Animalia
- Phylum: Chordata
- Class: Reptilia
- Order: Squamata
- Infraorder: Gekkota
- Family: Eublepharidae
- Genus: Eublepharis
- Species: E. turcmenicus

Binomial name
- Eublepharis turcmenicus Darevsky, 1977

= Turkmenistan eyelid gecko =

Species of lizard

The Turkmenistan eyelid gecko or Turkmenian eyelid gecko (Eublepharis turcmenicus) is a ground-dwelling lizard native to Turkmenistan and northern Iran. It inhabits rocky and stony foothills and slopes at elevations up to 1,000 m (3,300 ft) above sea level. It is oviparous, typically laying clutches of two eggs. Mainly insectivorous, it may also eat smaller vertebrates. Like many other lizards has the ability to shed its tail (autotomy).
