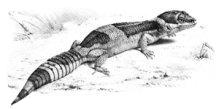

Conservation status
- Least Concern (IUCN 3.1)

Scientific classification
- Kingdom: Animalia
- Phylum: Chordata
- Class: Reptilia
- Order: Squamata
- Suborder: Gekkota
- Family: Eublepharidae
- Genus: Eublepharis
- Species: E. hardwickii

Binomial name
- Eublepharis hardwickii Gray, 1827

= East Indian leopard gecko =

Species of lizard

The East Indian leopard gecko (Eublepharis hardwickii), also known commonly as Hardwicke's gecko, is a species of gecko, a lizard in the family Eublepharidae. The species is endemic to India and Bangladesh. The specific name, hardwickii, is in honor of English naturalist Thomas Hardwicke.

== Etymology ==
The specific name, hardwickii, is in honor of English naturalist Thomas Hardwicke.

== Description ==
Body stout; limbs rather short; digits short. Snout as long as distance between orbit and ear-opening; the latter large, suboval, vertical. Head covered-with irregular polygonal scales, intermixed with enlarged tubercles on the temple and occiput; rostral sub-pentagonal, twice as broad as high, with, median cleft above; 3 or 4 internasals; about 10 upper and as many lower labials; mental broadly pentagonal, in contact with two enlarged chin-shields, surrounded by irregular smaller ones passing gradually into the flat granules of the gular region. Body covered above with small, irregular, flat scales, intermixed with numerous roundish, subconical tubercles; these tubercles larger than the interspaces between them. Male with 14 to 18 preanal pores. Tail swollen, rounded, tapering at the end, verticillated, above with small flat scales and rows of enlarged sub-corneal tubercles, beneath with larger flat scales arranged regularly. Above reddish brown and cream-coloured; the former colour occupies the head and forms two broad bands across the back, the anterior broadest, and three round the tail; the latter borders the upper lip and extends as a horseshoe-shaped band to the other side, passing across the neck; it also occupies the interspace between the dorsal and caudal brown bands, which are by far the widest; lower surfaces white.

Pale reddish white: the upper part of the head from the nose to the nape, two very broad bands across the trunk, and three or four rings round the tail deep brown or black, the brown portions being edged with black, and broader than the ground-colour. Limbs reddish olive, with black dots on the elbows and knees. There are ten upper and lower labials; two chin-shields larger than the first lower labial. The scales of the middle of the belly form thirty longitudinal series; seventeen pores in an angular series in the pre-anal region.

This species attains a length of from 8 to 9 inches (20 to 23 cm).

== Geographic range ==
Günther mentions four specimens of E. hardwickii: one from Chittagong, two from Russelconda, Madras Presidency, and a fourth from the Anamallai Mountains, collected by Captain R. H. Beddome. W. Elliot, Esq., has also found it in the public bath at Waltair, a suburb of Vizagapatam.

== Biology ==
Singh (1984) writes that the species E. hardwickii was common (in the 1970s) at Tikerpada, a village at 600m elevation on the banks of the Mahanadi river in the Satkoshia Gorge Sanctuary of Odisha. In the night, during summer and rains, these may be found on the forest roads or on open areas, and in the day several individuals were found underneath rocks and stones. He collected specimens from the Satkoshia Gorge and bred these in captivity at Tikarpada. In captivity E. hardwickii was found to be timid, allowing to be lifted by hand and accepting a variety of insects as diet. Prey were detected by their movements. At least one definite case of cannibalism was recorded in captivity – mode of capture was from the neck and during swallowing the victim lay with its ventral side up. E. hardwickii never took water from a container in captivity; instead, they used to wait for an artificial shower to lick off drops falling on their head or sticking to the surfaces on the surroundings. The tongue is pinkish red, flat, thin and able to extend over to the eyes and head. One or two leathery eggs (approx. 20 x 10 mm) are laid and buried in soil. Eublepharis hardwickii is called the Kalakuta Sapa in Odisha (Oriya: Kalakuta = one which brings the message of death, and Sapa = snake). The local name originates from belief that these geckoes are highly poisonous, can climb trees (which these can) and after a bite the higher they climb the effect of the poison gets gradually intensified. The gecko makes a shrill vibrating noise when surprised.

The stomach contents of a male palm civet, Paradoxurus hermaphroditus caught from the wild at Tikerpada contained, with seven other items of foraged food, a piece of 5 cm long body part of Eublepharis hardwickii.

== Distribution ==
Eastern India, (Anaimalai Hills), Odisha, Bangladesh Type locality: Chittagong, Penang.
