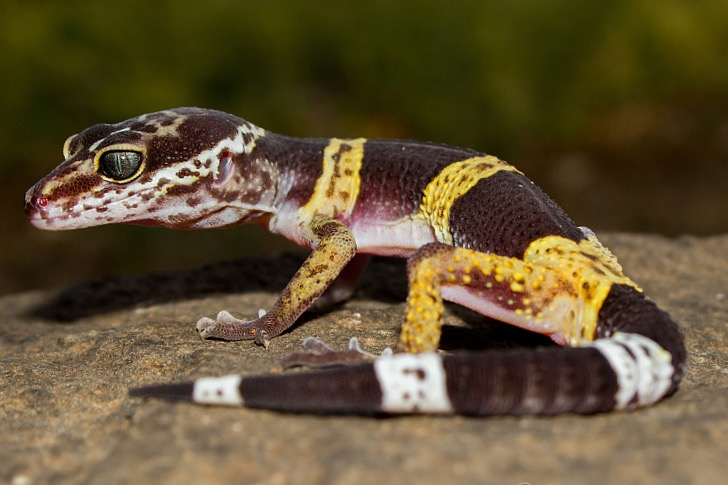
- Satpura leopard gecko (Eublepharis satpuraensis)

Scientific classification
- Kingdom: Animalia
- Phylum: Chordata
- Class: Reptilia
- Order: Squamata
- Suborder: Gekkota
- Family: Eublepharidae
- Genus: Eublepharis; Gray, 1827

Species
- Eublepharis angramainyu Eublepharis fuscus Eublepharis hardwickii Eublepharis macularius Eublepharis pictus Eublepharis satpuraensis Eublepharis turcmenicus

= Eublepharis =

Eublepharis Temporal range: Pleistocene - Recent

Genus of reptiles

Eublepharis is a genus of terrestrial geckos native to eastern and southwestern Asia. The genus was first described by the British zoologist John Edward Gray in 1827. The etymology of their name is 'eu' = good (=true) |'blephar' = eyelid, and all have fully functional eyelids. Members of this genus are found in eastern and southwestern Asia. These geckos are sturdily built. Their tail is shorter than their snout–vent length, and their body is covered with numerous wart-like bumps. The toes do not have adhesive lamellae or membranes (Eublepharis cannot climb like their other gecko cousins). Like all members of Eublepharidae, they are primarily nocturnal. Included in this group is the popular pet leopard gecko Eublepharis macularius.

== Species of the genus Eublepharis ==
Image	Scientific name	Common name	Distribution
	Eublepharis angramainyu	Iraqi eyelid gecko	Iraq, Iran, Turkey and Syria.
	Eublepharis fuscus	West Indian leopard gecko	western India, with its range possibly extending to southeastern Pakistan
	Eublepharis hardwickii	East Indian leopard gecko	India and Bangladesh.
	Eublepharis macularius	Common leopard gecko	Afghanistan, Iran, Pakistan, India, and Nepal.
	Eublepharis pictus	painted leopard gecko	India.
	Eublepharis satpuraensis	Satpura leopard gecko	central Indian states of Madhya Pradesh, Maharashtra and Chhattisgarh
	Eublepharis turcmenicus	Turkmenistan eyelid gecko	Turkmenistan and northern Iran.

The members of the Goniurosaurus kuroiwae superspecies were formerly considered members of the genus Eublepharis.
