= God (Derzhavin ode) =

God (Russian title: Бог Bog; finished 1784) is a poem by Gavrila Derzhavin.

== Background ==
In the 18th century the deists of various European nations reveled in singing praises to God. Such odes were produced by Voltaire, Klopstock, Haller, Brockes and Young. In Russia, the fashion was set by Lomonosov's "The True God".

== Description ==
Derzhavin commenced writing "God" in 1780, but finished it only in 1784, under the influence of a strong religious emotion. It begins with an appeal to God, then extols the infinite power and wisdom of the Divinity. The individual is the reflex of the Divinity, and hence not insignificant. The relationship to God is recognized and, therefore, immortality beyond the grave is assured.

== Translations ==
Derzhavin's "God" was at once translated into most of the European languages and into Japanese by Admiral Golovnin. There are at least 15 French versions of the poem, while in English available translations include: "To God", in The Bakchesarian Fountain (Philadelphia, 1849) by W. D. Lewis; "Ode to the Deity", by J. K. Stallybrass in The Leisure Hour (London) of May 2, 1870; and "Ode to God", by N. H. Dole in volume X of The Chautauquan. Stanisław Czerski translated the ode into Latin in 1815: "Carmen de Deo".

== Music ==
A music composition of 6 verses called "Ode to Diety" was published by O.Z. Hanish in 1909 in the songbook "Avesta in Song" page 1,2,3,4,5 till page 30
