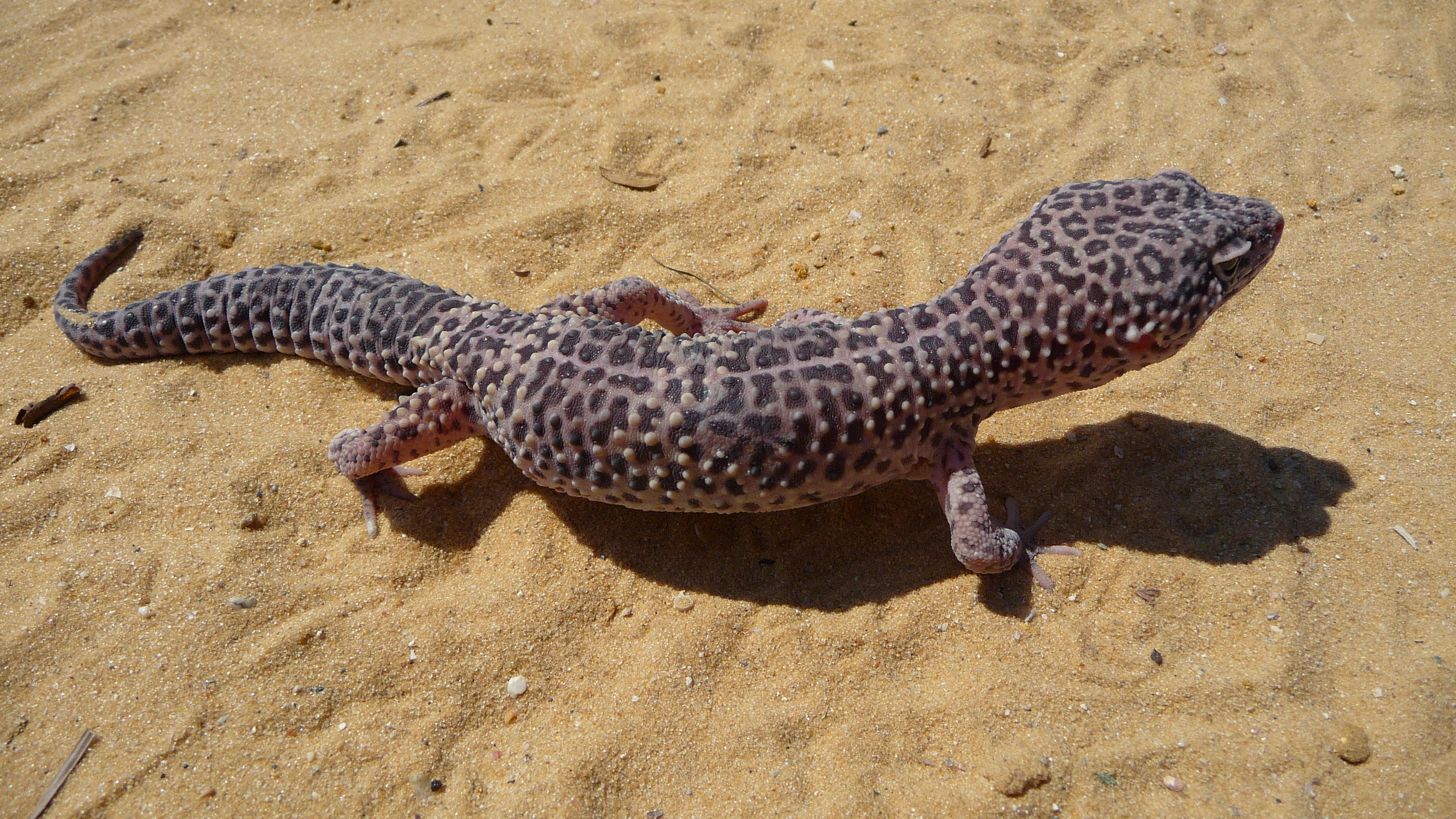

Conservation status
- Least Concern (IUCN 3.1)

Scientific classification
- Kingdom: Animalia
- Phylum: Chordata
- Class: Reptilia
- Order: Squamata
- Suborder: Gekkota
- Family: Eublepharidae
- Genus: Eublepharis
- Species: E. macularius

Binomial name
- Eublepharis macularius (Blyth, 1854)
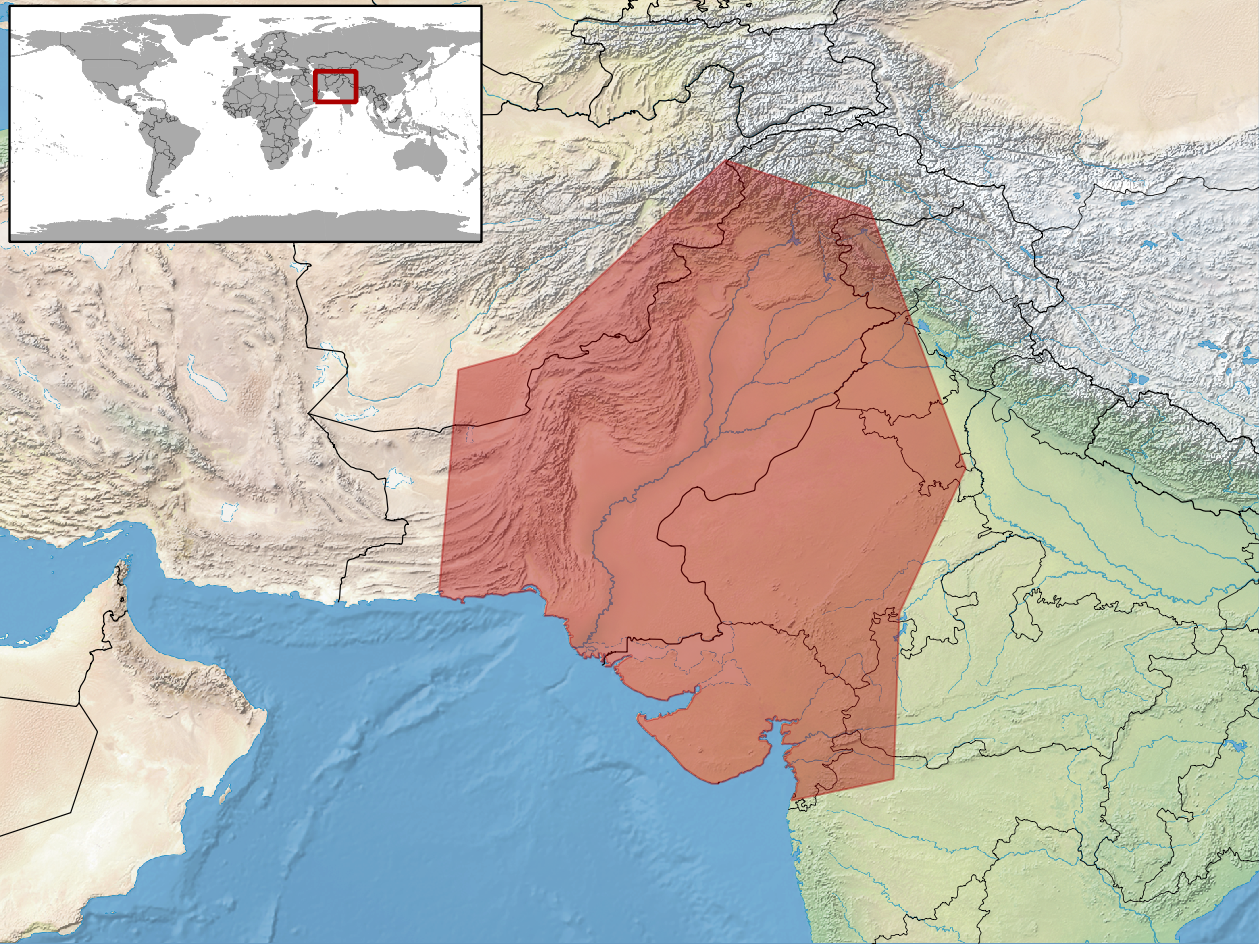

Synonyms
- Cyrtodactylus macularius; Cyrtodactylus madarensis; Eublepharis fasciolatus; Eublepharis gracilis

= Leopard gecko =

Species of reptile

The leopard gecko or common leopard gecko (Eublepharis macularius) is a ground-dwelling gecko native primarily to the rocky dry grassland and desert regions of Afghanistan, Iran, Pakistan, India, and Nepal. The leopard gecko is a popular pet, and due to extensive captive breeding it is sometimes considered as the first domesticated species of lizard.

== Taxonomy ==
Leopard geckos were first described by zoologist Edward Blyth in 1854 as Eublepharis macularius. The generic name Eublepharis is a combination of the Greek words eu (good) and blepharos (eyelid), as having mobile upper and lower eyelids is the primary characteristic that distinguishes members of this family from other geckos, along with a lack of lamellae. The specific name macularius derives from the Latin word macula meaning "spot" or "blemish", referring to the animal's natural spotted markings.

There are five subspecies of E. macularius:

- Eublepharis macularius afghanicus
- Eublepharis macularius fasciolatus
- Eublepharis macularius macularius
- Eublepharis macularius montanus
- Eublepharis macularius smithi

== Distribution and habitat ==
The native habitat of the leopard gecko includes the rocky, dry grassland, and desert regions of south-Asia: it is naturally found in Afghanistan, Pakistan, Northwest India, western Nepal, and some parts of Iran.

Leopard geckos inhabit arid and semi-arid areas with sparse vegetation and clay or sandy soils, as well as rocky habitat where crevices can be used as shelter. They reportedly avoid areas where the primary substrate is sand. Leopard geckos may also be found in arid forests of Nepal and Pakistan, and are reported to shelter under loose bark of trees in these environments. Winter temperatures within the range of the leopard gecko may drop below 10 °C (50 °F), forcing the animals underground into brumation to live on its fat reserves.

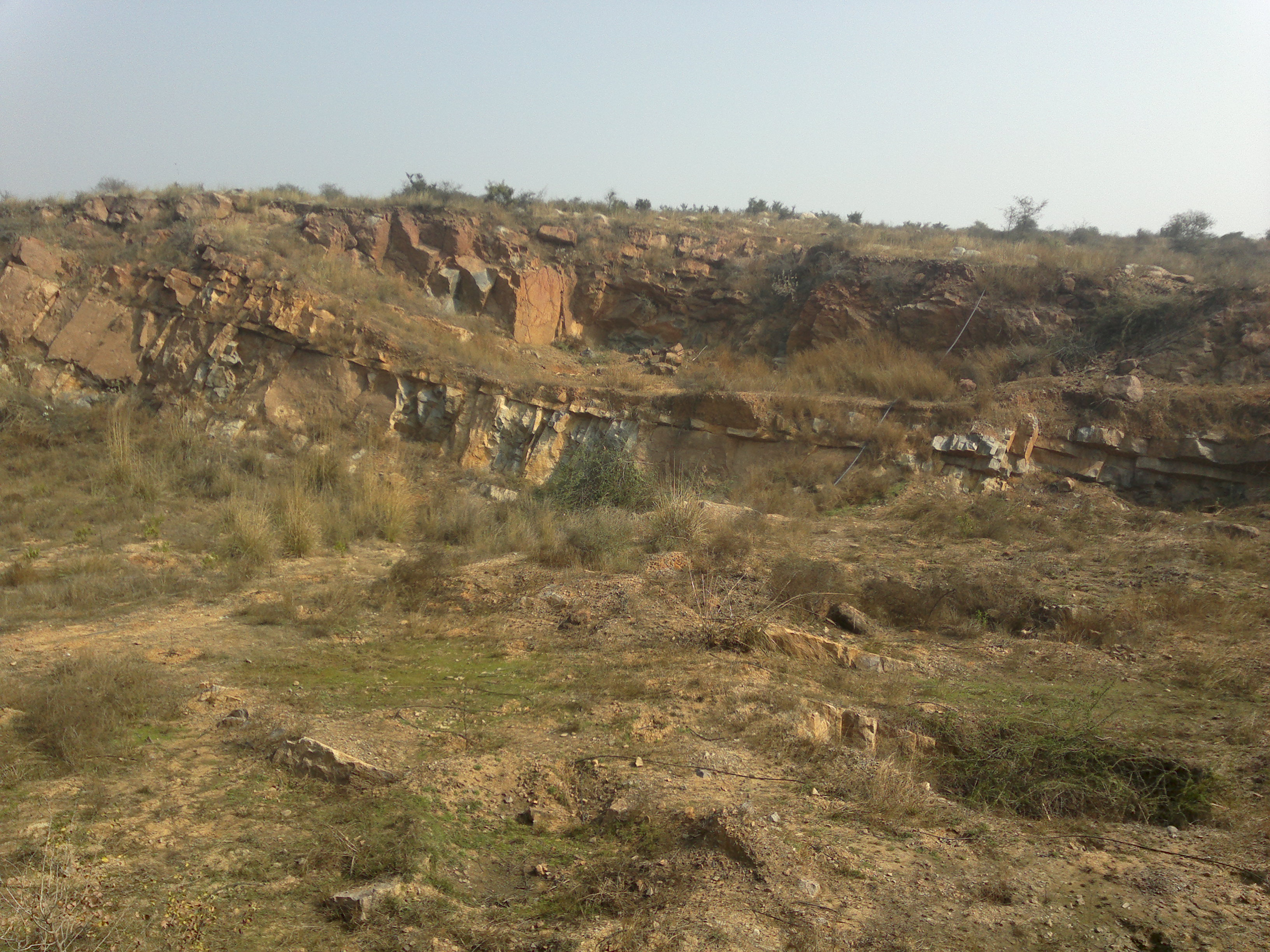
The Aravalli Biodiversity Park in Delhi, India, is a habitat populated by leopard gecko.

== Description ==
Leopard geckos are small lizards that derive their name from their spotted coloration. Hatchlings are on average 7 to 10 cm (2.8 to 3.9 in) in length and weigh about 2 to 5 g (0.071 to 0.176 oz). Adult females are about 18 to 20 cm (7.1 to 7.9 in) in length and weigh about 50 to 70 g (1.8 to 2.5 oz), while adult male geckos are about 20 to 28 cm (7.9 to 11.0 in) in length and weigh about 60 to 80 g (2.1 to 2.8 oz). Sexual dimorphism is visible in adult males and females, but can be difficult to determine in young geckos. Examination of a gecko's underside is a reliable method determining its sex: males have pre-anal pores and hemipenal bulges while females have smaller pores and do not have external bulges.

Leopard geckos range in color from a yellow to brownish-orange base with spots covering all or mostly half of the dorsal region of the body. Their color is derived from pigment-containing cells known as chromatophores, which are responsible for an array of coloration seen in all reptiles, amphibians, birds and some species of insects. Chromatophores come in a variety of types based on the color they correspond to. Chromatophore types include xanthophores (responsible for yellow coloration), erythrophores (responsible for red coloration), iridophores (responsible for iridescence), leucophores (responsible for white coloration), melanophores (responsible for black coloration), and cyanophores (responsible for blue coloration). The skin of wild leopard geckos contains xanthophores (yellow) and melanophores (black spots). Designer leopard geckos may possess erythrophores and leucophores since commercial breeding and artificial selection have allowed novel coloration to arise.

Unlike many other species of geckos, leopard gecko toes do not have adhesive lamellae, so they cannot climb smooth vertical walls.

Leopard geckos are polyphyodonts and able to replace each of their 100 teeth every 3 to 4 months. Next to the full grown tooth there is a small replacement tooth developing from the odontogenic stem cell in the dental lamina.

In the wild, leopard geckos live for an average of 4.9 years, while in captivity they can live for more than 20 years with the proper care.

=== Tails ===
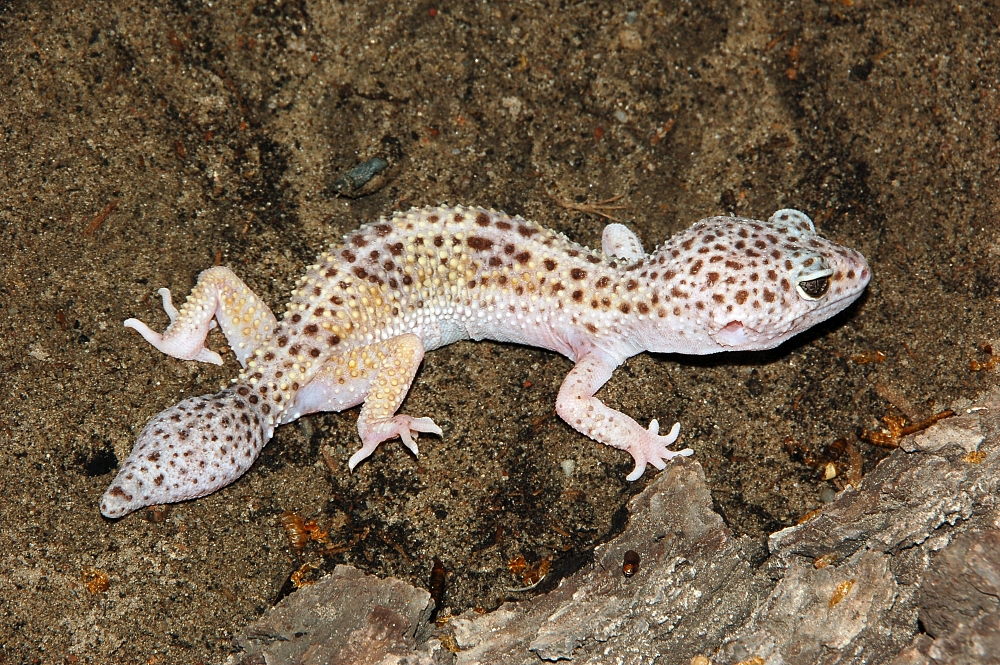
E. macularius with regenerated tail

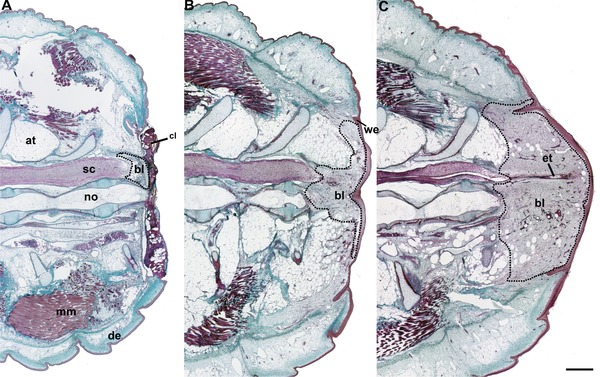
Tail Regeneration in E. macularius. (A) Three days post‐autotomy: Initially the site of tail loss is capped by a temporary clot. Note the earliest evidence of the blastema (hatched area). (B) Eight days post autonomy: loss of the clot reveals a complete wound epithelium. The blastema continues to expand both distally and laterally. (C) With continued growth, the blastema begins to dominate the site of tail loss.

Leopard geckos have distinctly thick tails that store fat; similar to the way in which camels' humps serve as reservoirs of fatty tissue, the fat stored in the tails of leopard geckos acts as an energy reserve that the geckos can use as nourishment if there is not an available food supply. When hunting, a leopard gecko may lift its tail in a twitching or wagging motion as it approaches its prey; after the gecko eats its prey, the tail will then return to a relaxed position.

Like most geckos, leopard geckos have an ability called autotomy: the ability to "drop" their tail and regrow them. After detachment the tail can continue to twitch for as long as 30 minutes, providing a distraction to buy time for the gecko to escape from its predator. The tail is large and at least in one related species (Christinus marmoratus) it has been reported that the tail-less fleeing gecko makes for a quicker getaway. Fractures in the tailbone allow the tail to separate easily and rapid vasoconstriction allows the gecko to suffer minimal blood loss. This detaching of the tail causes a high level of stress on the gecko due to the loss of the valuable storage of fat it once had. It will start to regenerate its tail immediately after detachment. Regenerated tails often retain similar colors to the original tail, though they are often smooth and generally shorter and wider than the original tail.

== Biology ==
Wild leopard geckos are generally considered to be nocturnal by field biology sources, academic herpetology sources, and some animal husbandry guides. During the day they retreat to burrows and sheltered hiding spots, becoming active at dusk when the temperature is favorable. Naturalist David Attenborough asserts in the wildlife documentary series Life in Cold Blood: "A leopard gecko—like most geckos—is nocturnal, and it manages to get all the heat it needs from rocks, which retain something of their warmth for several hours after the sun has set." Similarly, Nepalese biologist Yam Rawat writes: "Leopard Geckos remained undetected in Nepal until [2016]. This could be attributable to the secretive nocturnal nature of the species." In contrast, some sources focused on husbandry of captive leopard geckos have asserted leopard geckos are crepuscular or even cathemeral reptiles. This assertion has been used to explain the ability of leopard geckos to use UVB exposure to synthesize vitamin D3 in captivity, and as a rationale for providing captive leopard geckos with access to UVB lighting. John Courtney Smith, the brand manager for UVB light manufacturing company Arcadia Reptile, asserts in Bio-activity and the Theory of Wild Re-Creation: "The leopard gecko is quite crepuscular in its home range ... there are many reports of them being seen even in full daytime desert sunlight openly basking".

There is also debate as to the degree that leopard geckos interact with conspecifics in the wild. Academic sources have asserted that leopard geckos live in loose colonies in the wild. Pet keeping guides often claim these geckos are solitary and do not usually live with other animals. Males can determine the sex of other leopard geckos by smelling pheromones on their skin: they respond to other males with aggressive behavior while they demonstrate courtship behavior towards females. Towards other males, the male would raise itself up from the ground, extend his limbs, and arch his back with the swelling of the tongue in aggression. He will then make short dashes and quick, vigorous bites, which frequently lacerate the skin and sometimes severely injure his opponent. Males behave the same way towards females while females are shedding their skin. Before and after the shedding of the skin, the males still express courtship behavior towards the females.

Wild leopard geckos’ primary defense against predators is to avoid detection. This is accomplished with cryptic coloration serving as camouflage. They also remain hidden during daytime, to avoid heat and the risk of being spotted and captured by diurnal predators. If a leopard gecko is confronted by a potential predator, it may vocalize in an attempt to ward off this predator.

=== Diet ===
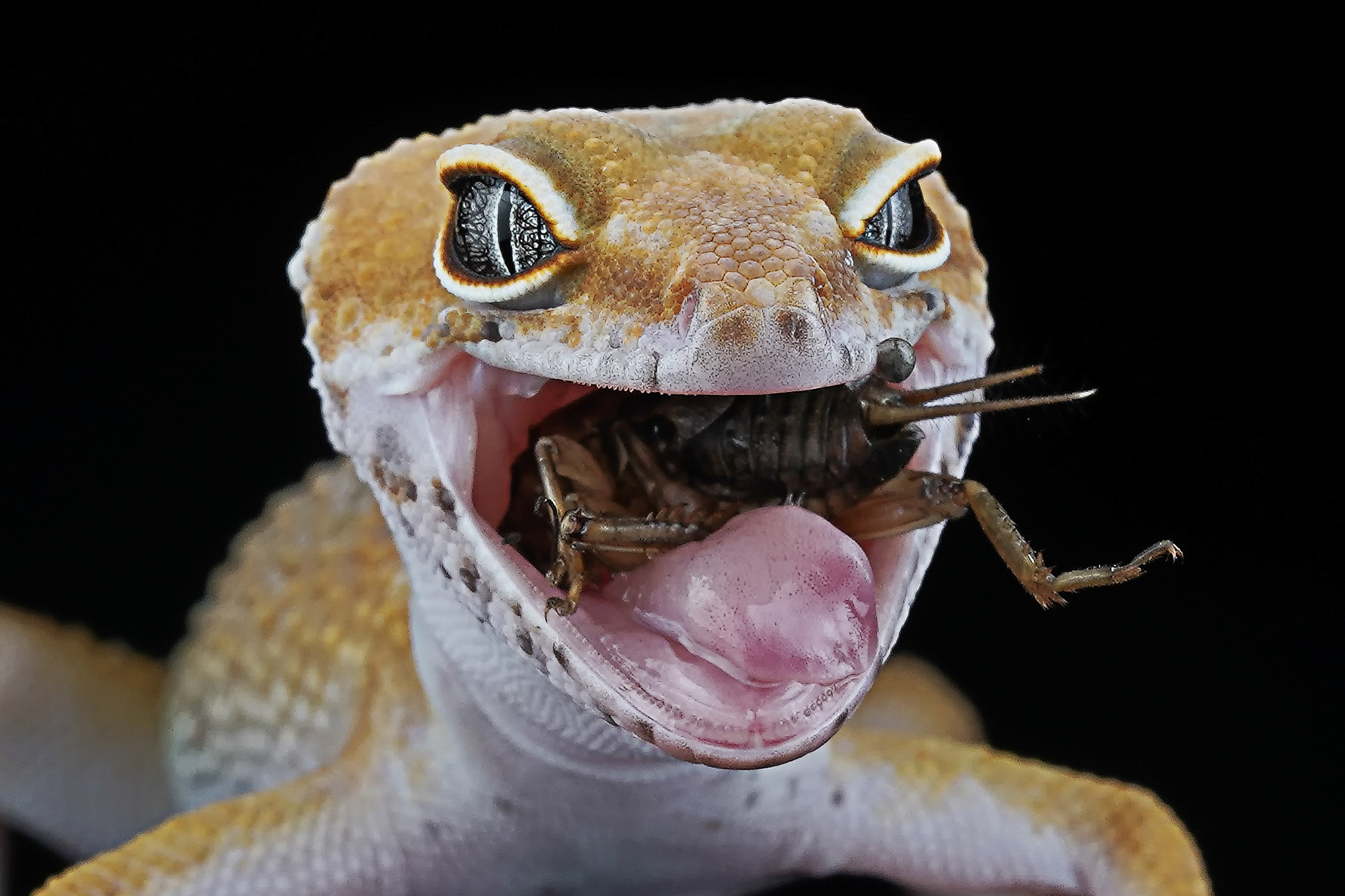
A leopard gecko consumes a cricket

Leopard geckos are opportunistic predators that eat a variety of prey items. Invertebrates are presumed to make up the majority of wild geckos' diets, but they will also eat small vertebrate prey if given the opportunity, including mouse pups, smaller reptiles, and even hatchling leopard geckos. Breeders of captive leopard geckos report that sufficiently fed leopard geckos will not cannibalize young, and that the cannibalistic behavior appears to take place only in poorly fed animals.

=== Reproduction ===
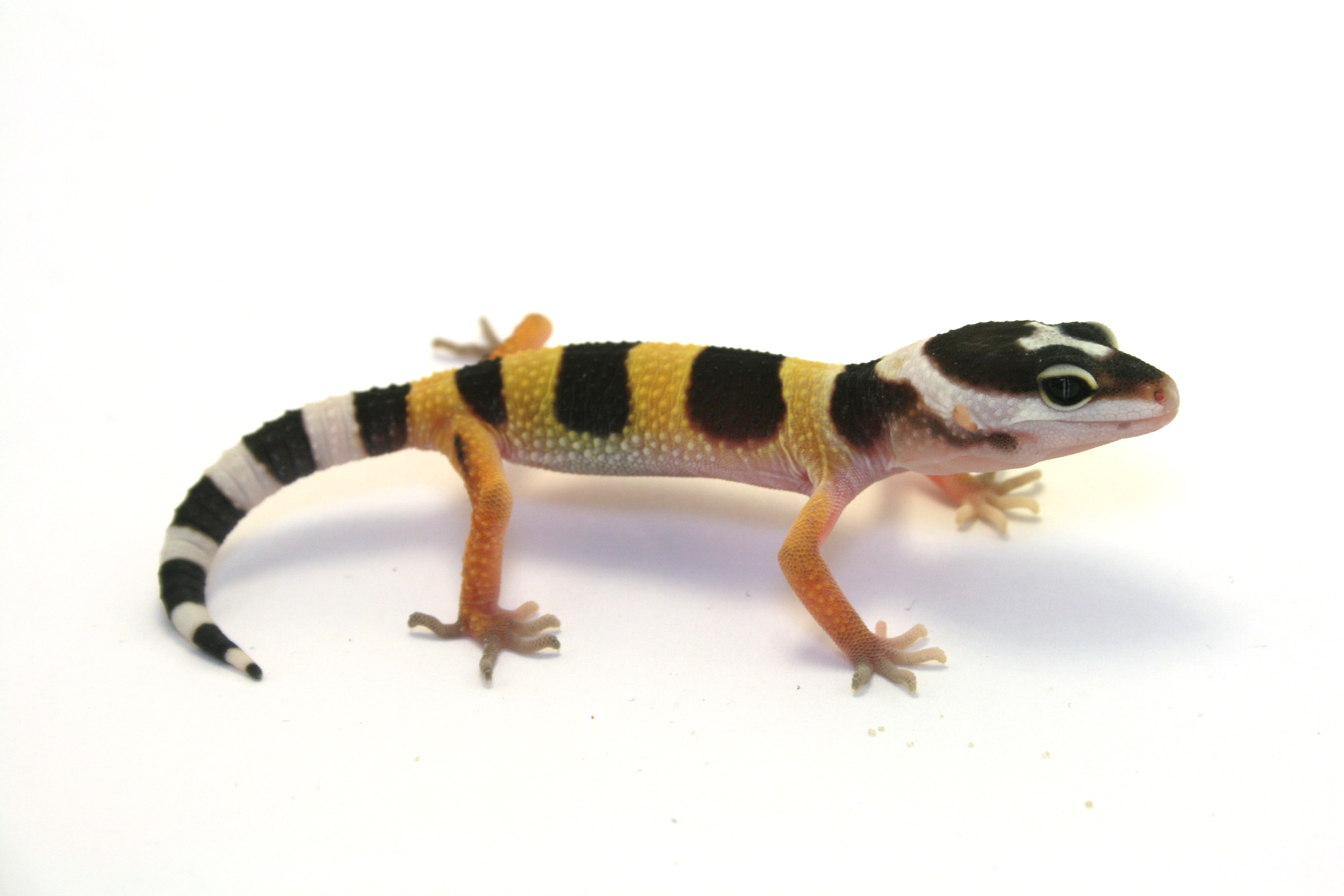
A hatchling leopard gecko displays the characteristic banded coloration of juveniles.

Leopard geckos typically breed in the summer. Females can store sperm over the course of their breeding season, and produce up to three clutches from one or two copulations. Females can lay about six to eight clutches of two eggs; eggs are laid approximately 21 to 28 days after mating. The average incubation time is anywhere between 35 and 89 days, although it is usually closer to the latter. Baby leopard geckos will have an "egg tooth", a calcareous tip at the end of its snout to help break their egg shell. Their "egg tooth" will fall off within one to two days. In addition to this, their skin will usually shed within 24 hours of hatching. The leopard gecko hatchling will not be able to eat until after the first shedding.

Leopard geckos have temperature-dependent sex determination. Embryos incubated in predominantly cool temperatures (about 26–29 °C [79–84 °F]) or very warm temperatures (about 34–35 °C [93–95 °F]) will develop as females, while embryos incubated at intermediate temperatures (about 31–33 °C [88–91 °F]) will develop as male. Determination of sex is believed to be set during the first two weeks of incubation. Females born in the higher temperatures differed from those who were born in the lower temperatures hormonally and behaviorally: those born in the warmer temperatures expressed more aggressive behavior. These are known as "hot females" and are often determined to be infertile.

== Relation to humans ==
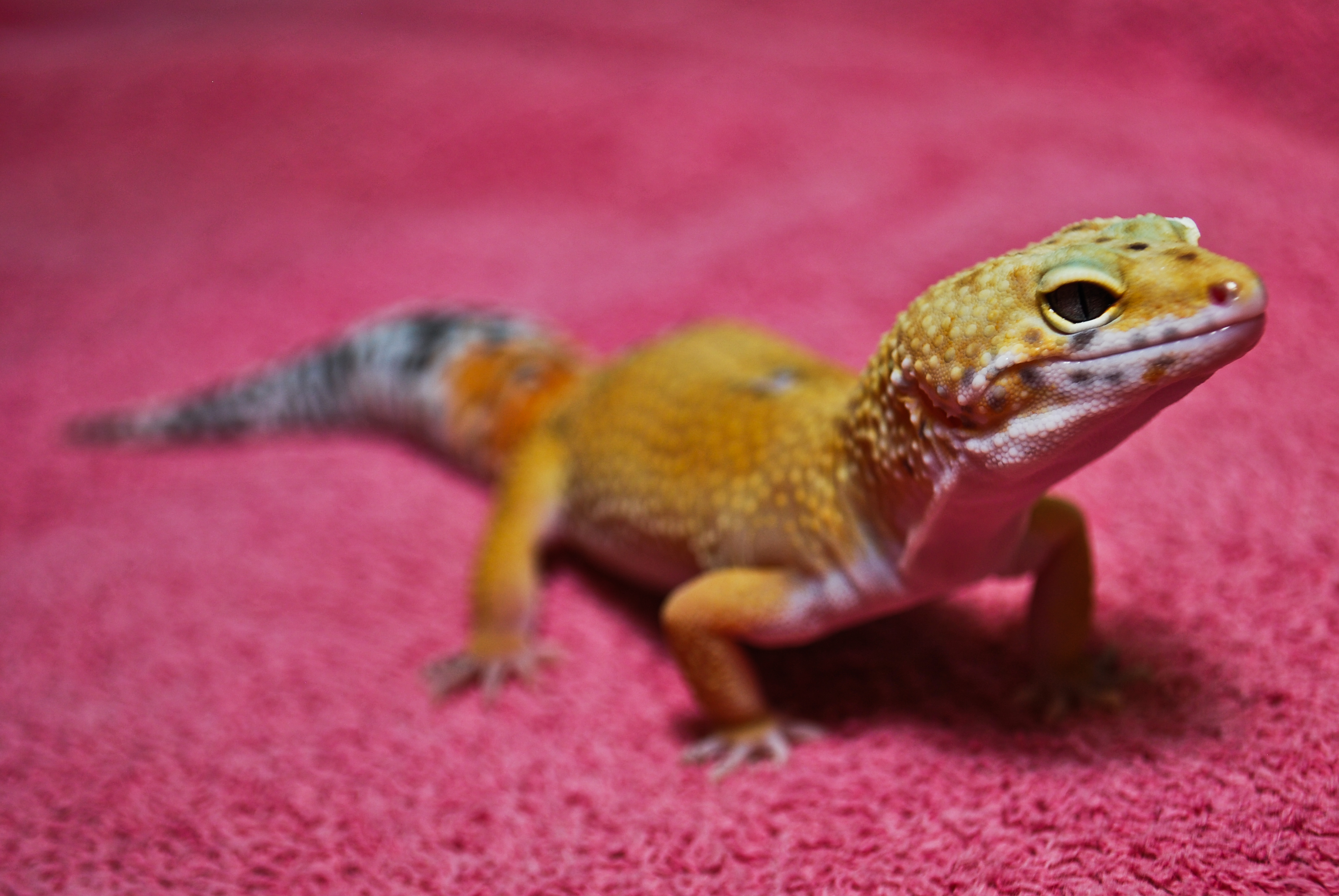
A pet leopard gecko. Note the coloration has diverged from the spotted wild type due to selective breeding.

Leopard geckos are one of the most popular lizard pets, second only to the bearded dragon. Leopard geckos were among the first lizard species to become widely established in the pet trade, owing in part to their adaptability to captive conditions and ability to breed readily in captivity. They are easy to breed under captive conditions, so most sold are captive-bred rather than wild-caught. Due to extensive captive breeding and artificial selection, captive animals display a range of colors and patterns called morphs. Those found in the wild typically have more dull colorations than those kept in captivity as pets.

=== As a model organism ===
Leopard geckos are widely used as model organisms in laboratory and experimental research. Their long history of captive breeding, relatively straightforward husbandry and extensive variation in colour and pattern make them useful for investigating the genetic basis of phenotypic variation in reptiles. Selectively bred colour morphs, including the Lemon Frost morph, have helped in investigating the genetic mechanisms responsible for variation in reptilian coloration.

The Lemon Frost morph is of particular scientific interest because of its association with iridophoromas, tumours arising from iridophores, which are pigment cells responsible for reflective coloration. This morph has been useful for studying the genetic mechanisms underlying pigment-cell development and tumour formation in reptiles.

== Gallery ==
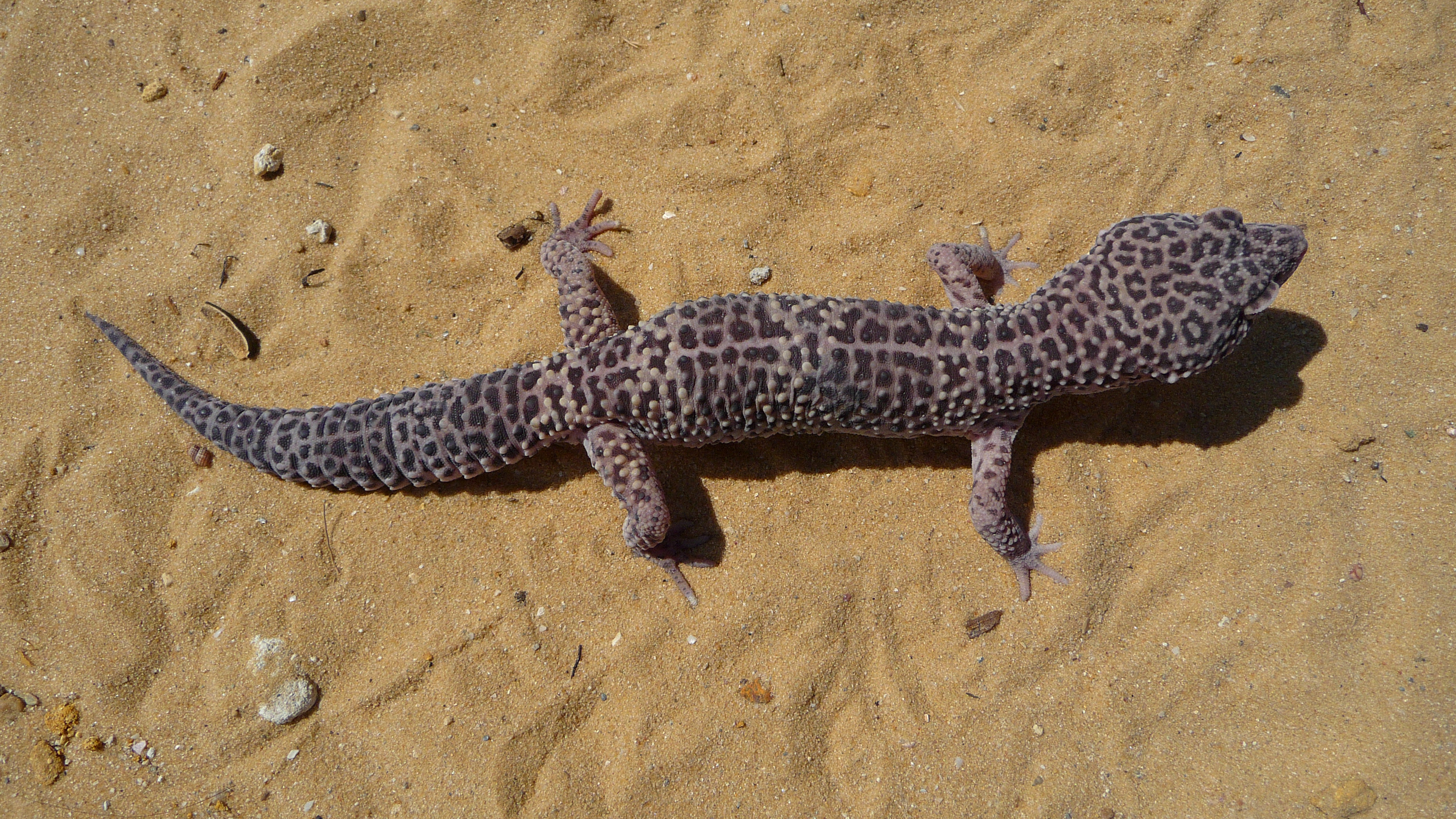

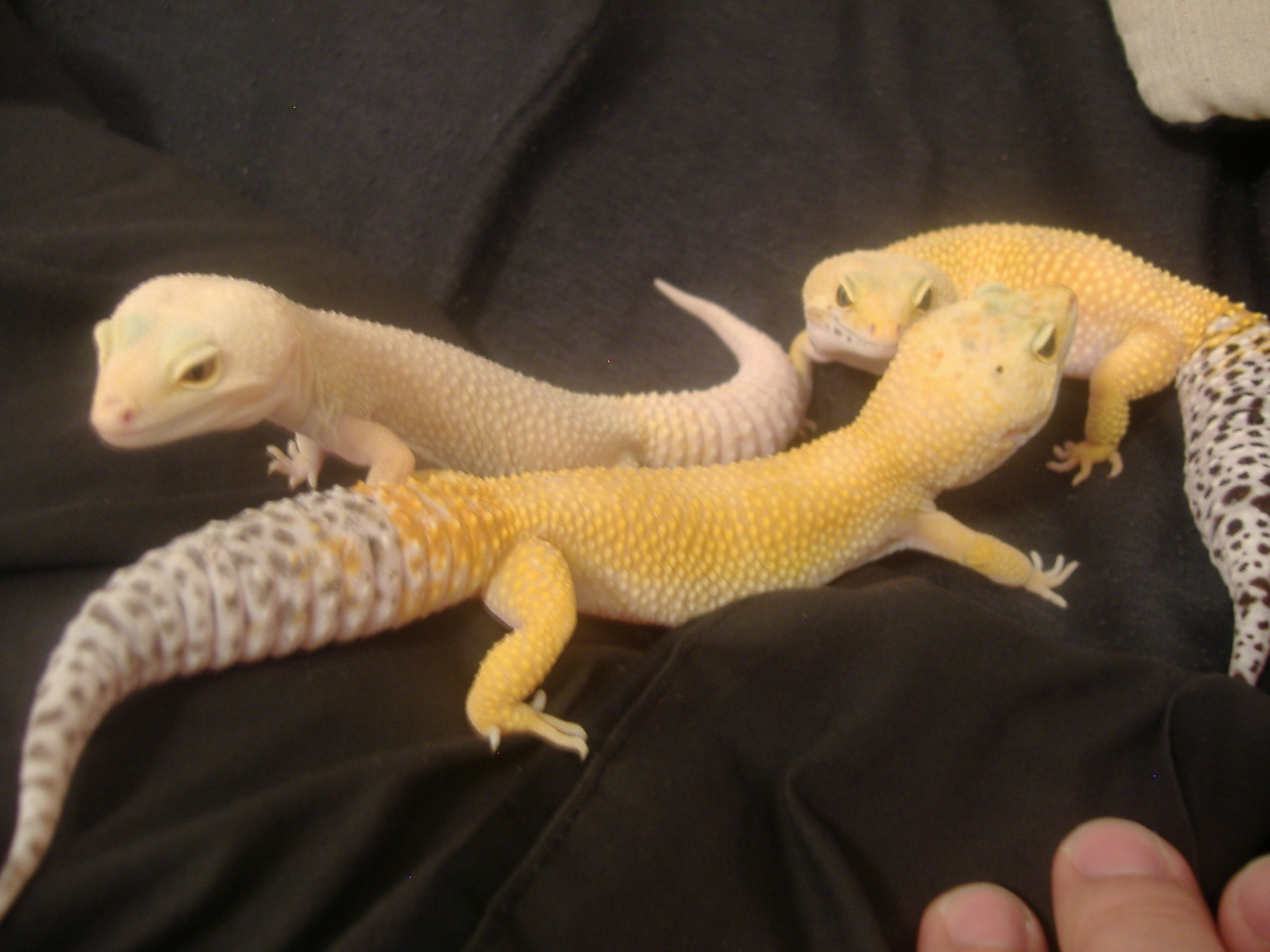

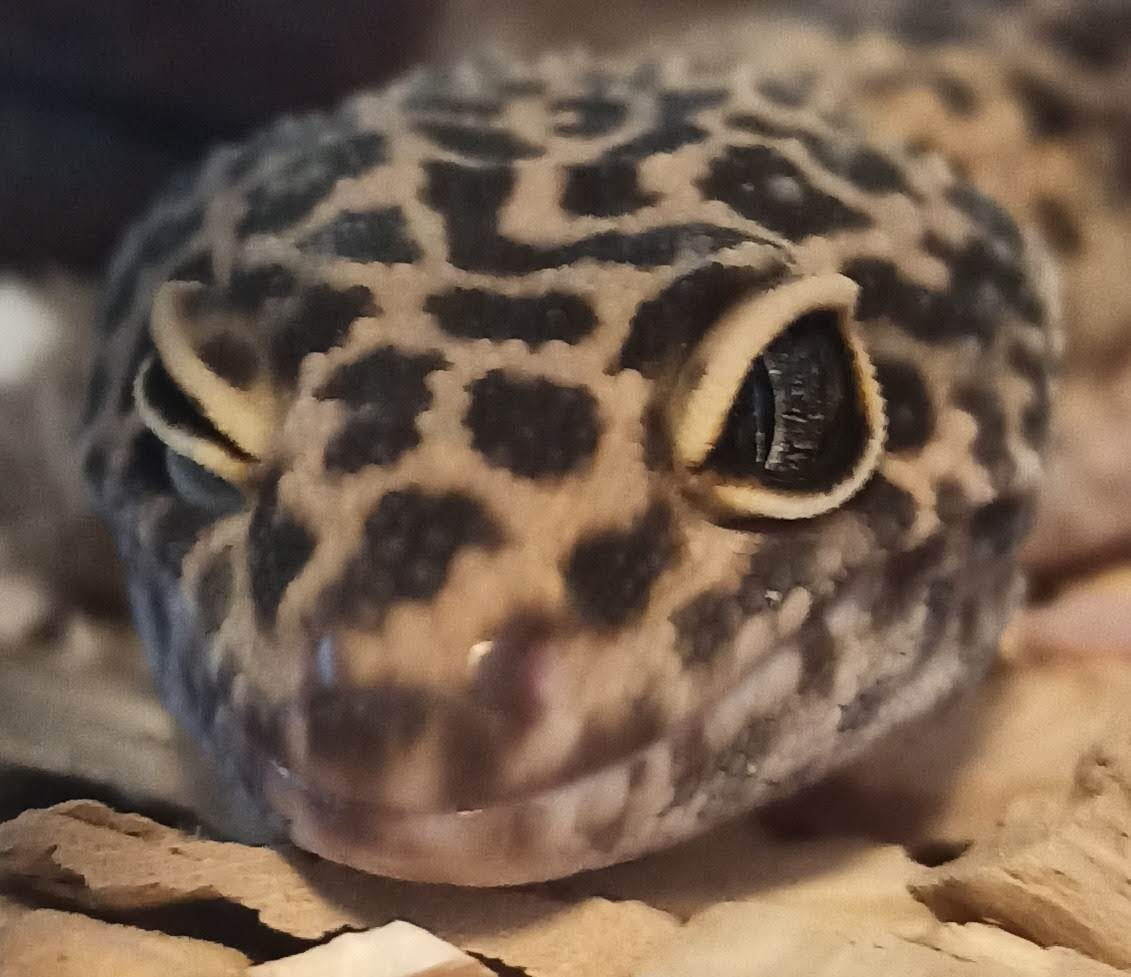

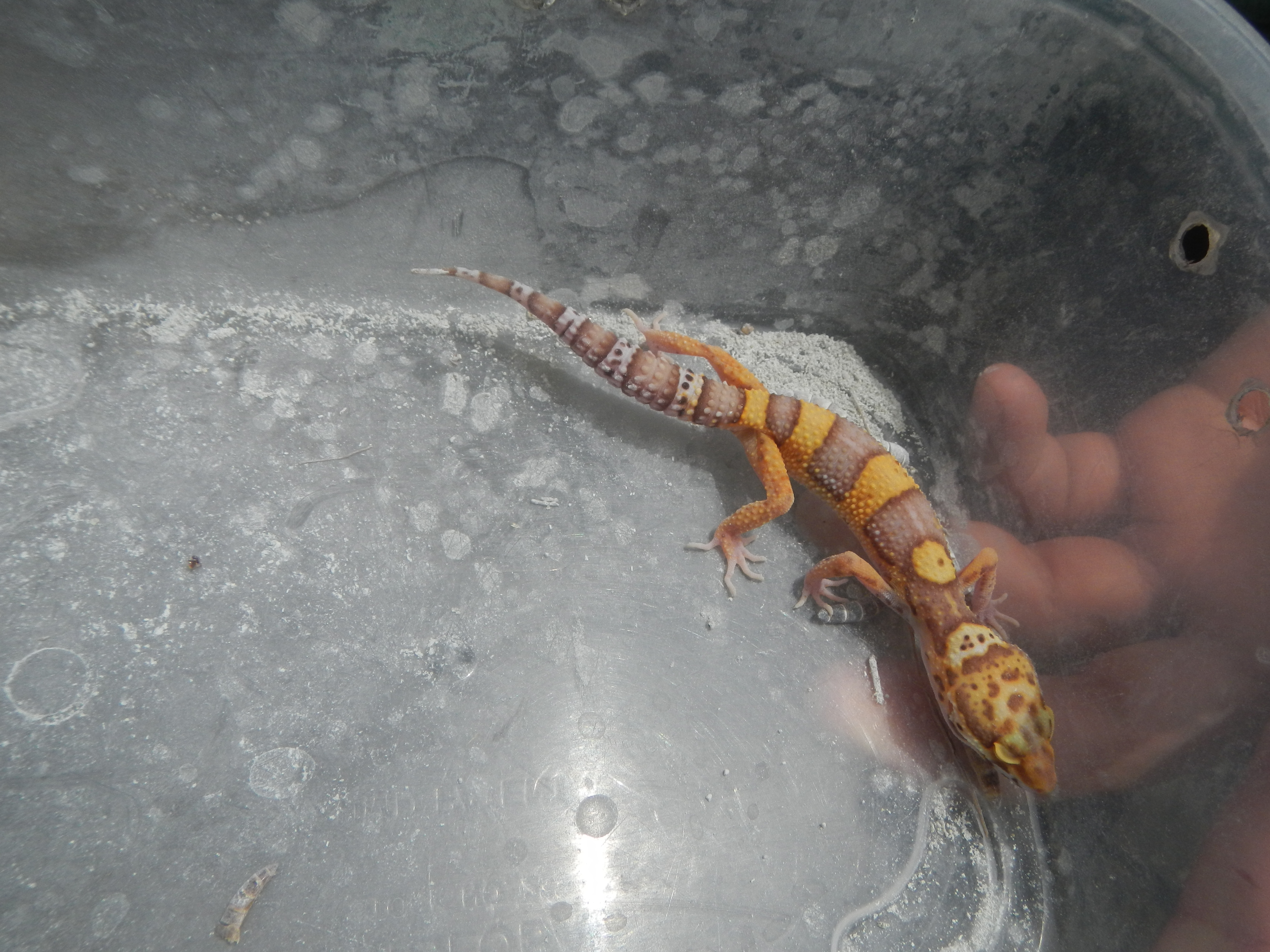

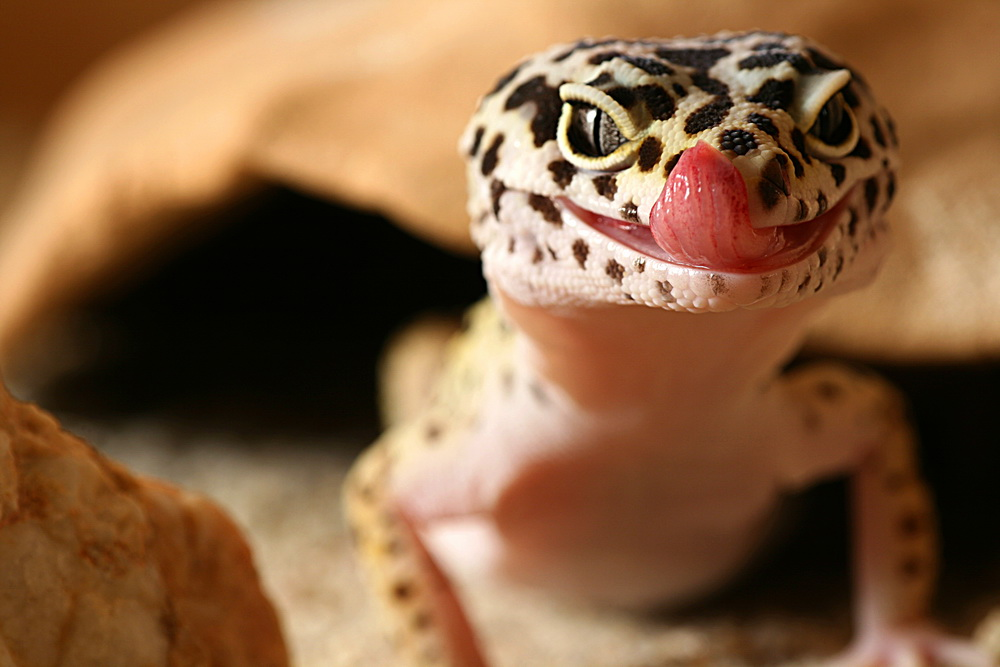

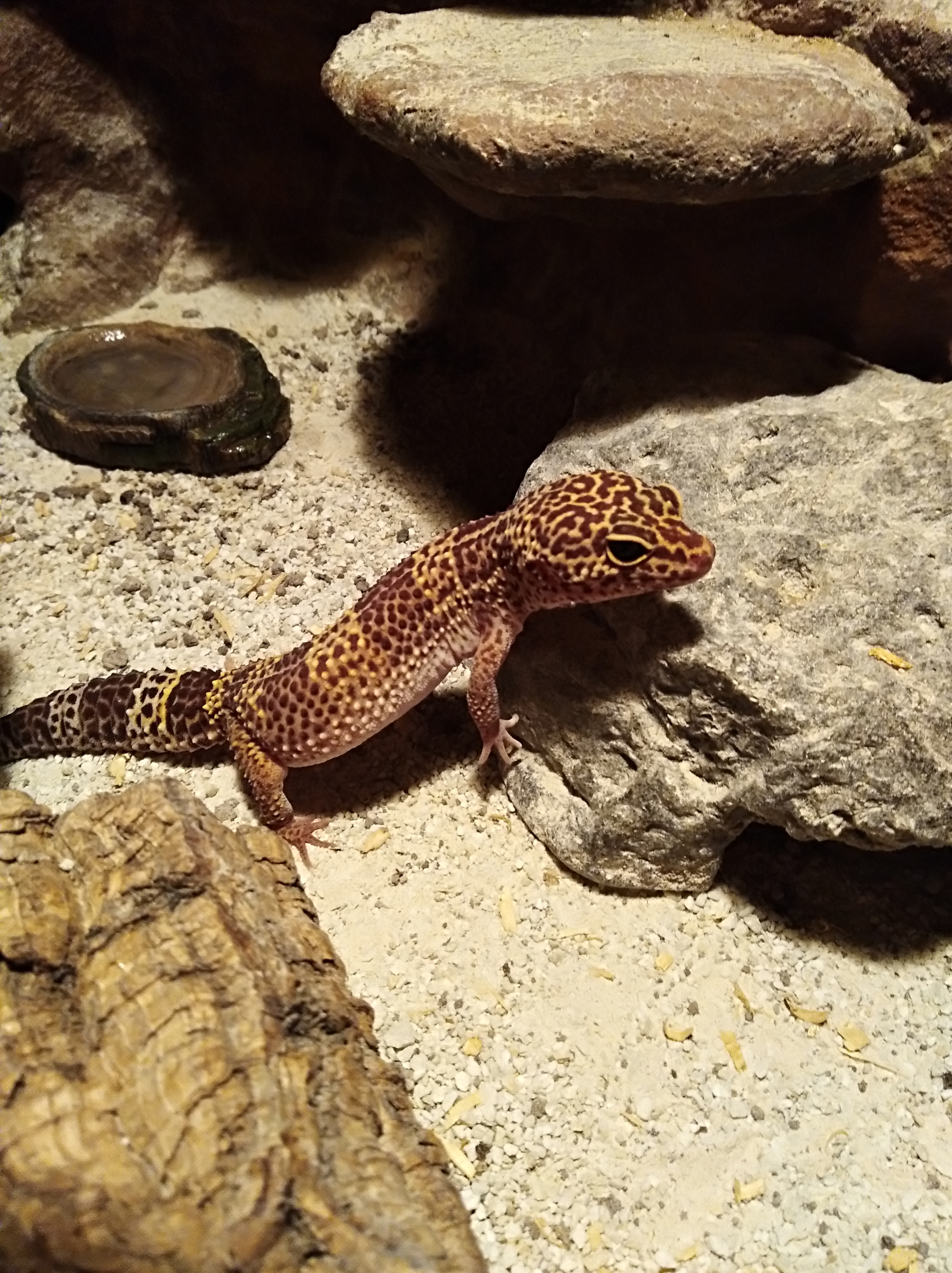

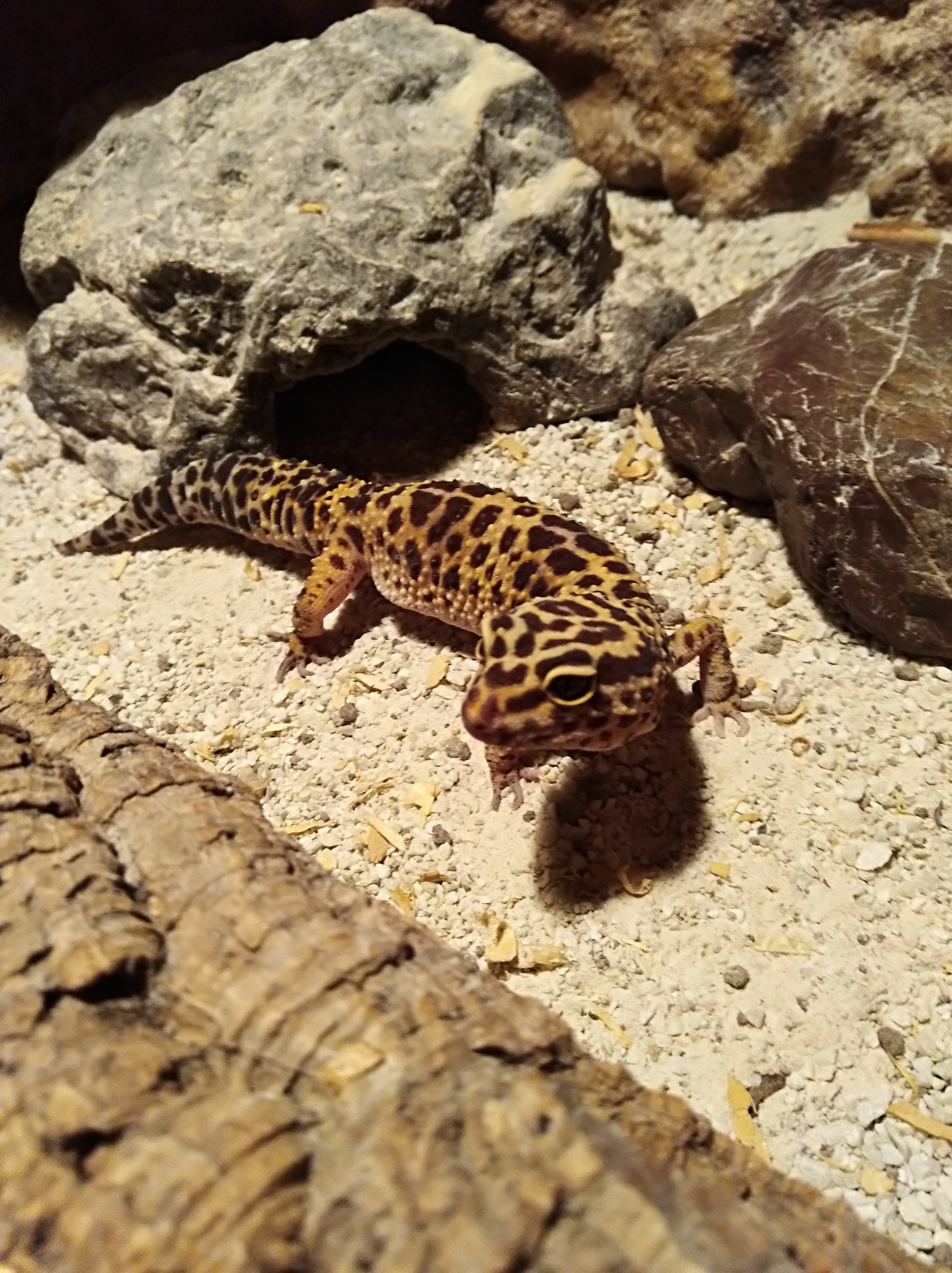

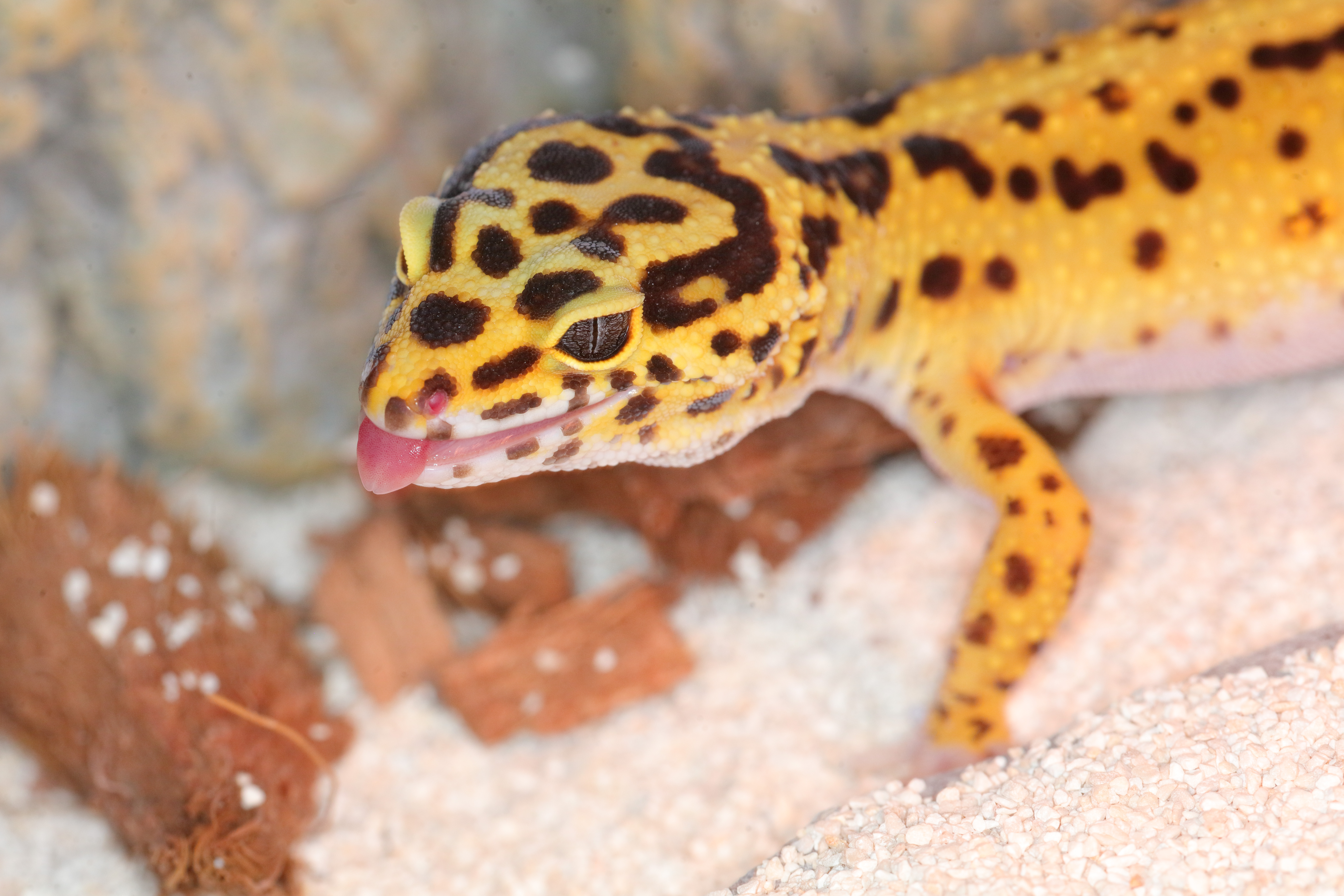

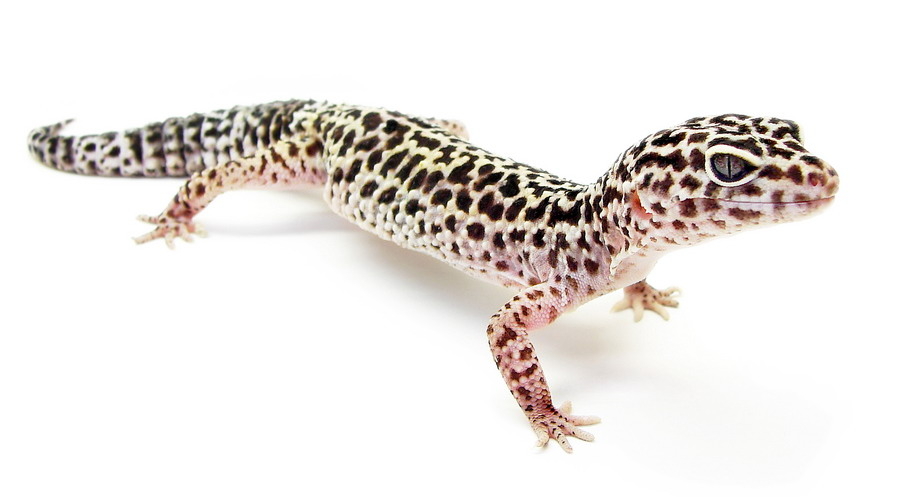

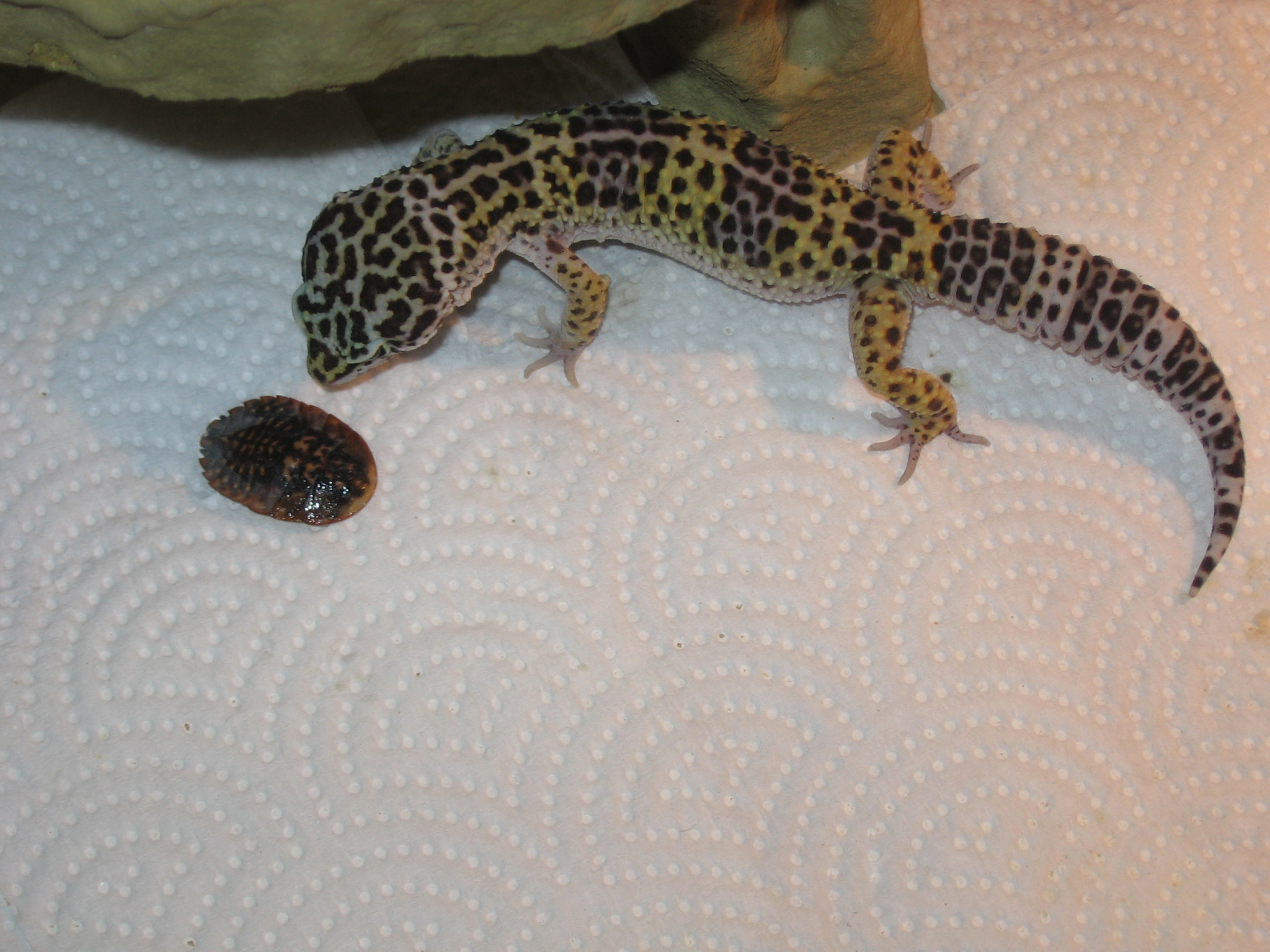

== See also ==
- African fat-tailed gecko
- Chinese cave gecko
