= Yekaterina Sinyavina =

Russian composer

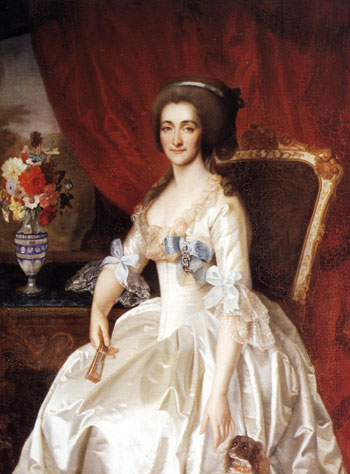
Catherine Vorontsova (Senyavina)

Yekaterina Alexeyevna Senyavina (1761–1784) was a Russian composer and pianist. In 1781, at the court of Catherine II she was the harpsichordist for what was probably the first performance of a harpsichord concerto by Giovanni Paisiello. She composed numerous short instrumental and keyboard pieces for private court occasions. Her harpsichord sonatas with violin accompaniment, now lost, are among the earliest known examples of keyboard sonatas by a composer of Russian origin. She served as a lady-in-waiting and composer at the court, married Count Simon Romanovich Vorontsov and died in Pisa.
