= Gavrila Derzhavin =

Russian poet (1743–1816)

Gavrila Romanovich Derzhavin
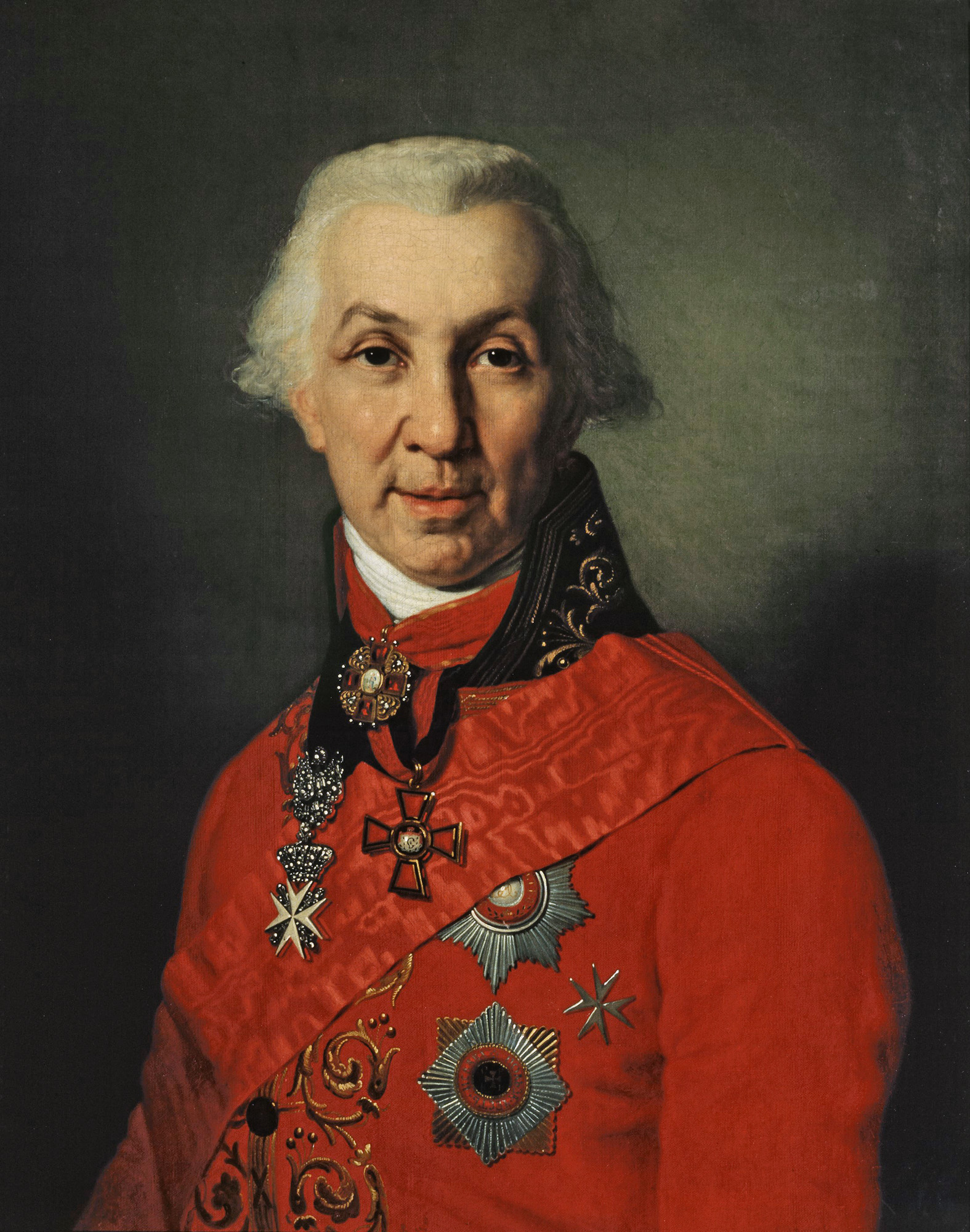
- Portrait by Vladimir Borovikovsky, 1811
- Born: 14 July 1743 Laishevsky Uyezd, Kazan Governorate, Russian Empire
- Died: 20 July 1816 (aged 73) Zvanka manor, Novgorod Governorate, Russian Empire
- Occupation: Poet, statesman
- Period: Neoclassicism

Gavriil (Gavrila) Romanovich Derzhavin (Russian: Гаврии́л (Гаври́ла) Рома́нович Держа́вин, IPA: [ɡɐˈvrilə rɐˈmanəvʲɪtɕ dʲɪrˈʐavʲɪn]; 14 July 1743 – 20 July 1816) was one of the most highly esteemed Russian poets before Alexander Pushkin, as well as a statesman. Although his works are traditionally considered literary classicism, his best verse is rich with antitheses and conflicting sounds in a way reminiscent of John Donne and other metaphysical poets.

== Biography ==
=== Early life and family ===
Derzhavin was born in the Kazan Governorate into a landed family of impoverished Russian nobility. His family descended from a 15th-century Tatar nobleman named Morza Bagrim, who converted to Christianity and became a vassal of Grand Prince Vasily II of Moscow. Bagrim was rewarded with lands for his service to the prince, and from him descended noble families of Narbekov, Akinfov and Keglev (or Teglev).

A member of the Narbekov family, who received the nickname Derzhava (Russian for "orb" or "power"), was the patriarch of the Derzhavin family. The Derzhavins once held profitable estates along the Myosha River, about 25 miles (40 km) from the capital city of Kazan, but over time they were divided, sold or mortgaged. By the time Gavrila Derzhavin's father, Roman Nikolayevich Derzhavin, was born in 1706, he stood to inherit only a few parcels of land, occupied by few peasants. Roman joined the military and in 1742, at age 36, he married a widowed distant relative Fyokla Andreyevna Gorina (née Kozlova). She was from a similar background and also possessed a few scattered estates. The estates were the source of constant lawsuits, fights and feuds with neighbors, sometimes resulting in violence.

Derzhavin was born nearly nine months after his parents were wed, but the location of his birth remains a point of dispute. Derzhavin considered himself a native of Kazan—which proudly proclaims itself as the city of his birth—but he was possibly born at one of his family's estates in Sokury or Karmachi, in Laishevsky County. The Laishevsky District is informally known as the Derzhavinsky District because of its association with Derzhavin. He was named Gavriil (Russian for Gabriel), as his birth was 10 days before the Synaxis of the Archangel Gabriel, celebrated on 13 July in Slavic Orthodoxy. He was a sickly child, and his parents followed the traditional practice of the era and "baked the baby" (perepekaniye rebyonka)—an ancient ceremony in which sickly or premature babies are placed on a bread peel and put in and out of the oven three times.

Derzhavin's father was transferred to Yaransk and then Stavropol. Two more children were born, a boy and a girl, although the latter died young.

=== Education ===
As members of the nobility, albeit minor, the Derzhavins were required to educate their children, but options were limited given their poverty and the few educational institutions in Russia at the time. Male members of the nobility were expected to enter government roles as civil servants or military officers at age 20. Nobility unable to send their children to one of the three educational institutions were given a waiver to educate their children at home, but the children were given examinations at 7, 12 and 16 to inspect their progress. Known as Ganyushka, Gavrila's education began at age 3 when he was taught to read and write by local churchmen (as his mother was essentially illiterate). When he was 8, the family was sent to Orenburg near present-day Kazakhstan. The Russian Empire, eager to extend its reach, sent convicts to Orenburg to construct the city. A German named Joseph Rose opened a coeducational school to instruct the children of the nobility. Rose, in addition to being a criminal, had no formal education and was only able to instruct the children in the German language, which was then the most desirable language among the enlightened class in Russia.

When Gavrila was 10, the Derzhavins moved back to their estates in Kazan after two years in Orenburg. In the fall of 1753, he made his first trip to Moscow. Roman Derzhavin, who was suffering from consumption, needed to formally apply for retirement in Moscow, and then planned to continue to Saint Petersburg to register his son for future enlistment as required. However, he was delayed in Moscow until early January; by the time he received his discharge, he had no money to continue the journey to Saint Petersburg. They were forced to return to Kazan, where his father died later that year. His father owned half the land in Sokury, which Gavrila inherited along with other estates in Laishevsky. However, they provided very little income and the neighbors continued to encroach on their lands, flooding their estates or simply seizing land for themselves. His mother, a penniless widow with no powerful relatives, was unable to get any redress in the courts and was snubbed by judges. Derzhavin later wrote that his "mother's suffering from injustice remained eternally etched on his heart." Nevertheless, his mother was able to hire two tutors to teach her sons geometry and arithmetic.

In 1758, a new school opened in Kazan, saving his mother the difficulty of sending him to Saint Petersburg. The grammar school offered instruction in Latin, French, German, and arithmetic, as well as dancing, fencing and music. The instruction quality was still poor overall, with no textbooks. The school also offered opportunities for the students to perform tragedies by Molière and Alexander Sumarokov. Derzhavin eventually excelled in geometry and was informed he would be joining the corps of engineers in Saint Petersburg. However, a bureaucratic mistake led to him being made a private in the Preobrazhensky Regiment, the bodyguards of the royal family.

=== Career ===
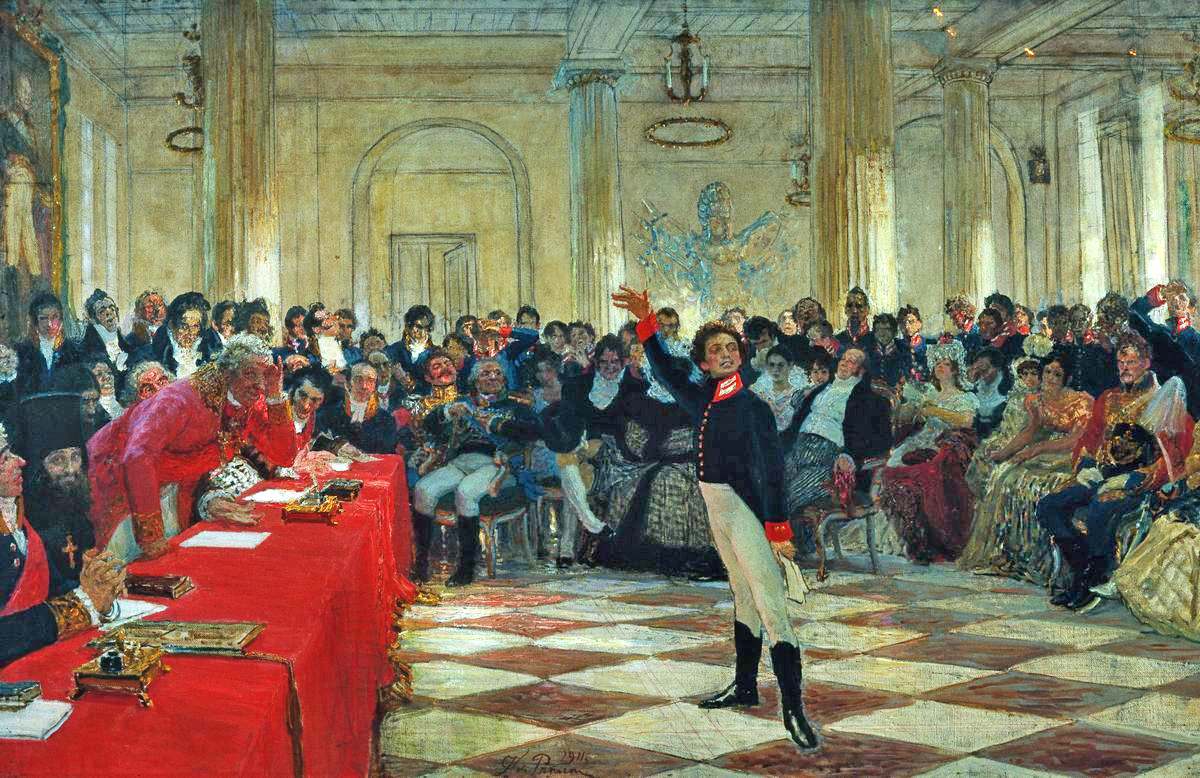
16-year-old Pushkin reciting his poem before old Derzhavin in the Tsarskoye Selo Lyceum (1911 painting by Ilya Repin).

In Saint Petersburg, Derzhavin rose from the ranks as a common soldier to the highest offices of state under Catherine the Great. He first impressed his commanders during Pugachev's Rebellion. Politically astute, his career advanced when he left the military service for civil service. He rose to the position of governor of Olonets (1784) and Tambov (1785), personal secretary to the Empress (1791), President of the College of Commerce (1794), and finally the Minister of Justice (1802).

In 1800, Derzhavin wrote the political work Opinion in response to a request by Emperor Paul I to investigate recent famines in Mogilev Governorate. In the Opinion, Derzhavin blamed Belarusian famines on the "mercenary trades" of Jews, who exploited peasants through leaseholding of estates and distilling of alcohol, as well as the indifference of the local magnates who allowed this exploitation to occur. In response to these issues, Derzhavin proposed a series of reforms to substantially restrict the freedoms of the magnates, abolish the Jewish Qahal, end the autonomy of the Russian Jewish community, and resettle Russian Jews in colonies along the Black Sea. The Opinion became an influential source of information during the early reign of Alexander I, who eventually implemented several of Derzhavin's suggested reforms in the 1804 Statute Concerning the Organization of the Jews.

He was dismissed from his post in 1803 and spent much of the rest of his life in the country estate at Zvanka near Novgorod, writing idylls and anacreontic verse. At his Saint Petersburg house, he held monthly meetings of the conservative Lovers of the Russian Word society. He died in 1816 and was buried in the Khutyn Monastery near Zvanka, reburied by the Soviets in the Novgorod Kremlin, and then reinterred at Khutyn.

== Works ==
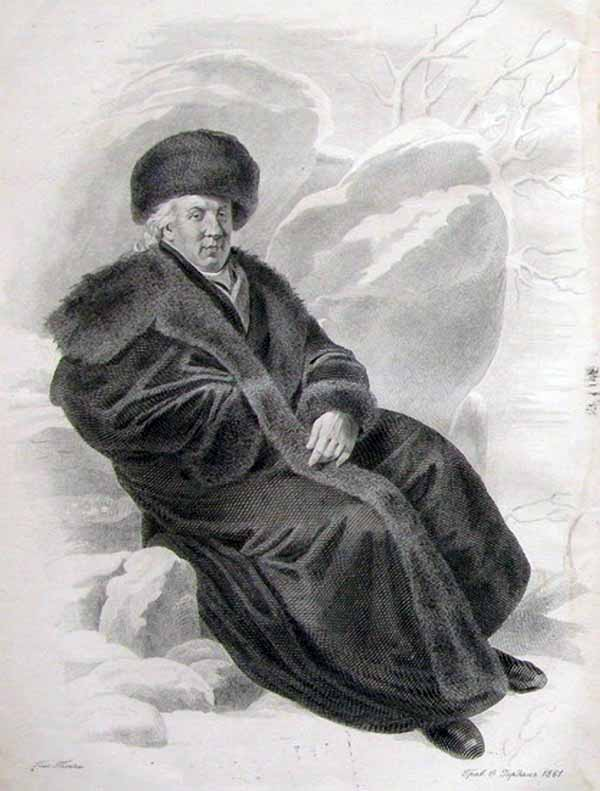
Engraving of Derzhavin by Fyodor Iordan, after Salvatore Tonci

Derzhavin is best remembered for his odes, dedicated to the Empress and other courtiers. He paid little attention to the prevailing system of genres, and many a time would fill an ode with elegiac, humorous, or satiric contents. In his grand ode to the Empress, for instance, he mentions searching for fleas in his wife's hair and compares his own poetry with lemonade.

Unlike other Classicist poets, Derzhavin found delight in carefully chosen details, such as a colour of wallpaper in his bedroom or a poetic inventory of his daily meal.

He believed that French was a language of harmony but that Russian was a language of conflict. Although he relished harmonious alliterations, sometimes he deliberately instrumented his verse with cacophonous effect.

Derzhavin's major odes were the impeccable "On the Death of Prince Meschersky" (1779); the playful "Ode to Felica" (1782); the lofty "God" (1785), which was translated into many European languages; "Waterfall" (1794), occasioned by the death of Prince Potemkin; and "Bullfinch" (1800), a poignant elegy on the death of his friend Suvorov.

Derzhavin also provided lyrics for the first national anthem of the Russian Empire, "Let the thunder of victory sound!"

== Influence ==
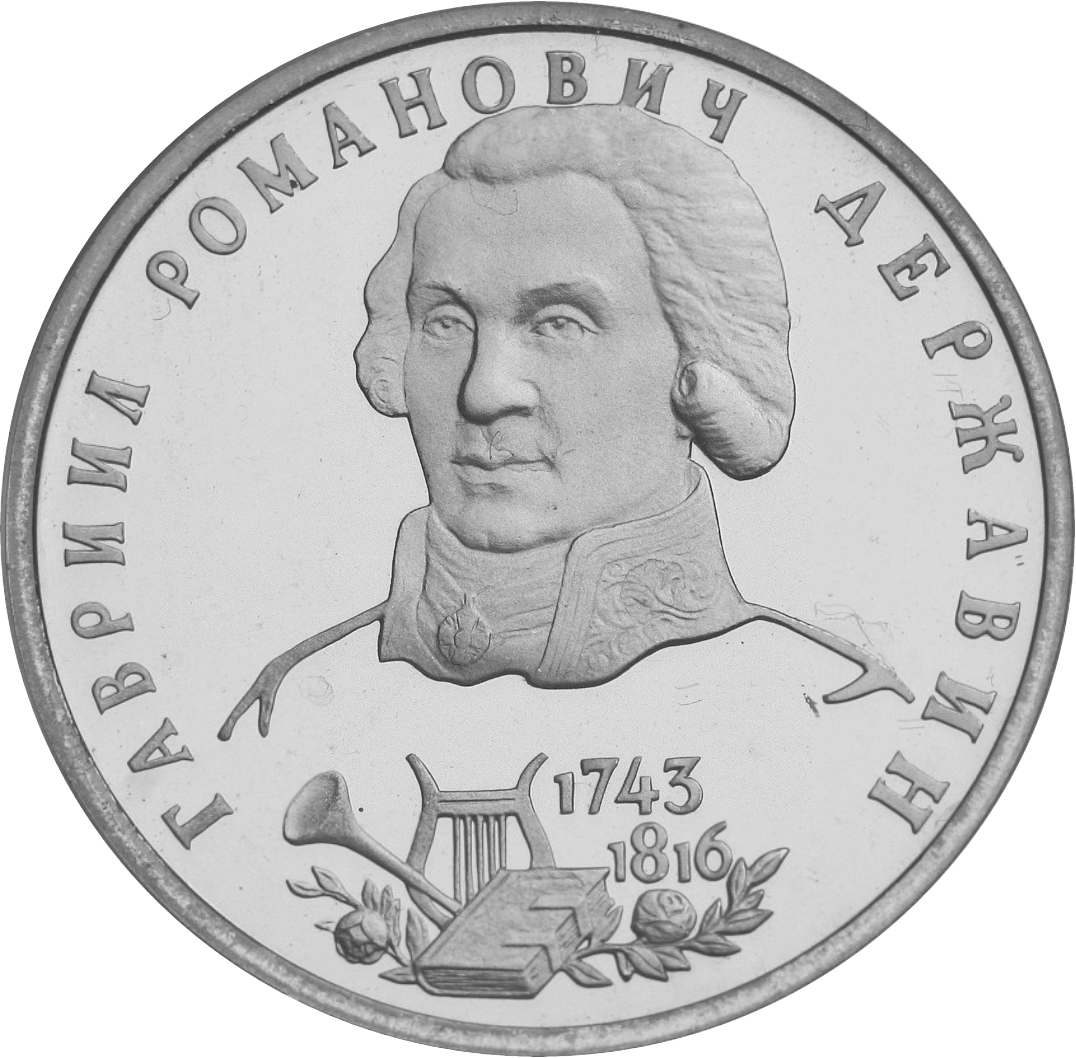
1993 Russian 1 rouble coin commemorating the 250th anniversary of Derzhavin's birth

According to D. S. Mirsky, "Derzhavin's poetry is a universe of amazing richness; its only drawback was that the great poet was of no use either as a master or as an example. He did nothing to raise the level of literary taste or to improve the literary language, and as for his poetical flights, it was obviously impossible to follow him into those giddy spheres." Nevertheless, Nikolai Nekrasov professed to follow Derzhavin rather than Pushkin, and Derzhavin's line of broken rhythms was continued by Marina Tsvetaeva in the 20th century. In 1995, Tambov State University was named after Gavrila Derzhavin.
