= Commemorative coins of Russia =

This is an incomplete list of commemorative coins of Russia.

== Silver 3 Rubles ==
- 1993 - ballerina

== Silver 25 rubles ==
- 1993 - ballerina
- 1994 - ballerina
- 3 rubles - silver - Monastery of Raifa - 2005
- 3 rubles - silver - Kazan train station - 2007
- 3 rubles - silver - Moscow subway station - 2005
- 3 rubles - silver - Russakov House of Culture - 2005
- 3 rubles - silver - St. Nicholas Cathedral - 2005
- 1 ruble - silver - Armed Forces - 2005
- 10 rubles - bi-metallic brass/cupronickel - Dorogobuzh - 2003
- 10 rubles - bi-metallic brass/cupronickel - Kasimov - 2003
- 10 rubles - bi-metallic brass/cupronickel - Pskov - 2003
- 10 rubles - bi-metallic brass/cupronickel - Murom - 2003
- 3 rubles - silver - Epiphany Cathedral - 2004
- 1 ruble - silver - great bustard - 2004
- 10 rubles - bi-metallic brass/cupronickel - Kem - 2004
- 10 rubles - bi-metallic brass/cupronickel - Ryazhsk - 2004
- 1 ruble - silver - rush toad - 2004
- 3 rubles - silver - 250 years Lomonosov University - 2005
- 50 rubles - gold - 60th anniversary of victory in World War II - 2005
- 3 rubles - bi-metallic brass/cupronickel - 300th anniversary Monetary Reform/Peter I - 2004
- 10 rubles - bi-metallic brass/cupronickel - Dmitrov - 2004
- 1 ruble - silver - Asiatic wild dog - 2005
- 10 rubles - base metal - Kaliningrad - 2005
- 10 rubles - bi-metallic brass/cupronickel - Kazan - 2005
- 3 rubles - silver - Kazan Opera & Ballet Theatre - 2005
- 2 rubles - silver - 100th anniversary birth of M. Sholokhov - 2005

== See also ==
- List of commemorative coins of Russia (1992)
- List of commemorative coins of Russia (1993)
- List of commemorative coins of Russia (1998)
- List of commemorative coins of Russia (2009)
- List of commemorative coins of the Soviet Union
