= Saint George the Victorious (coin) =

George the Victorious (gold)
- Russia
- Value: 50 rubles
- Mass: 7.89 g (0.2537 troy oz)
- Diameter: 22.60 mm (0.8898 in)
- Thickness: 1.60 mm (0.063 in)
- Edge: 134 corrugations
- Composition: 99.9% Au
- Years of minting: 2006–present
- Catalog number: 5216-0060

Obverse
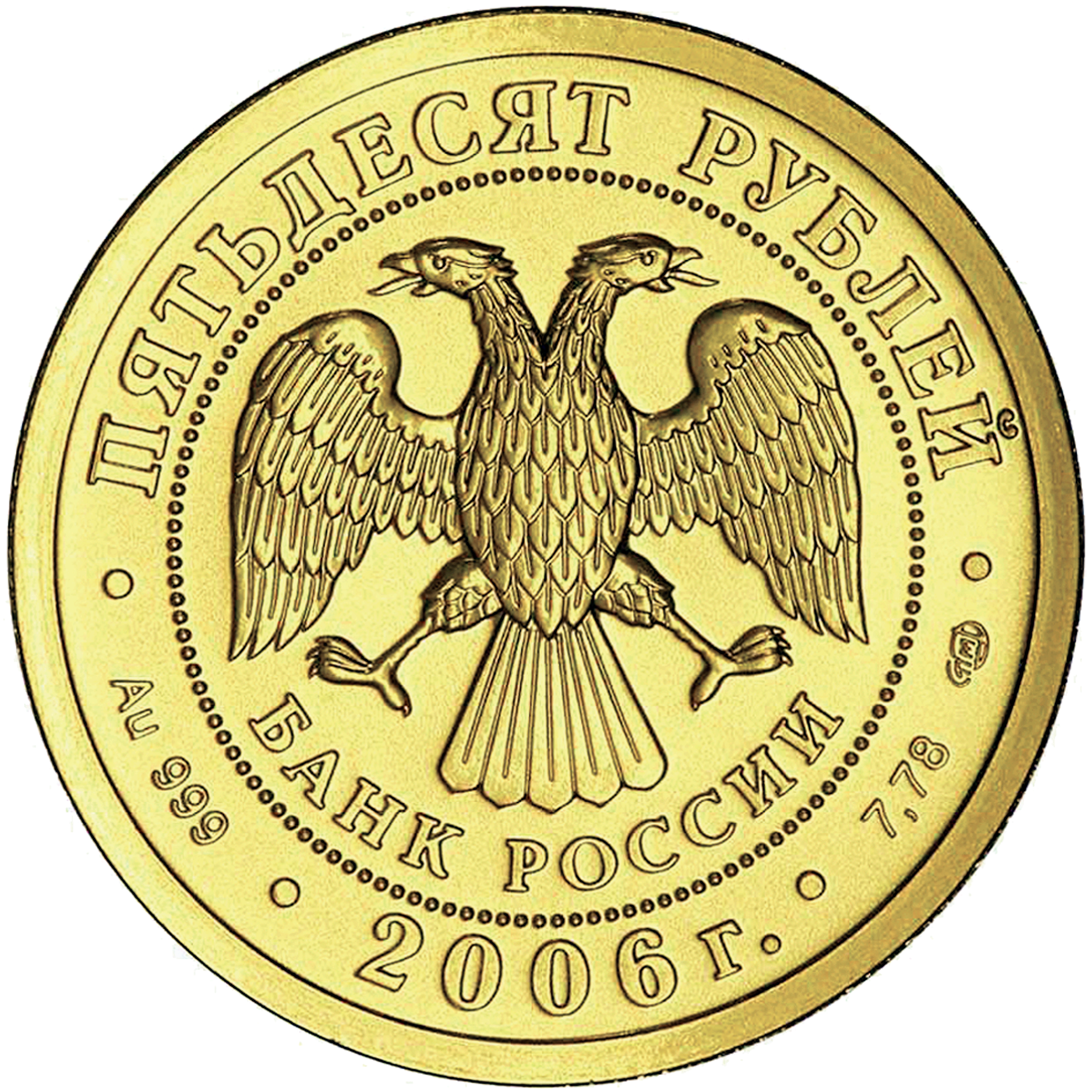
- Design: Double-headed eagle with wings down
- Designer: A. V. Baklanov
- Design discontinued: 2016
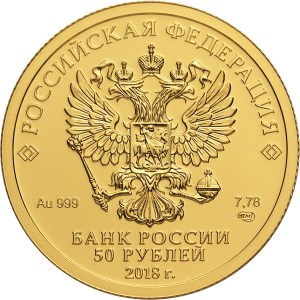
- Design: Coat of arms of Russia

Reverse
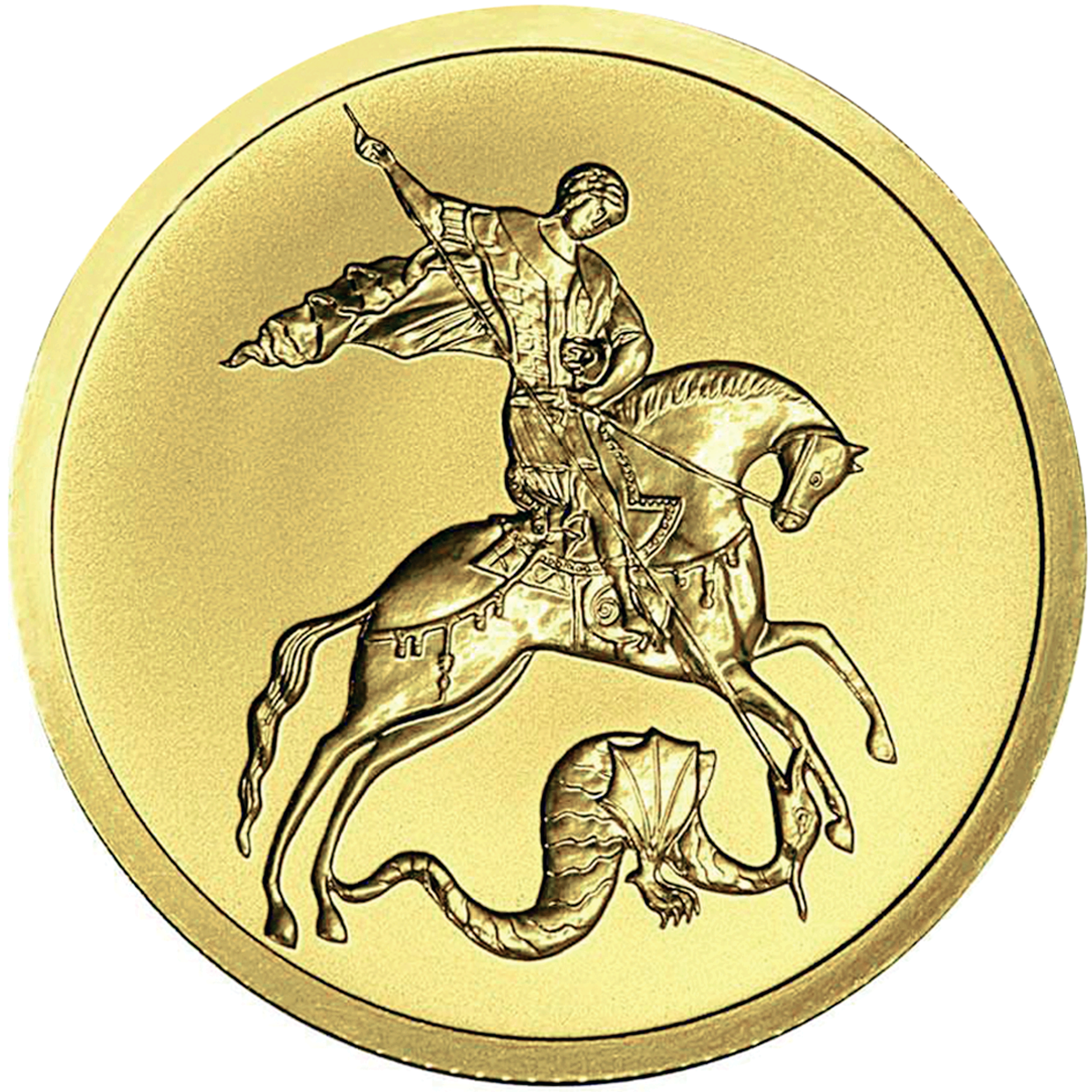
- Design: Saint George and the Dragon
- Designer: A. V. Baklanov

The Russian George the Victorious (Russian: монета Георгий Победоносец) is a bullion coin issued in gold and silver by the Central Bank of Russia. Mintage began in 2006 with quarter-troy ounce (7.78g) gold coins with a face value of 50 rubles and later in 2009 a one-troy ounce silver coin was introduced with a face value of 3 rubles. Since then, tenth, half, and one-troy ounce gold coins have been minted.

== Background ==
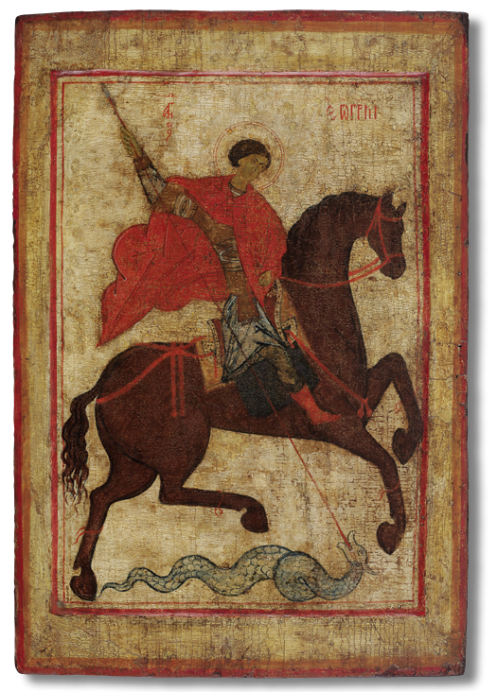
14th-century icon from Rostov (present day Russia) of Saint George slaying the dragon

Saint George was a Roman soldier and a member of the Praetorian Guard for Roman emperor Diocletian who died in 303 AD. He was sentenced to death for refusing to recant his Christian faith. He was a Great Martyr for the Eastern Orthodox Church and a highly revered saint in both the Western and Eastern Christian churches. He is the patron saint for Moscow, England, Georgia, and Ethiopia. The legend of Saint George and the Dragon tells the story of Saint George slaying a dragon and saving a princess that was going to be sacrificed to the dragon. Images and sculptures of the legend have been produced since at least the 11th century.

The reverses of the coins have an image of Saint George slaying the dragon, as does the British sovereign coin.

== Design ==
The coin was designed and sculpted by A. V. Baklanov and minted at the Saint Petersburg Mint and the Moscow Mint. The 2006-2016 obverse features the emblem of the Central Bank of Russia—a double-headed eagle with wings down. This emblem was the same one used by the Russian Republic in 1917. Both obverses are inscribed with "БАНК РОССИИ" (Bank of Russia), "ПЯТЬДЕСЯТ РУБЛЕЙ" (Fifty rubles), indications of the precious metal content and its fineness, and the year of issue followed by the mint mark. M is the mint mark for the Moscow Mint and C-П is for the St. Petersburg Mint. From 2017 forward, The double-headed eagle version was replaced with the current Coat of arms of Russia. The top of the coin is inscribed with "РОССИЙСКАЯ ФЕДЕРАЦИЯ" (Russian Federation). This version of the obverse was designed by E. V. Kramskaya.

== Gold ==
Gold George the Victorious coins were first issued on February 1, 2006.

Year	Mintage
2006	150,000
2007	500,000
2008	630,000
2009	1,500,000
2010	640,000
2012	500,000
2014	300,000
2015	30,000
2018	150,000

== Gold in proof quality ==
In August 2012, the Central Bank of the Russian Federation issued two special coins under "Saint George the Victorious" title. One coin has denomination "50 rubles" minted in 99.9% purity, and contains not less than 7.78 grams of fine gold. Unlike traditional 50 rubles Saint George the Victorious, the coin is minted in proof quality. Another coin has "100 rubles" denomination, features 99.9% purity, contains not less than 15.55 gram of fine gold. The coin has the same design as 50 rubles Saint George the Victorious coins (except denomination on the obverse) but greater diameter and thickness. There are 240 corrugations on the edge of the coin (134 corrugations are on the edge of 50 rubles coins). The coin is also minted in proof quality.

Higher prices (10-20% over uncirculated competitors of the same gold content), low mintages (10 thousand pieces of each denomination were issued) and a special care of proof coin handling turn Gold Saint George the Victorious in proof quality coins into numismatic items (commemorative coins) rather than means of a straightforward investment in gold coins.

== Silver ==
George the Victorious (silver)
- Russia
- Value: 3 rubles
- Mass: 31.1 g (1.00 troy oz)
- Diameter: 39 mm (1.54 in)
- Thickness: 3.10 mm (0.122 in)
- Edge: 300 corrugations
- Composition: 99.9% Ag
- Years of minting: 2009–present
- Catalog number: 5111-0178

Obverse
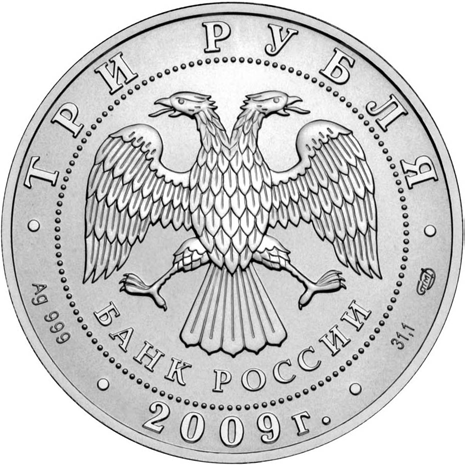
- Design: Double-headed eagle with wings down
- Designer: A. V. Baklanov
- Design discontinued: 2016
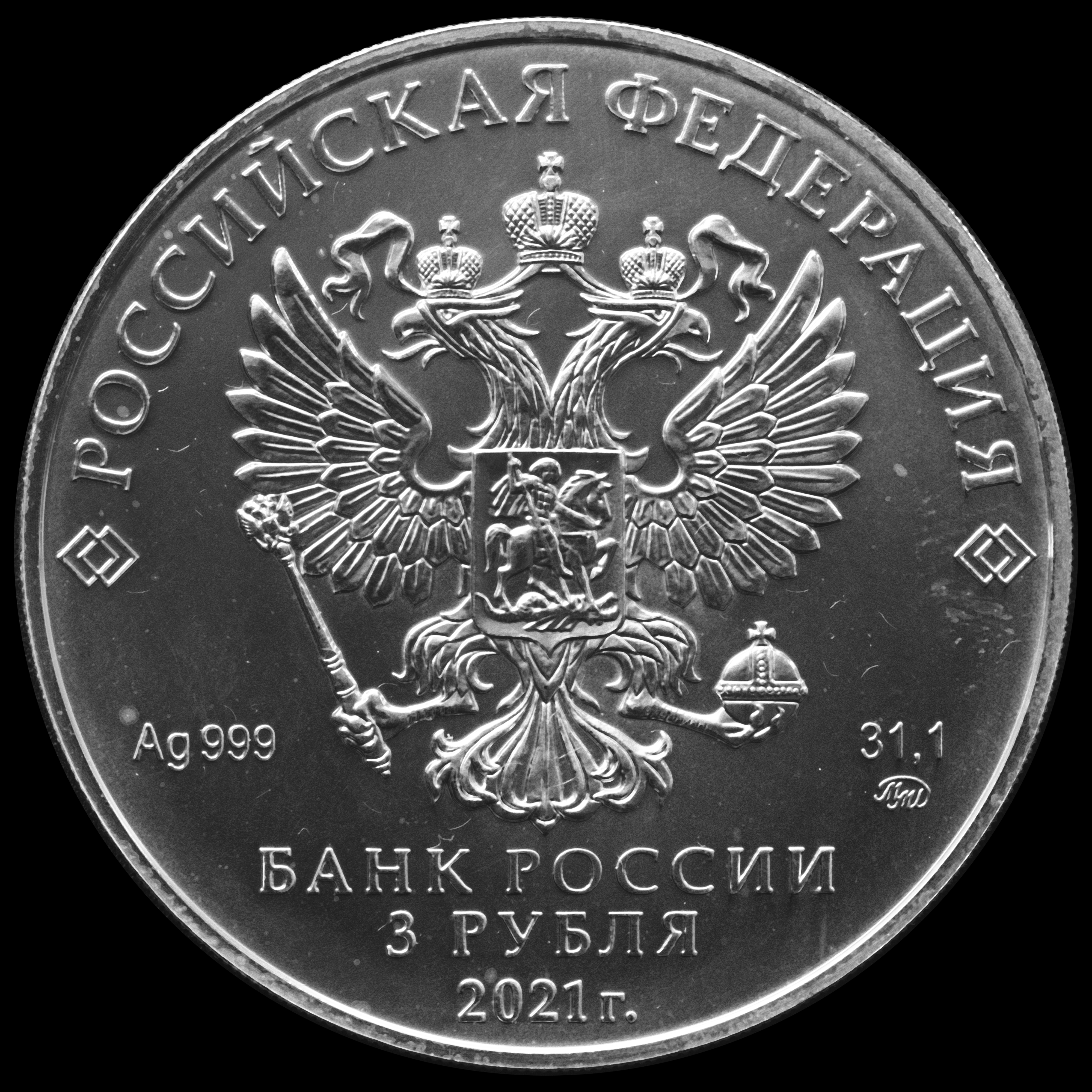
- Design: Coat of arms of Russia
- Designer: E.V. Kramskaya

Reverse
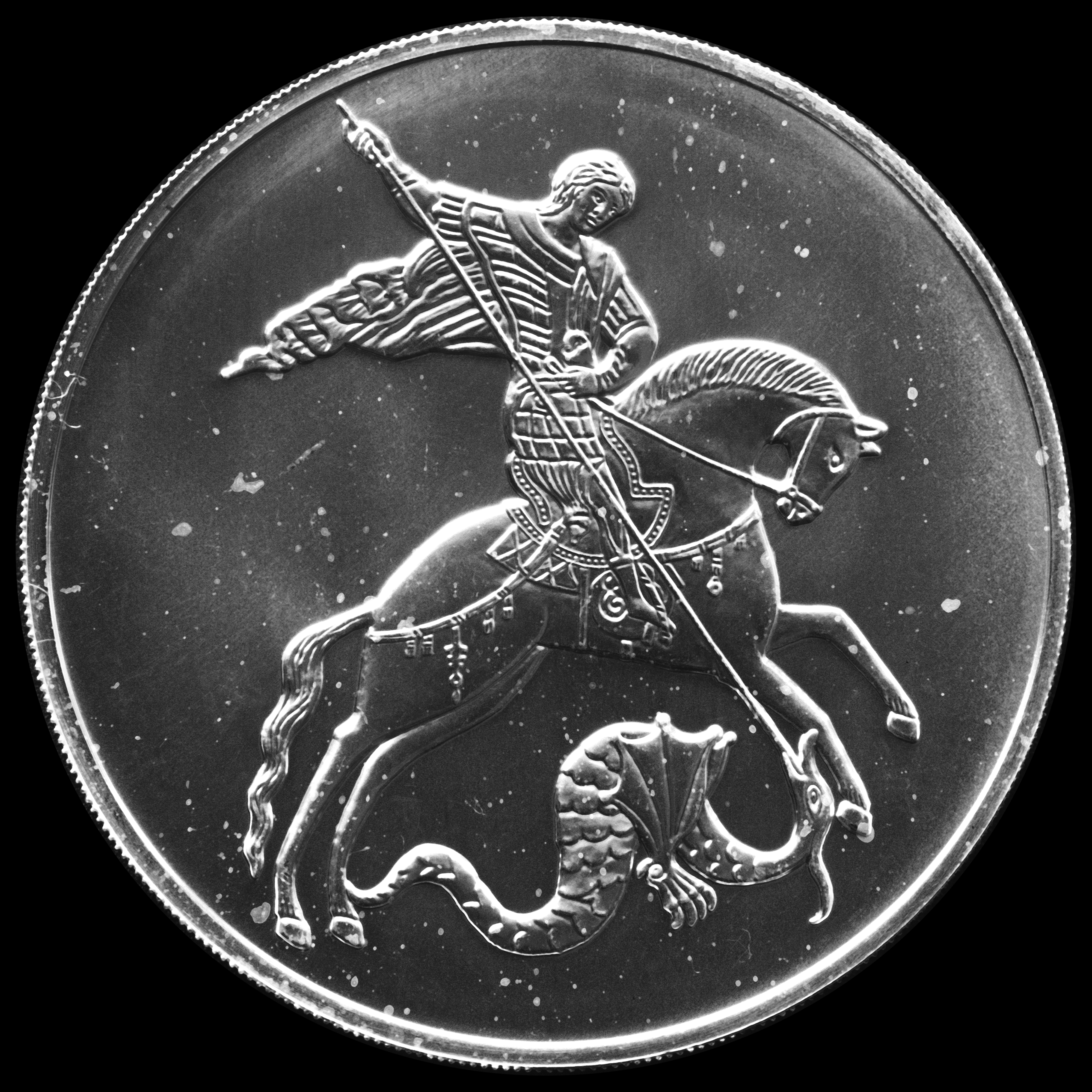
- Design: Saint George and the Dragon
- Designer: A. V. Baklanov

Silver George the Victorious coins were first issued on January 11, 2009.

Year	Mintage
2009	280,000
2010	500,000
2011	0
2012	0
2013	0
2014	0
2015	100,000
2016	18,205
2017	20,000
2018	150,000

== See also ==
- Bullion
- Bullion coins
- Gold as an investment
- Inflation hedge
- List of commemorative coins of Russia (2009)
- Silver as an investment
