= List of commemorative coins of Russia (1998) =

This is a list of commemorative coins issued by the Central Bank of Russia in 1998:

Commemorative coins issued by the Central Bank of Russia in 1998
| Name | Date of issue | Catalogue number | Nominal value | Total mintage | Image (front) | Image (reverse) |
Individual issues
| World Youth Games | 28 May 1998 | 5109-0030 | 1 ruble | 25,000 | | |
| World Youth Games | 28 May 1998 | 5109-0031 | 1 ruble | 25,000 | | |
| World Youth Games | 28 May 1998 | 5109-0032 | 1 ruble | 25,000 | | |
| World Youth Games | 28 May 1998 | 5109-0033 | 1 ruble | 25,000 | | |
| World Youth Games | 28 May 1998 | 5109-0034 | 1 ruble | 25,000 | | |
| World Youth Games | 28 May 1998 | 5109-0035 | 1 ruble | 25,000 | | |
| Year of Human Rights in the Russian Federation | 10 December 1998 | 5111-0064 | 3 rubles | 15,000 | | |
Series: Prominent personalities of Russia
| 135th anniversary of the birth of K.S. Stanislavski | 19 January 1998 | 5110-0021 | 2 rubles | 15,000 | | |
| 135th anniversary of the birth of K.S. Stanislavski | 19 January 1998 | 5110-0022 | 2 rubles | 15,000 | | |
| 100th anniversary of the birth of S.M. Eisenstein | 23 January 1998 | 5110-0023 | 2 rubles | 15,000 | | |
| 100th anniversary of the birth of S.M. Eisenstein | 23 January 1998 | 5110-0024 | 2 rubles | 15,000 | | |
| 150th anniversary of the birth of V.M.Vasnetsov | 14 May 1998 | 5110-0025 | 2 rubles | 15,000 | | |
| 150th anniversary of the birth of V.M.Vasnetsov | 14 May 1998 | 5110-0026 | 2 rubles | 15,000 | | |
Series: Red Data Book
| Japanese skink | 29 September 1998 | 5109-0036 | 1 ruble | 15,000 | | |
| Laptev Sea walrus | 29 September 1998 | 5109-0037 | 1 ruble | 15,000 | | |
| Emperor goose | 29 September 1998 | 5109-0038 | 1 ruble | 15,000 | | |
Series: Architectural monuments of Russia
| 100th anniversary of the Russian Museum | 23 June 1998 | 5111-0058 | 3 rubles | 15,000 | | |
| 100th anniversary of the Russian Museum | 23 June 1998 | 5111-0059 | 3 rubles | 15,000 | | |
| 100th anniversary of the Russian Museum | 23 June 1998 | 5111-0060 | 3 rubles | 15,000 | | |
| 100th anniversary of the Russian Museum | 23 June 1998 | 5111-0061 | 3 rubles | 15,000 | | |
| Nilo Stolobenskaya Hermitage | 1 September 1998 | 5111-0062 | 3 rubles | 15,000 | | |
| Savvino-Storozhevsky Monastery | 26 November 1998 | 5111-0063 | 3 rubles | 5,000 | | |
