= Nil Stolobensky =

18th-century wooden sculpture of a saint

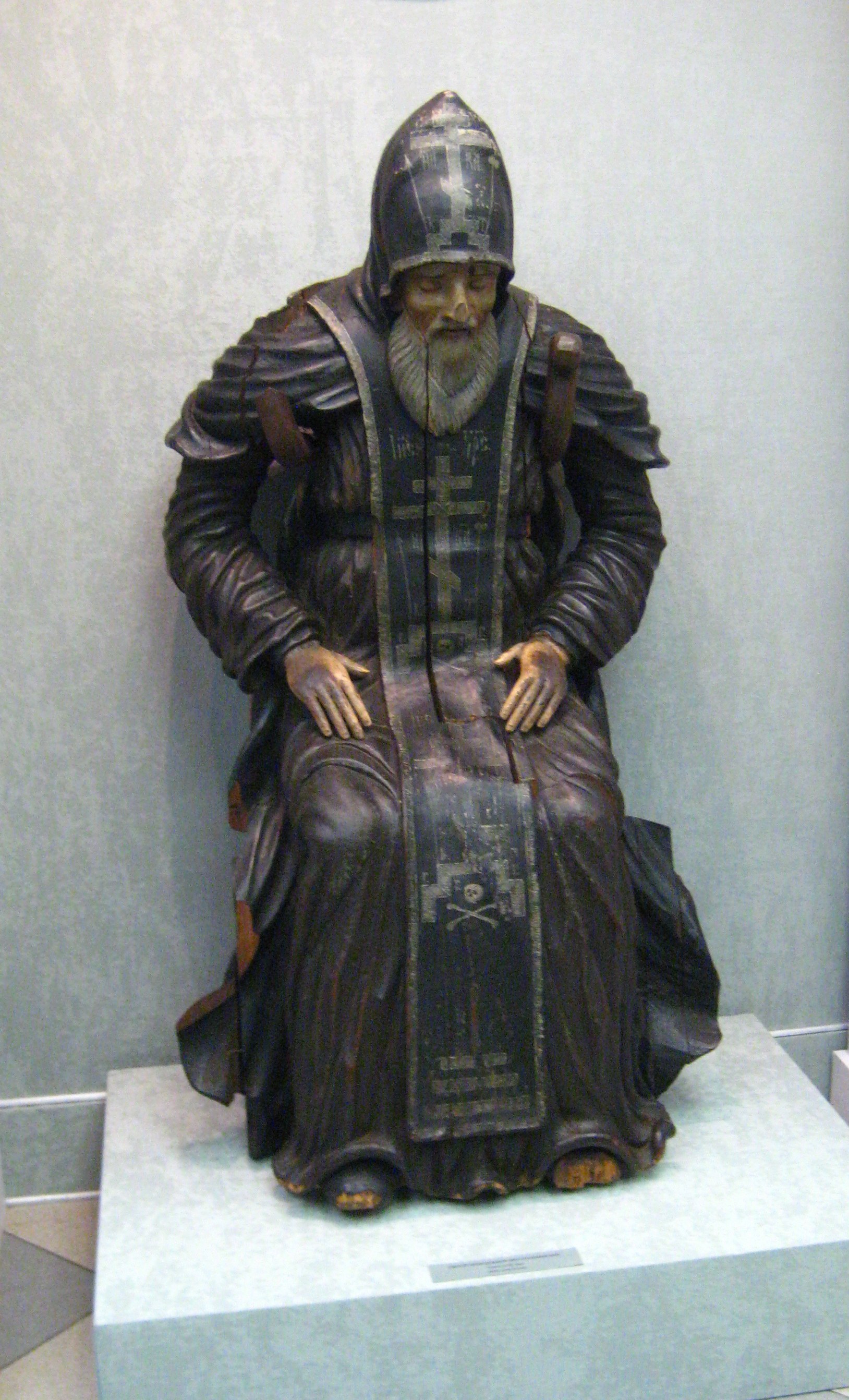
- Artist: Unknown master (possibly Kondratiy Semyonovich Konyagin)
- Year: 1770s–1780s
- Type: Sculpture
- Medium: Wood, Gesso, Drying oil
- Movement: Carving, Tempera
- Location: Museum "Heritage of Venerable Nil", Nilov-Stolobensky Monastery, Russia, Tver Oblast

Nil Stolobensky (Russian: Нил Столобенский) is a carved and painted wooden sculpture of the eponymous saint, currently housed in the Museum "Legacy of Saint Nil". It is believed to have been created in the 1770s–1780s. The sculptural image of the venerable saint was crafted for the Pokrovsky Church of John the Baptist in the Nilov Monastery, located on Stolobny Island and partially on the Svetlitsa peninsula, 10 km north of the city of Ostashkov, on Lake Seliger. The sculpture is made of wood using carving and tempera painting techniques, with gesso and linseed oil applied.

Tamara Barseghyan, head of the scientific-methodological and pedagogical work sector at the Andrey Rublev Museum of Ancient Russian Culture and Art, Doctor of Art History, suggested that the sculpture's author could be Kondraty Semyonovich Konyagin, a decorator who worked on the embellishment of churches in Ostashkov, Nilov Monastery, and Valaam Monastery. Philosopher Pavel Ivanov posited that the statue of Saint Nil Stolobensky's creation was influenced by local landowner Ivan Chelishchev, (Note: Ivan Sergeyevich Chelishchev (1707–1781)) an erudite man fluent in foreign languages, who served in Saint Petersburg and was a great enthusiast of theater and theatrical effects. Following a restoration in 2012, the sculpture is displayed in the Museum "Legacy of Saint Nil" at the Nilov Monastery. This museum holds the world's largest collection of images of the saint, with the allegedly miraculous sculpture occupying a central place in the exhibition.

== Description and origins ==
The sculpture of the saint is crafted from wood using carving and tempera painting techniques, with levkas and drying oil applied.

Doctor of Art History Tamara Barseghyan, in her article Miraculous sculptural image of venerable Nil Stolobensky", wrote that the iconographic sources for the sculpture were the Nil Stolobensky's Life and his earliest tomb icons, (Note: It is believed that the first icon of Nil Stolobensky was painted in 1595 by monks Job and Niphont of the Orshin Ascension Monastery, based on descriptions from elders who knew the saint 40 years earlier and remembered his appearance.) (Note: The article "Miraculous sculptural image of venerable Nil Stolobensky" reflects and builds on conclusions Tamara Barseghyan reached in her dissertation for the degree of Candidate of Art History.) dating back to the late 16th century. The Life describes the saint engaging in all-night vigils and prayers, constantly studying the Catechism, and opening his soul to the Lord. Day or night, Nil never allowed himself to lie down, even briefly, and in cases of extreme exhaustion, he remained standing, leaning on wooden hooks driven into the walls of his cell.

The Life portrays Nil as an ascetic, non-possessor, mystic, and hesychast, performing a hermitic feat. Barseghyan noted that the Life clarifies the sculpture's composition. Knowledge of hesychast prayer techniques explains the saint's stooped posture. An anonymous treatise, The Sacred Prayer and Attention Method, recommends: "Retiring to your silent cell and facing one corner… close the doors of the senses and elevate your mind above all vain and transient things. Then, resting your beard on your chest, direct your physical eyes along with your mind to the middle of your abdomen, that is, the navel, and restrain nasal breathing…" The sculpture's composition aligns with this advice: the saint's head is lowered, with his beard resting on his chest. He sits, bent forward, with his arms bent at the elbows resting on his knees. The sculptor depicted the saint's body hanging on crutch-like hooks. In some other sculptures, Nil Stolobensky is shown standing.

The saint's garments symbolize his monastic vows. Nil is depicted in a great schema, signifying the highest degree of monastic achievement. This attire helps the artist convey the spiritual essence of the image. He wears a mantle, a long sleeveless cloak symbolizing angelic wings. Beneath it, the sleeves of a podryasnik, the monk's undergarment, are visible. On his head is a koukoulion, worn by monks day and night, symbolizing innocence and childlike simplicity. The great schema kukul has a pointed top and is adorned with an eight-pointed cross on the front. Over the mantle, Nil wears an analav, a long cloth bearing the Cross of the Lord and the Passion of Jesus's elements. On his left hand hang prayer beads, used to count prayers and prostrations. Barseghyan noted the precise depiction of the vestments, which enhances the image's authenticity and sacred significance.

Barseghyan believed the sculpture captures Nil Stolobensky's features: "an elongated face with sunken cheeks, a sharp, straight, prominent nose, deeply set, half-closed eyes, and a long, wide, pointed beard".

Elements of monastic clothes
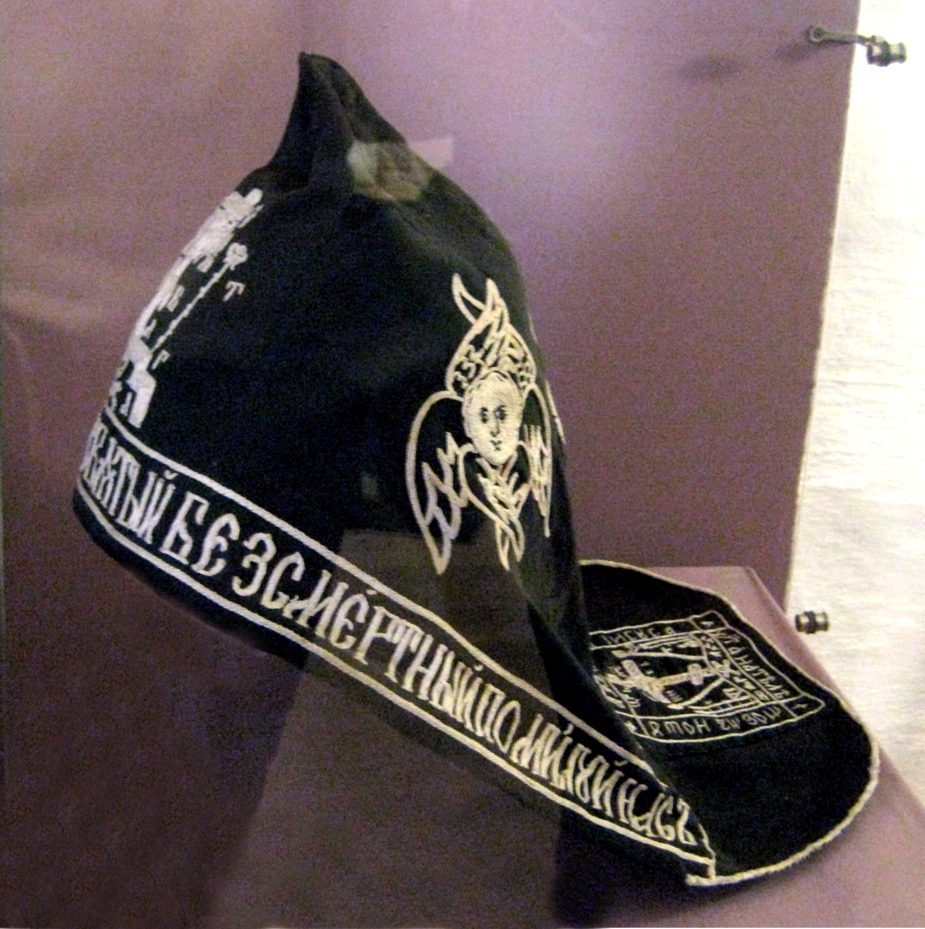
Black koukoulion

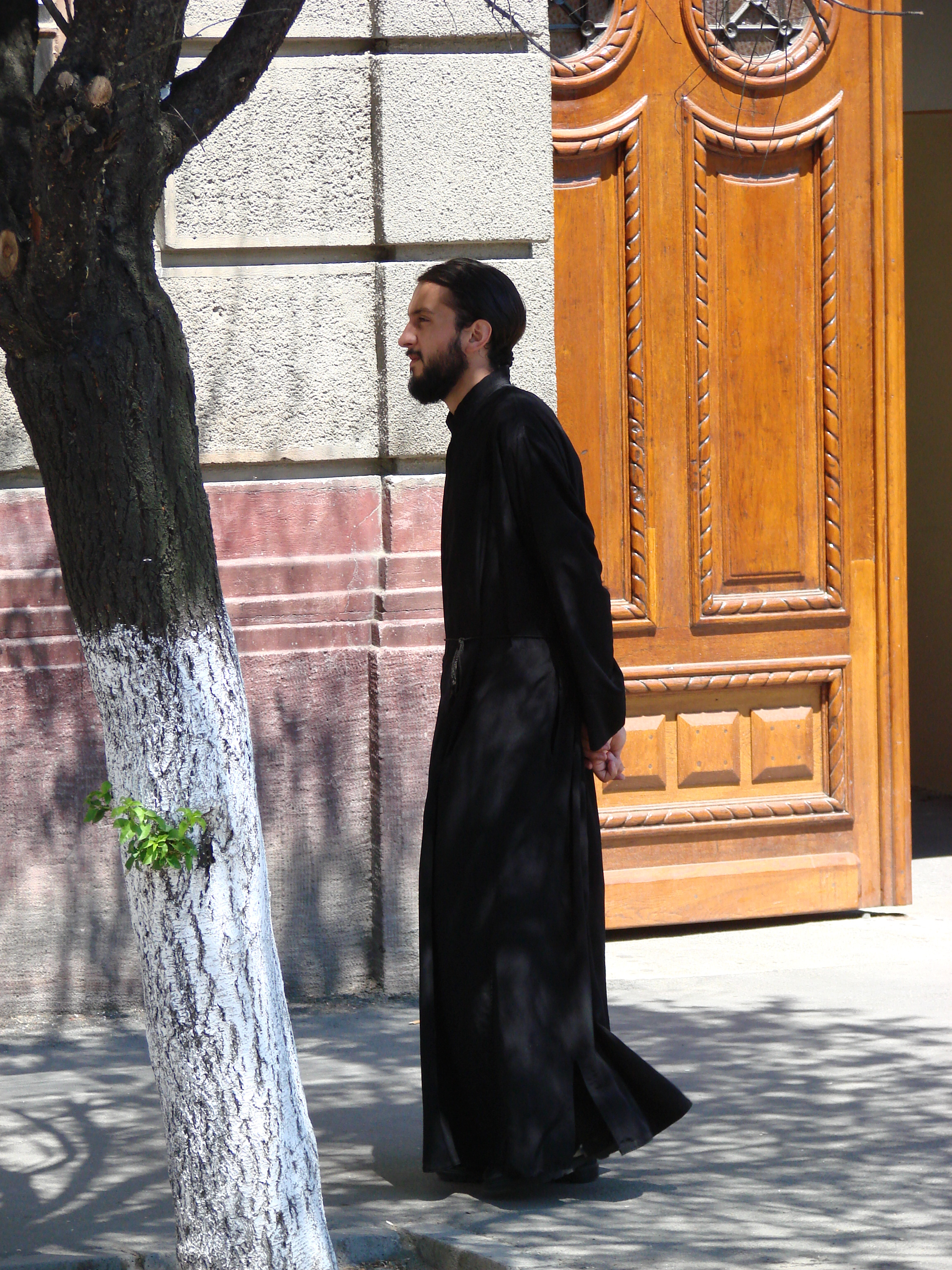
Monk in cassock

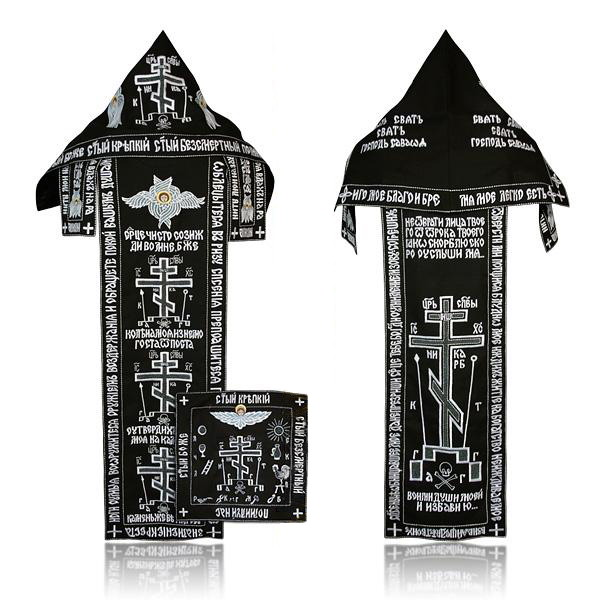
Monastic analav, front and back

== History ==
=== Sculpture from the Pokrovsky church and the tradition of crafting Nil Stolobensky images ===
The State Archive of Tver Oblast holds the Life of the Venerable and God-Bearing Father Nil Stolobensky, the Wonderworker, written in the early 19th century by a local cleric. (Note: This Life is unpublished. Tamara Barseghyan cited it from a manuscript in the State Archive of Tver Oblast: OR. F. 1409. Op. I. D. 1099. L. 19, 19 ob. "Life of the Venerable and God-Bearing Father Nil Stolobensky, the Wonderworker." Manuscript. Early 19th century.) It states that in the lower Pokrovsky Church of John the Baptist in the Nilov Monastery, at the site of the saint's cave, there is a carved image of the ascetic matching his age and legendary appearance, "from which those who approach with faith often receive healing". The church was built between 1777 and 1781. (Note: Entry for the Church of John the Baptist on the "Temples of Russia" website.) Based on this dating, Barseghyan considered this image the earliest sculptural depiction of Saint Nil, dated to the 1770s–1780s. She argued that the sculptural image gained widespread popularity in the 18th to early 20th centuries, and again after the monastery's revival in the 1990s, due to its veneration as miraculous. Barseghyan traced the origins of Nil Stolobensky's sculptural image to Novgorod art of the 15th–16th centuries, particularly the tops of sarcophagi of Varlaam Khutynsky (1500) and Anthony the Roman (1573). The abbot of Nilov Monastery, Archimandrite Vassian (Vladimir Ivanovich Shusta) (1928–2010), in his article Nil Stolobensky and His Monastery, dated the sculpture to the 19th century, not the 18th.

Art historian Lyudmila Kalmykova, in her book Folk Art of the Tver Land (1995), argued that long before the Nilov Monastery sculpture, folk craftsmen in villages near Ostashkov, as well as in Rzhevsky Uyezd, Zubtsovsky Uyezd, Staritsky Uyezd, and Vyshnevolotsky Uyezd, carved small Nil Stolobensky figurines in the 17th century. (Note: Drawing on his experience as a woodcarver, Viktor Gribkov-Maysky wrote that carving a small Nil Stolobensky sculpture was technically simple, achievable with three or four cuts, followed by shaping with a chisel and trimming with a special knife (kosyachok). The sculpture was painted black except for the face, hands, and beard, which were white or flesh-toned, often primed on early pieces. Crutches were painted dark brown, and the sculpture stood on a base with a canonical inscription.) Often, women performed this work. Nil was depicted seated, with his head bowed to his chest, leaning on wooden crutches, and his monastic attire painted black. These figures were made for pilgrims. Larger life-size sculptures were commissioned by individuals, churches, and chapels, adorned with crosses, icons, rings, earrings on colorful ribbons, artificial flowers, beads, pearls, and strips of colored fabric. Honored Artist of the Russian Federation Vladimir Desyatnikov also dated sculptural depictions of the saint to the 17th century, limiting their distribution to central and northern Russian provinces: Tver, Novgorod Governorate, Pskov Governorate, Smolensk Governorate, Yaroslavl Governorate, and Moscow Governorate. He noted the conventionality of the ascetic's image and the lack of portraiture, with small figures intended for pilgrims. Doctor of Art History Nikolay Sobolev in Russian Folk Wood Carving (1934) claimed that Nil Stolobensky images were not widely popular in Russia. By the pre-revolutionary period, only a few peasant families in Ostashkovsky Uyezd, Rzhevsky, and Zubtsovsky uyezds produced them, as the monastery monopolized their sale, requiring carvers to deliver all works to the monastery. Sobolev argued that this lack of competition and rigid tradition made the production "formulaic and uninteresting". (Note: Candidate of Art History Alexander Chekalov rated Nil Stolobensky sculptures poorly: "The composition is very concise, fitting into a monolithic wooden block with a clear silhouette and actively defined planes, exposing the material in energetic cuts, architecturally logical like a pyramid. Yet these artisanal carvings lack monumentality and plasticity. Their mass is lightly curved, joints lack drama, lines are somewhat fluid and sluggish, and details combine naturalism with exaggerated simplification. The plastic treatment of wood resembles late Zagorsk dolls".)

Art historian Alexander Burkin also believed the tradition of sculptural depictions predated the Pokrovsky church sculpture, stating: "16th-century icon painters depicted Saint Nil in a strictly canonical icon tradition on flat panels, but from the 17th century, a unique canon emerged—either a carved high relief or a fully three-dimensional figure of the ascetic." These sculptures became widespread, mostly for domestic use rather than churches. Burkin suggested that Nil's constant standing in the minds of devotees became associated with stylitism, despite his Life being characteristic of a venerable saint, driving the popularity of sculptural depictions. He divided these images into two groups: "folk, where the ascetic is seen as a heroic figure —a spiritual hero, and monastic, where spiritual greatness is hidden behind physical frailty — an ascetic image".

Deputy curator of the Tver Oblast Art Gallery from 1995 to 1997, Valeria Gershfeld, (Note: Valeria Fyodorovna Gershfeld (1942–1997)) a specialist in ancient Russian and 18th- and early 19th-century Russian art, believed the tradition of small Nil images emerged shortly after the monastery's founding. A standardized iconography quickly formed, though deviations existed due to folk veneration. She noted that believers valued these images for Nil's reputation as a healer of legs, a protector on water, and a patron of travelers. Peasants prepared wood in summer, carved sculptures in winter, and painted them in spring for the saint's feast. She attributed the combination of sculpture and plasticity to Western influences.

Burkin challenged Soviet-era views on the sculptures' low artistic quality and limited distribution, arguing:

- Even if produced only in Tver Region, the images must have been spread widely across the Russian empire Empire. Up to 20 thousand pilgrims attended the saint's annual festival, and the monastery had up to 50,000 visitors during the whole year. A lot of them took carved images home.
- Some sculptures were brightly colored with gilding, refuting Kalmykova's claim of only black painting.
- The decline in figurine production was not due to church canon making them formulaic and uninteresting, but the October Revolution and Soviet rule.

Art historian Artur Galashevich claimed that sculptures were initially made in the monastery, but local peasants soon recognized the profitability of this craft and began creating and selling figurines. Folk craftsmen emphasized everyday details, which church authorities criticized as non-canonical, leading to a decree banning peasant production, though it was ignored.

=== Nil Stolobensky's cave in the Pokrovsky church ===
External image
- Sculpture of Venerable Nil Stolobensky in the Resurrection Cathedral
- Wooden sculpture of Nil Stolobensky in the Ascension Cathedral of Znamensky Monastery. Ostashkov, Tver Oblast. August 4, 2007

Protopriest Vladimir Uspensky, (Note: Vladimir Petrovich Uspensky (1824–1894), priest, local historian, graduate of Tver Theological Seminary, teacher in religious schools, priest of the Transfiguration Church in Ostashkov from 1868, protopriest from 1890) a 19th-century Upper Volga historian, wrote about the Church of John the Baptist Church in Nilov Monastery: "The site of [the saint's] cave, previously known by tradition, was discovered in 1777 during the digging of a trench for the church's foundation. In the lower Church of the Intercession of the Theotokos Church, a cast-iron plaque with a commemorative inscription about the saint was installed on a plaque on the northern wall, and a recess was left in the northwest corner, representing the cave itself". Uspensky did not mention the sculpture's presence there. The anonymous Historical Note on the Nilov Monastery (1853) does not mention the sculptural image or the recess in the recess in the Pokrovsky church. Russian educator and corresponding member of the Imperial Saint Petersburg Academy of Sciences, member Sergey Rachinsky, reported satisfaction in visiting the monastery's garden and the cave, traditionally dug by the saint himself, but he failed to mention the statue. He admitted to acquiring books on Seliger's monasteries after his visit, and Uspensky gave him a historical description of the monastery, unavailable at the monastery itself.

=== Final destiny ===
In 1919, the figure of the saint was removed from Nilov Monastery and placed in the closed Ascension Cathedral of Zignamensky Monastery. (Note: Founded in 1673 on the Old Struggle Grounds wasteland south of Ostashkov’s fortress walls, on Lake Seliger’s shore. Closed in 1927 by 1928, it housed a "workers' settlement", a sewing factory, a grain store in the winter church, church and a museum in the summer exhibition in church. The winter church was reopened for services in March 1947. in Ostashkov, Tver Oblast.) Some sources claim it was stored in a grain warehouse, exposed to dampness and cold.

Others state it was part of a museum exhibition. In 1930, a photograph was included in a set of cult wooden sculpture photos by Mikhail Podin. (Note: Mikhail Podin (1884–1969), educator, museum curator, ethnographer, local historian, and founder of the "Rodina" club) A rare copy is held in the Tver Oblast Art Gallery.

After 1945, the Resurrection Cathedral was returned to the Church. The sculpture remained there until 2011, when it was moved to the Museum "Legacy of Saint Nil". Barseghyan claimed this sculpture was made for the Pokrovsky church. She cited a photograph by Otto Renard, Court photographer to the King of Serbia, Prussian subject, owner of a photo studio from 1881 to 1900, member of the Russian Photographic Society from 1895, awarded medals at exhibitions. After selling the studio to Nikolai Nikolsky, photos retained the name "Otto Renard" or "Renard O." in historian Ivan Tokmakov's book City of Ostashkov, Tver Governorate, and Its Uyezd, published in Moscow in 1906, showing a carved sculpture from the Intercession church on Stolobny Island, matching the one in the Ascension Cathedral. Tokmakov briefly described the statue: "The five-domed Church of John the Baptist is particularly interesting. Here is depicted Nil Stolobensky's cave and his statue in a seated position, in schema-monk attire. The saint's relics were found here".

In 2011, the "Legacy of Saint Nil" exhibition, featuring the sculpture, was held at the private Moscow museum House of Icons and Painting. For the first time, Nilov Monastery lent its relics to a secular museum, and the Pokrovsky church sculpture left Lake Seliger's shores after two centuries.

After a restoration in 2012, funded by Pyotr Vyacheslavovich Yamov (born 1970), chairman of the Board of Directors of Vostochny Port in Primorsky Krai, who supported the restoration of Nilov Monastery, including the museum, refectory, and Novotorzhsky Borisoglebsky Monastery, the sculpture resides in the Museum "Legacy of Saint Nil" at Nilov Monastery, which houses the world's largest collection of the saint's images, with the allegedly miraculous sculpture as its centerpiece.

Locations of the Nil Stolobensky sculpture over time
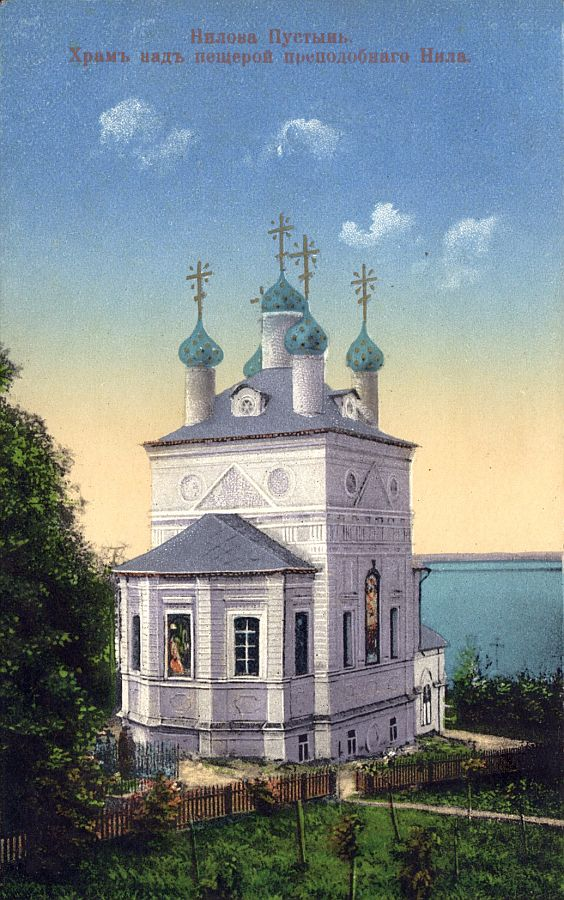
John the Baptist Church over Nil Stolobensky's cave. Pre-revolutionary postcard

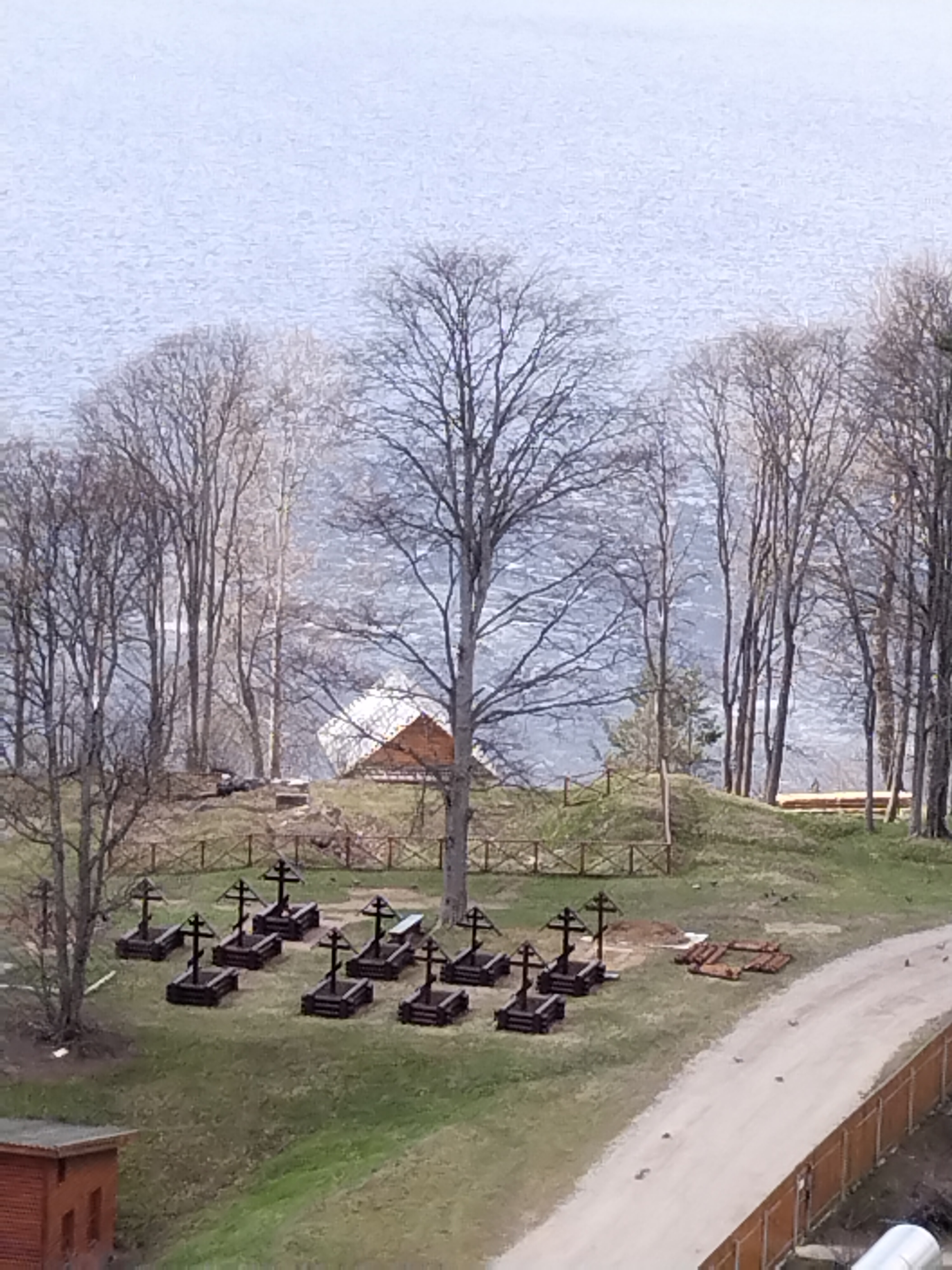
Site of the Church of John the Baptist (on Lake Seliger's shore behind the cemetery, now nonexistent), where the sculpture was originally in the lower church

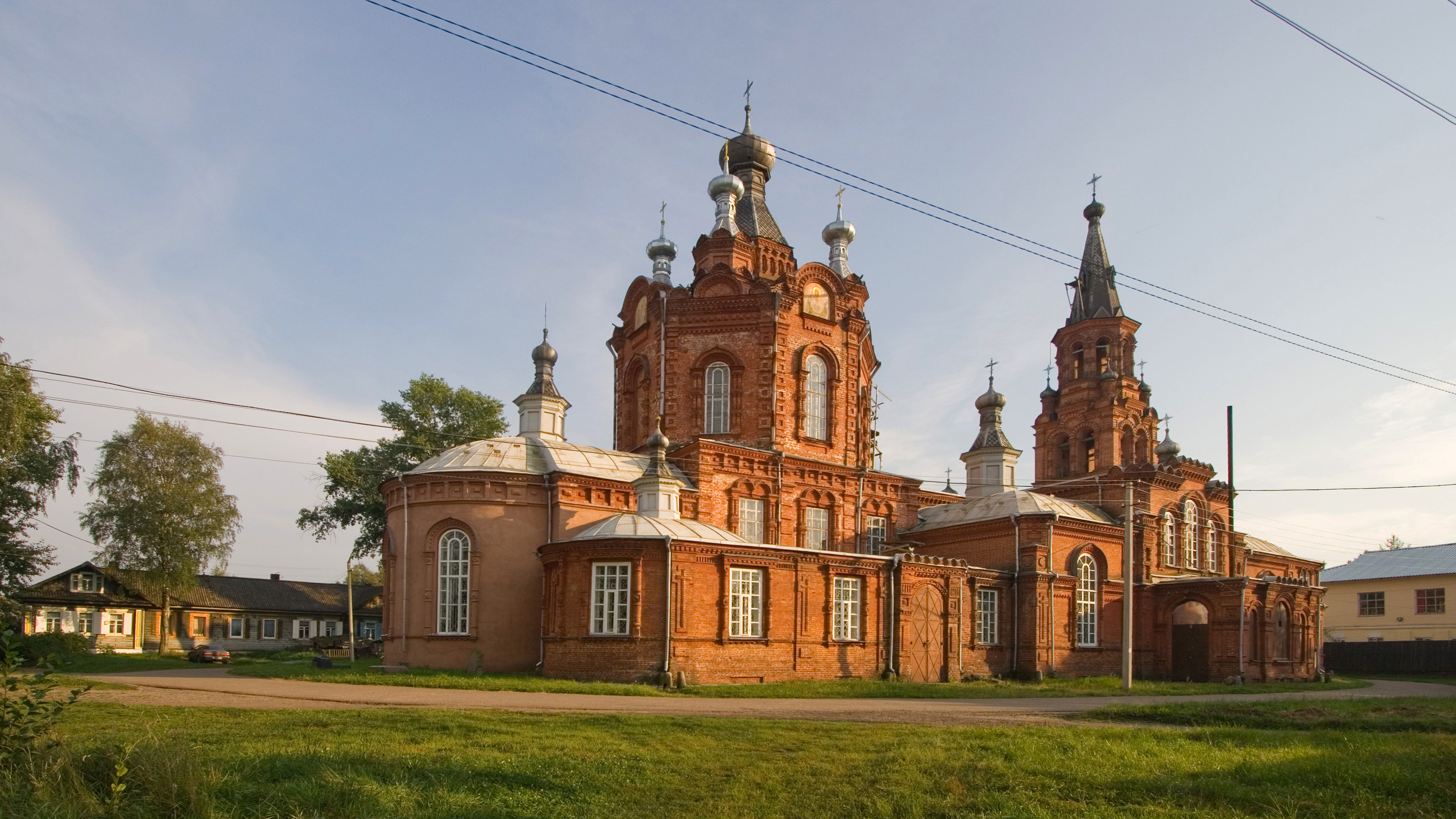
Ostashkov. Ascension Cathedral of the former Znamensky Convent

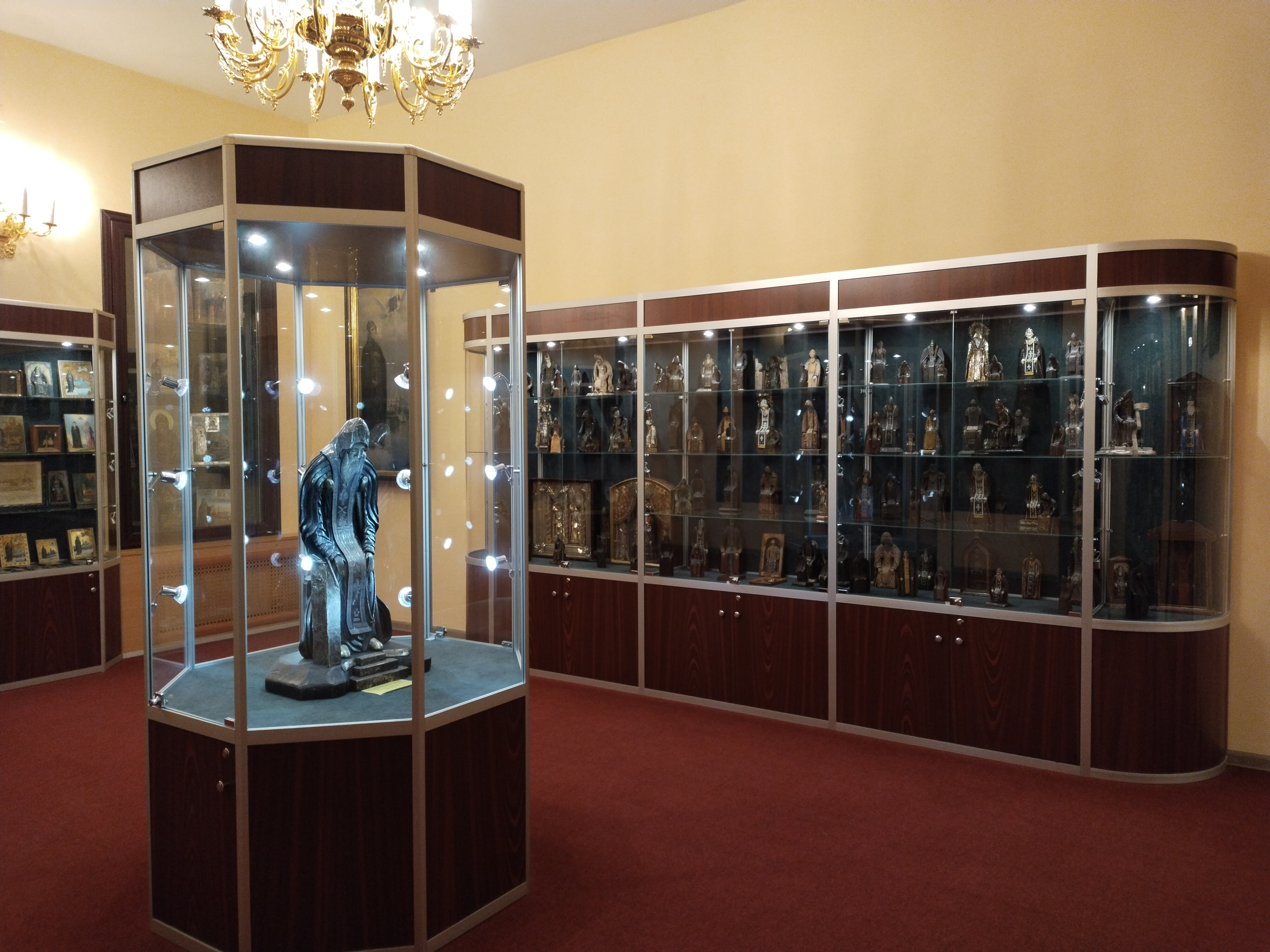
Interior of a hall in the Museum "Legacy of Saint Nil", where the sculpture is now located

== Restoration of the sculpture ==
External images
- Restoration of the Venerable Nil Stolobensky sculpture
- Sculpture before restoration
- Fungal colonies in the wood
- Process of strengthening wood with injections

The restoration involved the State Research Institute for Restoration, Grabar Art Conservation Center, Moscow Kremlin Museums, and Tretyakov Gallery staff. Examination, instrumental analysis, and restoration took place at the Ryabushinsky Museum of Icons and Paintings in Moscow, funded by the Charitable Foundation of Venerable Nil Stolobensky (Note: Registered in 2003 as a nonprofit, engaged in publishing, jewelry production, and retail of souvenirs and religious items; liquidated in 2017) and private donors.

The sculpture was in poor condition, with insect-damaged wood nearly disintegrating and cracked. Restoration lasted six months, from November 2011 to May 2012, including 3D scanning to assess damage.

Restorers from the Grabar Center used "Akrisil-95 A" (Note: Strengthens dry, damaged wood without altering tone, appearance, or texture, increasing strength 4–6 times, enhancing moisture resistance, and suppressing insects and microorganisms) and "Akrisil-95 B", (Note: Used for gluing, filling losses, and sealing holes, with isopropyl alcohol as a binder and wood flour with mineral additives as filler) developed by the State Research Institute for Restoration. The strengthening compound, mixed with wood dust from the sculpture, was injected via syringe to preserve authenticity. The only new addition was the restoration of Nil's missing left sandal.

== Authorship ==
=== Kondraty Konyagin as a possible author ===
No written source names the sculpture's creator. Barseghyan suggested Kondraty Semyonovich Konyagin, a decorator of Ostashkov churches, Nilov Monastery, and Valaam Monastery, as the possible author. In her earlier book Seliger Lands (1988) Barseghyan mentioned Konyagin multiple times but did not link him to the sculpture's authorship. She noted he belonged to a dynasty of Ostashkov artists. Her attribution is based on Konyagin's biography and later works. She argued that only a spiritual person who understands the prayerful feat, could create such a sacred image. Konyagin was interested in hesychast theology and philosophy, evidenced by books he copied after taking monastic vows, now in the Manuscript Department of the Russian State Library. His knowledge of hesychasm informed the sculpture's depiction of hesychast prayer techniques.

Art historian Artur Galashevich and Alexander Finogenov, in their 2010 article Monastery Decorator, reconstructed Konyagin's biography using archival records. (Note: Galashevich first noted aspects of Konyagin’s biography in 1984.) Konyagin, an Ostashkov native, worked mainly in local churches and monasteries. In the 1780s, with painters Ilya Berzin and Semyon Utkin (Yeremeyev), he decorated the interiors of Ostashkov's Trinity and Resurrection cathedrals. From 1787 to 1789, he worked on the Peter and Paul and Exaltation of the Cross churches in Nilov Monastery, where only relief frames and cartouches survive in the latter. He likely crafted the carved iconostasis of the Peter and Paul church (now lost). His preserved relief compositions on gospel themes in the Peter and Paul gate church's octagon include Christmas,Baptism,Coronation of the Virgin, and Burial of Jesus, with cherub heads on walls and vaults and an Eye of Providence in the dome.

Konyagin likely used Upper Volga residents as models, given the individual faces. As a monastery novice, he was sent to Valaam Monastery for decorative work, though no details survive. After returning to Nilov Monastery, he took monastic vows as Kesariy (Caesar) and ceased decorative work, possibly due to age or lack of demand after construction ended. He then focused on copying and illustrating books. Galashevich and Finogenov did not attribute the Nil Stolobensky sculpture to Konyagin.

=== European woodcarving tradition ===
Viktor Gribkov-Maysky, founder of the Tver Woodcarvers' Association and lecturer at the Montpellier Academy, noted that the Pokrovsky church sculpture differs significantly from the traditional depiction of the saint. He suggested it was crafted in Saint Petersburg by a foreigner or a Russian master familiar with Western European woodcarving traditions. In a later article, he argued that another large, early sculpture from Metlino, dating to the late 18th or early 19th century, now in the Toropets Local History Museum, aligns with the traditional depiction. He noted that Nil Stolobensky's sculptural iconography is understudied in art history.

=== Ivan Chelishchev's role ===
Philosopher and Tver local historian Pavel Ivanov believed that local landowner Ivan Chelishchev (Note: Ivan Sergeyevich Chelishchev (1707–1781), owner of the Otolovo estate and builder of the Pokrov and John the Baptist church over Nil’s cave) was involved in the statue's creation. Chelishchev, fluent in foreign languages, erudite, a former Saint Petersburg official, and a theater enthusiast, planned his funeral years in advance as a theatrical performance. Ivanov agreed with Barseghyan that the life-size image in the John the Baptist church became a model for local carvers, but argued:

The idea of creating a "model of the saint’s cave" aligns with the era's theatrical spirit. A "conductor" was needed to bring this spirit to Nilov Monastery, and Ivan Sergeyevich fits perfectly. He could have conceived a "vermilion" in honor of Nil. His wealth silenced objections that this wasn't canonical or unprecedented. If it wasn’t done before—it will be now!

Ivanov cautioned that there's no certainty Chelishchev or his circle "invented" the image. Chelishchev may have proposed the idea without overseeing its execution. The carver could have been from Ostashkov or Chelishchev's estate, where he had serf carvers, sculptors, and artists. Academician Nikolay Ozeretskovsky reported in 1817 that the stone Church of John the Baptist, with a chapel of the Intercession, was built by the Intercession of Mary, was funded by Chelishchev, who wished to be buried there.

=== Local master ===
Art historian Valaia Gershfeld, in City of Artists (1980), called the Pokrovsky sculpture a unique monument of Russian art for church use. She believed the author was likely a local, unidentified Ostashkov carver.

== Veneration and miracles ==
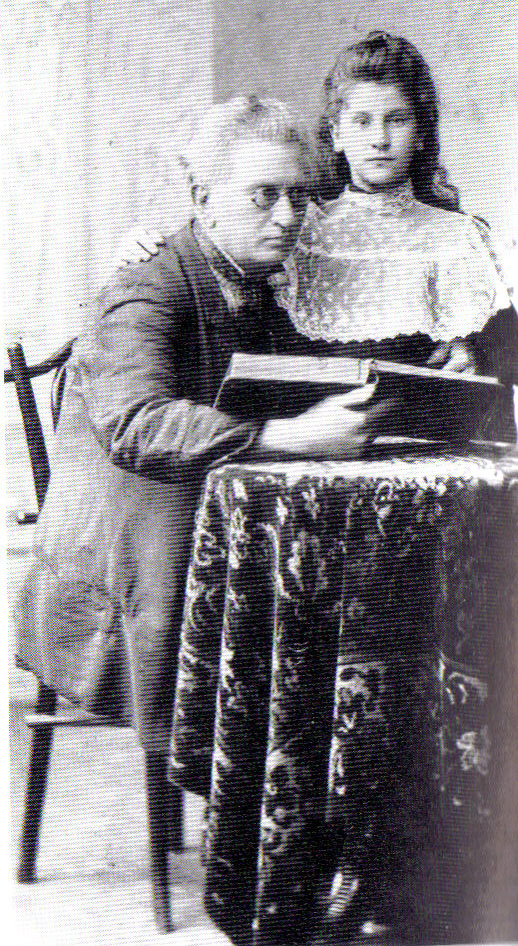
Nil Bogdanovsky with his daughter, 1913

Russian actor and publisher Nil Bogdanovsky (stage name Meryansky, literary pseudonym Elder Nilam), dedicated "Note V" in his 1909 book Nilov Monastery, Ostashkov Uyezd, Tver Governorate (Travel Notes) to the Pokrovsky and the sculpture. He described a recess in the northwest corner of the church, housing the life-size sculpture, which deeply affected a "nervous" viewer, appearing "almost alive". He saw a pilgrim kneel before it, striking his forehead on the floor, with tears and fervent sighs, his face inspired.

Bogdanov found the sculpture eerie: "as if [Nil] were listening to a confession and ready to raise his epitaphios for absolving prayer". A local priest recommended taking sand from the niche, saying it cured "tremors" when mixed with holy, or healed limbs when used to wash them. The priest suggested collecting it in a handkerchief. Bogdanov noted a cast-iron plaque mentioning sand, an oven, and fired clay as signs identifying the cave's ancient site during construction.

== Artistic characteristics ==
Barseghyan argued the sculpture is in the baroque style, evidenced by the intricate modeling of vestments — "deep, flowing folds of the mantle's edges". The figure's proportions are balanced, with a vivid, painterly plastic solution. Yet, the saint's pose adheres to strict Orthodox iconographic canon, with a static, monumental frontal stance and cascading mantle folds forming a base.

Barseghyan noted the sculpture's "soft and smooth plastic treatment, reflecting Central Russia and Moscow's influence". She identified Belarusian and Western European baroque elements but noted the absence of formal expressiveness. Compared to European baroque, it is restrained and balanced, avoiding decorative opulence and exuberance.

The House of Icons and Painting website states that Nil is depicted at the moment of death (a view shared by Alexander Burkin for all sculptures), per his Life: "sharpened features of an enlightened face with calmly closed eyes, a schema-clad body supported by crutches with limp limbs, contrasts with dynamic drapery". It calls the sculpture a rare surviving large temple piece, a "unique, unparalleled monument of Russian wooden sculpture, part of national cultural heritage". Archimandrite Vassion, however, argued it shows Nil during a brief respite from his vows, not death.

== Bibliography ==
Sources

- Bogdanov, Nikolay Ivanovich (1909). "Note V". Нилова пустынь. Осташков. уезда, Тверск. губ. (Путевые заметки) [Nilov Monastery, Ostashkov Uyezd, Tver Governorate (Travel Notes)]. Novgorod: Ekaterina V. Nerusheva’s Publishing. pp. 41–55.
- Историческая записка о Ниловой пустыни, что на озере Силигере [Historical Note on Nilov Monastery on Lake Selige]. Tver: Gubernatorial Press. 1853.
- Ozeretskiy, Nikolay Yakovlevich (1817). "On Nilov Monastery". Путешествие на озеро Селигер [Travel to Lake Seliger]. Saint Petersburg: Imperial Academy of Sciences Press. pp. 118–135.
- Rachinsky, Alexander Vasilyevich (1876). Нилова пустынь в первые полутораста лет её существования. Исторический очерк по старинным монастырским документам [Nilov Monastery in Its First 150 Years: Historical Sketch Based on Ancient Monastic Documents]. Moscow: Imperial Society of Russian History and Antiquities at Moscow University.
- Rachinsky, Sergey Alexandrovich (2019). "School Trip to Nilov Monastery". In I. Ushakov, O.A. Platonov (ed.). Народная педагогика [Folk Pedagogy]. Moscow: Russian Civilization. pp. 173–234. ISBN 978-5-9070-3700-7.
- Tokmakov, Ivan Fyodorovich (1906). "Nil Stolobensky Male Monastery". Город Осташков Тверской губернии и его уезд [City of Ostashkov, Tver Governorate, and Its Uyezd]. Moscow: Moscow City Press. pp. 385–397.
- Uspensky, Vladimir Petrovich (1886–1887). Историческое описание Ниловой Столобенской пустыни Тверской епархии Осташковскаго уезда [Historical Description of Nilov Stolobensky Monastery, Tver Diocese, Ostashkov Uyezd] (PDF) (3rd, revised ed.). Tver: Nilov Stolobensky Monastery Publishing, Gubernatorial Press. pp. 68–70.

Academic and popular literature

- Barseghyan, Tamara Vasilyevna (1998). "Chapter 3. Stolobny Island—Center of Ecclesiastical Arts". Нило-Столобенская пустынь — духовный, культурный и художественный центр Верхней Волги. Автореферат на соискание учёной степени кандидата искусствоведения [Nilov-Stolobensky Monastery: Spiritual, Cultural, and Artistic Center of the Upper Volga. Dissertation Abstract for Candidate of Art History]. Moscow: Moscow State University Press. pp. 17–23.
- Barseghyan, Tamara Vasilyevna (2001). "Sacred and Temple Sculpture". Земля Истока… Очерки культуры Верхневолжья [Land of Origins: Essays on Upper Volga Culture]. Moscow: Moscow State University Press. pp. 334–356.
- Barseghyan, Tamara Vasilyevna (2002). Искусство и культура Верхней Волги Северо-Запада Тверских земель. Автореферат на соискание учёной степени доктора искусствоведения [Art and Culture of the Upper Volga Northwest Tver Lands. Dissertation Abstract for Doctor of Art History]. Moscow: Moscow Stroganov Art and Industry Academy.
- Barseghyan, Tamara Vasilyevna (1999). "Sculptural Image of Venerable Nil Stolobensky". Нило-Столобенская пустынь. Монастырь и мир [Nilov-Stolobensky Monastery: Monastery and World]. Moscow: MSU Press. pp. 191–205. ISBN 5-2110-4063-5.
- Barseghyan, Tamara Vasilyevna (1988). Селигерские земли. Путеводитель [Seliger Lands: Guidebook]. Moscow: Soviet Russia. ISBN 5-2680-0744-0.
- Barseghyan, Tamara Vasilyevna (2010). T.V. Barseghyan (ed.). "Чудотворный скульптурный образ преподобного Нила Столобенского" [Miraculous Sculptural Image of Venerable Nil Stolobensky]. Nilov-Stolobensky Monastery: New Discoveries. From the History of Spaso-Andronikov Monastery. 60th Anniversary of Museum Founding and 50th Anniversary of Its Exhibition Opening (4 (4786)). Moscow: Moscow State University Press, Novosti: 86–91. ISBN 978-5-2110-5765-4.
- Barseghyan, Tamara Vasilyevna (2017). "Sculptural Image of Nil Stolobensky". Музей «Наследие преподобного Нила» [Museum "Legacy of Venerable Nil"]. Tver: Nikolin Den, Pareto-Print. pp. 24–27. ISBN 978-5-9065-7093-2.
- Burkin, Alexander Ivanovich (2002). "Образ Преподобного Нила Столобенского в иконописи и деревянной скульптуре (по материалам частной коллекции А. И. Буркина)" [Image of Venerable Nil Stolobensky in Iconography and Wooden Sculpture (Based on A.I. Burkin’s Private Collection)] (PDF). Ancient Rus: Questions of Medieval Studies. Reports from the 1st International Conference. 1 (7). Moscow: 43–46.
- Vassian, Archimandrite (1994). "Преподобный Нил Столобенский и его обитель" [Venerable Nil Stolobensky and His Monastery]. Nashe Naslediye (32). Moscow: 18–24. ISSN 0234-1395.
- Gershfeld, Valeria Fyodorovna (1994). "Город художников" [City of Artists]. Nashe Naslediye (32). Moscow: 3–17. ISSN 0234-1395.
- Galashevich, Artur Adamovich; Finogenov, Alexander Ivanovich (2010). T.V. Barseghyan (ed.). "Монастырский лепщик" [Monastery Decorator]. Nilov-Stolobensky Monastery: New Discoveries. From the History of Spaso-Andronikov Monastery (4 (4786)). Moscow: Moscow State University Press, Novosti: 92–96. ISBN 978-5-2110-5765-4.
- Galashevich, Artur Adamovich (1983). Художественные памятники Селигерского края [Artistic Monuments of the Seliger Region] (2nd, revised ed.). Moscow: Iskusstvo.
- Gribkov-Maysky, Viktor Mikhailovich (2017). "Русская деревянная скульптура" [Russian Wooden Sculpture]. Service in Russia and Abroad. 11 (6 (76)). Moscow: Russian State University of Tourism: 179–184.
- Gribkov-Maysky (2016). "Скультурный образ преподобного чудотворца" [Sculptural Image of Venerable Nil Stolobensky as a Phenomenon of Russian National Culture]. Velikoross (July, no. 87). Moscow.
- Desyatnikov, Vladimir Alexandrovich (1972). "Main Themes and Their Origins". Русская деревянная скульптура. Moscow: Znanie. pp. 24–27.
- Kalmykova, Lyudmila Elmarmovna (1995). "Carving and Wood Painting". Народное искусство [Folk Art of the Tver Region]. Tver: RIF LTD. pp. 37–94. ISBN 978-5-9065-7093-2.
- Sobolev, Nikolay Nikolaevich (1934). "Chapter X: Wooden Religious and Secular Carving". Русская народная резьба по дереву [Russian Folk Wood Carving] (PDF). Moscow, Leningrad: Academia.edu. pp. 380–448.
- Chekalov, Alexander Kalimovich (1974). "Artistic Features of Northern Wooden Sculpture". Народная деревянная скульптура [Folk Wooden Sculpture]. Moscow, Leningrad: Iskusstvo. pp. 132–175.
