= Stolobny Island =

Island on Lake Seliger in Tver Oblast, Russia

Coordinates: 57.235°N 33.064°E

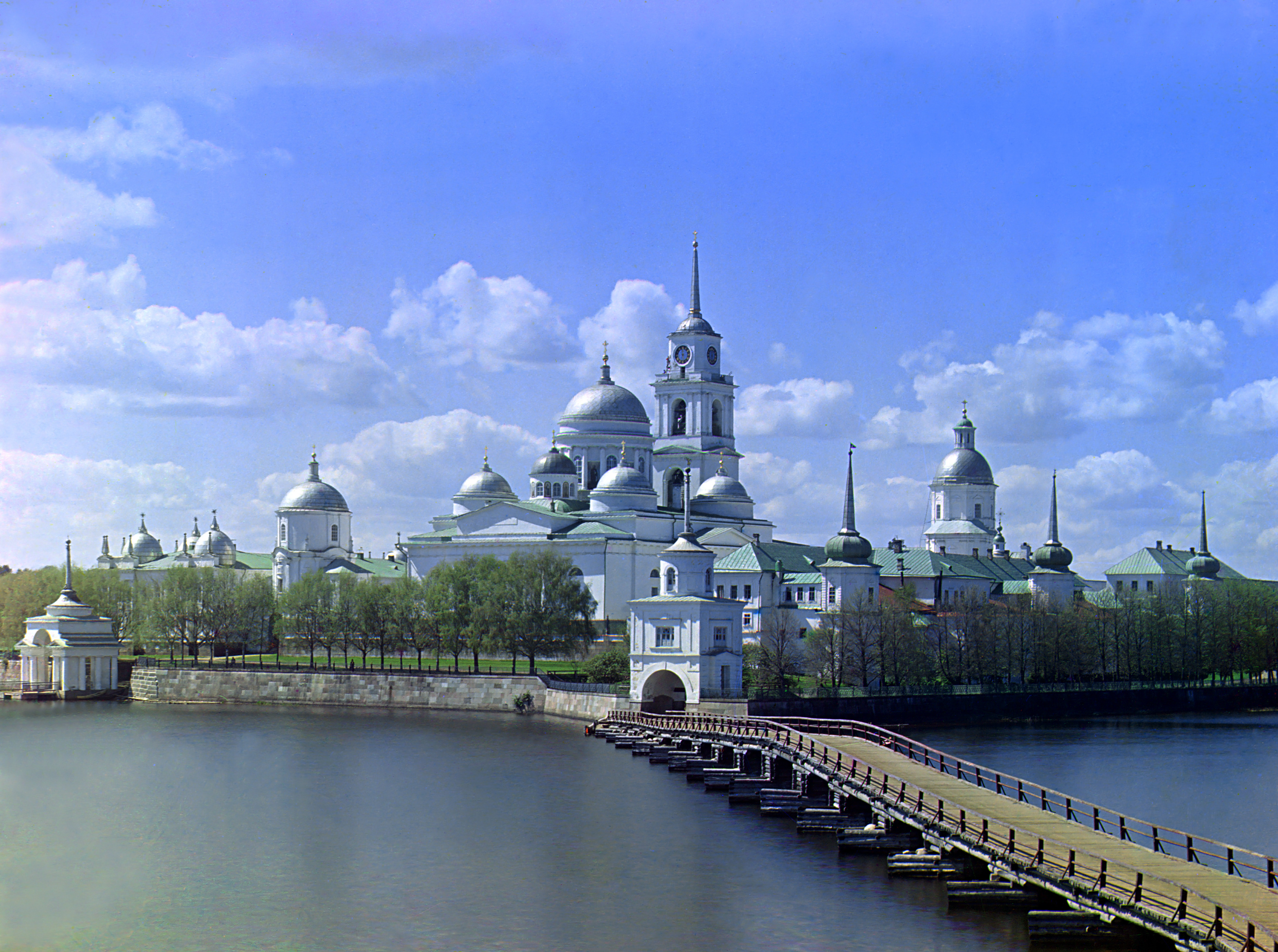
Nilov Monastery is situated on Stolobny Island in Lake Seliger. The photo was taken by Sergey Prokudin-Gorsky in 1910. For comparison with modern views of the same places in Ostashkov, click here.

Stolobny Island is an island on Lake Seliger in the Tver Oblast of Russia, about 10 km (6.2 mi) north of the town of Ostashkov.

== Nilov Monastery ==
The island is the home of Nilov Monastery, which was founded by Saint Nilus in 1594, and previously welcomed up to 40,000 pilgrims each year. Most of the buildings of the monastery were built in the 18th and 19th centuries in a neoclassical style. Today the monastery complex remains one of the most impressive ensembles of Neoclassical architecture in Eastern Europe. Some of its churches date back to the 17th century. A graceful embankment was completed by 1812, and a large cathedral built in 1821-25. The construction of the causeway to the island was completed in 1812. The Nilov Monastery was one of the largest and wealthiest monasteries in the Russian Empire. Since the 1980s, many Russian Orthodox Christians commemorate the Feast of the Epiphany on January 19th by submerging themselves in the freezing waters, including those surrounding the monastery and the island.

== Origin of name ==
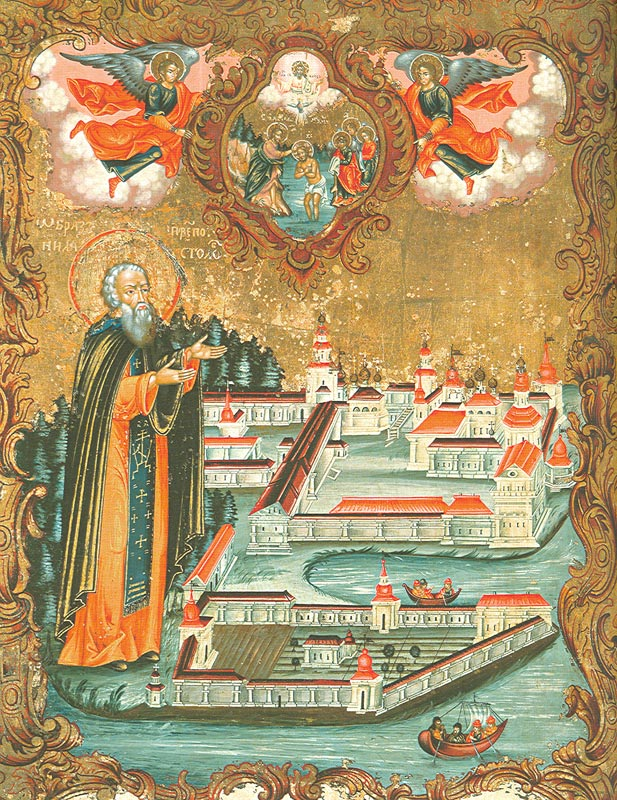
Nil Stolobensky icon, 1771

Regarding the name of the island - "Stolobny" - there are two versions. One goes that it got its name because of its shape, like a pole, and the second, is that there was an ancient pagan temple that included a sacrificial post. In 1515 the Rev. Nil (Neil in English) Krypetsky worked as a lumberjack. He lived alone, ate grass and acorns, all the time spent in prayer. According to legend, one day robbers went to Rev. Nil, and decided to kill him. However, he prayed silently, went out to them with an icon of the Blessed Virgin. The robbers, dreaming that the Rev. was defended by many armed men, fell at his feet, repented and begged forgiveness.

Gradually the fame of the hermit spread through the local villages. People began coming to him, seeking prayers and teachings. In 1528, tired of all the attention, he moved to a new location - the island of Stolobny at Lake Seliger, near Ostashkov. The first year he lived in a dugout, then built a hut and a chapel for prayers. According to legend, the devil repeatedly sent different calamities against the hermit - fires, even robbers tried to throw his cell in the lake. However, Rev. Nil was adamant, overcoming all attacks by prayer and faith.

Rev. Nil lived on the island a total of 27 years before his death, and he bequeathed to build a monastery on this site, which was later made. Nil died in 1555 and was buried on Stolobny. In 1594, with the permission of the Patriarch Job, a monastic cloister opened on the island. Thus began the history of monastery Nilo - Stolobensky. The founder of the monastery was a monk Herman.

== History ==
In 1919, after the October Revolution, the monastery was confiscated. It was closed in 1927 by the Soviet government and subsequently used for various purposes. From 1927 to 1939 there was a work camp for underage criminals.

In the period 1939 to 1941, during the first years of World War II, the monastery was a prisoner of war camp of the Russian secret service NKVD, which held approximately 7,000 Polish prisoners of war who had been taken captive by the Soviet Union following the Soviet invasion of Poland in September 1939. Almost all of the prisoners were subsequently executed in April 1940 in Kalinin (now Tver) and then buried in mass graves in Mednoye, an act which became known as the Katyn Massacre. Amongst those killed were Polish officers, lawyers, policemen, teachers, doctors, and other members of the intelligentsia.

From 1941 to 1945 there was a hospital in the building complex, and again from 1945 to 1960, a camp for minors and orphans. From 1960 to 1971 the monastery was used as a retirement home, and from 1971 to 1990 a hostel for tourists.

== Current status ==
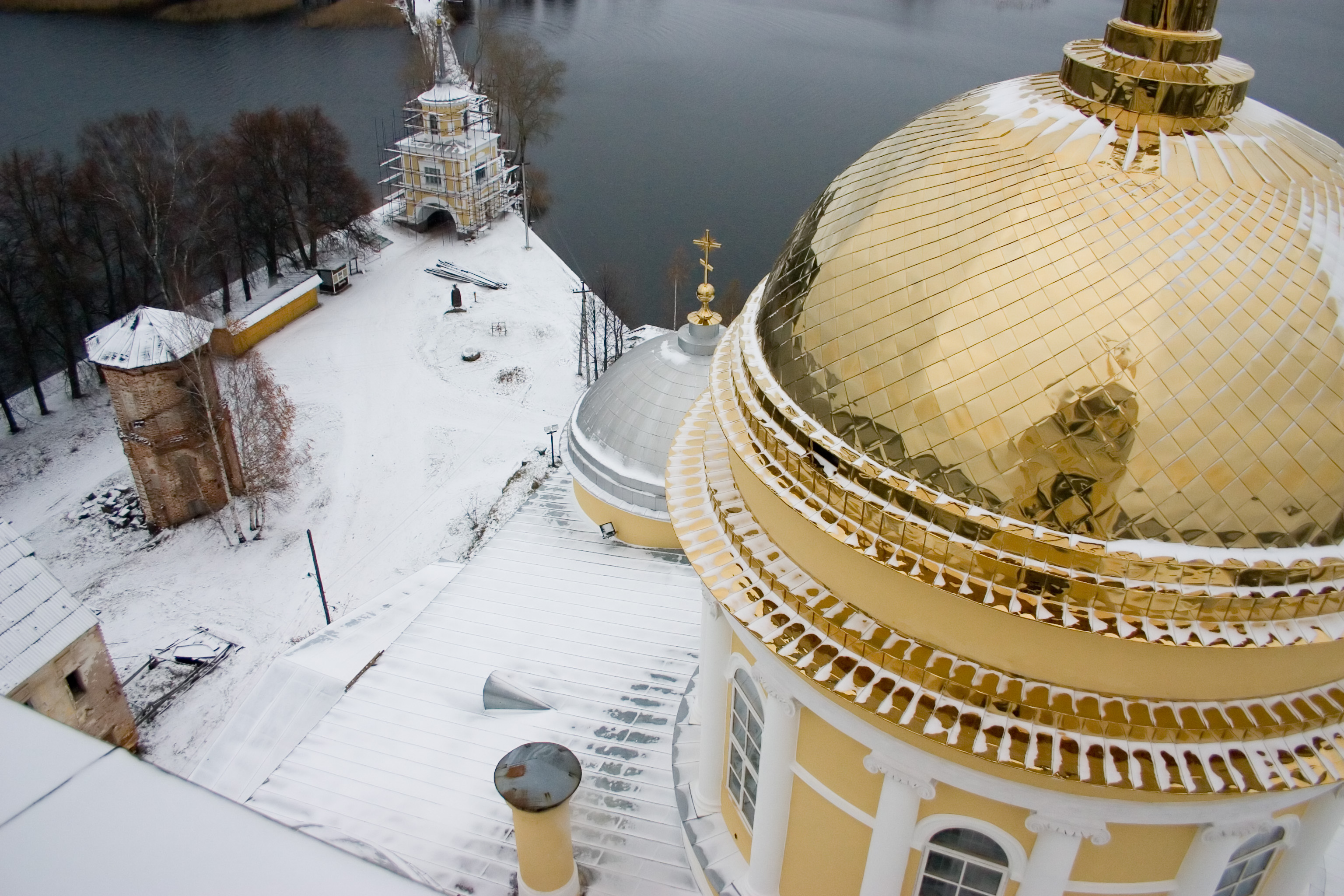
View from the bell tower

After 1990, the complex was given back to the Russian Orthodox Church, and in 1995 it opened again as a functioning monastery, which it still is today.

- The monastery has a few farmsteads, including in Torzhok;
- The monastery also has its own apiary (also known as a bee yard), and in the church shop you can buy consecrated honey;
- The monastery produces its own candles, milk and has a carpentry shop, a barn and stables;
- For visiting pilgrims a special hotel is available;
- The restoration of the façades of the monastery started in 2009.

== Gallery ==
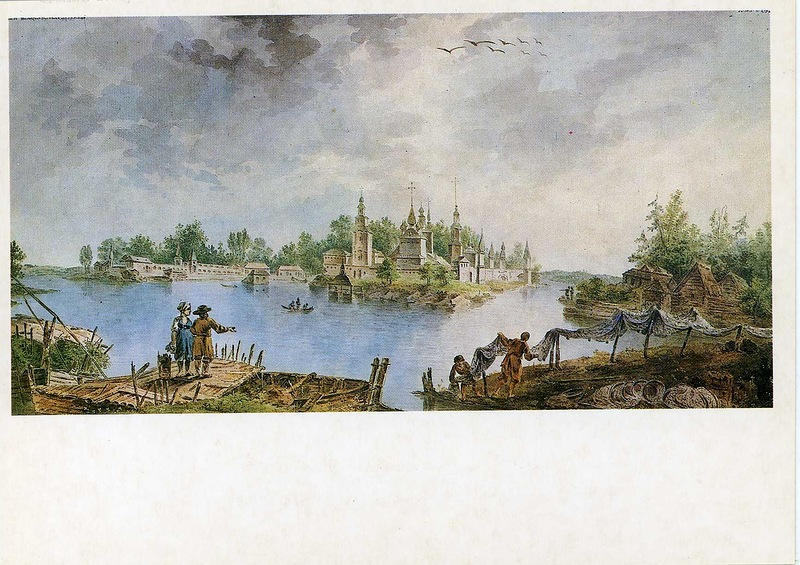

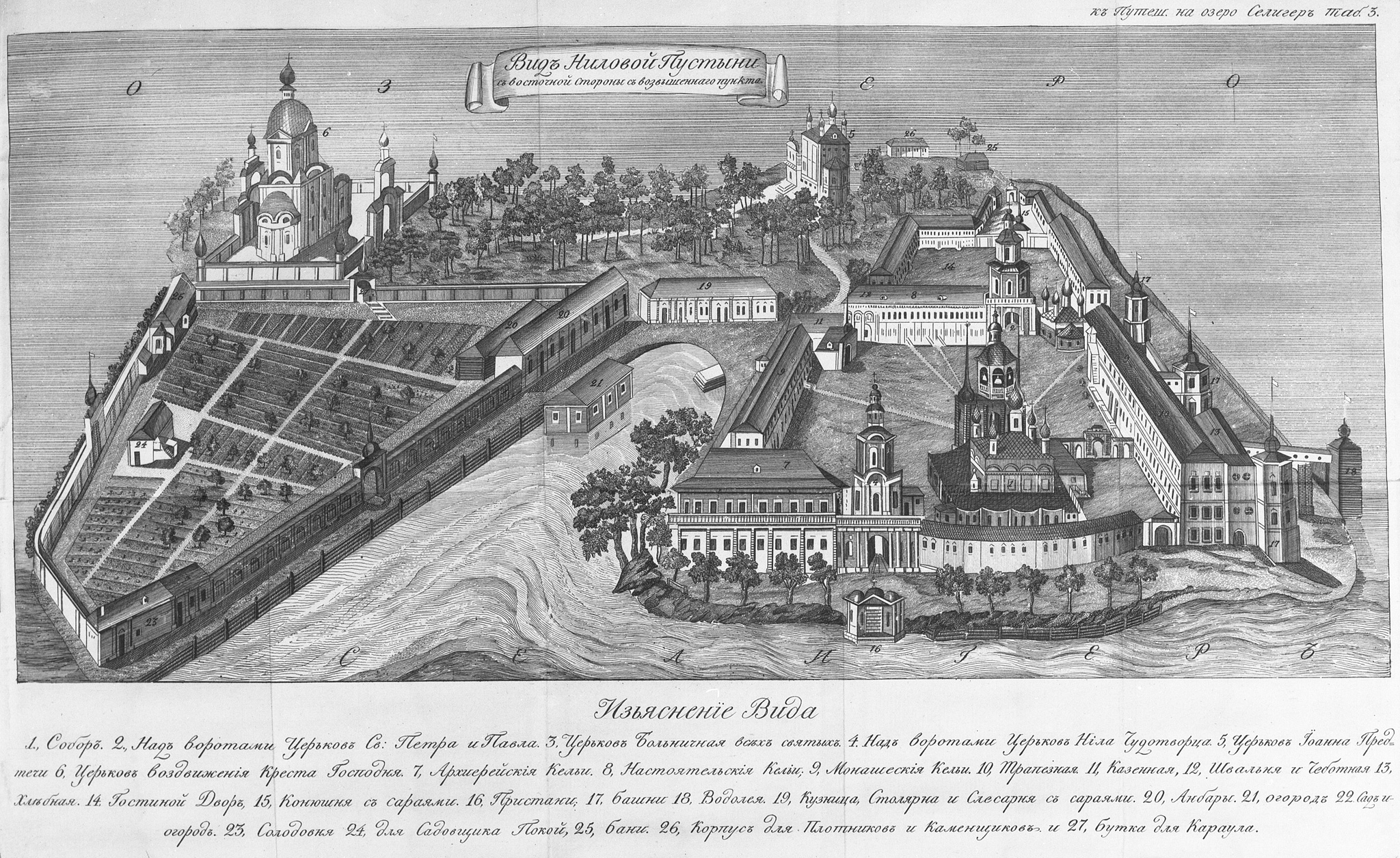

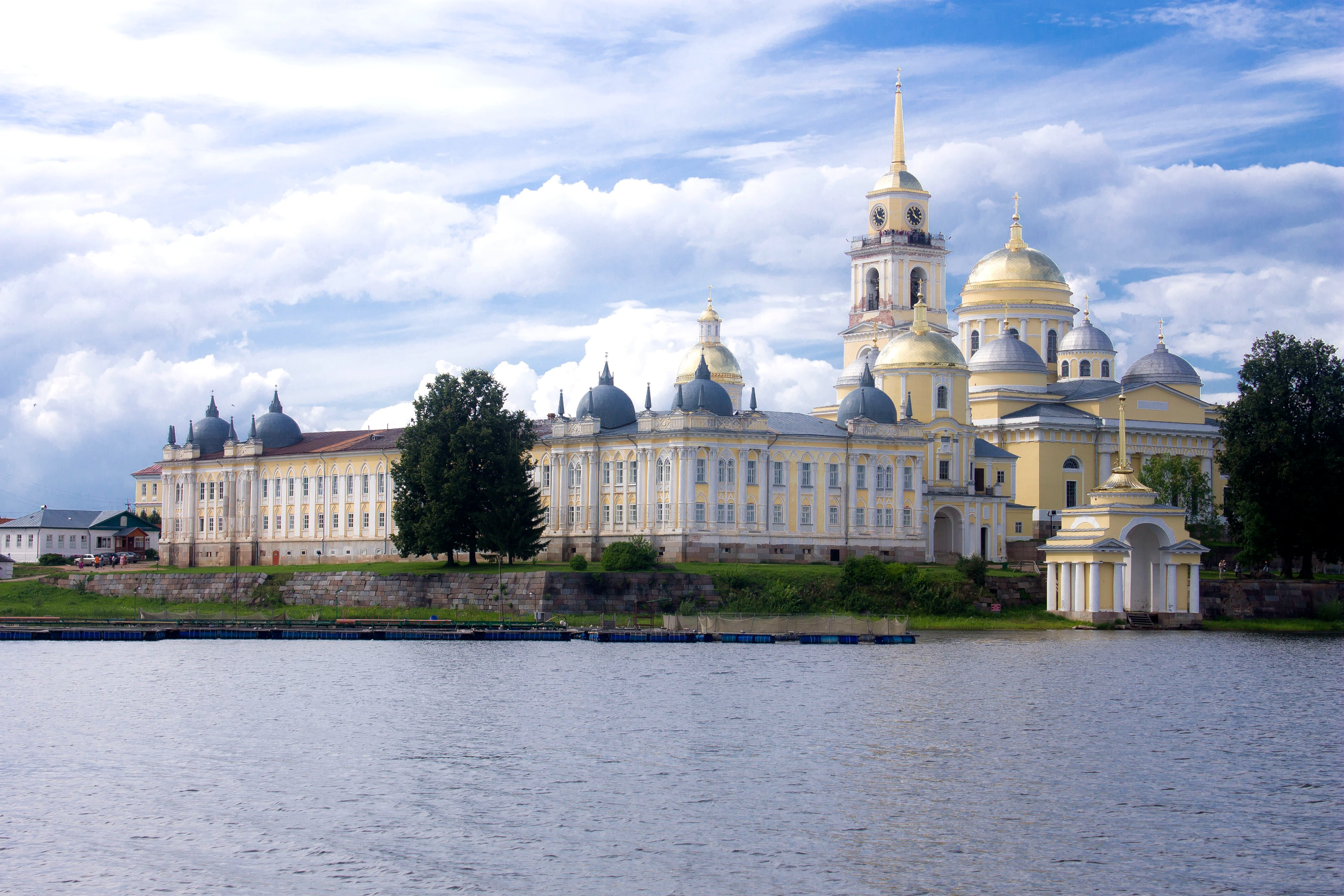

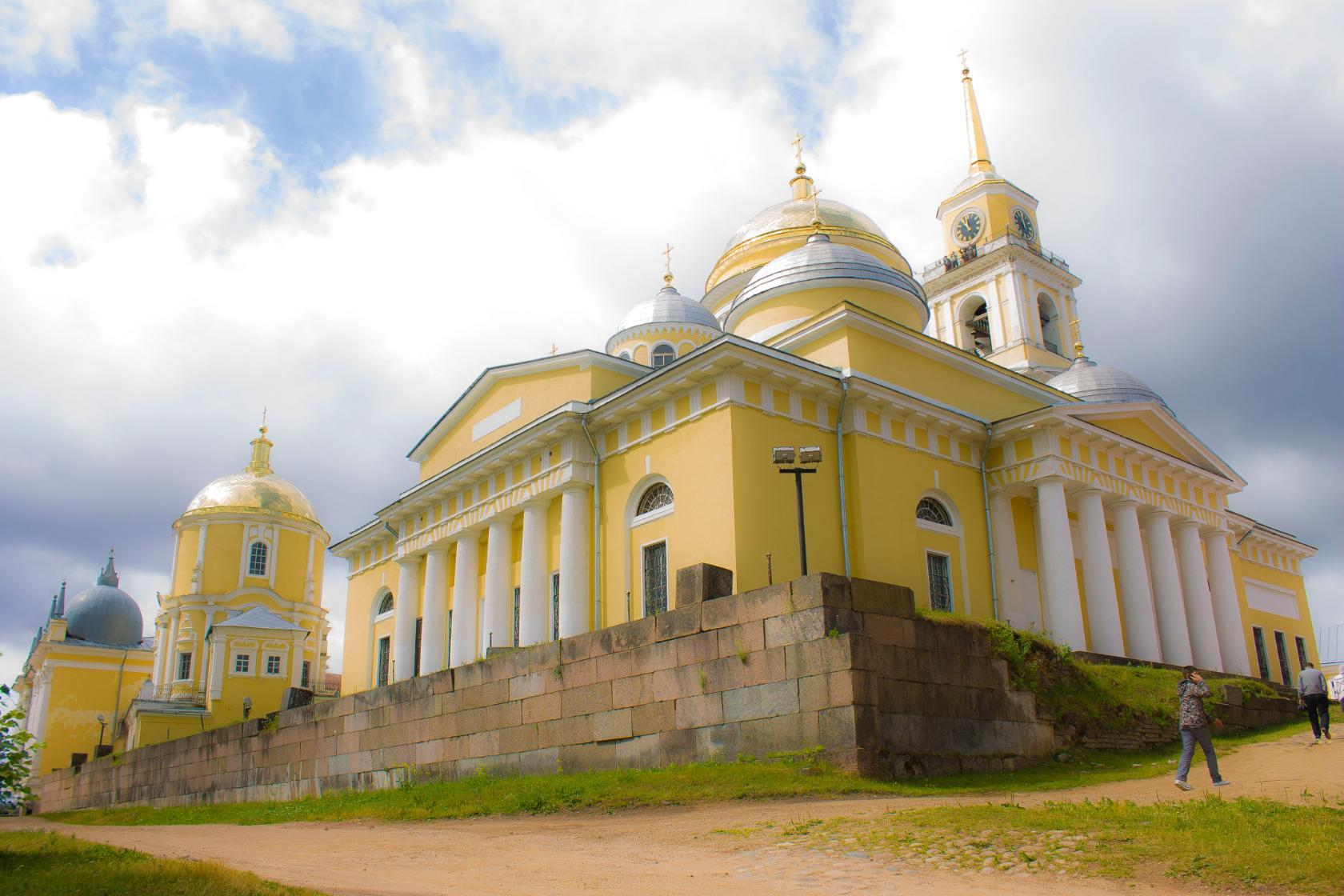

== See also ==
- Nil Stolobensky
