= List of commemorative coins of Russia (2009) =

This is a list of commemorative coins issued by the Central Bank of Russia in 2009:

Commemorative coins issued by the Central Bank of Russia in 2009
| Name | Date of issue | Catalogue number | Nominal value | Total mintage | Image (front) | Image (reverse) |
Individual issues
| 175th anniversary of the birthday of scientist-encyclopaedist Dmitri Mendeleev | 11 January 2009 | 5110-0093 | 2 rubles | 5,000 | | |
| 50th anniversary of the commencement of Moon research by space equipment | 11 January 2009 | 5111-0180 | 3 rubles | 5,000 | | |
| 175th anniversary of the Alexander I monument in Saint Petersburg | 25 September 2009 | 5115-0052 | 25 rubles | 1,000 | | |
Investment coins
| Saint George the Victorious | 11 January 2009 | 5111-0178 | 3 rubles | 280,000 | | |
| Saint George the Victorious | 2 February 2009 | 5216-0060-09 | 50 rubles | 500,000 | | |
Historical series: The History of Russian Currency
| The History of Russian Currency | 1 October 2009 | 5111-0189 | 3 rubles | 5,000 | | |
| The History of Russian Currency | 1 October 2009 | 5117-0043 | 100 rubles | 250 | | |
| The History of Russian Currency | 1 October 2009 | 5217-0036 | 100 rubles | 27,000 | | |
| The History of Russian Currency | 1 October 2009 | 5220-0007 | 1,000 rubles | 150 | | |
| The History of Russian Currency | 1 October 2009 | 5225-0002 | 25,000 rubles | 50 | | |
Historical Series: 200th anniversary of the birthday of Nikolai Vasiliyevich Gogol
| 200th anniversary of the birthday of Nikolai Vasiliyevich Gogol | 2 March 2009 | 5111-0183 | 3 rubles | 5,000 | | |
| 200th anniversary of the birthday of Nikolai Vasiliyevich Gogol | 2 March 2009 | 5117-0041 | 100 rubles | 500 | | |
| 200th anniversary of the birthday of Nikolai Vasiliyevich Gogol | 2 March 2009 | 5216-0069 | 50 rubles | 1,500 | | |
| 200th anniversary of the birthday of Nikolai Vasiliyevich Gogol | 2 March 2009 | 5219-0010 | 200 rubles | 500 | | |
Historical Series: 300th anniversary of the Battle of Poltava (8 July 1709)
| 300th anniversary of the Battle of Poltava (8 July 1709) | 1 June 2009 | 5111-0185 | 3 rubles | 10,000 | | |
| 300th anniversary of the Battle of Poltava (8 July 1709) | 1 June 2009 | 5115-0050 | 25 rubles | 15,000 | | |
| 300th anniversary of the Battle of Poltava (8 July 1709) | 1 June 2009 | 5117-0042 | 100 rubles | 500 | | |
Historical Series: 400th anniversary of the voluntary entrance of the Kalmyk people into the Russian State
| 400th anniversary of the voluntary entrance of the Kalmyk people into the Russian State | 2 March 2009 | 5111-0182 | 3 rubles | 5,000 | | |
| 400th anniversary of the voluntary entrance of the Kalmyk people into the Russian State | 2 March 2009 | 5117-0040 | 100 rubles | 500 | | |
| 400th anniversary of the voluntary entrance of the Kalmyk people into the Russian State | 2 March 2009 | 5216-0068 | 50 rubles | 1,500 | | |
Series: Armed Forces of the Russian Federation
| Air Force | 4 May 2009 | 5109-0091 | 1 ruble | 5,000 | | |
| Air Force | 4 May 2009 | 5109-0092 | 1 ruble | 5,000 | | |
| Air Force | 4 May 2009 | 5109-0093 | 1 ruble | 5,000 | | |
Series: Prominent personalities of Russia
| Poet A.V. Koltsov - the 200th anniversary of the birthday | 1 September 2009 | 5110-0094 | 2 rubles | 5,000 | | |
| Architect A.N. Voronikhin - the 250th anniversary of the birthday | 1 September 2009 | 5110-0095 | 2 rubles | 5,000 | | |
| Ballerina G.S. Ulanova - the 100th anniversary of the birthday | 1 December 2009 | 5110-0099 | 2 rubles | 5,000 | | |
Series: Prominent sportsmen of Russia (Ice hockey)
| V.M. Bobrov | 30 October 2009 | 5110-0096 | 2 rubles | 3,000 | | |
| A.N. Maltzev | 30 October 2009 | 5110-0097 | 2 rubles | 3,000 | | |
| V.B. Kharlamov | 30 October 2009 | 5110-0098 | 2 rubles | 3,000 | | |
Series: Ancient Towns of Russia
| Vyborg, (13th century), Leningrad Oblast | 2 March 2009 | 5514-0060 | 10 rubles | 5,000,000 | | |
| Galich, (13th century), Kostroma Oblast | 1 June 2009 | 5514-0061 | 10 rubles | 5,000,000 | | |
| Kaluga, (14th century) | 1 June 2009 | 5514-0062 | 10 rubles | 5,000,000 | | |
| Veliky Novgorod, (the 9th century) | 3 August 2009 | 5514-0065 | 10 rubles | 5,000,000 | | |
Series: Fauna of the member states of the Eurasian Economic Community
| Bear | 3 August 2009 | 5111-0187 | 3 rubles | 5,000 | | |
Series: Winter sports
| Speed skating | 1 July 2009 | 5219-0011 | 200 rubles | 500 | | |
| Ski jumping | 3 August 2009 | 5219-0012 | 200 rubles | 500 | | |
| Luge | 25 September 2009 | 5219-0013 | 200 rubles | 500 | | |
| Biathlon | 1 October 2009 | 5219-0014 | 200 rubles | 500 | | |
| Figure skating | 2 November 2009 | 5219-0015 | 200 rubles | 500 | | |
Series: Legends and tales of the member states of the Eurasian Economic Community
| Tales of the peoples of Russia | 3 August 2009 | 5111-0188 | 3 rubles | 5,000 | | |
Series: Lunar calendar
| Tiger | 2 November 2009 | 5111-0190 | 3 rubles | 15,000 | | |
Series: Architectural monuments of Russia
| Vitebsky Rail Terminal (early 20th century), Saint Petersburg | 11 January 2009 | 5111-0179 | 3 rubles | 7,500 | | |
| Tula Kremlin (16th century) | 2 February 2009 | 5111-0181 | 3 rubles | 10,000 | | |
| Arkhangelskoye Estate (18th — 19th centuries), Moscow Oblast | 4 May 2009 | 5115-0049 | 25 rubles | 1,500 | | |
| Odygitriya Church (17th century), Smolensk Oblast | 1 July 2009 | 5111-0186 | 3 rubles | 10,000 | | |
| Saint Trinity Skanov Monastery (18th—19th centuries), Penza Oblast | 3 August 2009 | 5115-0051 | 25 rubles | 1,500 | | |
| Saint Nikolas Monastery (17th—20th centuries), Staraya Ladoga | 1 December 2009 | 5115-0053 | 25 rubles | 1,500 | | |
Series: Russian Federation
| Republic of Kalmykia | 2 March 2009 | 5514-0059 | 10 rubles | 10,000,000 | | |
| Jewish Autonomous Oblast | 1 June 2009 | 5514-0063 | 10 rubles | 10,000,000 | | |
| Republic of Adygeya | 1 July 2009 | 5514-0064 | 10 rubles | 10,000,000 | | |
| Komi Republic | 1 October 2009 | 5514-0066 | 10 rubles | 10,000,000 | | |
| Kirov Oblast | 2 November 2009 | 5514-0067 | 10 rubles | 10,000,000 | | |
Series: Russia in the global, cultural and natural heritage of UNESCO
| Historic monuments of Veliky Novgorod and its environs | 1 April 2009 | 5111-0184 | 3 rubles | 10,000 | | |
| Historic monuments of Veliky Novgorod and its environs | 1 April 2009 | 5115-0048 | 25 rubles | 1,500 | | |
| Historic monuments of Veliky Novgorod and its environs | 1 April 2009 | 5119-0004 | 200 rubles | 200 | | |
| Historic monuments of Veliky Novgorod and its environs | 1 April 2009 | 5216-0070 | 50 rubles | 1,500 | | |
| Historic monuments of Veliky Novgorod and its environs | 1 April 2009 | 5221-0017 | 10,000 rubles | 100 | | |
