= 1804 in Russia =

Events from the year 1804 in Russia

== Incumbents ==
- Monarch – Alexander I

== Events ==
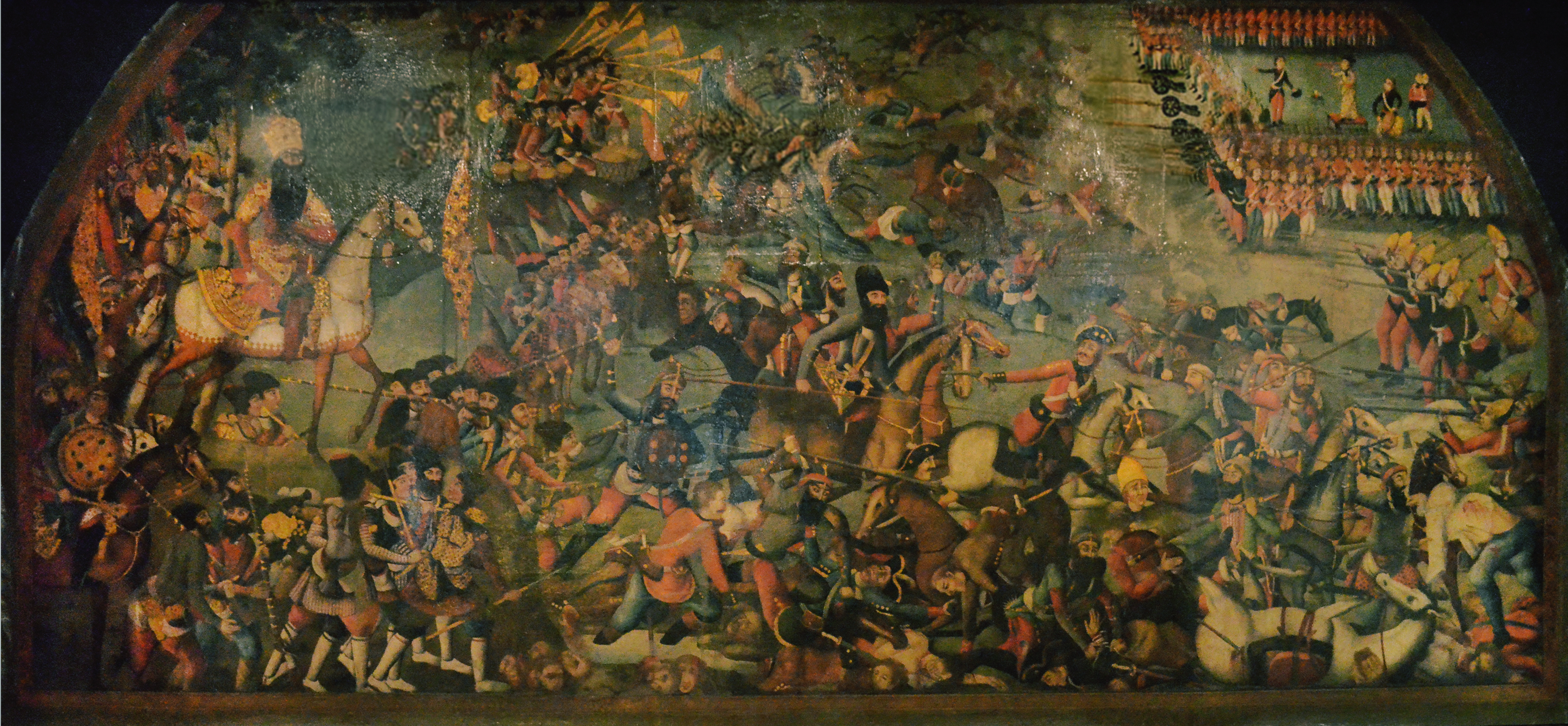
Fath Ali Shah's victory over the Russians at Yerevan as depicted by Mirza Baba.

- Russo-Tlingit War (1802-1805)
  - Battle of Sitka
- Russo-Persian War (1804–1813)
  - January - Siege of Ganja (1804)
  - June - Battle of Echmiadzin (1804)
  - July - September - Siege of Erivan (1804)
- Imperial Kazan University established
- Molotschna founded; largest Russian Mennonite colony
- Moscow Armenian Cemetery founded
- Mtiuleti rebellion
- Kingdom of Imereti becomes a Russian vassal
- Tomsk Governorate established

== Births ==
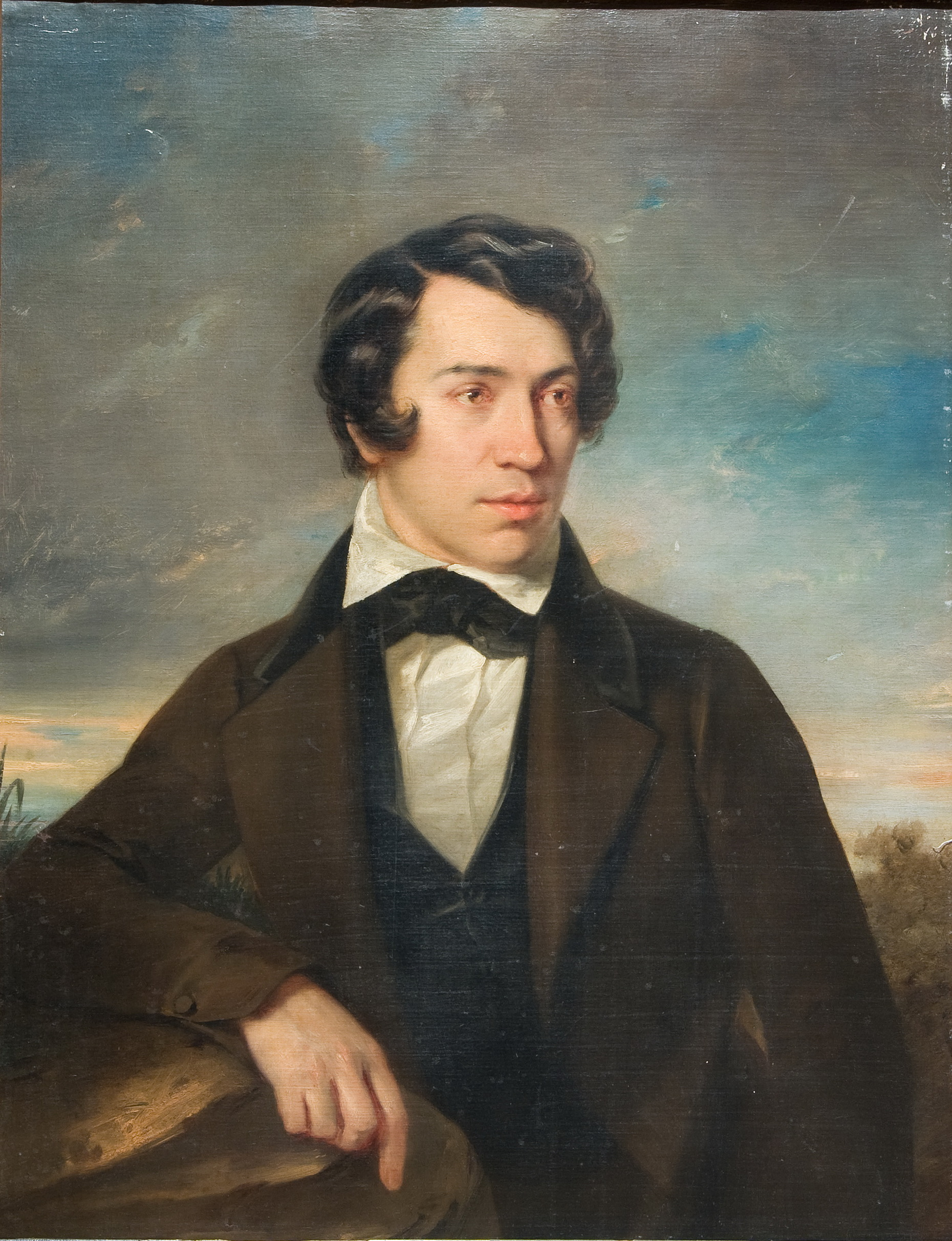
Alexei Stepanovich Khomyakov (1842 self-portrait)

- Alexander Bantyshev, tenor opera singer, composer (d. 1860)
- Aleksander Chodźko, poet, Iranologist, and Slavist (d. 1891)
- Dorothea de Ficquelmont, writer and salonist (d. 1863)
- Mikhail Glinka, Russian composer and founder of the Russian nationalist school of classical music. (d. 1857)
- Aleksey Khomyakov, theologian, philosopher, poet and amateur artist; co-founded the Slavophile movement. (d. 1860)
- Mykhailo Maksymovych, botanist, historian, and writer (d. 1873)
- Mykola Markevych, historian, ethnographer (d. 1860)
- Nikolai Melgunov, writer, translator, and music critic (d. 1867)
- Pavel Petrovich Melnikov - Transport Minister, important in early railroad construction (d. 1880)
- Józef Mianowski - Polish doctor, medical researcher, academic administrator (d. 1879)
- Lyubov Mlotkovskaya - actress (d. 1866)
- Nikolai Nadezhdin - literary critic, ethnographer (d. 1856)
- Carl Timoleon von Neff - Baltic German artist (d. 1877)
- Aleksandr Nikitenko - Ukrainian literary historian, professor, imperial censor, and diarist (d. 1877)
- Grigol Orbeliani - Georgian poet; imperial general and governor (d. 1883)
- Alexander Polezhayev - poet (d. 1838)
- Yakov Rostovtsev - general, helped draft regulations to emancipate the serfs (d. 1860)
- Gordiy Sablukov - Islamist and translator (d. 1880)
- Judah Idel Scherschewsky - Lithuanian Jewish Talmudist and Hebraist (d. 1866)
- Gregory Shuvalov - aristocrat and officer; Catholic convert
- Eduard de Stoeckl - diplomat (d. 1892)
- Alexander Arkadyevich Suvorov - general, diplomat, and administrator
- Ekaterina Telesheva - ballerina (d. 1857)
- Sofya Urusova - lady-in-waiting, favorite of Nicholas I (d. 1889)
- Porphyrius Uspensky - theologian, orientalist, archaeologist (d. 1885)
- Nikolay Yevdokimov - general; responsible for Circassian genocide

== Deaths ==
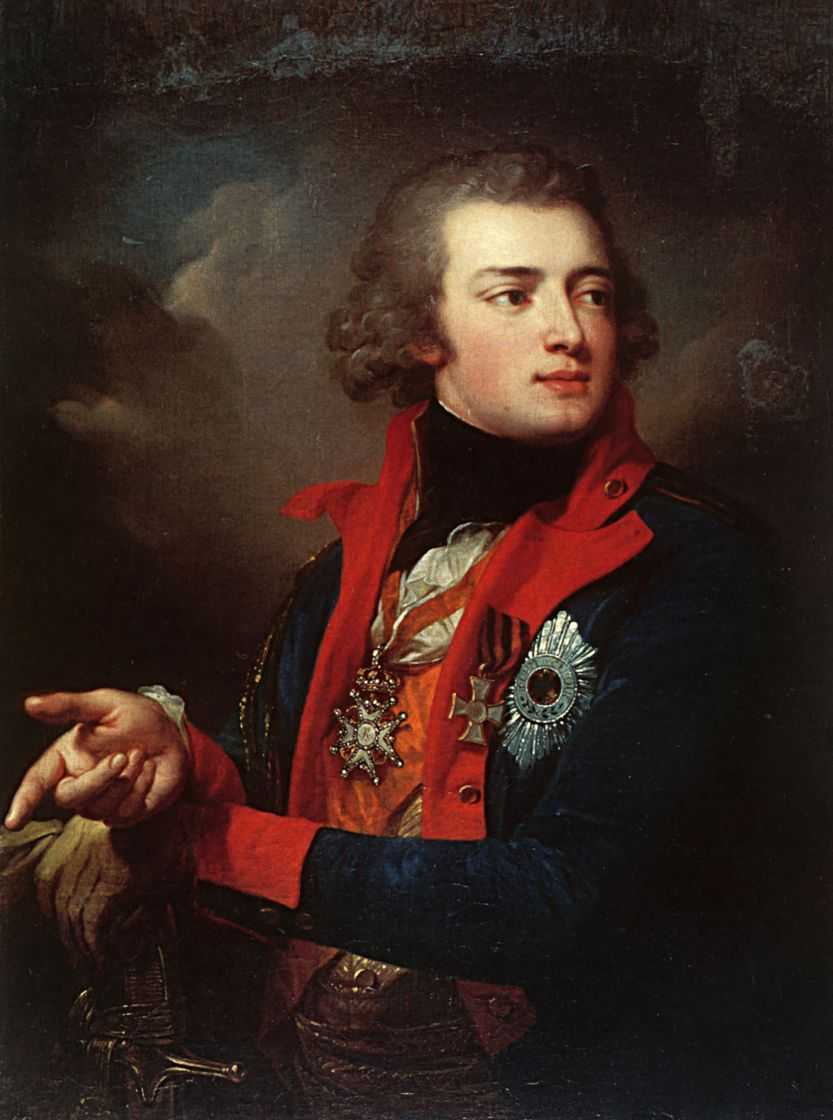
Valerian Zubov (1796)

- Ivan Khandoshkin, violinist and composer (b. 1727)
- Anna Matyushkina, courtier (b. 1722)
- Valentin Musin-Pushkin, general and administrator (b. 1735)
- Maxim Rehbinder, general (b. 1730)
- Semyon Shchedrin, landscape painter (b. 1745)
- Valerian Zubov, general (b. 1771)
