= 1865 in Russia =

- Decades: 1840s; 1850s; 1860s; 1870s; 1880s
- See also: History of Russia; Timeline of Russian history; List of years in Russia

Events from the year 1865 in Russia.

== Incumbents ==
- Monarch – Alexander II

== Events ==
- The Saint Petersburg Zoological Garden (later Leningrad Zoo) is founded by Sofia and Julius Gerhardt in Alexander Park, Saint Petersburg.
- Russian forces capture the Central Asian city of Tashkent, then part of the Khanate of Kokand. At the time, Tashkent had about 70,000 inhabitants and was a major centre of trade with Russia.
- Author Leo Tolstoy begins publishing his historical novel War and Peace in serial form in the periodical Russkiy Vestnik under the title 1805.

== Births ==
19 January – Valentin Serov, painter (d. 1911).

10 August – Aleksandr Glazunov, composer (d. 1936).

14 August – Dmitry Sergeyevich Merezhkovsky, author (d. 1941).
