= 1870 in Russia =

- Decades: 1850s; 1860s; 1870s; 1880s; 1890s
- See also: History of Russia; Timeline of Russian history; List of years in Russia

Events from the year 1870 in Russia.

== Incumbents ==
- Monarch – Alexander II

== Events ==
- the Baltic Railway Company opens the 400 km (250 mi) long Saint Petersburg–Tallinn–Paldiski railway line.
- Perm Opera and Ballet Theatre
- The Russian Tax Debate of 1870–1871

== Births ==
- April 22 - Vladimir Lenin
- May 29 - Nikolay Bauman
- October 10 - Ivan Bunin
- February 17 - Georgy Gapon

== Deaths ==
- May 2 – Grand Duke Alexander Alexandrovich of Russia (b. 1869)
