= Russian Orthodox diocese of Vladivostok =

Diocese of Vladivostok Владивостокская епархия
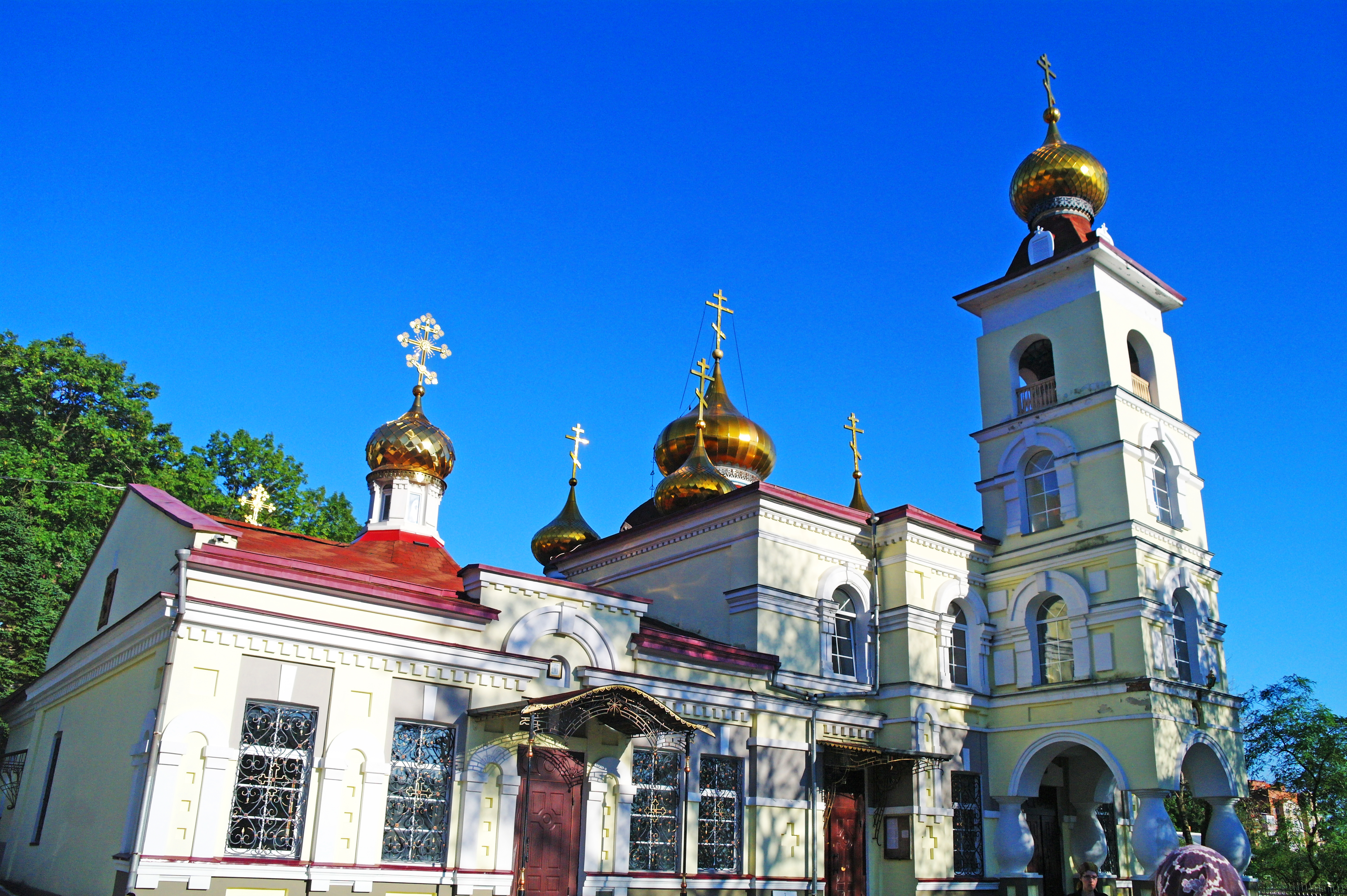
- Nicholas Cathedral in Vladivostok

Location
- Territory: 169,000 sqm
- Deaneries: 9
- Headquarters: Vladivostok

Statistics
- Parishes: 180 (2015)

Information
- Denomination: Eastern Orthodox
- Sui iuris church: Russian Orthodox Church
- Established: 4 June 1898; 31 January 1991
- Cathedral: Nicholas Cathedral
- Language: Church Slavonic

Current leadership
- Governance: Eparchy
- Bishop: Vladimir Samokhin since 28 December 2018

Website
- www.vladivostok-eparhia.ru

Diocese of Vladivostok (Russian: Владивостокская епархия) is a diocese (Eparchy) of the Russian Orthodox Church, uniting parishes and monasteries in the western part of the Primorsky Krai (within the boundaries of the cities of Vladivostok, Artyomov, Dalnerechensk, Lesozavodsk, Ussuriysk, as well as Kirovsky, Krasnoarmeysky, Mikhailovsky, Nadezhdinsky, Oktyabrsky, Pozharsky, Pokrovsky, Spassky, Khankaisky, Khasansky, Khorolsky, Chernigovsky Districts). It is part of the Primorsky Metropolis.

The ruling bishop of the Vladivostok diocese since December 28, 2018 is Metropolitan of Vladivostok and Primorsky Vladimir (Samokhin). The vicar of the Vladivostok diocese is Bishop Innokenty (Erokhin) of Ussuri.

== History ==
The diocese was created on June 4, 1898, after the division of the Diocese of Kamchatka into Diocese of Blagoveshchensk and Diocese of Vladivostok.

In the summer of 1917, Archbishop of Vladivostok Eusebius (Nikolsky) left for Moscow to participate in the 1917–18 Local Council of the Russian Orthodox Church.

In November 1917, the Russian Civil War began, as a result of which Archbishop Eusebius did not return to Vladivostok. In June 1918, the power of the Soviets was overthrown. In December 1918, Bishop Mikhail (Bogdanov) of Cheboksary took control of the Vladivostok diocese. According to some sources, he ruled the diocese until 1922, according to others, in 1920-1922 Mark (Bakaldin) was Bishop of Vladivostok.

The Vladivostok diocese practically ceased to exist in the early 1930s. Since 1946, the newly opened parishes of the Primorsky Krai were included in the Khabarovsk and Vladivostok diocese, which in 1949-1988 was temporarily governed by the bishops of the Irkutsk and Chita diocese.

The diocese was restored by the decision of the Holy Synod of the Russian Orthodox Church on January 31, 1991. In December 1991, there were 15 parishes served by 15 priests. In the following years, the number of new or reactivated parishes systematically increased. Monasteries were also reopened - the female Ussuri Monastery of the Nativity of the Mother of God in 1993 and the male Ussuri Monastery of the Holy Trinity and St. Nicholas in 1995. According to data from 2006, the eparchy had 88 parishes, which included 110 churches and chapels; 124 priests conducted pastoral work in its area. In the years 2003–2019, the eparchy also included the parish of the Holy Trinity in Pyongyang (the only Orthodox parish in North Korea).

On July 27, 2011, the Nakhodka and Arsenyev dioceses were separated from the Vladivostok diocese. On October 6, 2011, the Vladivostok, Nakhodka and Arsenyevsk dioceses were included in the newly formed Primorsky Metropolis.

== Bishops ==
Bishops who headed the diocese:

- January 5, 1899 - 1920 - Eusebius (Nikolsky)
- December 1918 - October 1922 - Mikhail (Bogdanov)
- 1922 - Pavel (Vvedensky) temporary, Bishop of Nikolsko-Ussuriysk
- 1924 - ? Joasaph (Ragozin)
- November 13, 1925 - September 15, 1927 - Cyprian (Komarovsky)
- September 1927 - June 1928 - Nifont (Fomin)
- 1928-1929 - Panteleimon (Maksunov)
- 1929-1930 - Mark (Bogolyubov)
- July 8, 1930 - 1932 - Barsanuphius (Luzin)
- 1931-1932 - German (Kokkel) temporary, Bishop of Nikolsko-Ussuriysk
- January 31, 1991 - August 12, 1992 - Nikolai (Shkrumko)
- September 21, 1992 - December 28, 2018 - Veniamin (Pushkar)
- December 28, 2018 – present: Vladimir (Samokhin)
