= 1858 in Russia =

- Decades: 1830s; 1840s; 1850s; 1860s; 1870s
- See also: History of Russia; Timeline of Russian history; List of years in Russia

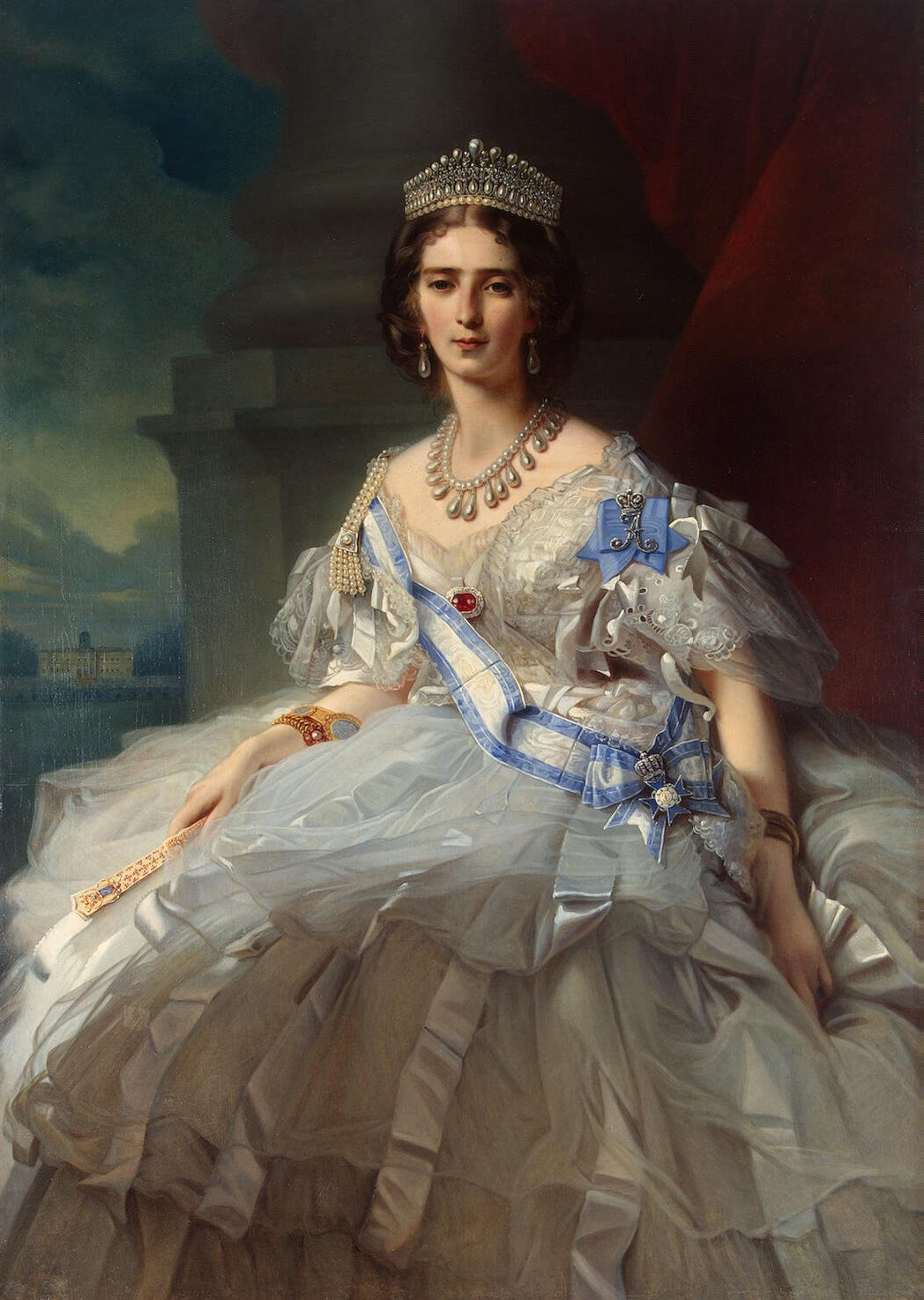
Princess Tatiana Alexandrovna Yusupova, 1858

Events from the year 1858 in Russia

== Incumbents ==
- Monarch – Alexander II

== Events ==
- May 28 - Treaty of Aigun between the Russian Empire and China
- June 10 - Establishment of Bolhrad High School in Moldavia
- Establishment of Gorky Library (Ryazan)
- Vodka protests of 1858–1859
- Establishment of Ikaalinen
- Creation of Esik
- Establishment of Khabarovsk
- Creation of Krymsk
- Establishment of Olga
- Creation of the Diocese of Blagoveshchensk
- Establishment of Talgar
- Creation of K. Rudzki i S-ka (in Warsaw)
- July 11 – Saint Isaac's Cathedral in Saint Petersburg is consecrated

== Births ==
- Sara Adler
- Hans William von Fersen
- Roman Klein
- Konstantin Konstantinovich
- Alexander Nikolsky
- Nicolas Notovitch
- Catherine Radziwill
- Alexander Ragoza
- Vladimir Serbsky
- Ludwig von Struve
- Eduard von Toll
- Alexei Trupp

== Deaths ==
- Zygmunt Kurnatowski
- Alexander Andreyevich Ivanov
- Konstantin Poltoratsky
- Evdokiya Rostopchina
- Osip Ivanovich Senkovsky
- Alexander Ulybyshev
- Yevgeny Golovin
