= 1851 in Russia =

- Decades: 1830s; 1840s; 1850s; 1860s; 1870s
- See also: History of Russia; Timeline of Russian history; List of years in Russia

Events from the year 1851 in Russia.

Dates in this article are given in the Old Style (Julian) calendar unless otherwise noted. (Note: In the 19th century, Old Style (Julian) dates used in the Russian Empire were 12 days behind the New Style (Gregorian) dates used in most of Western Europe.)

== Incumbents ==
- Emperor – Nicholas I
- Heir apparent – Tsarevich Alexander Nikolayevich
- State Chancellor and Foreign Minister – Karl Nesselrode

== Events ==
=== February ===
- 15 February (O.S. 3 February) – Nicholas I issues a decree authorising surveys for the construction of the Saint Petersburg–Warsaw Railway.

=== July ===
- 25 July – The Treaty of Kuldja (Ghulja) is signed with Qing China, opening Kuldja (Ghulja) and Chuguchak (Tacheng) to Russian trade and permitting Russian consuls there. The seventeen-article treaty was signed for Russia by Yegor Kovalevsky and for China by Yishan and Buyantai.

=== November ===
- 1 November (N.S. 13 November) – The Saint Petersburg–Moscow Railway officially opens. The first public train carries 192 passengers and completes the journey in 21 hours 45 minutes. At 604 versts (about 644 km) it was the longest double-track railway in the world at the time; its terminal stations were designed by Konstantin Thon. The line was renamed the Nikolaev Railway in 1855.

=== Undated ===
- The ninth revision (poll-tax census, revizskaya skazka), begun in 1850, is carried out across the empire in 1850–1851.
- Siemens & Halske makes its first delivery to Russia, supplying 75 recording (pointer) telegraph instruments for the Saint Petersburg–Moscow telegraph line.
- Caucasian War: over the winter of 1851–1852 Russian forces tighten their control around Greater Chechnya. In November 1851 the Avar leader Hadji Murad defects from Imam Shamil to the Russians.

== Culture ==
- Ivan Turgenev writes the one-act play A Provincial Lady.
- Alexander Ostrovsky's play The Poor Bride, his second major play, is written; it was published in the journal Moskvityanin in 1852 and first staged at the Maly Theatre in 1853.
- Pavel Fedotov paints the repeat version of The Major Makes a Proposal (Inspecting a Bride in a Merchant's House), now in the State Russian Museum.
- Mikhail Glinka completes his Spanish Overture No. 2, Summer Night in Madrid.

== Births ==
- 12 February (O.S. 31 January) – Anna Yesipova, pianist and teacher (died 1914)
- 22 March (O.S. 10 March) – Aleksey Kivshenko, painter (died 1895)
- 2 April (O.S. 21 March) – Adolph Brodsky, violinist (died 1929)
- 3 June (O.S. 22 May) – Kazimir Barantsevich, writer (died 1927)
- 8 September – Maksim Kovalevsky, jurist and sociologist (died 1916)
- 20 November (O.S. 8 November) – Mikhail Albov, writer (died 1911)

== Deaths ==
- 25 February – Nikolai Islenev, general (born 1785)
- 6 March (O.S. 22 February) – Alexander Alyabyev, composer (born 1787)
- 12 March – Jan Barszczewski, Polish-Belarusian writer (born c. 1781)
- 23 April (O.S. 11 April) – Mikhail Lazarev, admiral and Antarctic explorer (born 1788)
