= 1853 in Russia =

- Decades: 1830s; 1840s; 1850s; 1860s; 1870s
- See also: History of Russia; Timeline of Russian history; List of years in Russia

Events from the year 1853 in Russia

== Incumbents ==
- Monarch – Nicholas I

== Events ==
- Battle of Akhalzic

== Births ==
- Lidija Figner, revolutionary and a prominent member of the Narodniks (died 1920)

== Deaths ==
- Elena Yezhova
