= 1758 in Russia =

Events from 1758 in Russia

== Incumbents ==
- Monarch – Elizabeth

== Events ==
- January 22 – Seven Years' War – 34,000 Russian soldiers capture Königsberg in East Prussia (modern-day Kaliningrad).
- February 14 – Vice Chancellor Aleksey Bestuzhev-Ryumin was removed from office.
- August 25 – Seven Years' War – Wilhelm Fermor's troops are defeated by Frederick near the Oder during the Battle of Zorndorf.
- Seven Years' War – Russia made a failed attempt to take Kolberg in Pomerania (modern-day Kołobrzeg, Poland).

== Births ==
- Euphrosinia Kolyupanovskaya, courtier (d. 1855)
- Ekaterina Orlova (courtier), courtier (d. 1781)

== Deaths ==
- July 14 - Abrahaam Kaauw (Boerhaave), Russian medic, personal physician of the Empress (b.1715)
- August 17 – Stepan Fyodorovich Apraksin, Russian soldier (b. 1702)
- September 5 – Dmitry Ivanovich Vinogradov, Russian chemist (b. c. 1720)
