= Lyubov Mlotkovskaya =

Russian stage actor (1804–1866)

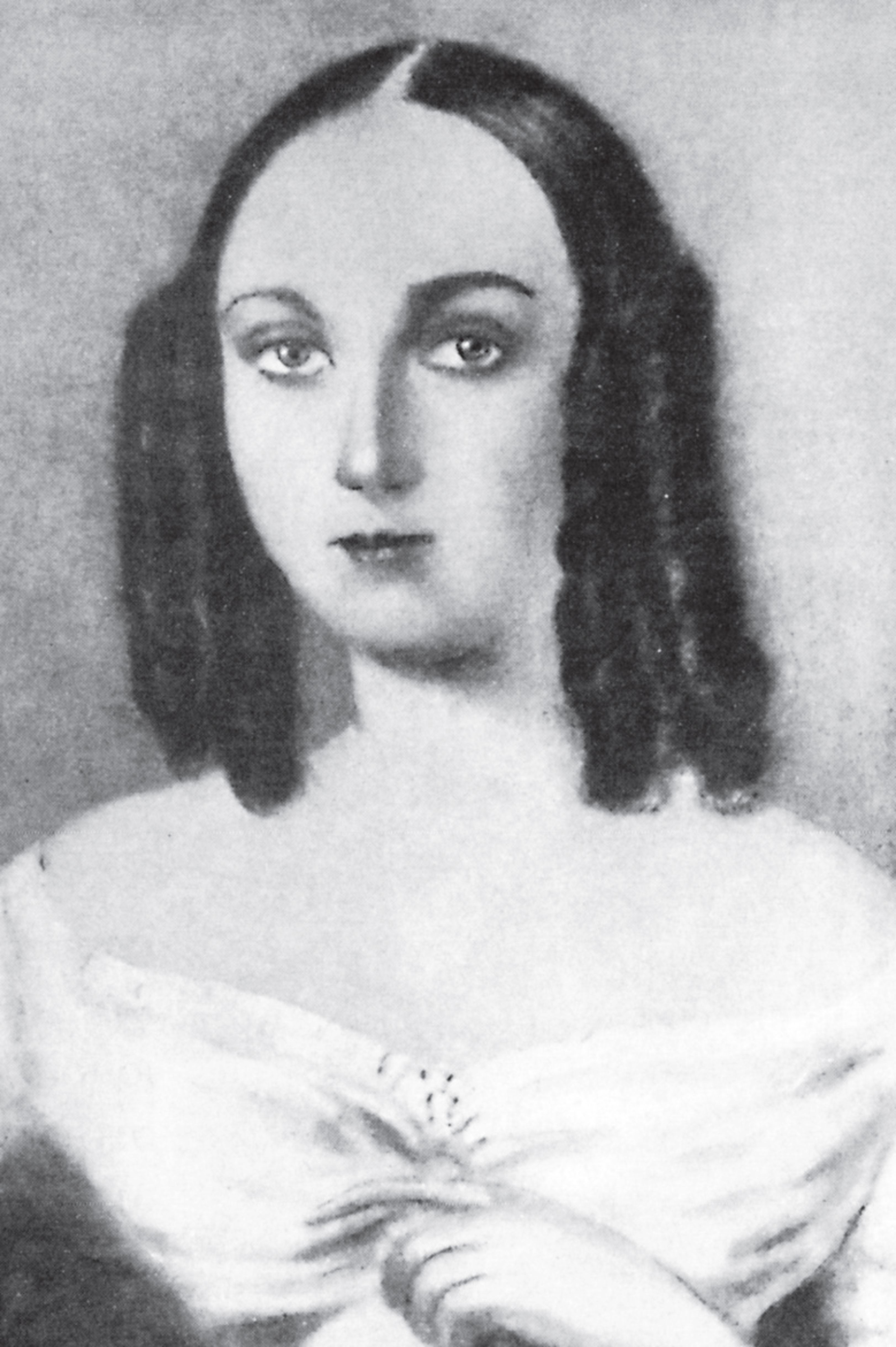
Lyubov Ivanovna Mlotkovskaya

Lyubov Ivanovna Mlotkovskaya (Russian: Любовь Ивановна Млотковская; 1804–1866) was a Russian stage actress. She was engaged in a number of provincial theatres and travelling theatres in 1823–1866, most notably the Kharkov theatre, and played an considerable part in Russian theatre life during the first half of the 19th century. She has been referred to as the most popular actress of the provincial theatre in the 1830s and as the greatest actress of the provincial theatre of her time. She is most known for her role as Ophelia, which she famously created in Kiev and Kharkov 1838–1842, but she was also known to favor and benefit the works of Shchepkin and Mochalov at the Russian stage.
