= 1859 in Russia =

- Decades: 1830s; 1840s; 1850s; 1860s; 1870s
- See also: History of Russia; Timeline of Russian history; List of years in Russia

Events from the year 1859 in Russia

== Political developments ==
The conclusion of the Paris Secret Treaty. In March 1859, Russia and France signed an agreement under which Russia pledged to remain neutral in the event of a war between France and Austria, as well as to keep Prussia from interfering in the conflict on the side of Austria. The end of the Caucasian War. In August 1859, Imam Shamil was defeated and captured on conditions of honorable surrender in the mountain village of Gunib. A month later, Shamil was received by Emperor Alexander II, who by a personal decree granted him hereditary Russian nobility.

== Economic developments ==
Reorganization of the banking system. The authorities stopped issuing mortgage loans to landlords, established a new State-owned Bank, and converted demand deposits from old banks into bonds with a 37-year maturity. Changes in taxation. The poll tax was abolished, the apartment tax was introduced, and an increased expansion and increase in indirect taxation began. Social events Mass demonstrations of peasants against drinking dues (the "sober movement"). Peasants created temperance societies, decided not to drink wine at village gatherings, and violators were subjected to corporal punishment and monetary fines. Peasant unrest. In 1859, 90 peasant riots were registered.

== Cultural events ==
Publication of I. A. Goncharov's novel "Oblomov". Creation of Sunday public schools in Russia. This form of education began to attract an increasing number of students, and in the early 60s of the XIX century, Sunday schools were organized not only in metropolitan and provincial cities, but also in counties, as well as in villages. 

- Foundation of the Russian Musical Society in St. Petersburg (founded by A. G. Rubinstein)

== Incumbents ==
- Monarch – Alexander II

== Events ==
- The Vodka protests of 1858–1859
- Iskra (magazine)
- Russian Musical Society
- Vilnius–Kaunas Railway
- Composer Pyotr Ilyich Tchaikovsky graduates from the Imperial School of Jurisprudence

== Births ==
- January 27 [O.S. January 15] - Pavel Milyukov, Russian historian and politician (d.1943)
- March 2 [O.S. February 18] - Sholem Aleichem, Russian-Jewish author and playwright (d. 1916)
- March 16 [O.S. March 4] – Alexander Stepanovich Popov, Russian physicist (d. 1906 [O.S. 1905])
- April 26 [O.S. 14 April] - Grand Duke Nicholas Mikhailovich of Russia, Russian grand duke (d. 1919)
- September 24 – Radko Dimitriev, Bulgarian and Russian general (d. 1918)

== Deaths ==
- May 12 – Sergey Aksakov, Russian writer, memoirist and literary critic (b. 1791)
