= 1869 in Russia =

- Decades: 1840s; 1850s; 1860s; 1870s; 1880s
- See also: History of Russia; Timeline of Russian history; List of years in Russia

Events from the year 1869 in Russia.

== Incumbents ==
- Monarch – Alexander II

== Events ==
- Aktobe foundation
- Amvrosiivka
- Donetsk foundation
- Dzhevanshirsky Uyezd
- Lazarevskoye Microdistrict
- Raduń Yeshiva foundation
- Lanskaya railway station
- Treaty with Hawaii (Hawaiian Kingdom Treaty)

== Births ==
- January 21 – Grigori Rasputin, mystic (d. 1916)
- February 26 – Nadezhda Krupskaya, Marxist revolutionary, Vladimir Lenin's wife (d. 1939)
- June 7 – Grand Duke Alexander Alexandrovich of Russia (d. 1870)
- October 7 - Grand Duke Sergei Mikhailovich of Russia (d. 1918)

== Deaths ==
- Jan 17 - Alexander Sergeyevich Dargomzhsky (b. 1814)
