= 1867 in Russia =

- Decades: 1840s; 1850s; 1860s; 1870s; 1880s
- See also: History of Russia; Timeline of Russian history; List of years in Russia

Events from the year 1867 in Russia.

== Incumbents ==
- Monarch – Alexander II

== Events ==
- Alaska Purchase
- Berdichev machine-building plant
- Moscow Circus on Tsvetnoy Boulevard

== Deaths ==
- April 22 - Alexander Petrov, chess player (b. 1794)
