= 1860 in Russia =

- Decades: 1840s; 1850s; 1860s; 1870s; 1880s
- See also: History of Russia; Timeline of Russian history; List of years in Russia

Events from the year 1860 in Russia

== Incumbents ==
- Monarch – Alexander II

== Events ==
- Founding of the Moscow School for the Deaf
- Founding of Vladivostok
- Convention of Beijing
- St. Petersburg River Yacht Club
- Rēzekne I–Daugavpils Railway
- Dmitry Milyutin was appointed deputy war minister
- Circassian Majlis
- State Bank of the Russian Empire

== Births ==
- 29 January [O.S. 17 January] 1860 - Anton Chekhov, Russian playwright and short story writer. (d. 1904)
- 1 April 1860 - Sergey Reformatsky, Russian chemist. (d. 1934)
- 22 May 1860 - Mikhail Grigoryevich Pervushin (ru), Russian Imperial Army general-major, commander of the 1st Nevsky Infantry Regiment. (d. 1917)
- 14 July 1860 - Vasily Velichko, Russian dramatist, poet, editor, theatre critic, publicist, political activist. (d. 1904)
- 28 July 1860 - Grand Duchess Anastasia Mikhailovna of Russia, member of the House of Romanov, Grand Duchess of Russia and Grand Duchess of Mecklenburg-Schwerin. (d. 1922)
- 30 August [O.S. 18 August] 1860 - Isaac Levitan, Russian painter. (d.1900)
- 27 November 1860 - Victor Ewald, Russian engineer, architect, composer. (d. 1935)
- 23 December [O.S. 11 December] 1860 - Nikolai Ottovich von Essen, Russian admiral. (d. 1915)

== Deaths ==
- 18 February [O.S. 6 February] 1860 - Yakov Rostovtsev, Russian general, reformer and principal drafter of the 1861 Emancipation reform. (b. 1804)
- 5 October [O.S. 23 September] 1860 - Aleksey Khomyakov, Russian theologian, philosopher, poet and amateur artist who co-founded the Slavophile movement. (b. 1804)
- 1 November 1860 - Alexandra Feodorovna, Princess Charlotte of Prussia and Empress of Russia. (b. 1798)
