= 1852 in Russia =

- Decades: 1830s; 1840s; 1850s; 1860s; 1870s
- See also: History of Russia; Timeline of Russian history; List of years in Russia

Events from the year 1852 in Russia

== Incumbents ==
- Monarch – Nicholas I

== Events ==
- February 17, Hermitage Museum was opened to public in Saint Petersburg that is designed by Nikolay Yefimov and Vasily Stasov.
- The second phase of the Onega Canal construction was completed
- Simon Janashia Museum of Georgia
- The first telegraph station was opened in October 1. Marking the transition from Optical telegraph to Electrical telegraph.

== Births ==
- Vera Figner, Russian political activist, (d.1942)
- Nikolay Garin-Mikhaylovsky, Russian writer and engineer, (d.1906)
- Walter Winans, Russian gold metalist for shooting, (d. 1920)
- Alexey Kuropatkin, Russian Imperial Minister of War, (d. 1925)
- Dmitry Anuchin, Russian anthropologist and ethnographist (d.1923)

== Deaths ==
- Nikolai Gogol a major Russian writer died in February 1852.
- Vasily Zhukovsy a poet and translator.
- Fabian Gottlieb a Russian Admiral, cartographer and explorer died in January 1852.
- Karn Bryullov a famous Russian painter.
