= 1855 in Russia =

- Decades: 1830s; 1840s; 1850s; 1860s; 1870s
- See also: History of Russia; Timeline of Russian history; List of years in Russia

Events from the year 1855 in Russia.

== Incumbents ==
- Monarch – Nicholas I (until March 2), Alexander II (after March 2)

== Events ==
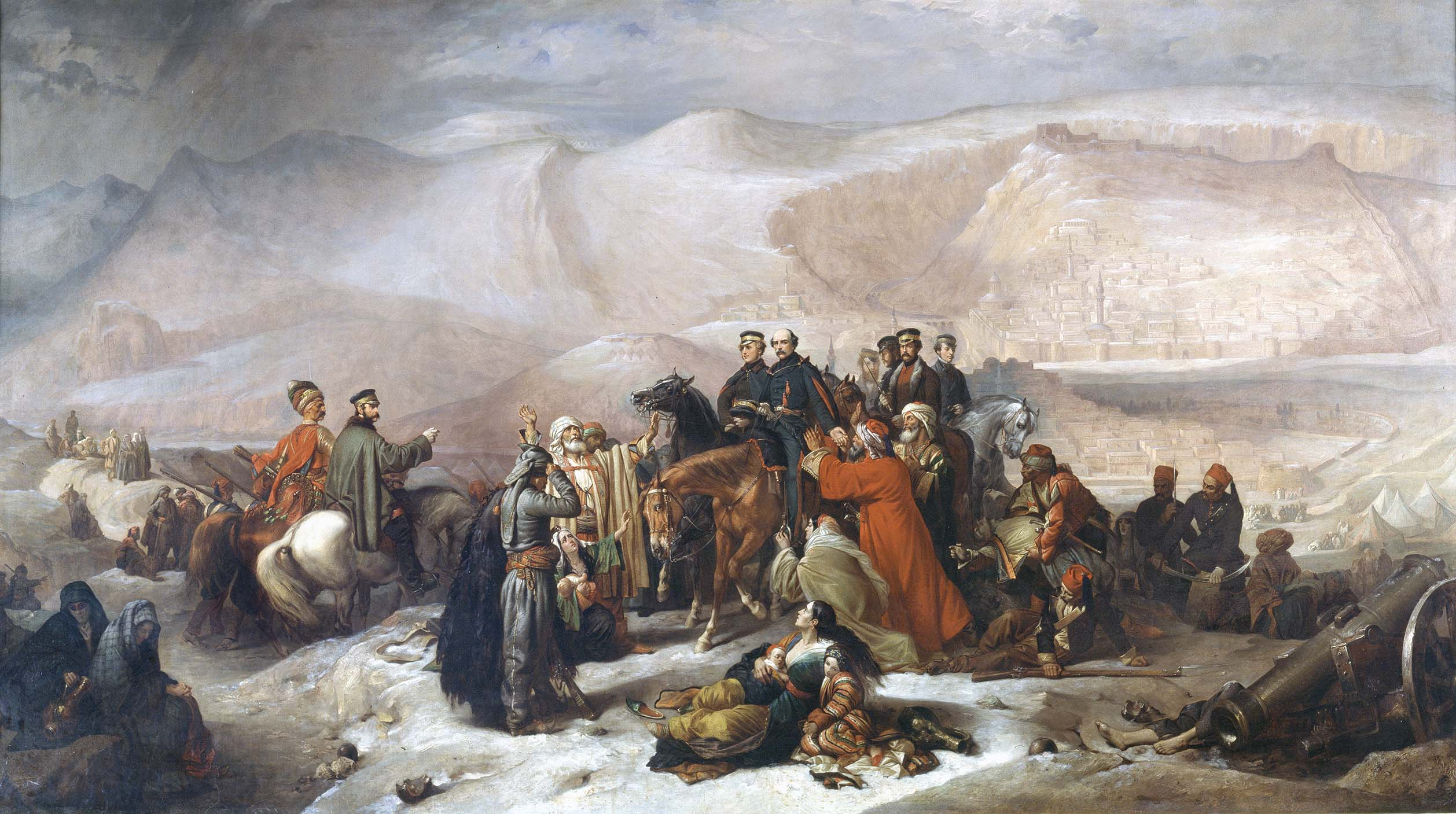
The Capitulation of Kars by Thomas Jones Barker, 1860

- 2 March - Alexander II becomes emperor after the death of his father, Nicholas I.
- 7 February - The Simoda Agreement was signed between Russian Empire and Japan, which consolidated Russian control over the Kuril Islands.
- 29 November The Siege of Kars ends in a Russian victory.

== Births ==
- April 5 - Vsevolod Garshin, writer, poet
- April 17 - Semyon Vengerov, literary critic, historian
- June 23 - Lidiya Tseraskaya, astronomer
- September 1 - Innokenty Annensky, writer, dramaturge
- October 27 - Ivan Michurin, biologist

== Deaths ==
- March 2 - Nicholas I of Russia, monarch (b. 1796)
- July 15 - Euphrosinia Kolyupanovskaya, courtier (b. 1758)
