= 1862 in Russia =

- Decades: 1840s; 1850s; 1860s; 1870s; 1880s
- See also: History of Russia; Timeline of Russian history; List of years in Russia

Events from the year 1862 in Russia.

== Incumbents ==
- Monarch – Alexander II

== Events ==
- The Millennium of Russia is erected
- Congregation of the Sisters of Our Lady of Mercy
- Moscow Yaroslavskaya railway station
- Saint Petersburg–Warsaw Railway
- New Michael Palace

== Births ==
- Rosa Pavlovsky de Rosemberg, Russian-born Argentine physician (d. 1936)
