= Schereschewsky =

Schereschewsky, also spelled as Scherschewsky or Scherschewski (Yiddish: שערשעווסקי), is a surname, a German-language respelling of the Polish Jewish surname Szereszewski. Notable people with this surname include:

- Judah Idel Scherschewsky (1804–1866), Lithuanian Talmudist
- Samuel Isaac Joseph Schereschewsky (1831–1906), Lithuanian-born Anglican bishop
- Zebi Hirsch Scherschewski (1840–1909), Hebrew-language writer
