= Rosemberg =

Rosemberg can be both a masculine given name and a surname. Notable people and fictional characters with the name include:

== Real people ==
- Rosemberg Pabón, Colombian political scientist
- Rosa Pavlovsky de Rosemberg, Russian-Argentine physician

== Fictional characters ==
- Billy Rosemberg, in the children's animated show Max & Ruby

== See also ==
- Rosenberg (disambiguation)
