= 1854 in Russia =

- Decades: 1830s; 1840s; 1850s; 1860s; 1870s
- See also: History of Russia; Timeline of Russian history; List of years in Russia

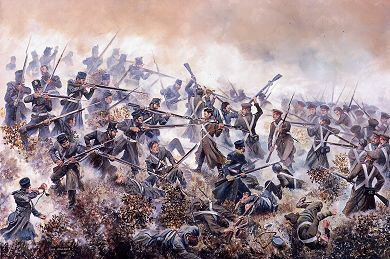
Battle of Inkermann by David Rowlands

Events from the year 1854 in Russia

== Incumbents ==
- Monarch – Nicholas I

== Events ==
- February 27 — Britain sends Russia an ultimatum to withdraw from the Romanian provinces Moldavia and Wallachia.
- March 27 — Crimean War: The United Kingdom declares war on Russia.
- March 28 — France declares war on Russia.
- June 21 — Battle of Bomarsund in Åland.
- August 16 — Battle of Bomarsund: Russian troops in the island of Bomarsund in Åland surrender to French–British troops.
- September 20 — Battle of the Alma: Menshikov's forces unsuccessfully defend a height above the Alma River from an allied infantry advance commanded by de Saint-Arnaud, Suleiman Pasha, and Lord Raglan.

== Births ==
- July 7 – Nikolai Alexandrovich Morozov, poet, scientist and revolutionary (d. 1946)
