= Szereszewski =

Szereszewski, Szereszowski, feminine: Szereszewska, Szereszowska is a Polish-language toponymic surname of Ashkenazi Jewish origin derived from the location named Szereszów, now Sharashova, Belarus. It may be variously transliterated as Shereshevsky, Schereschewsky, etc. A variant is Shershevsky. Notable people with the surname include:

- David Shereshevsky, birth name of David Sherman (rabbi) (1909–2002), South African and American rabbi
- Lola Szereszewska (1895–1943), Polish-Jewish poet and journalist
- Mikhail Shereshevsky, Belarussian chess master and coach, chess book writer
- Nikolai Shereshevsky (1885–1961), Russian and Soviet endocrinologist, the namesake of the Shereshevsky–Turner syndrome
- Pyotr Shereshevsky (born 1972), Russian theater and film director, screenwriter, playwright, and novelist
- Rafał Szereszowski (1869-1948), Polish banker, senator
- Rena Shereshevskaya (born 1954), Russian and French pianist and piano teacher
- Solomon Shereshevsky (1886–1958), Russian mnemonist
- Yakov Shereshevsky (1894–1979), Soviet general of medical service

== See also ==
- Szarszewski
- Sieroszewski
