= 1863 in Russia =

- Decades: 1840s; 1850s; 1860s; 1870s; 1880s
- See also: History of Russia; Timeline of Russian history; List of years in Russia

1863 in Russia (Russian Empire under Tsar Alexander II) was marked by significant internal and international developments, primarily dominated by the outbreak and early suppression of a major rebellion in the western territories.

== Incumbents ==
- Monarch – Alexander II

== Events ==
- Apraksin Dvor
- Pavel Military School
- Vremya (magazine)
- Tolstoy took five years (1863–1869) to complete his epic.
- The January insurrection.

== Births ==
- Grand Duke George Mikhailovich of Russia (1863–1919)
- Charles Michael, Duke of Mecklenburg, heir presumptive to the Grand Duchy of Mecklenburg-Strelitz
- Nestor Kotlyarevsky, author, literary critic
- Sergei Nikolaevich Trubetskoy, religious philosopher
- Konstantin Alekseevich Satunin, zoologist
- Aleksandr Golovin (artist)
- Konstantin Stanislavski, Russian theatre practitioner
- Basil Belavin was born in 1865.

== Deaths ==
- Nikolai Turczaninow, botanist
- Mikhail Shchepkin, actor
- Matvey Dmitriev-Mamonov, Major-General
- Jekaterina Saltykov, courtier (born 1791)
