= 1861 in Russia =

- Decades: 1840s; 1850s; 1860s; 1870s; 1880s
- See also: History of Russia; Timeline of Russian history; List of years in Russia

Events from the year 1861 in Russia

== Incumbents ==
- Monarch – Alexander II

A 1907 painting by Boris Kustodiev depicting the muzhiks listening to the proclamation of the Emancipation Manifesto in 1861

== Events ==
- 27 February – Russian troops fire on a crowd in Warsaw protesting Russian rule, killing 5 protesters.
- 3 March (February 19 O.S.) – Emancipation reform of 1861: Serfdom is abolished.
- 13 March – Tsushima incident: the Russian corvette Posadnik arrives at Tsushima Island in the Korea Strait, Japan, provoking a reaction from the Japan.
- 24 April (N.S.) – Bezdna in Russia is the scene of a peasant uprising; the military open fire and nearly 5000 are killed.
- 21 May – Russian sailors clash with Japanese samurai and farmers at Tsushima island.

== Births ==
- 6 February - Nikolay Zelinsky, chemist
- 12 July - Anton Arensky, composer of Romantic classical music
- 29 October - Andrei Ryabushkin, painter
- 16 November - Arvid Järnefelt, Finnish author (d. 1932)
- 5 December - Konstantin Korovin, impressionist painter

== Deaths ==
- 10 March - Taras Shevchenko, Ukrainian poet and writer
- 29 November - Nikolay Dobrolyubov, philosopher and revolutionary
