= 1864 in Russia =

- Decades: 1840s; 1850s; 1860s; 1870s; 1880s
- See also: History of Russia; Timeline of Russian history; List of years in Russia

In 1864, Russia was at the dawn of the Zemstvo reform, focused on local self-government, which was created during the emancipation reform of 1861. After three years of Alexander II, gentry, peasants, and city dwellers sitting in joint assemblies discussing Russia's economic interests, the new laws officially went into effect this year.

== Churches ==
1864 was also the year that Tsar Alexander II of Russia pushed for the implementation of parish councils and church reform. Alexander II sought out parish councils to improve the overall productivity of the parish clergy but was met with discontent from parishioners since most of their funds went into the renovation of churches. Church councils were formed under the parish but did not directly belong to it. Councils were tasked with the upkeep of church buildings, founding church schools, watching over parish cemeteries, and general charity work of the communities. With a promising start, four years into Alexander II's legislation, around 5,000 councils existed. Interest in the church councils began to decline from 1871-1881 and quickly arose during the years of 1890-1909. It's directly unknown why the increase in councils happened and is a burning question of who revamped the church councils during this time period.

1864 also marks the beginning of the Russian Empire's Circassian Genocide. The Circassian Genocide was the mass killing and deportation of the Circassian's, who were religiously Islamic, from the Russian Empire. For many years prior to 1864, the Circassians refused to succumb to the Christians in the Russian Empire. This caused the Russian Empire to retaliate using military force in order to either convert Circassian's to Christianity through Russification, or if they refused to convert the Russian Empire would either mass deport or murder them. Throughout the entirety of the Circassian Genocide it is estimated that between 800,000 and 1,500,000 Circassian's were murdered or deported.

== Medicine ==
The 1864 Zemstvo legislation was rather unclear, requiring Zemstvos to keep the existing hospitals with a focus on spreading and circulating vaccines; however there was minimal, vague, and obvious information included in the legislation. An example of this is the legislation's mention that local organizations could finance medical institutions if they wanted to, but it was all to their own discretion. A reason behind why the Zemstvo legislation was so vague was because this marked the first time the Russian Empire attempted to put together some type of medical legislation. The Russian Empire had to start from scratch and did not use any models of guidance in trying to create a more unified and structured medical care system.

A major focus of the Zemstvo legislation in 1864 was to focus on building medical care for rural communities in Russia, which were responsible for 90% of the Russian population. Prior to the legislation that was formed in order to aid the rural communities in Russia, there was a very small amount of privatized or government run medical care and the public institutions that were already established were notoriously inadequate and unsuccessful. In the legislation in order to combat labor and supply shortages that caused their medical institutions to be ineffective, the Russian Empire implemented something they called a circuit system. A circuit system in this sense entailed hiring medical physicians who would travel across Russia to provide a single district or village medical care for a few days before leaving to go to another village. This circuit would usually take 30–40 days before returning to the same village. A major factor in why the Russian Empire chose to implement a circuit system compared to a stationary system, which is where a medical institution would be built and have physicians permanently working there, was because a circuit system cost substantially less due to not having to build multiple medical institutions and have to hire and train a massive medical staff for each institution.

== Expansionism ==
In 1864, Russia continued their pursuit of expansion in Central Asia, specifically focusing on expanding into modern-day Kazakhstan. During this time, Russia focused on expansion into Central Asia, due to the fear of British intervention if they attempted to expand into the already established British colonies in India. Using their military command, Russia annexed the Kazakhstan cities of Turkestan City, Aulie Ata (which is now the modern day city of Tarza), and Chimkent. Accompanying this annexation Russia formed a new Turkestan providence in association with their own already established Russian Orenbrug providence's Governorate-General.

== Incumbents ==
- Monarch – Alexander II

== Events ==
- Russia starts the Circassian genocide.
- Tsar Alexander II of Russia legislated church councils.
- Judicial Reform of Alexander II.

== Births ==
- March 13 – Alexej von Jawlensky, Russian expressionist painter (d. 1941)
- May 20 – Vasily Gurko, Russian general (d. 1937)
- October 25 – Alexander Gretchaninov, Russian composer (d. 1956)
- January 22 - Grand Duke Peter Nikolaevich, Russian Gran Duke (d. 1931)
- November 1 - Princess Elisabeth of Hesse and by Rhine (d. 1918)

== Deaths ==
- February 1 - Feodor Kuzmich, Righteous Saint of the Russian Orthodox Church (b. 1776)
