= 1868 in Russia =

- Decades: 1840s; 1850s; 1860s; 1870s; 1880s
- See also: History of Russia; Timeline of Russian history; List of years in Russia

Events from the year 1868 in Russia.

== Incumbents ==
- Monarch – Alexander II

== Events ==
- The Saint Petersburg Declaration of 1868 International treaty is signed.
- The khanate became a vassal of the Russian Empire.
- The siege of Samarkand takes place in modern day Uzbekistan (previously part of the Russian empire) between the fourteenth of June to the eighteenth of June.

== Births ==
- March 28 – Maxim Gorky, writer (d. 1936)
- May 18 – Nicholas II of Russia, (d. 1918)
- August 24 - Egil Eide, Actor and director (d. December 13 1946)
- September 20 – Vera Velichkina, physician, writer and revolutionary (d. 1918)
- October 3 - Gunnar Isachsen, military personnel and explorer (d. December 19 1939)

== Deaths ==
- Maria Meshcherskaya, courtier (b. 1844)
