= 1857 in Russia =

- Decades: 1830s; 1840s; 1850s; 1860s; 1870s
- See also: History of Russia; Timeline of Russian history; List of years in Russia

Events from the year 1857 in Russia

== Incumbents ==
- Monarch – Alexander II

== Events ==
- Franciscan Sisters of the Family of Mary
- Krenholm Manufacturing Company
- Maykop
- Postimees

== Births ==
- 17 September - Konstantin Tsiolkovsky (died 1935)
- 2 January – Stepan Khalturin, Russian revolutionary (d. 1882)
- 4 March – Aleksei Evert, Russian general (d. 1926)

== Deaths ==
- 15 February - Mikhail Glinka, famous composer who is praised as the "Father of Russian Music." (born 1804)
