= 1872 in Russia =

- Decades: 1850s; 1860s; 1870s; 1880s; 1890s
- See also: History of Russia; Timeline of Russian history; List of years in Russia

Events from the year 1872 in Russia.

== Incumbents ==
- Monarch – Alexander II

== Events ==
- A.S. Popov Central Museum of Communications
- Grazhdanin
- Special Tribunal of the Ruling Senate
- Kuopion Lyseon lukio
- Maaninka
- Moscow State Pedagogical University
- Mshak

== Births ==
- Maria Skorsiuk, ballet dancer (died 1901)
