= 1866 in Russia =

- Decades: 1840s; 1850s; 1860s; 1870s; 1880s
- See also: History of Russia; Timeline of Russian history; List of years in Russia

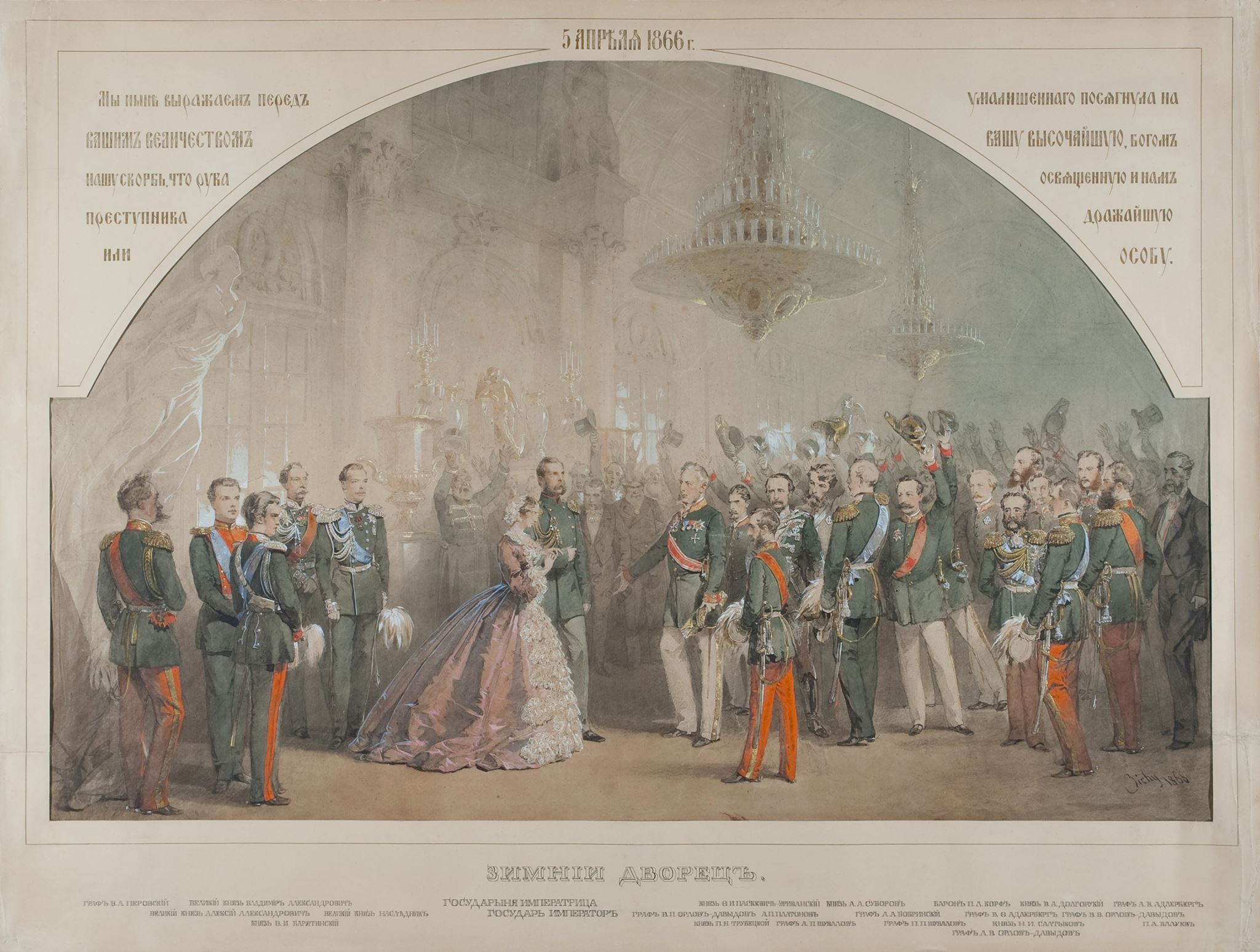
Alexander II's audience after 1866 assassination by M.Zichy (GIM)

Events from the year 1866 in Russia.

== Incumbents ==
- Monarch – Alexander II

== Events ==
- Daugavpils–Indra Railway
- Delo (magazine)
- Ekostrovskaya Volost
- Kalinin Machine-Building Plant
- Moscow Criminal Investigations Department
- South Eastern Railway (Russia)
- Swedish Theatre
- Alexander III marries Maria Sophie Feodorovna of Denmark

== Births ==
- 29 October [O.S. 17 October] 1866 - Dmitri Parsky, general (d. 1921)
- 16 December [O.S. 4 December] 1866 - Wassily Kandinsky, artist. (d. 1944)

== Deaths ==
- 19 December [O.S. 7 December] 1866 - Mikhail Petrashevsky, Russian revolutionary and Utopian theorist. (b. 1821)
- Maria Ikonina, ballerina. (b. 1788)
