= 1856 in Russia =

- Decades: 1830s; 1840s; 1850s; 1860s; 1870s
- See also: History of Russia; Timeline of Russian history; List of years in Russia

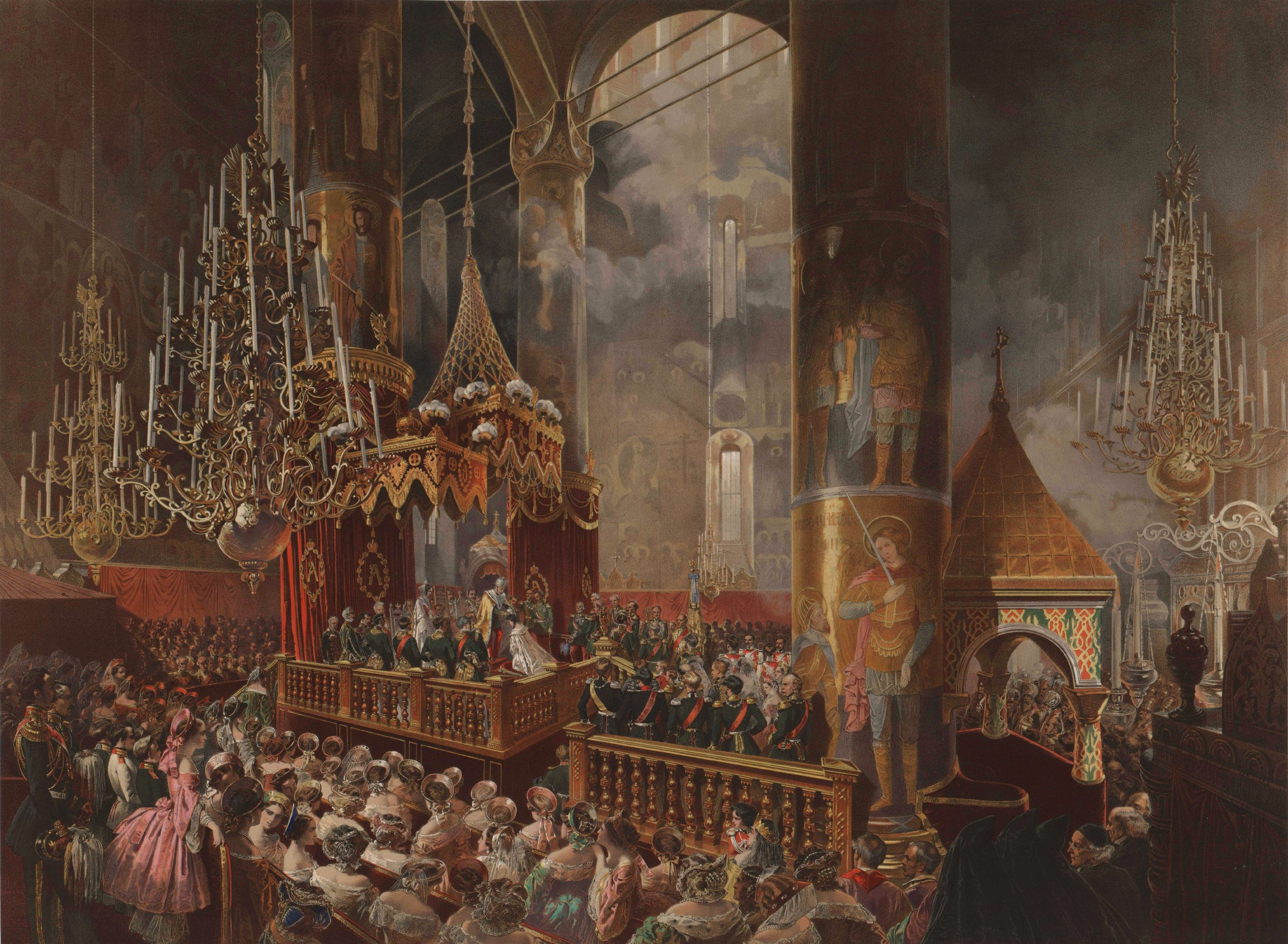
Mihály Zichy - Coronation of Alexander II (1857, Hermitage)

Events from the year 1856 in Russia

== Incumbents ==
- Monarch – Alexander II

== Events ==
- Tretyakov Gallery
- Baltic Shipyard
- The Appearance of Christ Before the People
- Low Marks Again
- Russia lost The Russo Crimean War (1853-1856) due to an Alliance of France, and The Ottoman Empire
- Treaty of Paris

== Births ==
- February 2nd Makar Ekmaylan, Vagharshapat, (modern day Armenia) Erivan Governorate, Russian Empire; Died 1905
- May 2nd Vasily Vasilyevich Rozanov; Died 1919
