= Artyomov =

Artyomov or Artemov (Russian: Артёмов) and Artyomova or Artemova (Russian: Артёмова; feminine) is a common Russian surname.

It may refer to the following people:

== People ==
- Aleksei Artyomov (b. 1983), Russian football player
- Nikolay Artemov (1908–2005), Russian physiologist
- Sergey Artyomov (b. 1978), Russian professional footballer
- Sergei N. Artemov (b. 1951), Russian and American mathematician
- Vladimir Artemov (b. 1964), Russian gymnast
- Vyacheslav Artyomov, (b. 1940), Russian and Soviet composer
- Natalya Artyomova (b. 1963), Russian middle-distance runner

== Places ==
- Artyomov (village), a village (khutor) in Rostov Oblast, Russia
