= Gordiy Sablukov =

Gordiy Semionovich Sablukov (1804–1880) was a Russian expert on Islam.

With Dimitriy Boguslavsky he was responsible for the first Russian translation of the Koran from Arabic into Russian.

== Bibliography ==
- Geraci, Robert.; Khodarkovsky, Michael (2001). Of religion and empire: missions, conversion, and tolerance in Tsarist Russia. ISBN 9780801434228.
- Geraci, Robert (2001). Window on the East: national and imperial identities in late tsarist Russia. ISBN 9780801434228.
- Petrosyan, Yu (1996). Koran review [1997]. Vol. 2 (3 ed.).
- Nanji, Azim (1997). Mapping Islamic studies: genealogy, continuity, and change. ISBN 9783110141870.
