= Leningrad Zoo =

Zoo in Russia

Coordinates: 59.95249°N 30.30868°E

- Interactive map of Leningrad Zoo
- Date opened: 1865
- Location: Saint Petersburg, Russia
- No. of animals: 2000
- No. of species: 410
- Website: http://www.spbzoo.ru

The Leningrad Zoo (Russian: Ленингра́дский зоопа́рк), sometimes called the Saint Petersburg Zoo or Sankt-Peterburgskiy Zoopark (Russian: Санкт-Петербу́ргский зоопа́рк), in Saint Petersburg (formerly Leningrad), Russia, is located in Alexander Park in the Petrogradskaya Storona. It was founded by Sofia Gerhardt and Julius Gerhardt in 1865. It has about 2,000 animals from 410 species, including polar bears. It is one of the oldest zoos in Russia, as well as the most northernly.

The zoo was renamed from "Zoological Garden" to "Leningrad Zoo" in 1952. In 1991 the name was retained, even after the city resumed its former name of Saint Petersburg, in commemoration of the zoo workers' deed of saving the animals during the Leningrad Blockade.

== History ==
Saint Petersburg Zoological gardens, today called Leningrad Zoo, was one of the first zoos in Russia, and was opened in Alexander Park.

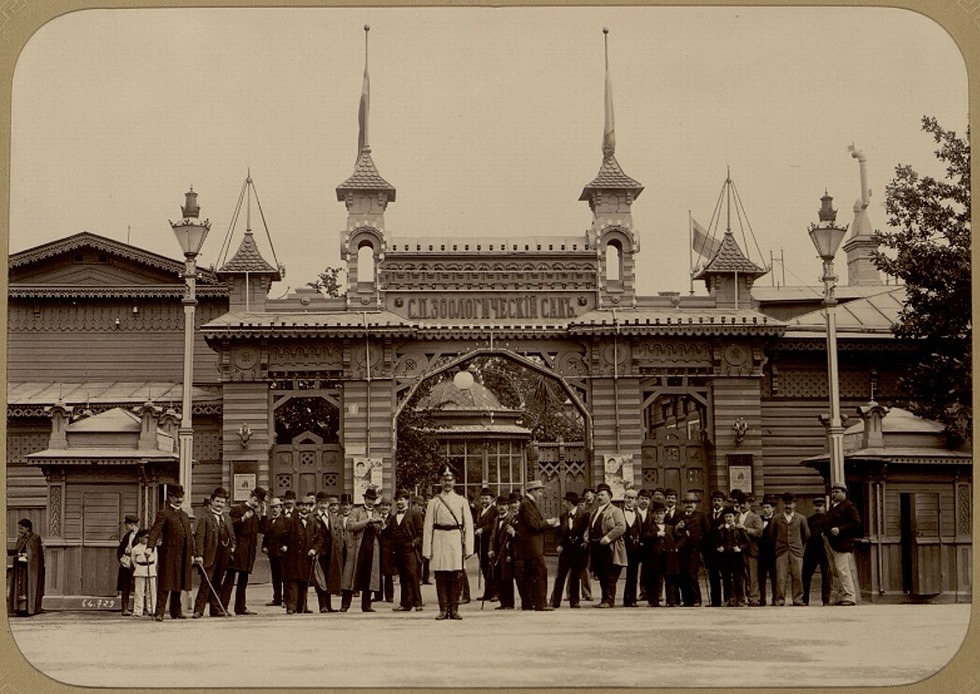
The new entrance to the zoo, built by the architect N. D Strukov after 1910

The first owners of Saint Petersburg zoo were Sofia and Julius Gebhardt. The zoological gardens fell into decline and closed in 1909. In 1910, S. H. Novinkov became the new owner of the zoo.

The zoo was nationalised in 1918.

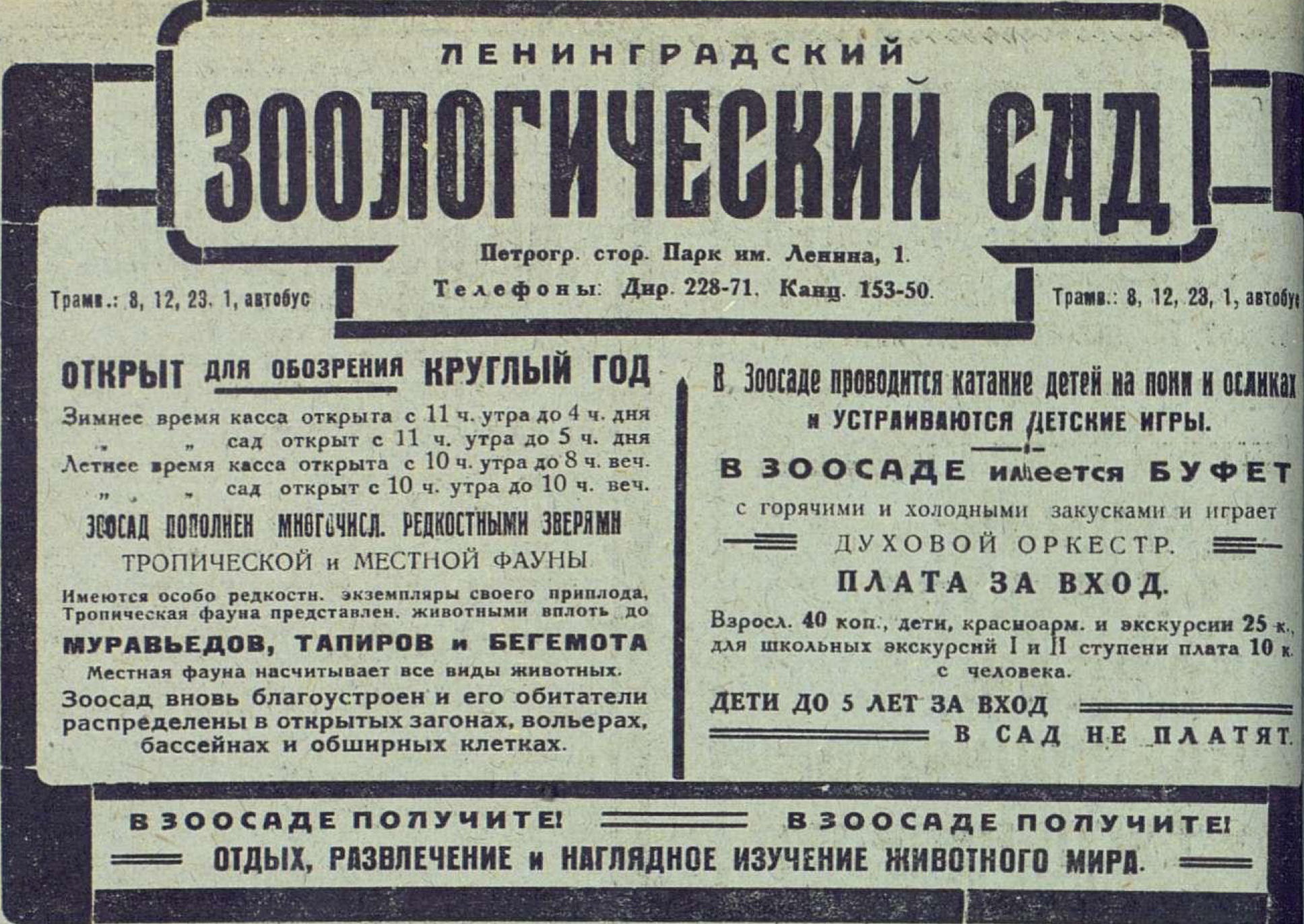
Advertisement for the Zoological Gardens, 1930.

World War II started. The zoo suffered greatly during the war, but did not stop its work even during the most difficult times of the Leningrad Blockade. The workers were able to save part of the collection of animals. In memory of the heroic actions of the workers who saved the zoo during the Leningrad Blockade, the zoo, disregarding the city's renaming to Saint Petersburg, remained named as Leningrad Zoo.

The zoo was opened permanently in the spring of 1944, and since development in the new area was not possible, restoration work began on the old site. The most intensive construction was carried out in 1951.

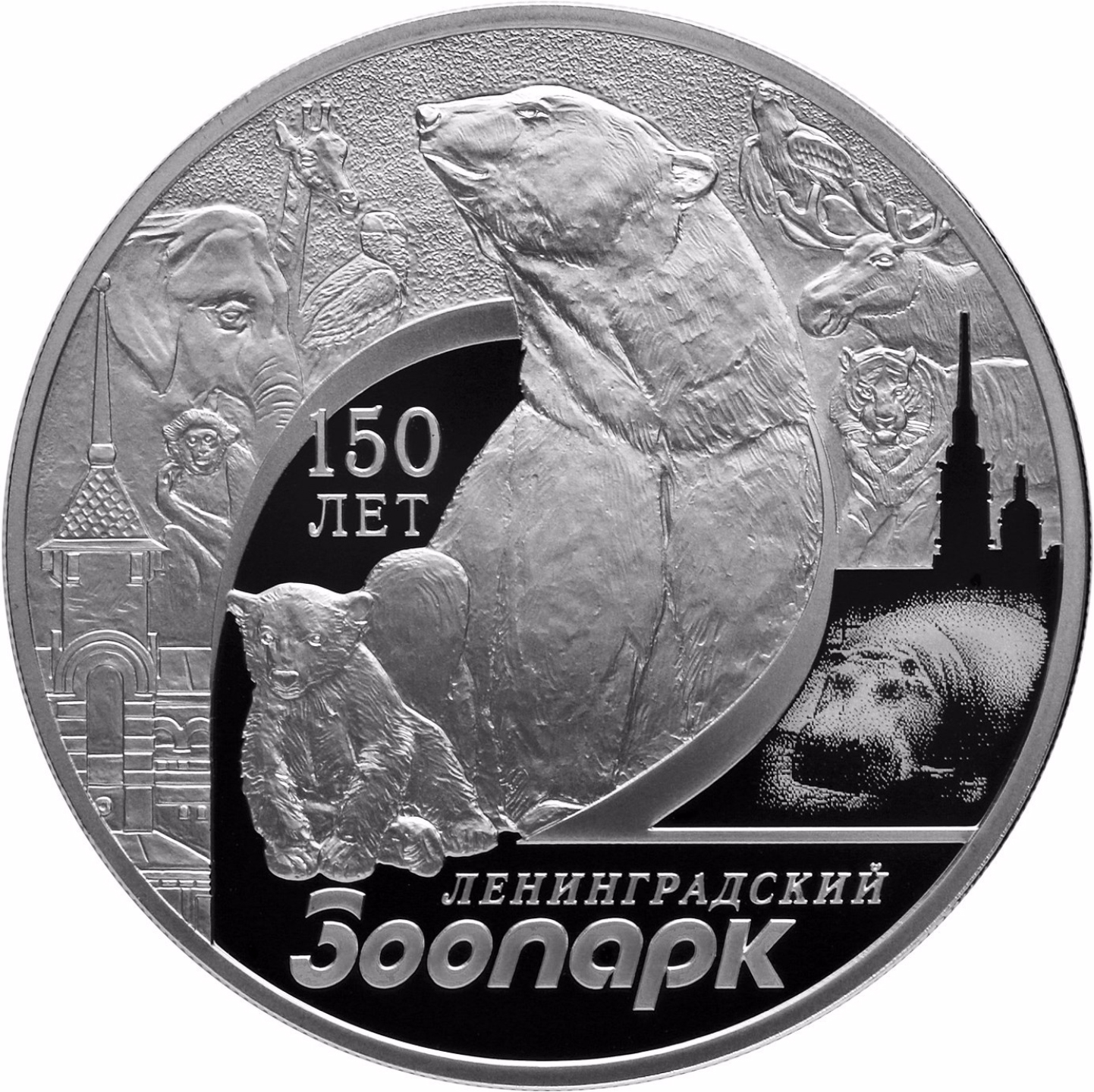
Commemorative coin for the zoo's 150 year anniversary.

At this time, the majority of buildings and facilities were in unsatisfactory condition. Therefore, the decision was made to carry out complete renovation work, which started in 1967. Since the renovation was planned to last 3 to 5 years, the plan was to construct new buildings on site of the old ones. The fact that the work took such a long time was one of the main reasons for the decline of such an excellent collection of animals, and the majority of difficulties in the further acquisition of animals. The zoo lost both its elephant and hippo enclosures. The hippopotamuses were moved to Kiev, the rhinoceros was moved to Belarus, and the African elephant to Tashkent. By 1988 only 8 buildings had been built as part of the renovations. In 1996, construction of a Terrarium begun, but this was stopped due to lack of funding. This building was only opened for visitors in 2007, renamed as ‘Exotarium’, which houses fish, snakes, lizards, turtles, crocodiles and other animals. In 2005 the government developed a strategy to develop Leningrad Zoo at its historical site, where it is currently located.

== Animal Exhibits ==
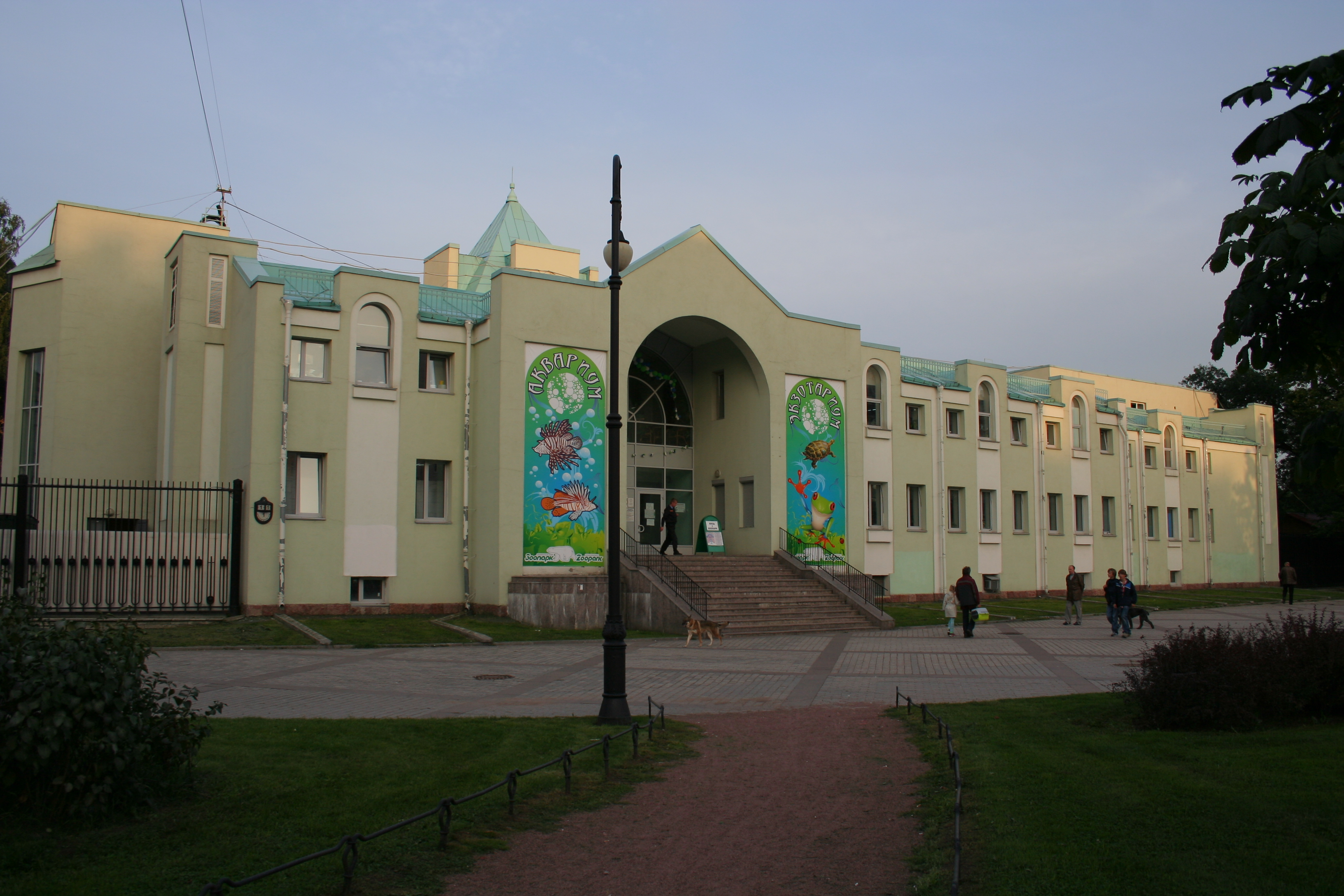
View of the entrance to the Exotarium

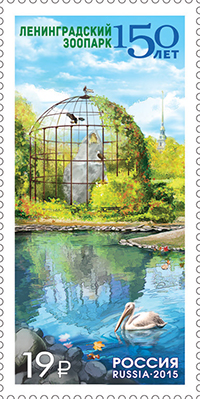
Commemorative stamp for the zoo's 150 year anniversary

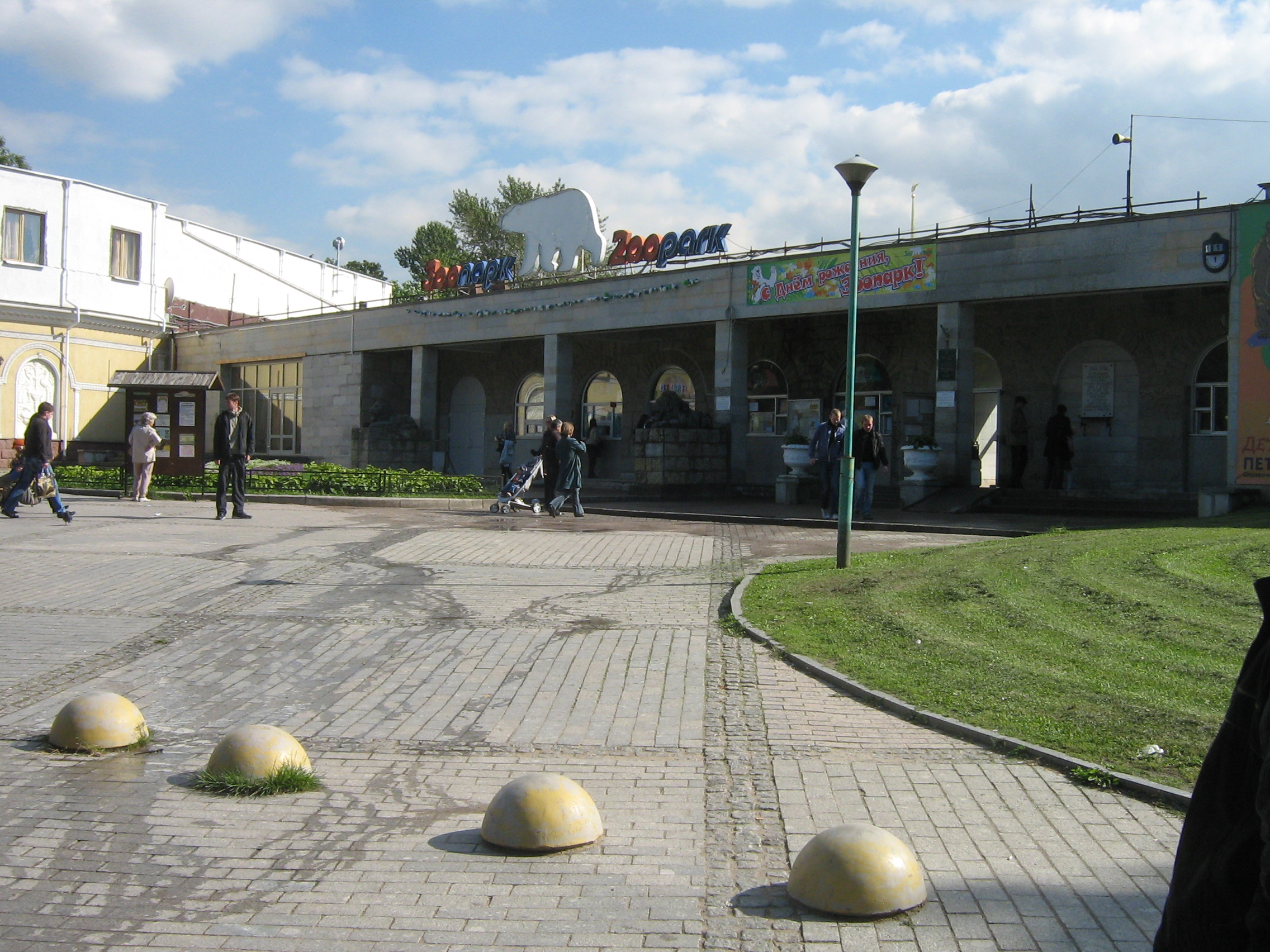
The main entrance to the zoo.

The zoo's current collection of animals consists of around 600 types of animals. Priority has been given to the smaller species which don't require a lot of space, as the zoo has limited area.

- Predator's House is home to big cats such as jaguars, African lions, pumas and snow leopards. Inside the exhibit, there are open air winter cages for the lions and jaguars.
- Primate's House houses a variety of primates, and includes lemurs, armadillos, and a few other that live in warm environments.
- Exotarium covers two floors. The aquarium is located on the first floor, and is home to different types of coral, marine and freshwater fish and other aquatic life. The second floor houses reptiles and amphibians and insects, as well as a winter enclosure for birds, and other small predators.
- Small Predator's House is open year round. This exhibit houses wolverines, martens, Pallas's cats, and other small predators.
- European Forest Exhibit houses typical animals of the European forest, such as squirrels, hares, lynx, and beavers.
- Tropical House houses porcupines, peccaries, parrots, squirrel monkeys and other species that require a warm environment.
- Deer Circle has reindeer, Pere David's deer and elk.
- Kangaroo and Emu Enclosure is a complex of enclosures, which house Bennett's tree-kangaroos and emus.
- Educational Animals House is where the animals used in the zoo's lectures and educational programmes are housed, including lynx, steppe marmot, owls, foxes, amongst others.
- Children's Zoo has domestic animals such as different breeds of chickens, geese, cows, rabbits, and turkeys.
- House of Birds houses owls (hawk owl, Arctic owl, long-tailed and great grey owl and the eagle owl) as well as magpies, crows, peregrine falcon, western capercaillie, kestrel and other animals.
- Birds of Prey Enclosure has a variety of different species, such as the white-tailed eagle, Steller's sea eagle, black vulture, raven, tawny eagle, saker falcon, and Andean condor.
- Bird Pond is a large, round pond, which houses greylag and bar-headed geese, Canadian and barnacle geese, and whooper swans.
- Camel Enclosure houses Bactrian camels, llamas and alpacas.
