= Sofia Gerhardt =

Founder of the Leningrad Zoo

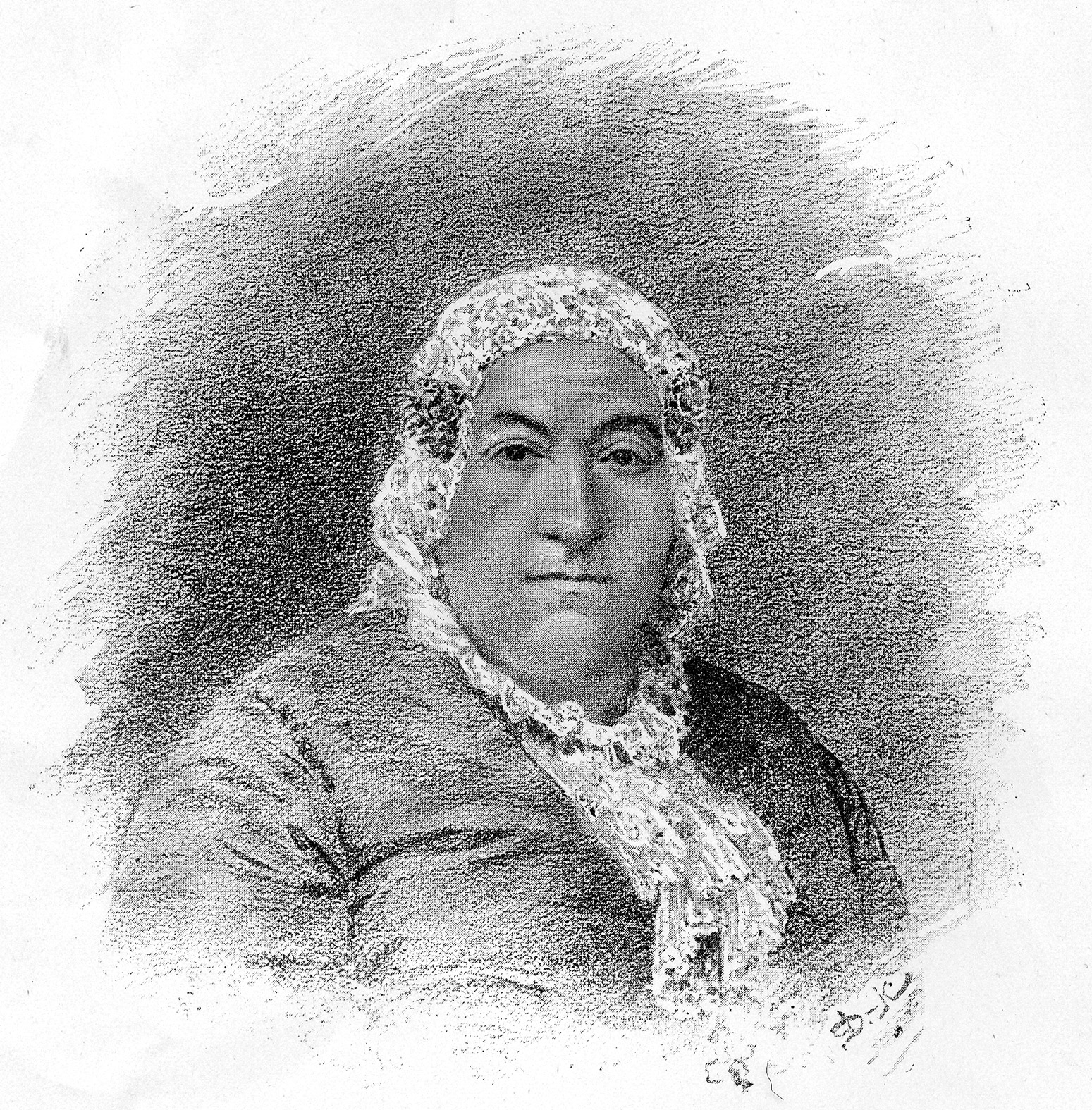
Gerhardt, c. 1887

Sofia Gerhardt (1813-1887), was a Russian businessperson.

She was the founder of the Leningrad Zoo.
