= Aleksei Artyomov =

Russian professional football player

Personal information
- Full name: Aleksei Vyacheslavovich Artyomov
- Date of birth: 17 February 1983 (age 43)
- Place of birth: Saransk, Russian SFSR
- Height: 1.89 m (6 ft 2 in)
- Positions: Midfielder; forward

Senior career*
Years	Team	Apps	(Gls)
2001	FC Svetotekhnika Saransk	7	(0)
2002	FC Biokhimik-Mordovia Saransk	6	(0)
2002	FC Elektronika Nizhny Novgorod	7	(1)
2004	FC Torpedo Volzhsky	19	(1)
2005	FC Alnas Almetyevsk	26	(0)
2006–2007	FC Mordovia Saransk	38	(0)
2008	FC Tekstilshchik Ivanovo	31	(4)
2009	FC Sheksna Cherepovets	26	(0)
2010	FC Dynamo Kostroma	14	(2)
- * Club domestic league appearances and goals

Aleksei Vyacheslavovich Artyomov (Russian: Алексей Вячеславович Артёмов; born 17 February 1983) is a former Russia professional football player.

== Club career ==
Artyomov played in the Russian Football National League with FC Mordovia Saransk in 2007.
