= Berdychiv machine-building plant =

Ukrainian industrial equipment manufacturer

JSC Berdichev Machine-Building Plant "Progress"
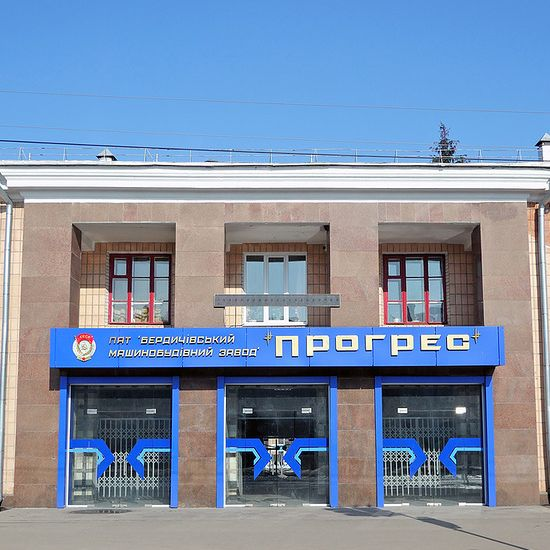
- PJSC "Berdychiv Machine-Building Plant "Progress"
- Type: Joint-stock company
- Industry: Machine-building
- Founded: 1880
- Headquarters: Berdichev, Ukraine
- Key people: Vladimir Makarkin, Chairman of the Supervisory Board Igor Schesnyak, Chairman of the Board; Alexander Chumel, Chief Engineer; Gennadiy Losovskiy, Deputy Chairman of the Board for Commerce; Evgueniy Kalinowskiy, Deputy Chairman of the Board for Manufacturing; Viktor Lopatkin, Director of the Quality Management Center; Viktor Vorotyntcev, Head of the Contracts and Shipment Department Anatoliy Borisov, Head of the Product Sales Department
- Products: Products of general and mean machine-building

Berdychiv Machine-Building Plant (also known as the Progress Plant) is a machine building company in the town of Berdychiv, in Zhytomyr Oblast, Ukraine (not to be confused with "Berdychiv machine-building plant "Progress" Ltd. located in Kyiv).

== History ==
=== Establishment and early operation ===
The Berdychiv Machine-Building Plant was originally a mechanical and ironworks plant owned by L. Plakhetskyi and founded in 1880 on Market square in close proximity to Berdychiv train station. Production shops and sections were placed on the total area of 3,730 square meters fathoms. The plant was equipped with a cupola, four blacksmiths' forges, seven machines and a steam engine with 8 hp. The number of workers amounted to 30 people, the annual production – up to 50 thousand rubles.

In the first years of its existence, the plant was only repairing farm implements, and later began producing plows, seeders, winnowings and other agricultural equipment.

Soon Plahetskiy invites merchant I. Doberskiy for collaboration as companions, and the company begins to operate under the name «Plahetskiy and Doberskiy mechanical and iron foundry».

Further development of the plant was due to the strong construction in the South-West of Russia the sugar and distilleries enterprises, mills, peelings and creameries. Founders of constructing enterprises are starting to fill up the plant with orders of Plahetskiy and Doberskiy.

To a large extent, the development of the plant was due to the proximity of the railway, which linked Berdychiv with Kozyatyn in 1870, then with Shepetivka, and in 1896 – with the center of Volyn province – Zhytomyr.

The scale of the plant's production of Plahetskiy and Doberskiy steadily expanded, and in 1892 his equipment has already been presented two locomobile, carrying a total capacity of 16 hp, two cupolas, six forges, 17 different machines and two mechanical fans.

=== Granting of charter ===
The abundance of incoming orders and limited production power require fundamental restructuring of the plant. Plahetskiy and Doberskiy widen the territory of the plant at the expense of additional purchases from landowners of the areas adjacent to the company. In 1895 as a companion they invited engineer N. Barsukov.

In September 1895, Plahetskiy, Doberskiy and Barsukov sent to the Department of Trade and Manufactures of the Ministry of Trade and Industry of the Russian Empire a petition for approval of the draft statute of the Association of Machine-Building Plant Progress.

June 29, 1896, Russian emperor Nicolay II approved the charter, and based on that created the Society of Machine-Building Plant «Progress» with the main capital of 350 thousand rubles. Holding of shares has been issued in an amount of 1,400 pieces of dignity 350 rubles each.

In 1896 the plant significantly expands its production capacity by constructing new buildings, building a machine shop with a gallery area of 864 square meters, forges, ironworks with dryers and cupolas, the model and copper departments etc. In 1900 entered service machine shop, and in 1903 was made a full shift on a production of equipment for sugar and refinery factories.

=== 20th century industrial action ===
At the beginning of 20th century to replace the former owners of the plant comes a new, mostly foreigners. Managing Director of Swiss society becomes F.G. Enny. G. Enny and P. Gomola were elected as a government. Subsequently, almost all the main capital of the company passed into the hands of Swiss man Enny.

In the factory manual labor prevailed. Transport of materials, intermediates and components are carried out either manually or using carts. The working day is 11–12 hours. For heavy work skilled workers receive a day 1 rub. 25 kopecks, laborers – 80 kopecks, and trainees – 30-40 kopecks. Low wages was cut by the host's masters of various fines.

In the shops there was no ventilation, because of what had to work in clouds of fumes, dust and asphyxiating gases. Shareholders do not take any measures to improve working conditions for workers, increasing their profits by intensifying their exploitation.

Single workers’ protests against the arbitrary administration had no success. In addition, these protests could turn into a desktop real danger of being thrown out of the gate of the plant, where was a crowd of impoverished city dwellers trying to find any work and landless peasants from surrounding villages.

Erupted in the years 1900-1903 global economic crisis, seized also the tsarist Russia, an extremely negative impact on an already miserable situation of workers of the plant. Wages sharply reduced. The administration continuously laying off workers, leaving their families destitute.

13 August 1903, after the lunch break the factory workers stopped work, and entering into negotiations with the administration, put forward the following demands: to set an 8-hour working day, increase hourly labor costs and replace piece paid daily wage, increase efficiency wages in the foundry, to stop decline wages by reducing the working day.

Managing the plant promised workers to bring their claims to management board located in Kiev, managed to convince them to get to work. However, the board did not agree with the requirements of the workers. Learning of this, the workers went on strike again on August 16, insisting on meeting their requirements. They were supported by workers of Burko's tannery, shoe factory of Levkovskiy, furniture factories «Wojciech-Vienna» and Mezhirichera. The strike was attended by about 1500 workers of different enterprises in the city.

Authorities to suppress the strike brought the troops, and only at gunpoint on August 17 resumed work. The administration promised to plant in a timely manner to inform workers about the fix rates for piecework.

July 20, 1904, workers at the plant organized to stop work and strike. They demanded from the administration higher wages and shorter working day. Shareholders do not agree to meet workers' demands, threatening to close the plant, but workers did not retreat from their demands. The strike lasted until 1 August.

Under pressure from the strikers administration was forced to make some concessions. Working day from 11,5 hours down to 11. The plant was not closed.

On March 11, 1905, workers of a lathe department, having thrown a bag over master Bychkovskiy's head because he gained favour with the proprietor, threw him in a car and, shouting «Hurrah!», took him out of the gates of the plant. The administration announced the dismissal of the 10 organizers of this event.

Plant workers demanded the restoration of sacked by threatening to plant administration with cessation of work and the mass strike. The administration was forced to comply with this demand and recover dropouts.

Major strike that gripped the entire plant, held on June 29, 1905. In the morning the workers quit work and gathered in the square adjacent to the refinery, the meeting took place. The strikers sent to the Directorate the following requirements: an 8-hour workday, higher wages by 30%, elimination of overtime work, provision of workers’ health care and the same for their families, establishment of day wages from the calculation: laborer – at least 1 rub., trainees after two years of training - not less than 50 kopecks.

Director of the plant has agreed to introduce 10-hour working day with pay for 11 hours, pay laborers left unchanged, that is 70-80 kopecks, trainees after two years of education promised to pay 50 kopecks. Have also been promised cancellation of overtime job and improve medical care.

Response of Directorate has not satisfied the strikers, and they demanded full compliance.

The next morning, the workers, not renewing the work headed with an organized column to the Kornilov Sugar Factory and suggested its workers support the strike. They accepted the offer.

1 July strikers gathered again at the factory gate, insisting on the implementation of their demands by Directorate, and only after received assurances that the majority of them will be satisfied, began to work.

As a result of the strike, workers have achieved the following concessions from management: time on ordinary days was reduced to 10 hours and on Saturdays - to 9 with pay; at the plant was introduced paramedic position and ensured the reception of patients by a doctor twice a week; was promised a revision of rates for piecework; for three days of the strike the workers were paid wages.

December 12, 1905 ceased to operate many factories and commercial establishments. The next day, their support for factory workers of «Progress» and the Kornilov sugar beet, which are in solidarity with their comrades in the struggle, too, is not got to work. December 14 idled almost all factories and commercial establishments of the city.

Factory workers’ speeches have caused significant impact on returns to shareholders. The basic capital of the company fell from 350 thousand rubles to 280 thousand rubles, the share prices has fallen from 250 rubles to 200 rubles. Shareholders looking for a way out of the impasse, have sought to strengthen the ailing economy partnership. By that time, the vast majority of the shares taken over by Swiss man Enny. In 1910 at the meeting of shareholders a decision on a petition to the Ministry of Trade and Industry to increase the share capital of 170 thousand rubles and the additional issue of shares for this amount of 200 rubles each was taken.

This petition found support of the ministry, allowing the shareholders failed to correct shaky economic situation, realized the transition to production of equipment for sugar refinery: tanks, evaporators and vacuum machines, fermentation tanks and equipment for breweries and distilleries, Pasburg's vehicles, trolleys, capacitors, gutters, washing beet, railway careers, beet and press augers, dryers, elevators, lifts, various building steel (trusses, columns, stairs, fences, etc.).

Machinery equipment consisted of the 44 lathes, 11 planers, 4 chiselings, 24 drilling machines and others. For the manufacture of rivets there were three driving hammers. Two cupolas worked in the foundry.

Energy sector was represented by gas-producing motors with a total capacity of about 120 hp, with the help of which metal-working equipment was activated. Electrical lighting provided by a dynamo, operated by a gas engine, carrying capacity 30 hp.

In 1900–1912, years the plant was involved in the construction and equipping of the sugar mills in Ashehe (Manchuria), Garbovskiy, Kiselevskiy, Koryukovskiy, Mezenovskiy, Odesskiy, Suprunovskiy, Fedorovskiy, Cherkasskiy and Shepetovskiy, fully equipped Yaroshevskiy, Yanushpolskiy, Nabutovskiy, Penskiy and Ryzhavskiy sugar mills, as well as Belokolodezskiy and Kashperovskiy refineries. More than 120 sugar enterprises were clients of production of the plant.

In the shops there was no ventilation and heating, factory buildings fell into decay.

Factory Fintes Director turned in 1913 to Berdychiv county district council with a request to reduce the amount of taxes due to the dilapidation of buildings and equipment wear, described the plant at the time: «The derived value of machinery and machine tools 85,121 rubles and buildings amounting to 32,822 rubles is even higher than the current value thereof, except housing and mechanical parts of the foundry, instead resumed collapsed: the rest are only a wooden sheds, which cannot be named buildings».

In 1913, were manufactured industrial products worth 1,477,266 rubles.

=== First World War ===
Since the beginning in July 1914 the First World War the plant received a large military orders from the Petrograd District Ordnance Department, Mikhaylovskiy (Shostenskiy) gunpowder factory, Samarskiy (Sergievskiy) plant explosives, the society of the Moscow-Kiev-Voronezh railway etc. Only Petrograd District Ordnance Department placed an order for 300 thousand three-inch high-explosive grenades.

To perform military orders required a radical restructuring of production. In 1914-1915 are commissioned slug and boiler shops. To handle shells grenades set metalworking equipment in the amount of 400 thousand rubles. In 1915 a newly built electric power stations were built and energy base is replenished by Nobel diesel 160 hp and Felzer diesel 70 hp, as well as Electric generatorgenerators with total capacity of 95 kW. A year later, in 1916, to expedite the shipment of military orders to the plant railway line was lay.

=== Modern days ===
In 1996 - after 100 years - a second place incorporation of the plant took place. In 2000 established LLC «Trading House Plant «Progress».

=== Today ===
The company has implemented and operates a certified quality management system in accordance with ISO 9001:2015.

In 2007, year factory finished with a net profit of ₴4.165 million, increased net income by 67.42% or ₴40.232 million to ₴99.906 million compared with 2006.

In 2008, BMZ «Progress» increased the net revenue from product sales by 21% compared with 2007 - up to ₴120.78 million, net profit increased by 18% - to ₴4.91 million.

Plant completed 2009 with a net profit of ₴0.262 million that in 18.7 times less than the similar characteristics in 2008 (₴4.91 million).

As at 11 December 2008, 13.02% stake in the plant belongs to the company «Trading house works «Progress» (Kyiv), 61.14% - Company «Ukrtehuglerod» (Kyiv) and 9.58% - Holding Company «AvtoKrAZ».

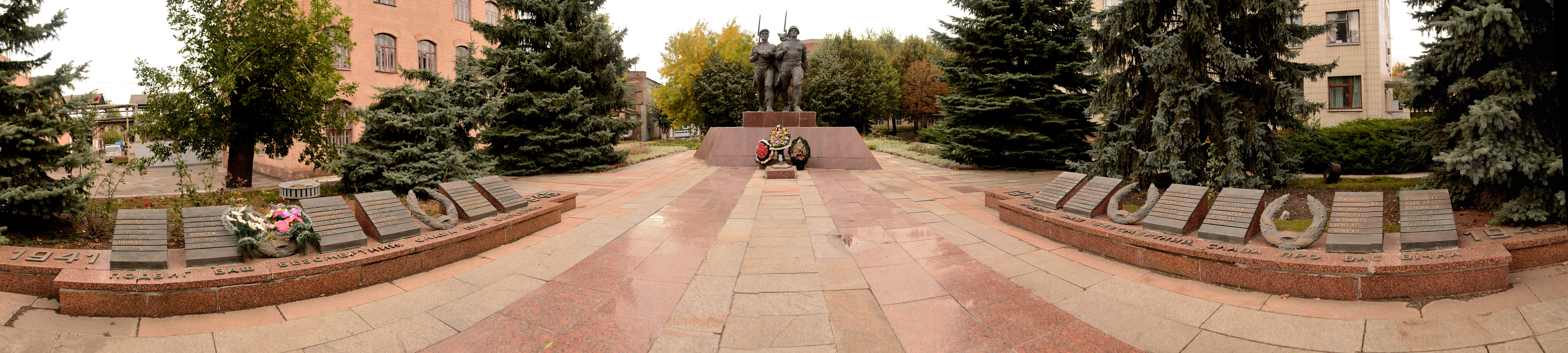
Monument to the workers of the plant "Progress" dying during the Second World War

Plant supplies equipment to many enterprises of Ukraine and other CIS countries, as well as in the US, Germany, Israel, China, Iran, India, Eastern Europe, Turkey.

On the territory of OJSC «Berdychiv Machine-Building Plant «Progress» and the city of Berdychiv in the fall of 2008 were recorded footage of the film «In Paris!» (the working title «Dad», the company «Pyramid», directed by Sergey Krutin, starring - Yuriy Stepanov, Polina Kutepova, Jaroslav Zhalnin, Georgiy Drozd, Valeriya Hodos, Eugeniy Efremov), which was released in cinemas in 2009.

== Important Events ==
=== BMZ «Progress» anniversary ===
In the days from 23 to 25 September 2010, celebrating of the Berdychiv Machine-Building Plant «Progress» 130 anniversary was held, timed to Day of Mechanical Engineering. The event was held on the square before the Palace of Culture, having collected a huge amount of «Progress» workers and Berdychiv residents who enjoyed blowing in the wind energy of Berdychiv engineering. Besides the concert, the citizens had the opportunity to watch sporting baton, in which the team of the Plant Casting Complex won a victory. After the event all went to the Palace of Culture to watch the video «Progress», captured by the movie company «Vick» to order management engineering enterprise.

=== Production of the biggest filter ===
30 August 2009, the company unveiled its newly developed filter-press KMPm-196. As a result, the plant had received a diploma and a prize winner of Ukrainian quality competition «100 best goods of Ukraine» at the regional level. This again proved the correctness of policies and strategies of top management and LLC «Trade House Plant «Progress», which aims to meet the needs and expectations of customers through the design of new structures and technologies and providing competitive advantages in the markets of different countries. October 22, 2010 filter-press KMPm-196 was successfully put into operation. Today it is the most advanced equipment of this type in the world.

=== OJSC "BMZ" Progress " reorganized into the public joint-stock company ===
On April 10, 2012, according to the results of the regular meeting of shareholders OJSC Berdychiv machine-building plant "Progress" is reorganized into the Public Joint-Stock Company.

=== PJSC "BMZ" Progress " reorganized into the joint-stock company ===
On April 15, 2019, according to the results of the regular meeting of shareholders PJSC Berdychiv machine-building plant "Progress" is reorganized into the Joint-Stock Company.

== Main activities ==
Production filtration and storage equipment, apparatus with rotating drums, valves, molds and transfer mold for rubber and plastic, components of the pressure receptacles, perforated metal sheets, production forgings, cast iron, nonferrous and high-alloy steel castings for companies coal, mining, petroleum, chemical, petrochemical, chemical, pharmaceutical, metallurgical, construction, engineering, light and food industries, enterprises energy and utilities, consumer goods for the population as well as manufacturing parts and components for documentation or samples of customers.

== Products ==
- Filters for separating suspensions into solid and liquid phase (capacitor, disc, tape, sheet, cartridge)
- Filters for dust-laden air (electrostatic precipitators, bag filters and metal -histic)
- Filter Presses (chamber (tower and horizontal), frame, belt)
- Salt dissolvent, tape mixers, apparatuses with mixing devices, destructors
- Apparatus with rotary drums (dryers, ovens, refrigerators, molds, coagulators)
- Shut-off valves (gate bolts, pinch valves)
- Moulds and transfer molds for rubbers and plastics
- Elements of pressure vessels (bottoms, flanges, fittings)
- Perforated metal sheets
- Forgings
- Cast iron, nonferrous and high-alloy steel castings
- Consumer Goods
- Household and industrial boilers
- Industrial hardware
- The parts of the documentation or samples of customers
