= The Russian Tax Debate of 1870–1871 =

The Russian Tax Debate of 1870–1871 was a debate between the Russian central government and the Zemstva about replacing the newest soul tax policy with an income tax.

== Soul tax ==
In 1725, a tax policy was created by Czar Peter the Great called the "soul tax". Land was awarded based on the number of factors or "economic units" a household had: this could include a 'tyaglo' (man and wife pair), 'soul' (adult male), 'worker' (adult male or female), or 'eater' (household member of any age). Before 1861, the tyaglo tended to be only on private estates and the 'soul' on state land. The idea continued to grow after the serfs were freed from the land, but an adult male counted for two souls. These ideas were very similar, and a Russian male mainly looked for a partner that could not only work in the fields, but help the household with fiscal obligations as well.

The "soul tax" applied to alcohol and salt, and also included a head tax on Russian men. This created an issue because most of the consumers of salt and alcohol were among the peasantry. Therefore, petty merchants were directly affected by both forms of the tax, whereas the higher classes in the Russian economic ladder were untouched by the indirect tax and only had to worry about the head tax.

In 1725, half of state revenues came from the soul tax, although a century later that number dropped to 30 percent. By 1856, the alcohol taxes outweighed the direct tax, by 36 percent to 20 percent of revenues.

Due to a financial crisis in the 1870s, peasants were forced to pay higher taxes. Clergy and nobles were also taxed in order to close the deficit, leading the government to reform their policies.

On May 26, 1870, the Committee of Ministers recommended printing the commission's proposal and distributing it to the local governors, who would then show it to their respective zemstva (local governments instituted during the great liberal reforms by Alexander II of Russia) for consideration.

On June 10 of that year, Alexander II confirmed this recommendation; two days later a proposal was sent to the governors along with a circular from the Minister of Finance.

During the preceding three years, peasants had paid an average of 286,000 rubles in state taxes for local needs versus 440,000 rubles for the new approach, more than a 50 percent increase.

== Zemstvo Congress of 1871 ==
Various proposals circulated in the zemstvo committees, trying to frame appropriate responses to the central government's taxation plan.

- The Tambov commission favored property taxes on land and homes plus a per capita assessment on adult workers.
- Committees in other provinces gravitated toward a graduated income tax to be levied on the entire population, while still other committees tried to combine income taxes on the merchants and other targets on the peasants and nobility, so as to reduce the strain on peasant merchants that had existed under the old tax reforms.

== The imperial decision ==
The congress lasted three days, from March 15 to 17, 1871, and the government dropped its proposal to replace the soul tax with other assessments. Although it was not eliminated until 1887 under other economic circumstances, the idea of income tax gained favor in the central government.

== Sources ==
- Hamburg, G. M. (2009). "Taxes and Empire: The Russian Tax Debate of 1870–1871". Russian History. 36 (1): 16–46. doi:10.1163/187633109X412357.
