= Lydia Figner =

Russian revolutionary (1853–1920)

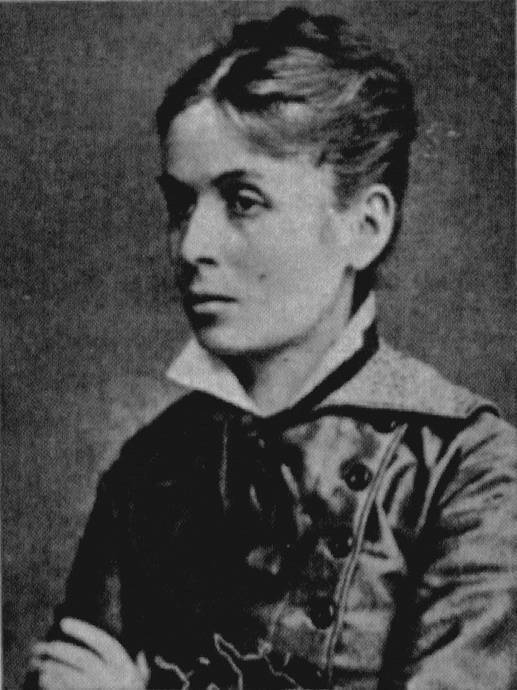
Lydia Figner

Lydia Nikolaevna Figner (1853–1920), was a Russian revolutionary and a prominent member of the Narodniks. She was the sister of Vera Figner.
