= Gregory Shuvalov =

Russian noble

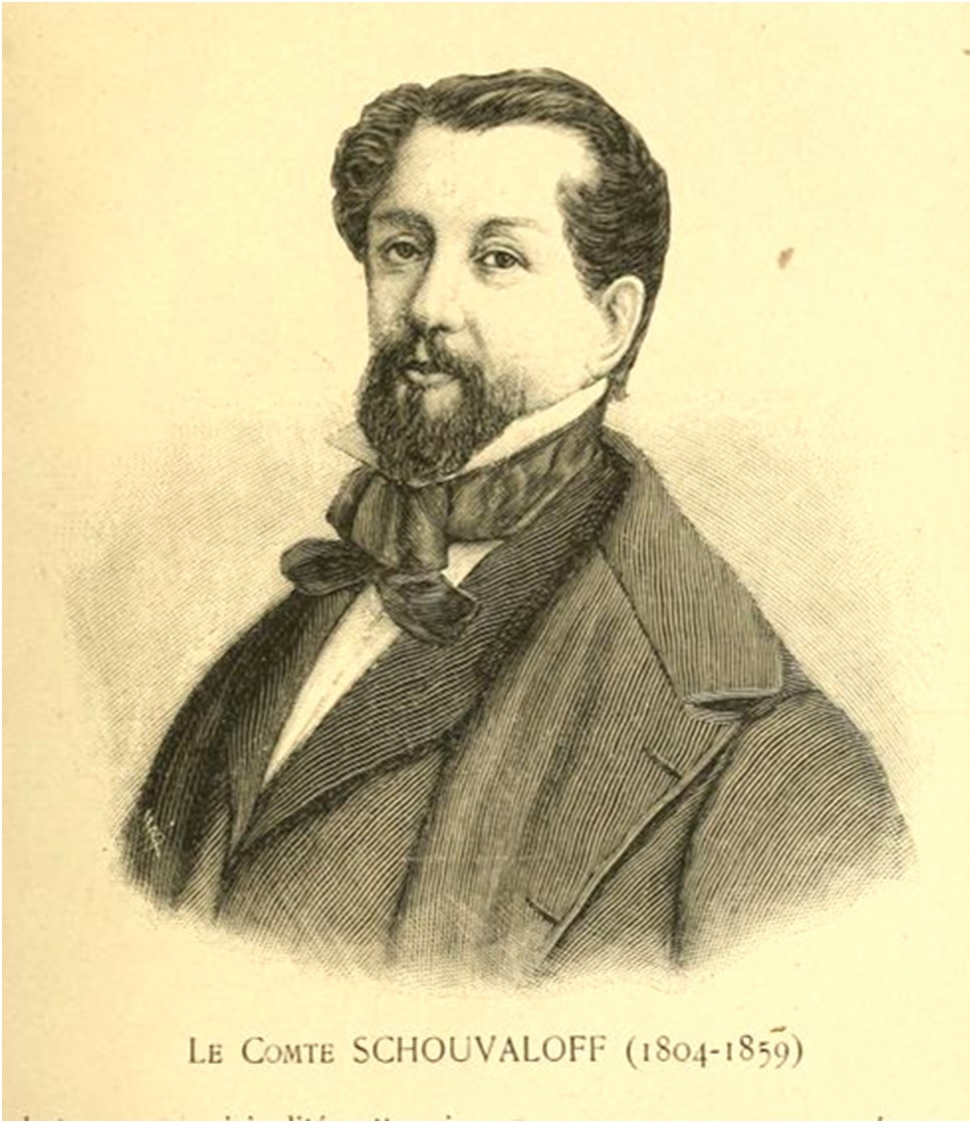
Gregory Shuvalov

Count Gregory Petrovich Shuvalov (1804–1859) was one of the Russian nobles of the second quarter of the 19th century, who converted from Russian Orthodoxy to Catholicism and emigrated to Catholic Europe.

== Biography ==
Gregory Shuvalov was the youngest son of Lieutenant-General Peter Shuvalov, a nephew of the governor-general of Moscow Alexey Shcherbatov. His initial education was in the Jesuit hostel in Saint Petersburg, since 1817 he studied in Switzerland and Italy. From 1823 to 1826, he served in the Hussars. Shortly after his marriage, he retired and, like the Saltykov princes, had gone with his family abroad. He lived in Italy, where he attended lectures by Giovanni La Cecilia, was engaged in literary work and wrote sonnets.

== Conversion to Roman Catholicism ==
The death of one of his sons and his wife's illness was a serious spiritual drama, and forced him to turn to God. In Paris, he was a frequent guest at Sophie Swetchine's salon, where he met Prince Ivan Gagarin. In 1843 Shuvalov converted to Catholicism and in the mid-1850s he was a novice in the Order of Barnabites and in 1856 in Milan he became a monk as Father Augustine Mary. Shuvalov died in a Catholic convent in 1859. He wrote an autobiography: "My Conversion and My Vocation". (London, Washbourne, 1877); originally published in French: "Ma conversion et ma vocation".

== Family ==
Since 1824, he was married to Princess Sophie Alexandrovna Saltykova (1806-1841), daughter of Alexander Saltykov. She made a lot of effort to return her husband to the Christian faith. Sophie wanted to accept Catholicism, but at the request of her husband postponed her decision. Due to her early death, she could not fulfill her desire; her husband was very sorry afterwards. Sophie Saltykova died of consumption. He had four sons:

Peter (1826-1882), member of the board of the Minister of Internal Affairs, was, like his father, a Catholic.

Grgorevich Alexander (1828-1829).

Elena (1830-1884), returned to the Orthodox Church and in her memoirs she spoke about the religious quests of her father; she married a collector of vintage music, Alexander Ya Skaryatin (1815-1884).

Natalia
