= Shchepkin =

Shchepkin or Schepkin (Russian: Щепкин, from щепка meaning small peace of wood, splinter) is a Russian masculine surname, its feminine counterpart is Shchepkina or Schepkina. It may refer to

- Mikhail Shchepkin (1788–1863), Russian actor
- Sergey Schepkin (born 1962), American pianist of Russian origin
- Tatiana Shchepkina-Kupernik (1874–1952), Russian writer, dramatist, poet and translator, granddaughter of Mikhail
