= Rēzekne I – Daugavpils Railway =

Railway line in Latvia

Rēzekne I–Daugavpils Railway
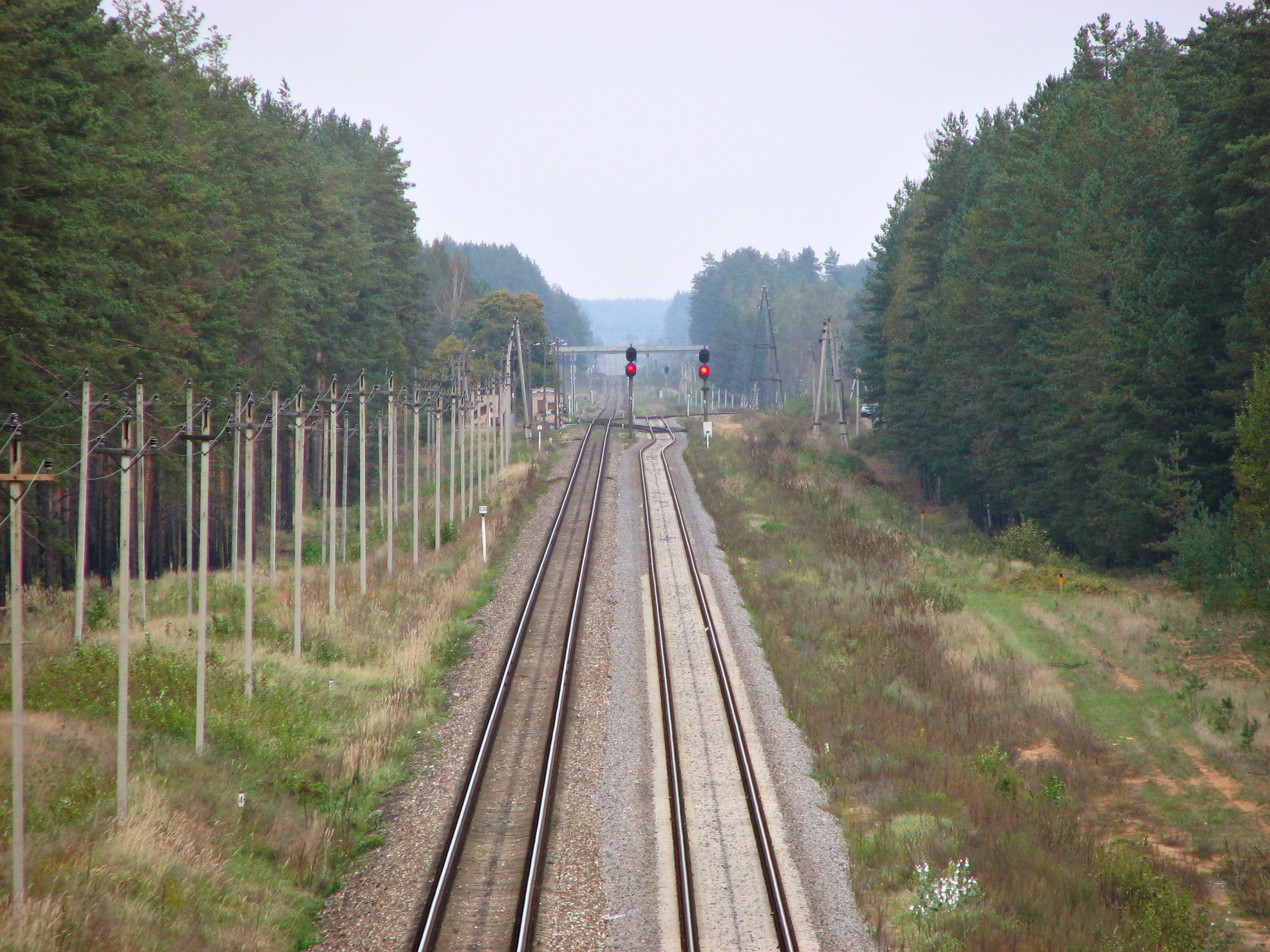

Overview
- Termini: Rēzekne I Station; Daugavpils Station

Service
- Operator(s): Latvian Railways

History
- Opened: 1860

Technical
- Line length: 84 km (52.20 mi)
- Track gauge: 1,524 mm (5 ft)
Route map
Railway lines in Latvia in 2016.

The Rēzekne I–Daugavpils Railway is an 84 kilometres (52 mi) long, 1,524 mm (5 ft) gauge railway line in southeastern Latvia. The railway connects the cities and railway hubs of Rēzekne and Daugavpils.

The railway line was built in the 19th century as part of the Saint Petersburg–Warsaw Railway.

Currently, the railway sees one passenger train per year, running only between Daugavpils and Aglona stations. The train was not run in 2020 and 2021 due to the COVID-19 pandemic.

== See also ==
- Rail transport in Latvia
- History of rail transport in Latvia

== Bibliography ==
- Altbergs, T.; Augustāne, K.; Pētersone, I. (2009). Dzelzceļi Latvijā [Railways in Latvia] (in Latvian). Jumava. ISBN 978-9984-38-698-0.
