= Mochalov =

Mochalov (masculine, Russian: Мочалов) or Mochalova (feminine, Russian: Мочалова) is a Russian surname. Notable people with the surname include:

- Eduard Mochalov (born 1974), Russian dissident and writer
- Evgeny Mochalov (born 1951), Belarusian chess master
- Pavel Mochalov (1800–1848), Russian actor
