= Grand Duke Alexander Alexandrovich of Russia =

Grand Duke of Russia

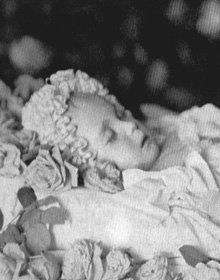
- Post-mortem photograph of Alexander on his bier, 1870
- Born: 7 June 1869; Saint Petersburg, Russia
- Died: 2 May 1870 (10 months 25 days); Saint Petersburg, Russia
- Burial: Saints Peter and Paul Cathedral, Saint Petersburg
Names
- Alexander Alexandrovich Romanov
- House: Holstein-Gottorp-Romanov
- Father: Alexander Alexandrovich, Tsesarevich of Russia (later Alexander III)
- Mother: Dagmar of Denmark

Grand Duke Alexander Alexandrovich of Russia (Russian: Александр Александрович; 7 June 1869 – 2 May 1870) was the second son of the Tsesarevich and Tsesarevna of Russia, later Emperor Alexander III and Empress Maria Feodorovna.

Grand Duke Alexander's father was heir apparent to the Russian throne as the eldest living son of Emperor Alexander II of Russia. The Grand Duke was Alexander and Maria's second child, second son, and the younger brother of the future Emperor Nicholas II.

Alexander died of bacterial meningitis in 1870, one month before his first birthday. Following his death, his mother Maria wrote to her own mother, Queen Louise of Denmark: "The doctors maintain he did not suffer, but we suffered terribly to see and hear him." The only photo taken of the Grand Duke was taken posthumously.

Sergey Sheremetev, the adjutant to Tsarevich Alexander, accompanied the body on horseback to the Peter and Paul Fortress. The grand duke was buried in the northern nave of the Peter and Paul Cathedral in a white marble sarcophagus.
