= 1849 in Russia =

In 1849, Tsar Nicholas I of Russia sent forces to intervene in the Hungarian Revolution, which was threatening to topple the Austro-Hapsburg leadership in Europe. Nicholas sent over 100,00 Russian troops into Hungary and Transylvania, forcing the surrender of the Hungarian Revolutionary Army.

1849 was also the year of the Petrashevsky Circle’s arrest as part of Nicholas’s attempts to suppress dissenters and liberal intellectuals. Fyodor Dostoevsky and other prisoners were subject to an infamous mock execution before being sent to Siberian labor camps.

== Incumbents ==
- Monarch – Nicholas I

== Events ==
- April 22 - arrest of the Petrashevsky Circle
- May 1 - Convention of Balta Liman agreement between Russia and the Ottoman Empire decides the political situation of the Danubian Principalities
- May 21 - Warsaw Agreement leads to Russian intervention in the Hungarian Revolution of 1848
- October 20 - resignation of Minister of Education Sergey Uvarov
- November 16 - Fyodor Dostoevsky (a member of the Petrashevsky Circle) was sentenced to death, a decision that was later reversed
- December 22 - a mock execution of the Petrashevsky Circle was staged, before the prisoners were sent to Siberian work camps
- Gennady Nevelskoy embarks on the Amur Expedition
- Grand Kremlin Palace completed
- Krasnoye Sormovo Factory No. 112 founded
- Nakhichevansky Uyezd established
- Ordubadsky Uyezd established
- Wissotzky Tea founded

== Births ==
- February 22 - Nikolay Yakovlevich Sonin, mathematician (d. 1915)
- June 29 - Sergei Witte, politician (d. 1915)
- September 26 - Ivan Pavlov, physiologist (d. 1936)
- October 3 - Vyacheslav Sreznevsky, philologist and sports executive (d. 1937)
- October 8 - Alexander Sibiryakov, explorer (d. 1933)

== Deaths ==
- April 7 - George Washington Whistler, American engineer working on the Saint Petersburg–Moscow railway, died of cholera (b. 1800)
- July 10 - Grand Duchess Alexandra Alexandrovna of Russia, died of infant meningitis (b. 1842)
- September 9 - Grand Duke Michael Pavlovich of Russia, died of an unknown illness (b. 1798)
