= Vodka protests of 1858–1859 =

The Vodka protests of 1858–1859 (Russian: трезвенное движение 1858—1859 гг.) were organized to boycott the sale and consumption of vodka in the Russian Empire.

== History ==
Russian state budget was depleted during the Crimean War (1853–1856) and the government increased the price for alcohol concessions which, in turn, led to nearly tripling of retail vodka prices to 8–10 rubles per bucket.

The protests originated in September 1858 in the Kovno Governorate, a Catholic province of Tsarist Lithuania, where local villagers took oaths to abstain from drinking vodka, and all other hard liquors except for 'medicinal purposes'. Non-distilled alcohol, such as wine or beer, was still permitted. Supported by the local Catholic clergy, the protesters established local chapters of the Brotherhood of Sobriety (Polish: Bractwo Trzeźwości), a temperance society that originated in 1844 in Silesia and received official approval from Pope Pius IX in 1851.

By early 1859, the protests had spread to the Orthodox population of the Empire, including much of European Russia, where more and more peasants took oaths of abstention from vodka. In total, there were reports of the boycott actions from 91 uyezds in 32 governorates. The newspaper Kolokol promoted the cause, denouncing the vodka tax farming system that promoted alcohol addiction and poverty among the population in return for tax revenues. Alcohol sales plummeted, with prices dropping to 0.5 rubles a bucket, and in some localities retailers resorted to offering free vodka. In Kovno Governorate, alcohol sales dropped by 70%.

In May 1859, the protests turned violent, as taverns came under attack, and the army was called to suppress the movement. The protesters were flogged and forced to drink by having liquor poured into their mouths through funnels, and then imprisoned as rebels. Some 780 people were arrested and temperance societies were outlawed in 1863. The government replaced the alcohol concessions with an excise tax.

== See also ==
- Alcohol consumption in Russia
