= Judah Idel Scherschewsky =

Lithuanian Talmudist and Hebraist

- Born: 1804
- Died: September 20, 1866 (aged 61–62); Kovno, Russian Empire
- Writing career
- Language: Hebrew

Judah Idel Scherschewsky (Yiddish: יהודה אידל שערשעווסקי; 1804 – 20 September 1866, Kovno) was a Lithuanian Talmudist and Hebraist.

After having studied Talmud and rabbinics under Jacob Meïr Yalovker, Scherschewski was employed in one of the business establishments in Vilna, where, in his spare hours, he occupied himself reading rabbinical works and studying the literature of the Haskalah movement. In 1852 he was appointed teacher of Talmud and rabbinics in the Vilna Rabbinical School, which position he held until his death.

Scherschewski was the author of Oz melekh (Vilna, 1857), a sermon and a hymn on the occasion of the coronation of Alexander II of Russia. His Kur la-zahav is in two parts; the first part (Vilna, 1858) is a commentary on 109 difficult aggadic passages of both Talmuds, preceded by a long introduction treating of the Aggadah in general; the second part (Vilna, 1866) contains an essay on the religious dogmas and views of the ancient Talmudists and a commentary on 138 aggadic passages. Several sermons of Scherschewski's are to be found in the Kovetz derushim, a collection of sermons preached by the teachers of the Vilna rabbinical seminary and published at the expense of the Russian government (Vilna, 1864). He was a constant contributor to Ha-Karmel during the closing years of his life, and contributed many articles to various other Hebrew periodicals also.
