= Rosa Pavlovsky de Rosemberg =

Argentine physician (1862–1936)

Rosa Pavlovsky de Rosemberg (1862–1936) was a Russian-born Argentine physician.

== Biography ==
She was born in Taganrog to Santiago Pavlovsky and Agafia Gershova, Russian Jews who fled anti-Semitism in the Russian Empire and settled in Argentina along with their children. She devoted her career to pediatrics at the French Hospital in the City of Buenos Aires. She completed her thesis in France and revalidated her credentials in Argentina. She assisted in the fight against a cholera epidemic in Mendoza. She became Chief of Pediatrics and was decorated by the French government with the Legion of Honor.
