= Euphrosinia Kolyupanovskaya =

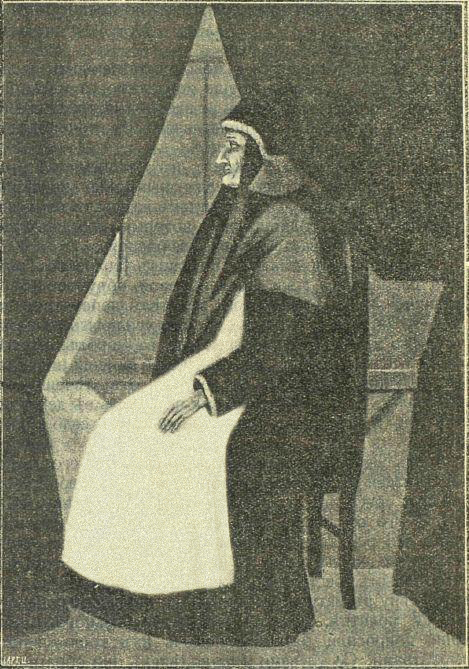
Evfrosiniya Kolupanovskaya 01

Euphrosinia Kolyupanovskaya (1758–1855), was a Russian courtier, Fool of Christ, hermit and Orthodox saint. Originally a lady-in-waiting to Empress Catherine the Great, she left the court to become a hermit. She was canonized a saint in 1988.

== Sources ==
- Суриков И. М. Жизнеописание подвижницы и прозорливицы блаженной старицы Евфросинии, Христа ради юродивой, княжны Вяземской, фрейлины императрицы Екатерины II. — Сергиев Посад, 1911. — 87 с.
