= Diocese of Blagoveshchensk =

Diocese of Blagoveshchensk Благовещенская епархия
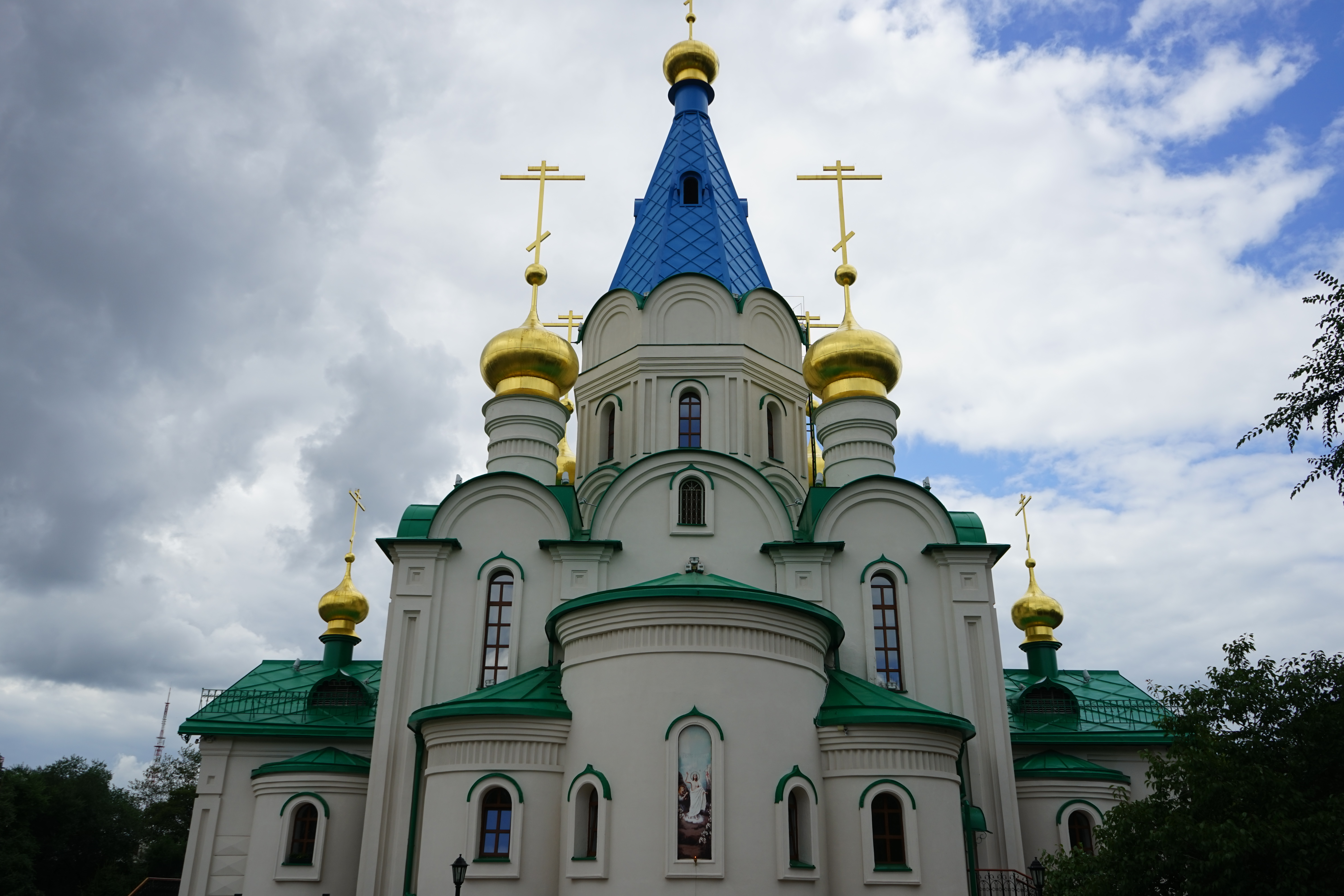

Location
- Territory: 363,700 sqm
- Deaneries: 6
- Headquarters: Barnaul

Statistics
- Parishes: 70

Information
- Denomination: Eastern Orthodox
- Sui iuris church: Russian Orthodox Church
- Established: 1858; 28 December 1993
- Cathedral: Annunciation Cathedral; Trinity Cathedral
- Language: Church Slavonic

Current leadership
- Governance: Eparchy
- Bishop: Lukian Kutsenko since 16 October 2011

Website
- www.blaginform.ru

The Diocese of Blagoveshchensk (Russian: Благовещенская епархия) is a diocese (eparchy) of the Russian Orthodox Church, uniting parishes and monasteries within the Amur Oblast. It has two cathedrals, the Annunciation Cathedral in Blagoveshchensk and Trinity Cathedral in Tynda.

== History ==
In 1858, Bishop Innokenty (Veniaminov) transferred the see of the Kamchatka diocese from Yakutsk to Blagoveshchensk. Since 1870, the name of the diocese has been Kamchatka and Blagoveshchensk. In 1871, the first Annunciation Theological Seminary in the Russian Far East was opened.

On January 1, 1899, the diocese was divided into Blagoveshchensk and Vladivostok. The Okhotsk district of the Primorsky Krai was transferred to the Yakutsk diocese. The diocese belonged to churches located along the entire course of the Amur, starting from the village of Pokrovskaya to Nikolaevsk, with the sea coast from the Gulf of St. Nicholas, the Sea of Okhotsk to the Imperial Harbor in the Tatar Strait, the entire course of the Zeya, Bureya, Amguni rivers with their systems, as well as everything lower the course of the Ussuri River from the village of Busse to its confluence with the Amur. In total - 87 parishes and 16 camps of the Spiritual Mission.

By 1917, the Blagoveshchensk diocese already had 96 churches, 2 monasteries, 83 parochial schools (more than 4 thousand students). The diocesan clergy consisted of 91 priests and 17 deacons. In Blagoveshchensk alone there were more than 20 Orthodox churches.

After the revolution, all the churches were destroyed by the communists. Since the mid-1930s, the Annunciation See has not been replaced. In 1946, the territory of the former Blagoveshchensk diocese became part of the newly established Khabarovsk diocese (in 1949-1988 it was governed by the Irkutsk bishops). In 1946, an Orthodox parish was opened in Blagoveshchensk, to which the building of the former church (built in 1903) was transferred, since not a single Orthodox church remained in the city.

In 1991–1993, Blagoveshchensk was the second cathedral city of the Khabarovsk and Blagoveshchensk diocese.

On December 28, 1993, by decision of the Holy Synod of the Russian Orthodox Church, the Annunciation Diocese was established, which was temporarily ruled by Bishop Innokenty (Vasiliev) of Khabarovsk. On April 21, 1994, Gabriel (Steblyuchenko) was appointed Bishop of Blagoveshchensk; by this time, three parishes were operating in the territory of the new diocese.

== Bishops ==
- February 9, 1899 - September 24, 1900 - Innocent (Solodchin)
- December 17, 1900 - November 3, 1906 - Nicodemus (Bokov)
- November 3, 1906 - May 22, 1909 - Vladimir (Blagorazumov)
- May 22, 1909 - July 11, 1914 - Eugene (Berezhkov)
- July 11, 1914 - August 13, 1930 - Eugene (Zernov)
- December 1928 - 1930 - Panteleimon (Maksunov) (temporary), Bishop of Vladivostok
- September 12, 1930 - September 19, 1932 - Innocent (Tikhonov)
- 1930-1931 - Trophim (Yakobchuk) (temporary), Bishop of Khabarovsk
- October 2, 1932 - 1935 - Herman (Kokkel)
- December 28, 1993 - April 21, 1994 - Innocent (Vasiliev) locum tenens, Bishop of Khabarovsk
- April 21, 1994 - October 5, 2011 - Gabriel (Steblyuchenko)
- October 16, 2011 – present - Lucian (Kutsenko)

== Deaneries ==
- Central Deanery
- Belogorsk and Mazanovsky deanery
- Bureyskoye and Arkharinskoye deanery
- Shimanovskoe and Skovorodino deanery
- Northern Deanery
- Svobodnenskoye Deanery
