= Timeline of Russian history =

This is a timeline of Russian history, comprising important legal and territorial changes and political events in Russia and its predecessor states. To read about the background to these events, see history of Russia. See also list of Russian monarchs and list of heads of state of Russia.

Dates before 31 January 1918, when the Bolshevik government adopted the Gregorian calendar, are given in the Old Style Julian calendar.

== 9th century ==
Year	Date	Event
862		Rurik came to rule in Novgorod, establishing the Rurikid Dynasty.
882		Oleg the Wise conquered Kiev and moved the capital there.

== 10th century ==
Year	Date	Event
907		Rus'–Byzantine War (907): Oleg led an army to the walls of Constantinople.
907		Rus'-Byzantine War (907): A Rus'-Byzantine Treaty allowed Rus' merchants to enter the city under guard.
912		Oleg died and was succeeded by Igor, who was Rurik's son.
941	May	Rus'–Byzantine War (941): A Rus' army landed at Bithynia.
941	September	Rus'–Byzantine War (941): The Byzantines destroyed the Rus' fleet.
945		Rus'-Byzantine War (941): Another Rus'-Byzantine Treaty was signed. Rus' renounced some Byzantine territories.
945		Igor died; his wife Olga became regent of Kievan Rus' for their son, Sviatoslav I.
957 or 962		Olga's regency ended.
965		Sviatoslav conquered Khazaria.
968		Siege of Kiev (968): The Pechenegs besieged Kiev. A Rus' created the illusion of a much larger army, and frightened them away.
969	8 July	Sviatoslav moved the capital from Kiev to Pereyaslavets in Bulgaria.
971		The Byzantine Empire captured Pereyaslavets. The capital moved back to Kiev.
972		Sviatoslav was killed by the Pechenegs during an expedition on their territory. His son Yaropolk I succeeded him.
978		Yaropolk was betrayed and murdered by his brother Vladimir the Great, who succeeded him as Prince of Kiev.
981		Vladimir conquered Red Ruthenia from the Poles.
988		Christianization of Kievan Rus': Vladimir destroyed the pagan idols of Kiev and urged the city's inhabitants to baptize themselves in the Dnieper River.

== 11th century ==
Year	Date	Event
1015	15 July	Vladimir died. He was succeeded by Sviatopolk I, who may have been his biological son by the rape of Yaropolk's wife. Sviatopolk ordered the murder of three of Vladimir's younger sons.
1016		Yaroslav I, another of Sviatopolk's brothers, led an army against him and defeated him, forcing him to flee to Poland.
1017		Yaroslav issued the first Russian code of law, the Russkaya Pravda.
1018		Polish Expedition to Kiev: Sviatopolk led the Polish army into Rus'. Red Ruthenia returned to Polish possession.
1018	14 August	Polish Expedition to Kiev: The Polish army captured Kiev; Yaroslav fled to Novgorod.
1019		Yaroslav defeated Sviatopolk and returned to the princedom of Kiev. He granted autonomy to Novgorod as a reward for her prior loyalty. Sviatopolk died.
1030		Yaroslav reconquered Red Ruthenia from the Poles.
1043	30 February	Rus'–Byzantine War (1043): Yaroslav led an unsuccessful naval raid on Constantinople. According to the peace settlement, Yaroslav's son Vsevolod I married a daughter of the Byzantine emperor Constantine IX Monomachos.
1054		Yaroslav died. He was succeeded by his oldest son, Iziaslav I.
1068		Iziaslav was overthrown in a popular uprising and forced to flee to Poland.
1069		Iziaslav led the Polish army back into Kiev and reestablished himself on the throne.
1073		Two of Iziaslav's brothers, Sviatoslav II and Vsevolod I, overthrew him; the former became prince of Kiev.
1076	27 December	Sviatoslav died. Vsevolod I succeeded him, but traded the princedom of Kiev to Iziaslav in exchange for Chernigov.
1078	3 October	Iziaslav died. The throne of Kiev went to Vsevolod.
1093	13 April	Vsevolod died. Kiev and Chernigov went to Iziaslav's illegitimate son, Sviatopolk II.
1093	26 May	Battle of the Stugna River: Rus' forces attacked the Cumans at the Stugna River and were defeated.

== 12th century ==
Year	Date	Event
1113	16 April	Sviatopolk died. He was succeeded by Vsevolod's son, his cousin, Vladimir II Monomakh.
1125	19 May	Vladimir died. His oldest son, Mstislav I, succeeded him.
1132	14 April	Mstislav died. His brother Yaropolk II followed him as prince of Kiev.
1136		Novgorod expelled the prince appointed for them by Kiev and vastly circumscribed the authority of the office.
1139	18 February	Yaropolk died. His younger brother Viacheslav followed him, but in March Viacheslav was overthrown by his cousin, prince of Chernigov, Vsevolod.
1146	1 August	Vsevolod died. His brother Igor followed him as a ruler of Kiev. Citizens of Kiev required him to depose old boyars of Vsevolod. Igor swore to fulfill their request, but then reconsidered to do it. Citizens of Kiev considered that oath-breaker is not a legitimate ruler anymore and chose to summon prince Iziaslav of Pereyaslavl to be a new prince of Kiev.
1146	13 August	Iziaslav overthrow Igor. A brother of Igor, Sviatoslav, prince of Novgorod-Seversk asked prince of Rostov-Suzdal Yuri Dolgorukiy for help in realising Igor from captivity.
1147		The first reference to Moscow when Yuri Dolgorukiy called upon Sviatoslav of Novgorod-Seversk to "come to me, brother, to Moscow".
1149		Yuri Dolgorukiy captured Kiev. Iziaslav escaped.
1150		With assistance of Black Klobuks Iziaslav kicked away Yuri from Kiev. After some time, with help of Volodimirko of Galych, Yuri took Kiev again.
1151		Hungarian king Géza II helped Iziaslav to return Kiev. Yuri escaped
1154	13 November	Iziaslav II died. His brother, prince of Smolensk Rostislav was summoned to become a new prince of Kiev.
1155		Yuri Dolgorukiy expelled Rostislav with assistance of prince of Chernigov.
1157		Yuri I was intoxicated and died. Iziaslav of Chernigov became prince of Kiev.
1159		Iziaslav of Chernigov was overthrown by princes of Galych and Volyn. Allies called Rostislav to be prince of Kiev again.
1167		Rostislav died. His nephew, Mstislav of Volyn, became new ruler of Kiev.
1169		Andrey Bogolyubsky, the elder son of Yuri Dolgorukiy, prince of new strong principality of Vladimir-Suzdal attacked and plundered Kiev. A majority of Russian princes recognized him as a new grand prince. Unlike previous grand princes Andrey I did not move his residence to Kiev, instead remaining in Vladimir. Andrey appointed his brother Gleb as prince of Kiev. From this time, Kiev stopped being the center of Russian lands. The political and cultural center was moved to Vladimir. New princes of Kiev became dependent on the grand princes of Vladimir-Suzdal

== 13th century ==
Year	Date	Event
1223		Battle of the Kalka River: The warriors of Rus' first encountered the Mongol armies of Genghis Khan.
1227		Boyar intrigues forced Mstislav, the prince of Novgorod, to give the throne to his son-in-law Andrew II of Hungary.
1236		Alexander Nevsky was summoned by the Novgorodians to become Grand Prince of Novgorod and, as their military leader, to defend their northwest lands from Swedish and German invaders.
1237	December	Mongol invasion of Rus: Batu Khan set fire to Moscow and slaughtered and enslaved its civilian inhabitants.
1240	15 July	Battle of the Neva: The Novgorodian army defeated a Swedish invasion force at the confluence of the Izhora and Neva Rivers.
1242	5 April	Battle on the Ice: The army of Novgorod defeated the invading Teutonic Knights on the frozen surface of Lake Peipus.
1263	14 November	Nevsky died. His appanages were divided within his family; his youngest son Daniel became the first Prince of Moscow. His younger brother Yaroslav of Tver had become the Grand Prince of Tver and of Vladimir and had appointed deputies to run the Principality of Moscow during Daniel's minority.

== 14th century ==
Year	Date	Event
1303	5 March	Daniel died. His oldest son Yury succeeded him as Prince of Moscow.
1317		Yury married the sister of Uzbeg Khan who was Mongolian prince. Uzbeg deposed the Grand Prince of Vladimir and appointed Yury to that office.
1322		Dmitry the Terrible Eyes, the son of the last Grand Prince of Vladimir, convinced Uzbeg Khan that Yury had been stealing from the khan's tribute money. He was reappointed to the princedom of Vladimir.
1325	21 November	Yury was murdered by Dmitry. His younger brother Ivan I Kalita succeeded him.
1327	15 August	The ambassador of the Golden Horde of Mongolian Empire was trapped and burned alive during an uprising in the Grand Duchy of Tver.
1328		Ivan led a Horde army against the Grand Prince of Tver, also the Grand Prince of Vladimir. Ivan was allowed to replace him in the latter office.
1340	31 March	Ivan died. His son Simeon succeeded him both as Grand Prince of Moscow and as Grand Prince of Vladimir
1353		Simeon died. His younger brother Ivan II, The Fair, succeeded him as Grand Prince of Moscow.
1359	13 November	Ivan died. His son, Dmitri Donskoi, succeeded him.
1380	8 September	Battle of Kulikovo: A Muscovite force defeated a significantly larger Blue Horde army of Mongolia at Kulikovo Field.
1382		The Mongol khan Tokhtamysh reasserted his power by looting and burning Moscow.
1389	19 May	Dmitri died. The throne fell to his son, Vasili I.

== 15th century ==
Year	Date	Event
1425	February	Vasili I died. His son Vasili II, succeeded him as Grand Prince of Moscow; his wife Sophia became regent. His younger brother, Yury Dmitrievich of Zvenigorod, also issued a claim to the throne.
1430		Yury appealed to the khan of the Golden Horde to support his claim to the throne. Vasili II retained the Duchy of Moscow, but Yury was given the Duchy of Dmitrov.
1432		Muscovite Civil War: Vasili II led an army to capture Dmitrov. His army was defeated and he was forced to flee to Kolomna. Yury arrived in Moscow and declared himself the Grand Prince. Vasili II was pardoned and made mayor of Kolomna.
1433		Muscovite Civil War: The exodus of Muscovite boyars to Vasili II's court in Kolomna persuaded Yury to return Moscow to his nephew and move to Galich.
1434		Muscovite Civil War: Vasily II burned Galich.
1434	16 March	Muscovite Civil War: The army of Yury Dmitrievich defeated the army of Vasily II. The latter fled to Nizhny Novgorod.
1434	1 April	Muscovite Civil War: Yury arrived in Moscow and again declared himself the Grand Prince.
1434	5 July	Yury died. His oldest son Vasily the Squint, succeeded him as Grand Prince.
1435		Muscovite Civil War: Yury's second son, Dmitry Shemyaka, allied himself with Vasily II. Vasily the Squint was expelled from the Kremlin and blinded. Vasili II returned to the throne of the Grand Prince.
1438		Russo-Kazan Wars: The khan of the recently established Khanate of Kazan led an army towards Moscow.
1445	7 July	Battle of Suzdal: The Russian army suffered a great defeat at the hands of the Tatars of Kazan. Vasili II was taken prisoner; operation of the government fell to Dmitry Shemyaka.
1445	December	Muscovite Civil War: Vasili II was ransomed back to Muscovy.
1446		Muscovite Civil War: Shemyaka had Vasili II blinded and exiled to Uglich, and had himself declared the Grand Prince.
1450		Muscovite Civil War: The boyars of Moscow expelled Shemyaka from the Kremlin and recalled Vasili II to the throne.
1452		Muscovite Civil War: Shemyaka was forced to flee to the Novgorod Republic.
1453		Shemyaka was poisoned by Muscovite agents.
1462	27 March	Vasili II died. His son Ivan III, The Great, succeeded him as Grand Prince.
1463		Grand Duchy of Moscow annexed the Duchy of Yaroslavl.
1471	14 July	Battle of Shelon: A Muscovite army defeated a numerically superior Novgorodian force.
1474		Grand Duchy of Moscow annexed the Rostov Duchy.
1476		Ivan stopped paying tribute to the Great Horde.
1478	14 January	The Novgorod Republic surrendered to the authority of Moscow.
1480	11 November	Great stand on the Ugra river: Ivan's forces deterred Akhmat Khan of the Great Horde from invading Muscovy.
1485		Ivan annexed the Grand Duchy of Tver.
1497		Ivan issued a legal code, the Sudebnik, which standardized the Muscovite law, expanded the role of the criminal justice system, and limited the ability of the serfs to leave their masters.

== 16th century ==
Year	Date	Event
1505	29 October	Ivan died. He was succeeded as Grand Duke of Muscovy by his son, Vasili III.
1507		Russo-Crimean Wars: The Crimean Khanate raided the Muscovite towns of Belyov and Kozelsk.
1510		With the approval of most of the local nobility, Vasili arrived in the Pskov Republic and declared it dissolved.
1517		The last Grand Prince of the Ryazan Principality was captured and imprisoned in Moscow.
1533	3 December	Vasili died; his son Ivan IV, The Terrible, succeeded him. His wife Elena Glinskaya became regent.
1538	4 April	Glinskaya died. She was succeeded as regent by Prince Vasily Nemoy.
1547	16 January	An elaborate ceremony crowned Ivan the first Tsar of Russia.
1552	22 August	Siege of Kazan (1552): Russian armed forces arrived at Kazan.
1552	2 October	Siege of Kazan (1552): The Russian army breached the walls of Kazan.
1552	13 October	Siege of Kazan (1552): The civilian population of Kazan was massacred, the city occupied.
1553–1554		First book printed in Russia, the Narrow-typed Gospel Book.
1556		Russia conquered and annexed the Astrakhan Khanate.
1558		Livonian War: Ivan demanded a back-breaking tribute from the Bishopric of Dorpat. The Bishop sent diplomats to Moscow to renegotiate the amount; Ivan expelled them and invaded and occupied the Bishopric.
1560	2 August	Battle of Ergeme: Ivan's army crushed the forces of the Livonian Order.
1561	28 November	Livonian War: The Livonian Order agreed to the Union of Wilno, under which the Livonian Confederation was partitioned between Lithuania, Sweden and Denmark. Lithuania and Sweden sent troops to liberate their new territories from Russian possession.
1565	February	Ivan established the Oprichnina, a territory ruled directly by the tsar.
1569	1 July	The Union of Lublin was signed. Poland and the Grand Duchy of Lithuania were merged into the Polish–Lithuanian Commonwealth; Poland began aiding Lithuania in its war against Russia.
1572		The Oprichnina was abolished.
1581	16 November	Ivan killed his oldest son.
1582	15 January	Livonian War: The Peace of Jam Zapolski ended Polish–Lithuanian participation in the war. Russia gave up its claims to Livonia and the city of Polatsk.
1582	23 October	Battle of Chuvash Cape: Russian soldiers dispersed the armed forces of the Siberia Khanate from its capital, Qashliq.
1583		Livonian War: The war was ended with the Treaty of Plussa. Narva and the Gulf of Finland coast went to Sweden.
1584	18 March	Ivan died. The throne fell to his intellectually disabled son Feodor I; his son-in-law Boris Godunov took de facto charge of government.
1590	18 January	Russo-Swedish War (1590–1595): The Treaty of Plussa expired. Russian troops laid siege to Narva.
1590	25 February	Russo-Swedish War (1590–1595): A Swedish governor on the disputed territory surrendered to Russians.
1591	15 May	Dimitry Ivanovich, Ivan the Terrible's youngest son, died in exile from a stab wound to the throat. Long-regarded as murdered by agents of Boris Godunov, more recently scholars have begun to defend the theory that Dimitry's death was self-inflicted during an epileptic seizure.
1595	18 May	Russo-Swedish War (1590–1595): The Treaty of Tyavzino was signed. Ingria went to Russia.
1598	7 January	Feodor I died with no children giving a start to Time of Troubles
1598	21 February	A zemsky sobor elected Godunov the first non-Rurikid tsar of Russia.

== 17th century ==
Year	Date	Event
1601–03		Devastating famine, that undermined Boris's authority.
1604	October	False Dmitriy I, a man claiming to be the deceased Dmitriy Ivanovich, son of Ivan IV, invaded Russia with help of Polish–Lithuanian Commonwealth
1605	13 April	Boris died. His son Feodor II was pronounced tsar.
1605	1 June	A group of boyars defected in support of False Dmitriy, seized control of the Kremlin, and arrested Feodor.
1605	20 June	False Dmitriy and his army arrived in Moscow. Feodor and his mother were strangled.
1605	21 July	False Dmitriy was crowned tsar.
1606	8 May	False Dmitriy married a Catholic, Marina Mniszech, inflaming suspicions that he meant to convert Russia to Catholicism.
1606	17 May	Conservative boyars led by Vasili Shuisky stormed the Kremlin and shot False Dmitriy to death during his escape.
1606	19 May	Shuisky's allies declared him Tsar Vasili IV.
1607		False Dmitriy II, another claimant to the identity of Dmitriy Ivanovich, obtained financial and military support from a group of Polish magnates
1609	28 February	Vasili Shuisky ceded border territory to Sweden in exchange for military aid against the government of False Dmitriy II; around this time Smolensk got besieged
1609	September	Polish–Muscovite War (1609–1618): The Polish king Sigismund III led an army into Russia;
1610	4 July	Battle of Klushino: Seven thousand Polish cavalrymen defeated a vastly superior Russian force at Klushino.
1610	19 July	Vasili was overthrown. A group of nobles, the Seven Boyars, replaced him at the head of the government.
1610	27 July	Polish–Russian War (1609–1618): A truce was established. The boyars promised to recognize Sigismund's son and heir Władysław as tsar, conditional on severe limits to his power and his conversion to Orthodoxy.
1610	August	Polish–Russian War (1609–1618): Sigismund rejected the boyars' conditions.
1610	December	Hermogenes, the patriarch of the Russian Orthodox Church, urged the Muscovite people to rise against the Poles.
1610	11 December	False Dmitriy II was shot and beheaded by one of his entourage.
1612	1 November	Polish–Russian War (1609–1618): Muscovite populace rising against the Poles recaptured the Kremlin.
1613		Ingrian War: Sweden invaded Russia.
1613	21 February	A zemsky sobor elected Michael Romanov, a grandson of Ivan the Terrible's brother-in-law, the tsar of Russia.
1617	27 February	Ingrian War: The Treaty of Stolbovo ended the war. Kexholm, Ingria, Estonia and Livonia went to Sweden.
1618	11 December	Polish–Russian War (1609–1618): The Truce of Deulino ended the war. Russia ceded the city of Smolensk and the Czernihów Voivodeship to Poland.
1619	13 February	Feodor Romanov, Michael's father, was released from Polish prison and allowed to return to Moscow.
1632	October	Smolensk War: With the expiration of the Truce of Deulino, a Russian army was sent to lay siege to Smolensk.
1634	1 March	Smolensk War: The Russian army, surrounded, was forced to surrender.
1634	14 June	Smolensk War: The Treaty of Polyanovka was signed, ending the war. Poland retained Smolensk, but Władysław renounced his claim to the Russian throne.
1645	13 July	Michael died. His son, Alexis, succeeded him.
1648	25 January	Khmelnytsky Uprising: A Polish szlachta, Bohdan Khmelnytsky, leads the Cossacks of the Zaporizhian Sich against the Polish Crown.
1648	1 June	Salt Riot: Upset over the introduction of a salt tax, the townspeople launched a rebellion in Moscow.
1648	11 June	Salt Riot: A group of nobles demanded a zemsky sobor on behalf of the rebellion.
1648	3 July	Salt Riot: Many of the rebellion's leaders were executed.
1648	25 December	Khmelnytsky Uprising: Khmelnytsky entered the Ukrainian capital, Kiev.
1649	January	A zemsky sobor ratified a new legal code, the Sobornoye Ulozheniye.
1653		Raskol: Nikon, the Patriarch of Moscow, reformed Russian liturgy to align with the rituals of the Greek Church.
1654	January	Khmelnytsky Uprising: Under the Treaty of Pereyaslav, Left-bank Ukraine, the territory of the Zaporozhian Host, allies itself with Russia.
1654	March–April	Raskol: Nikon arranges a church council, which decides to correct Russian divine service books using ancient Greek and Slavic manuscripts.
1654	July	Russo-Polish War (1654–1667): The Russian army invaded Poland.
1655		Swedish Deluge: Sweden invaded the Polish–Lithuanian Commonwealth.
1655	3 July	Russo-Polish War (1654–1667): Russian army captured Vilnius.
1655	25 July	Swedish Deluge: The voivode of Poznań surrendered to the Swedish invaders.
1655	2 November	Russia negotiated a ceasefire with Poland.
1656	July	Russo-Swedish War (1656–1658): Russian reserves invaded Ingria.
1658	26 February	Dano-Swedish War (1657–1658): The Treaty of Roskilde ended Sweden's war with Denmark, allowing her to shift her troops to the eastern conflicts.
1658	10 July	Raskol: Patriarch Nikon leaves Moscow.
1658	16 September	Russo-Polish War (1654–1667): The Treaty of Hadiach established a military alliance between Poland and the Zaporozhian Host, and promised the creation of a Commonwealth of three nations: Poland, Lithuania and Rus'.
1658	28 December	Russo-Swedish War (1656–1658): The Treaty of Valiesar established a peace. The conquered Ingrian territories were ceded to Russia for three years.
1660	23 April	Swedish Deluge: The Treaty of Oliva ended the conflict between Poland and Sweden.
1661		Russo-Polish War (1654–1667): Polish forces recaptured Vilnius.
1661	1 July	The Treaty of Valiesar expired. Russia returned Ingria to the Swedish Empire by the Treaty of Cardis.
1662	25 July	Copper Riot: In the early morning, a group of Muscovites marched to Kolomenskoye and demanded punishment for the government ministers who had debased Russia's copper currency. On their arrival, they were countered by the military; a thousand were hanged or drowned. The rest were exiled.
1665		Lubomirski's Rokosz: A Polish nobleman launched a rokosz (rebellion) against the king.
1665		The pro-Turkish Cossack noble Petro Doroshenko defeated his pro-Russian adversaries in the Right-bank Ukraine.
1666	April–May	Raskol: Great Moscow Synod deposed Nikon from the patriarchy. The Old Believers were anathematized.
1667	30 January	Russo-Polish War (1654–1667): The Treaty of Andrusovo ended the war between Poland and Russia without Cossack representation. Poland agreed to cede the Smoleńsk and Czernihów Voivodships and acknowledged Russian control over the Left-bank Ukraine.
1669		Doroshenko signed a treaty that recognized his state as a vassal state of the Ottoman Empire.
1670		The Cossack Stenka Razin began a rebellion against the Russian government.
1671		Razin was captured, tortured, and quartered in Red Square on the Lobnoye Mesto.
1674		The Cossacks of the Right-bank Ukraine elected the pro-Russian Ivan Samoylovych, Hetman of the Left-bank Ukraine, to replace Doroshenko and become the Hetman of a unified Ukraine.
1676		Russo-Turkish War (1676–1681): The Ottoman army joined Doroshenko's forces in an attack on the Left-bank city of Chyhyryn.
1676	29 January	Alexis died. His son Feodor III became tsar.
1676	1 February	Raskol: The 8-year-long siege of Solovki ended.
1680		Russo-Crimean Wars: The Crimean invasions of Russia ended.
1681	3 January	Russo-Turkish War (1676–1681): The war ended with the Treaty of Bakhchisarai. The Russo-Turkish border was settled at the Dnieper River.
1682	January	Feodor III abolished the mestnichestvo, an ancient, un-meritocratic system of making political appointments.
1682	14 April	Raskol: Avvakum, the most prominent leader of the Old Believer movement, was burned at the stake.
1682	27 April	Feodor died with no children. Peter I, Alexis's son by his second wife Natalia Naryshkina, was declared tsar. His mother became regent.
1682	17 May	Moscow Uprising of 1682: Streltsy regiments belonging to the faction of Alexis's first wife, Maria Miloslavskaya, took over the Kremlin, executed Naryshkina's brothers, and declared Miloslavskaya's invalid son Ivan V the "senior tsar," with Peter remaining on the throne as the junior. Miloslavskaya's oldest daughter Sophia Alekseyevna became regent.
1687	May	Crimean campaigns: Russian army launched an invasion against an Ottoman vassal, the Crimean Khanate.
1687	17 June	Crimean campaigns: Faced with a burned steppe incapable of feeding their horses, Russians turned back.
1689	June	Fyodor Shaklovity, the head of the Streltsy Department, persuaded Sophia to proclaim herself tsarina and attempted to ignite a new rebellion in her support. The streltsy instead defected in support of Peter.
1689	11 October	Shaklovity was executed.
1696	29 January	Ivan V died.
1696	23 April	Second Azov campaign: Russian army began its deployment to an important Ottoman fortress, Azov.
1696	27 May	Second Azov campaign: Russian navy arrived at the sea and blockaded Azov.
1696	19 July	Second Azov campaign: The Ottoman garrison surrendered.
1698	6 June	Streltsy Uprising: Approximately four thousand streltsy overthrew their commanders and headed to Moscow, where they meant to demand the enthroning of the exiled Sophia Alekseyevna.
1698	18 June	Streltsy Uprising: The rebels were defeated.
1700	19 August	Great Northern War: Russia declared war on Sweden.
1700	16 October	Adrian, the patriarch of the Russian Orthodox Church, died. Peter prevented the election of a successor.

== 18th century ==
Year	Date	Event
1703	27 May	Foundation of Saint Petersburg.
1707	8 October	Bulavin Rebellion: A small band of Don Cossacks killed a noble searching their territory for tax fugitives.
1708	7 July	Bulavin Rebellion: After a series of devastating military reversals, Bulavin was shot by his former followers.
1708	18 December	An imperial decree divided Russia into eight guberniyas (governorates).
1709	28 June	Battle of Poltava: A decisive Russian military victory over the Swedes at Poltava marked the turning point of the war, the end of Cossack independence and the dawn of the Russian Empire.
1710	14 October	The Russian guberniyas were divided into lots according to noble population.
1710	20 November	Russo-Turkish War (1710–1711): Charles XII of Sweden persuaded the Ottoman sultan to declare war on Russia.
1711	22 February	Government reform of Peter I: Peter established the Governing Senate to pass laws in his absence.
1711	21 July	Russo-Turkish War (1710–1711): Peace was concluded with the Treaty of the Pruth. Russia returned Azov to the Ottoman Empire and demolished the town of Taganrog.
1713	8 May	The Russian capital was moved from Moscow to Saint Petersburg.
1713	17 July	The Riga Governorate was established on the conquered territory of Livonia.
1713	17 July	The territory of the Smolensk Governorate was divided between the Moscow and Riga Governorates.
1714	15 January	The northwestern territory of the Kazan Governorate was transferred to the newly established Nizhny Novgorod Governorate.
1715	11 October	Peter demanded that his son, the tsarevich Alexei Petrovich, endorse his reforms or renounce his right to the throne.
1716		Alexei fled to Vienna to avoid military service.
1717	22 November	The Astrakhan Governorate was formed on the southern lands of Kazan Governorate.
1717	22 November	The territory of the Nizhny Novgorod Governorate was reincorporated into the Kazan Governorate.
1717	12 December	Government reform of Peter I: Peter established collegia, government ministries that superseded the prikazy.
1718	31 January	Alexei returned to Moscow under a promise he would not be harmed.
1718	18 February	After torture, Alexei publicly renounced the throne and implicated a number of reactionaries in a conspiracy to overthrow his father.
1718	13 June	Alexei was put on trial for treason.
1718	26 June	Alexei died after torture in the Peter and Paul Fortress.
1719	29 May	Lots were abolished; the guberniyas were divided instead into provinces, each governed and taxed under a preexisting elected office (the Voyevoda). Provinces were further divided into districts, replacing the old uyezds. The district commissars were to be elected by local gentry.
1719	29 May	The Nizhny Novgorod Governorate was reestablished.
1719	29 May	The Reval Governorate was established on the conquered territory of Estonia.
1721	25 January	Peter established the Holy Synod, a body of ten clergymen chaired by a secular official, that was to head the Russian Orthodox Church in lieu of the Patriarch of Moscow.
1721	30 August	Great Northern War: The Treaty of Nystad ended the war. Sweden ceded Estonia, Livonia and Ingria to Russia.
1721	22 October	Peter was declared Emperor.
1722		Peter introduced the Table of Ranks, which granted the privileges of nobility based on state service.
1722	July	Russo-Persian War (1722–1723): A Russian military expedition sailed in support of the independence of two Christian kingdoms, Kartli and Armenia.
1723	12 September	Russo-Persian War (1722–1723): The Persian shah signed a peace treaty ceding the cities of Derbent and Baku and the provinces of Shirvan, Guilan, Mazandaran and Astrabad to the Russian Empire.
1725	28 January	Peter died of urinary problems. He failed to name a successor; one of Peter's closest advisers, Aleksandr Menshikov, convinced the Imperial Guard to declare in favor of Peter's wife Catherine I.
1726		The Smolensk Governorate was reestablished.
1726	8 February	Catherine established an advisory body, the Supreme Privy Council.
1727		Catherine established the Belgorod and Novgorod Governorates and adjusted the borders of several others. Districts were abolished; uyezds were reestablished.
1727	17 May	Catherine died.
1727	18 May	According to Catherine's wishes the eleven-year-old Peter II, the son of Alexei Petrovich and grandson of Peter the Great, became emperor. The Supreme Privy Council was to hold power during his minority.
1727	9 September	The conservative members of the Supreme Privy Council expelled its most powerful member, the liberal Menshikov.
1730	30 January	Peter died of smallpox.
1730	1 February	The Supreme Privy Council offered the throne to Anna Ivanovna, the daughter of Ivan V, on the conditions that the Council retain the powers of war and peace and taxation, among others, and that she never marry or appoint an heir.
1730	4 March	Anna tore up the terms of her accession and dissolved the Supreme Privy Council.
1736	20 May	Russo-Turkish War (1735–1739): The Russian army captured the Ottoman fortifications at Perekop.
1736	19 June	Russo-Turkish War (1735–1739): The Russians captured Azov.
1737	July	Russo-Turkish War (1735–1739): Austria joined the war on the Russian side.
1739	21 August	Russo-Turkish War (1735–1739): Austria agreed by the Treaty of Belgrade to end its participation in the war.
1739	18 September	Russo-Turkish War (1735–1739): The Treaty of Nissa ended the war. Russia gave up its claims on Crimea and Moldavia and its navy was barred from the Black Sea.
1740	17 October	Anna died of kidney disease. She left the throne to her adopted infant son, Ivan VI.
1740	18 October	Anna's lover, Ernst Johann von Biron, was declared regent.
1740	8 November	Biron was arrested on the orders of his rival, the Count Burkhard Christoph von Munnich. Ivan's biological mother, Anna Leopoldovna, replaced Biron as regent.
1741	8 August	Russo-Swedish War (1741–1743): Sweden declared war on Russia.
1741	25 November	Elizabeth, the youngest daughter of Peter the Great, led the Preobrazhensky regiment to the Winter Palace to overthrow the regency of Anna Leopoldovna and install herself as empress.
1741	2 December	Ivan was imprisoned in the Daugavgriva fortress.
1742	4 September	Russo-Swedish War (1741–1743): Encircled by the Russians at Helsinki, the Swedish army surrendered.
1743	7 August	Russo-Swedish War (1741–1743): The Treaty of Åbo was signed, ending the war. Russia relinquished most of the conquered territory, keeping only the lands east of the Kymi River. In exchange Adolf Frederick of Holstein-Gottorp, the uncle of the Russian heir to the throne, was to become King of Sweden.
1744		The Vyborg Governorate was established on conquered Swedish territories.
1755		Mikhail Lomonosov and Count Ivan Shuvalov founded the University of Moscow.
1756	29 August	Seven Years' War: The Kingdom of Prussia invaded the Austrian protectorate of Saxony.
1757	1 May	Diplomatic Revolution: Under the Second Treaty of Versailles, Russia joined the Franco-Austrian military alliance.
1757	17 May	Seven Years' War: Russian troops entered the war.
1761	25 December	Miracle of the House of Brandenburg: Elizabeth died. Her nephew, Peter III, became emperor.
1762	5 May	Seven Years' War: The Treaty of Saint Petersburg ended Russian participation in the war at no territorial gain.
1762	17 July	Peter was overthrown by the Imperial Guard and replaced with his wife, Catherine II, The Great, on her orders.
1764	5 July	A group of soldiers attempted to release the imprisoned Ivan VI; he was murdered.
1767	10 August	The Instruction of Catherine the Great is issued to the Legislative Commission.
1767	13 October	Repnin Sejm: Four Polish senators who opposed the policies of the Russian ambassador Nicholas Repnin were arrested by Russian troops and imprisoned in Kaluga.
1768	27 February	Repnin Sejm: Delegates of the Sejm adopted a treaty ensuring future Russian influence in Polish internal politics.
1768	29 February	Polish nobles established the Bar Confederation in order to end Russian influence in their country.
1768	25 September	Russo-Turkish War (1768–1774): The Ottoman sultan declared war on Russia.
1771	15 September	Plague Riot: A crowd of rioters entered Red Square, broke into the Kremlin and destroyed the Chudov Monastery.
1771	17 September	Plague Riot: The army suppressed the riot.
1772	5 August	The first partition of Poland was announced. Poland lost 30% of its territory, which was divided between Prussia, Austria, and Russia.
1773		Pugachev's Rebellion: The army of the Cossack Yemelyan Pugachev attacked and occupied Samara.
1773	18 September	A confederated sejm was forced to ratify the first partition of Poland.
1774	21 July	Russo-Turkish War (1768–1774): The Treaty of Küçük Kaynarca was signed. The portion of the Yedisan region east of the Southern Bug river, the Kabarda region in the Caucasus, and several Crimean ports, went to Russia. The Crimean Khanate received independence from the Ottoman Empire, which also declared Russia the protector of Christians on its territory.
1774	14 September	Pugachev's Rebellion: Upset with the rebellion's bleak outlook, Pugachev's officers delivered him to the Russians.
1783	8 April	The Crimean Khanate was incorporated into the Russian Empire.
1783	24 July	Threatened by the Persian and Ottoman Empires, the kingdom of Kartl-Kakheti signed the Treaty of Georgievsk under which it became a Russian protectorate.
1788		Russo-Turkish War (1787–1792): The Ottoman Empire declared war on Russia and imprisoned her ambassador.
1788	27 June	Russo-Swedish War (1788–1790): The Swedish army playacted a skirmish between themselves and the Russians.
1788	6 July	Battle of Hogland: The Russian navy dispersed a Swedish invasion fleet near Hogland in the Gulf of Finland.
1788	6 October	Great Sejm: A confederated sejm was called to restore the Polish–Lithuanian Commonwealth.
1790	14 August	Russo-Swedish War (1788–1790): The Treaty of Värälä ended the war, with no changes in territory.
1791	3 May	Great Sejm: Poland's Constitution of 3 May was ratified in secret. The new constitution abolished the liberum veto, reducing the power of the nobles and limiting Russia's ability to influence Polish internal politics.
1791	23 December	Catherine established the Pale of Settlement, an area in European Russia into which Russian Jews were transported.
1792	9 January	Russo-Turkish War (1787–1792): The Treaty of Jassy was signed, ending the war. The Russian border in Yedisan was extended to the Dniester river.
1792	18 May	Polish–Russian War of 1792: The army of the Targowica Confederation, which opposed the liberal Polish Constitution of 3 May, invaded Poland.
1793	23 January	Polish–Russian War of 1792: The second partition of Poland left the country with one-third of its 1772 population.
1793	23 November	Grodno Sejm: The last sejm of the Polish–Lithuanian Commonwealth ratified the second partition.
1794	24 March	Kościuszko Uprising: An announcement by Tadeusz Kościuszko sparked a nationalist uprising in Poland.
1794	4 November	Battle of Praga: Russian troops captured the Praga borough of Warsaw and massacred its civilian population.
1794	5 November	Kościuszko Uprising: The uprising ended with the Russian occupation of Warsaw.
1795	11 September	Battle of Krtsanisi: The Persian army demolished the armed forces of Kartl-Kakheti.
1795	24 October	The third partition of Poland divided up the remainder of its territory.
1796	April	Persian Expedition of 1796: Catherine launched a military expedition to punish Persia for its incursion into the Russian protectorate of Kartl-Kakheti.
1796	5 November	Catherine suffered a stroke in the bathtub.
1796	6 November	Catherine died. The throne fell to her son, Paul I.

== 19th century ==
Year	Date	Event
1801	8 January	Paul authorized the incorporation of Kartl-Kakheti into the Russian empire.
1801	11 March	Paul was killed in his bed.
1801	23 March	Paul's son, Alexander I, ascended to the throne.
1802	September	Alexander established the Ministry of Internal Affairs (MVD).
1804		Russo-Persian War (1804–1813): Russian forces attacked the Persian settlement of Üçkilise.
1805		The Ottoman Empire dismissed the pro-Russian hospodars of its vassal states, Wallachia and Moldavia.
1805	26 December	War of the Third Coalition: The Treaty of Pressburg ceded Austrian possessions in Dalmatia to France.
1806	October	To counter the French presence in Dalmatia, Russia invaded Wallachia and Moldavia.
1806	27 December	Russo-Turkish War (1806–1812): The Ottoman Empire declared war on Russia.
1807	14 June	Battle of Friedland: The Russian army suffered a defeat against the French, suffering twenty thousand dead.
1807	7 July	The Treaty of Tilsit was signed. Alexander agreed to evacuate Wallachia and Moldavia and ceded the Ionian Islands and Cattaro to the French. The treaty ended Russia's conflict with France; Napoleon promised to aid Russia in conflicts with the Ottoman Empire.
1807	16 November	Alexander demanded that Sweden close the Baltic Sea to British warships.
1808	21 February	Finnish War: Russian troops crossed the Swedish border and captured Hämeenlinna.
1809	29 March	Diet of Porvoo: The four Estates of Finland swore allegiance to the Russian crown.
1809	17 September	Finnish War: The Treaty of Fredrikshamn was signed, ending the war and ceding Finland to the Russian Empire.
1810		The first military settlement was established near Klimovichi.
1810	1 January	Alexander established the State Council, which received the executive powers of the Governing Senate.
1810	20 February	The Russian government proclaimed the deposition of Solomon II from the throne of Imereti.
1811	27 March	Regional military companies were merged into the Internal Guard.
1812	28 May	Russo-Turkish War (1806–1812): The Treaty of Bucharest ended the war and transferred Bessarabia to Russia.
1812	24 June	French invasion of Russia (1812): The French army crossed the Neman River into Russia.
1812	14 September	French invasion of Russia (1812): The French army entered a deserted Moscow, the high-water mark of their invasion.
1812	14 December	French invasion of Russia (1812): The last French troops were forced off of Russian territory.
1813	24 October	Russo-Persian War (1804–1813): According to the Treaty of Gulistan, the Persian Empire ceded its Transcaucasian territories to Russia.
1815	9 June	Congress of Vienna: The territory of the Duchy of Warsaw was divided between Prussia, Russia, and three newly established states: the Grand Duchy of Posen, the Free City of Kraków and Congress Poland. The latter was a constitutional monarchy with Alexander as its king.
1825	19 November	Alexander died of typhus. The army swore allegiance to his oldest brother, the Grand Duke Constantine Pavlovich. Constantine, however, following Alexander's choice of successor, swore allegiance to his younger brother, Nicholas I.
1825	12 December	Under pressure from Constantine, Nicholas published Alexander's succession manifesto.
1825	14 December	Decembrist revolt: Three thousand soldiers gathered at the Senate Square in Saint Petersburg, and declared their loyalty to Constantine and to the idea of a Russian constitution. When talk failed, the tsarist army dispersed the demonstrators with artillery, killing at least sixty.
1826		An imperial decree established the Second Section of His Majesty's Own Chancery, concerned with codifying and publishing the law, and the Third Section, which operated as the Empire's secret police.
1826	July	Nicholas established the office of Chief of Gendarmes, in charge of the Gendarmerie units of the Internal Guard.
1826	16 July	Russo-Persian War (1826–1828): The Persian army invaded the Russian-owned Talysh Khanate.
1828	21 February	Russo-Persian War (1826–1828) Facing the possibility of a Russian conquest of Tehran, Persia signed the Treaty of Turkmenchay.
1828	May	The Russian army occupied Wallachia.
1828	June	Russo-Turkish War (1828–1829): The Russian armed forces crossed into Dobruja, an Ottoman territory.
1829	14 September	Russo-Turkish War (1828–1829): The Treaty of Adrianople was signed, ceding the eastern shore of the Black Sea and the mouth of the Danube to the Russians.
1830	29 November	November Uprising: A group of Polish nationalists attacked Belweder Palace, the seat of the Governor-General.
1831	25 January	November Uprising: An act of the Sejm dethroned Nicholas from the Polish crown.
1831	29 January	November Uprising: A new government took office in Poland.
1831	4 February	November Uprising: Russian troops crossed the Polish border.
1831	September	Battle of Warsaw (1831): The Russian army captured Warsaw, ending the November Uprising.
1836		The Gendarmerie of the Internal Guard was spun off as the Special Corps of Gendarmes.
1852	December	The Ottoman sultan confirmed the supremacy of France and the Catholic Church over Christians in the Holy Land.
1853	3 July	Russia invaded the Ottoman provinces of Wallachia and Moldavia.
1853	4 October	Crimean War: The Ottoman Empire declared war on Russia.
1854	28 March	Crimean War: Britain and France declared war on Russia.
1854	August	Crimean War: In order to prevent the Austrian Empire entering the war, Russia evacuated Wallachia and Moldavia.
1855	18 February	Nicholas died. His son, Alexander II, became emperor.
1856	30 March	Crimean War: The Treaty of Paris was signed, officially ending the war. The Black Sea was demilitarized. Russia lost territory it had been granted at the mouth of the Danube, abandoned claims to protect Turkish Christians, and lost its influence over the Danubian Principalities.
1857		The last military settlements were disbanded.
1858	28 May	The Treaty of Aigun was signed, pushing the Russo-Chinese border east to the Amur river; Tariff Act reduces import tax.
1860	18 October	The Convention of Peking transferred the Ussuri krai from China to Russia.
1861	3 March	Emancipation reform of 1861: Alexander issued a manifesto emancipating the serfs; Student Protests against the Tsar.
1863	22 January	January Uprising: An anti-Imperial uprising began in Poland; girls allowed into secondary schools and standard curriculum set.
1864	1 January	Zemstva were established for the local self-government of Russian citizens.
1864	1 May	The Russian army began an incursion into the Khanate of Kokand.
1864	21 May	Caucasian War: Alexander declared the war over.
1864	5 August	January Uprising: Romuald Traugutt, the dictator of the rebellion, was hanged.
1864	20 November	Judicial reform of Alexander II: A royal decree introduced new laws unifying and liberalizing the Russian judiciary.
1865	17 June	The Russian army captured Tashkent
1867		The conquered territories of Central Asia became a separate Guberniya, the Russian Turkestan.
1867	30 March	Alaska Purchase: Russia agreed to the sale of Alaska to the United States of America.
1868		The Khanate of Kokand became a Russian vassal state.
1870		More vocational subjects taught to girls in schools
1873		The Narodnik rebellion began.
1873		The Emirate of Bukhara became a Russian protectorate.
1873	18 May	Khiva was captured by Russian troops.
1873	12 August	A peace treaty was signed that established the Khanate of Khiva as a quasi-independent Russian protectorate.
1876	March	The Khanate of Kokand was incorporated into the Russian Empire.
1876	20 April	April Uprising: Bulgarian nationalists attacked the Ottoman police headquarters in Oborishte.
1876	May	Alexander signed the Ems Ukaz, banning the use of the Ukrainian language in print.
1876	8 July	A secret treaty prepared for the division of the Balkans between Russia and Austria-Hungary, depending on the outcome of local revolutionary movements.
1876	6 December	Kazan demonstration: A political demonstration in front of the Kazan Cathedral in Saint Petersburg marked the appearance of the revolutionary group Land and Liberty.
1877	February	The Trial of the 193 occurred, punishing the participants of the Narodnik rebellion.
1877	24 April	Russo-Turkish War (1877–1878): Russia declared war on the Ottoman Empire.
1878	3 March	Russo-Turkish War (1877–1878): The Treaty of San Stefano was signed, concluding the war and transferring Northern Dobruja and some Caucasian territories into Russian hands. Several Slavic states, Montenegro, Serbia, Romania, and Bulgaria, received independence or autonomy.
1878	13 July	Congress of Berlin: The Treaty of Berlin, imposed on Russia by the West, divided Bulgaria into Eastern Rumelia and the Principality of Bulgaria.
1879	August	Land and Liberty split into the moderate Black Repartition and the radical terrorist group People's Will.
1880	6 August	The Special Corps of Gendarmes and the Third Section were disbanded; their functions and most capable officers were transferred to the new Department of State Police under the MVD.
1881		Constitution proposed, Alexander II agrees to it but doesn't get a chance to sign it
1881	10 March	Alexander II was assassinated by Ignacy Hryniewiecki of the People's Will. His son, Alexander III, becomes emperor.
1881	21 September	Persia officially recognized Russia's annexation of Khwarazm in the Treaty of Akhal.
1882		Alexander III introduces factory inspections and restricts working hours for women and children
	3 May	Alexander III introduced the May Laws, which expelled Russian Jews from rural areas and small towns and severely restricted their access to education
1883		Peasant Land Bank set up
1890	12 June	An imperial decree subordinated the zemstva to the authority of the appointed regional governors.
1891		Severe famine affects almost half of Russia's provinces
1892		Witte's Great Spurt increases industrial growth; women banned from mines and children under 12 banned from working in factories
1894	1 November	Alexander III dies. His son Nicholas II succeeds him as emperor.
1898	1 March	The Marxist Russian Social Democratic Labour Party (RSDLP) held its first Party Congress.
1900	16 July onward	In response to a local trade blockade, Russia invades and occupies the Sixty-Four Villages East of the Heilongjiang River. All 30,000 Qing dynasty citizens are expelled from their homes and driven across the Amur River, where most drown.
1900	6 February	As part of the Russification of Finland, Nicholas issues the Language Manifesto of 1900, making Russian the official language of Finnish administration.

== 20th century ==
Year	Date	Event
1901	30 June	Russification of Finland: The Military Service Act incorporated the Finnish and Russian armies.
1902		Russification of Finland: Nikolay Bobrikov, the Governor-General of Finland, was given the power to dismiss opponents of Russification from the Finnish government.
1902	January	The Socialist Revolutionary Party was founded.
1903	20 March	Russification of Finland: The office of the Governor-General was given dictatorial powers.
1903	6 April	Kishinev pogrom: A three-day pogrom began, which would leave forty-seven Jews dead.
1903	17 November	At the second congress of the RSDLP, the party split into two factions: the Bolsheviks, led by Vladimir Lenin, and the less radical Mensheviks.
1904	8 February	Russo-Japanese War: Japan launched a surprise torpedo attack on the Russian navy at Port Arthur.
1905	3 January	Russian Revolution of 1905: A strike began at the Putilov Works in St. Petersburg.
1905	9 January	Bloody Sunday (1905): Peaceful demonstrators arrived at the Winter Palace in Saint Petersburg to present a petition to the emperor, leading was a priest named Georgi Gapon. The Imperial Guard fired on the crowd, killing around 200 and wounding 800.
1905	27–28 May	Russo-Japanese War: The Russian Baltic Fleet was practically destroyed in the Battle of Tsushima, effectively ending the Russo-Japanese War in Japan's favour.
1905	28 May	Russian Revolution of 1905: The first soviet was formed in the midst of a textile strike in Ivanovo-Voznesensk.
1905	14 June	Russian Revolution of 1905: A mutiny occurred aboard the battleship Potemkin.
1905	25 June	Russian Revolution of 1905: The Potemkin sailors defected to Romania.
1905	5 September	Russo-Japanese War: The Treaty of Portsmouth was signed, ceding some Russian property and territory to Japan and ending the war.
1905	17 October	Russian Revolution of 1905: Nicholas signed the October Manifesto, expanding civil liberties and establishing and empowering the first State Duma of the Russian Empire.
1906	March	1906 Russian legislative election: The first free elections to the Duma gave majorities to liberal and socialist parties.
1906	23 April	The Fundamental Laws were issued, reaffirming the autocratic supremacy of the emperor.
1906	23 April	The First Duma was called.
1906	21 July	The First Duma was dissolved.
1906	23 July	The Constitutional Democratic Party (Kadets) issued the Vyborg Manifesto, calling on the Russian people to evade taxes and the draft. All signatories to the Manifesto lost their right to hold office in the Duma.
1906	9 November	A decree by Prime Minister Pyotr Stolypin signaled the start of the Stolypin reform, intended to replace the obshchina with a more progressive, capitalist form of agriculture.
1907	9 February	The secret police units of the MVD Department of State Police were unified under the authority of the new Okhrana.
1907	20 February	The Second Duma began. The Kadets dropped seats, benefiting the RSDLP and the Socialist Revolutionary Party.
1907	3 June	The Second Duma was dissolved.
1907	3 June	Nicholas changed the electoral law and gave greater electoral value to the votes of nobility and landowners.
1907	1 November	The Third Duma began.
1912	4 April	Lena massacre: The Russian army fired on a crowd of striking miners, killing 150.
1912	9 June	The Third Duma ended.
1912	15 November	The Fourth Duma was called.
1914	28 June	Assassination of Archduke Franz Ferdinand: Archduke Franz Ferdinand of Austria was assassinated by Gavrilo Princip of the Bosnian separatist group Young Bosnia.
1914	23 July	World War I: Austria-Hungary issued the July Ultimatum to Serbia, demanding, among other things, the right to participate in the investigation into the assassination of Franz Ferdinand, which Serbia refused.
1914	28 July	World War I: Austria-Hungary declared war on Serbia.
1914	30 July	World War I: Russia mobilized its army to defend Serbia.
1914	1 August	World War I: Germany declared war on Russia in defense of Austria-Hungary.
1915	2 May	Gorlice–Tarnów offensive: The German army launched an offensive across the length of the Eastern Front.
1915	4 August	Gorlice-Tarnów Offensive: Germany conquered Warsaw.
1915	19 September	Gorlice-Tarnów Offensive: German forces captured Vilnius.
1916	25 June	Basmachi Revolt: Nicholas issued a decree ordering the conscription of Central Asians.
1916	5 November	By the Act of 5th November, the German government established the nominally independent Kingdom of Poland.
1916	16 December	Royal adviser Grigori Rasputin was murdered by a group of nobles in the house of Prince Felix Yusupov.
1917	22–23 February	February Revolution: The workers at the Putilov Plant in Petrograd went on strike, demanding the end of the Russian autocracy and the end of Russian participation in World War I.
1917	25 February	February Revolution: A battalion of soldiers was sent to Petrograd to end the uprising.
1917	26 February	February Revolution: Nicholas ordered the dissolution of the Fourth Duma. The Duma ignored his order and decreed the establishment of a Provisional Government with Georgy Lvov as Prime Minister.
1917	27 February	February Revolution: The soldiers sent to suppress the protestors defected and joined them. It started off as the "National Women's day" then, after two days, the women convinced the soldiers to join their revolution due to the fact that they were women and the soldiers did not want to kill them. On top of this, the Cossacks did not try to stop the protestors. Menshevik leaders were freed from the Peter and Paul Fortress and founded the Petrograd Soviet.
1917	2 March	February Revolution: Nicholas abdicated.
1917	17 March	A legislative council, the Central Rada, was founded in Ukraine.
1917	30 March	The Provisional Government established the autonomous province of Estonia and scheduled elections to an Estonian legislative body, the Maapäev.
1917	3 April	Communist leader Vladimir Lenin returns to Petrograd after a 10-year exile from Russia and begins to rebuild his power as leader of the Bolsheviks.
1917	10 May	The Rumcherod, the Soviet government of southwestern Ukraine]and Bessarabia, was established.
1917	23 June	The Central Rada ratified Ukrainian autonomy.
1917	3 July	July Days: A spontaneous pro-soviet demonstration occurred on the streets of Petrograd.
1917	6 July	July Days: The rebellion was put down. The Provisional Government ordered the arrest of Bolshevik leaders.
1917	14 July	The Maapäev took office.
1917	21 July	Alexander Kerensky succeeded Lvov as Prime Minister.
1917	27 August	Kornilov Affair: General Lavr Kornilov ordered an army corps to Petrograd to destroy the soviets.
1917	29 August	Kornilov Affair: The Provisional Government armed tens of thousands of Red Guards to defend Petrograd.
1917	31 August	Kornilov Affair: Kornilov was arrested.
1917	4 September	Under public pressure, Bolshevik leaders were released from prison.
1917	23 October	Estonian Bolsheviks under Jaan Anvelt captured the capital, Tallinn.
1917	25 October	October Revolution: Soldiers directed by the Military Revolutionary Committee of the Petrograd Soviet captured the Winter Palace, ending the power of the Russian Provisional Government.
1917	25 October	The Second All-Russian Congress of Soviets convened. Menshevik and moderate SR representatives walked out to protest the October Revolution. The Congress established and elected the Sovnarkom, and Lenin its first chairman, to run the country between sessions.
1917	26 October	The Second All-Russian Congress of Soviets issued the Decree on Peace, promising an end to Russian participation in World War I, and the Decree on Land, approving the expropriation of land from the nobility.
1917	21 November	The Moldavian legislature, the Sfatul Țării, held its first meeting.
1917	5 December	A local nationalist group, the Alash Orda, established an autonomous government in Kazakhstan.
1917	6 December	The Finnish parliament issued a declaration of independence.
1917	7 December	The Cheka was established.
1917	12 December	A Muslim republic, the Idel-Ural State, was established in central Russia.
1917	25 December	Ukrainian Bolsheviks established the Soviet Ukrainian Republic in Kharkiv.
1917	27 December	Russian Civil War: The counterrevolutionary Volunteer Army was established.
1918	12 January	The Tsentralna Rada declared the independence of the Ukrainian People's Republic.
1918	14 January	The Rumcherod declared itself the supreme power in Bessarabia.
1918	15 January	A decree of the Sovnarkom established the Red Army.
1918	16 January	The Romanian army occupied Kishinev and evicted the Rumcherod.
1918	24 January	The Moldavian Democratic Republic declared its independence from Russia.
1918	28 January	The Transcaucasian parliament held its first meeting.
1918	18 February	The Red Army conquered Kiev.
1918	23 February	Mass conscription to the Red Army began in Moscow and Petrograd.
1918	24 February	The Red Army retreated from Estonia in the face of the German armed forces.
1918	3 March	Soviet Russia signed the Treaty of Brest-Litovsk, ending its participation in World War I, relinquishing Finland, Estonia, Latvia, Lithuania, Poland, Belarus, and Ukraine, and ceding to the Ottoman Empire all territory captured in the Russo-Turkish War.
1918	6 March	Allied intervention in the Russian Civil War: Two hundred British marines arrived at Murmansk.
1918	25 March	The Belarusian Democratic Republic was established by the Second Constituent Charter.
1918	April	The Idel-Ural State was occupied and dissolved by the Red Army.
1918	30 April	The Turkestan Autonomous Soviet Socialist Republic (ASSR) was established on the territory of the defunct Russian Turkestan.
1918	26 May	Russian Civil War: The Czecho-Slovak Legions began its revolt against the Bolshevik government.
1918	28 May	Armenia and Azerbaijan declared their mutual independence.
1918	8 June	Russian Civil War: An anti-Bolshevik government, the Committee of Members of the Constituent Assembly, was established in Samara under the protection of the Czecho-Slovak Legions
1918	28 June	A decree by the Central Executive Committee made war communism, under which all industry and food distribution was nationalized, the economic policy of the Soviet state.
1918	29 June	Russian Civil War: The Provisional Government of Autonomous Siberia was established in Vladivostok.
1918	July	The Idel-Ural State was restored by the Czecho-Slovak Legions.
1918	July	Nestor Makhno declared his opposition to the Hetmanate regime by some operations in the southeastern Ukraine.
1918	10 July	The Russian Constitution of 1918 was adopted by the Fifth All-Russian Congress of Soviets. The legislative power was transferred from the Sovnarkom to the Central Executive Committee, which also received the power to pass constitutional amendments.
1918	17 July	Nicholas and the rest of the royal family were executed.
1918	30 August	After giving a speech at a Moscow factory, Lenin was shot twice by SR Fanny Kaplan, but survived.
1918	3 September	Red Terror: Izvestia called on the Russian people to "crush the hydra of counterrevolution with massive terror."
1918	23 September	Russian Civil War: A meeting in Ufa established a unified anti-Bolshevik government, the Ufa Directory.
1918	November	Makhnovists established an anarchist society run by peasants and workers in Ukraine, in the territory of Berdiansk, Donetsk, Oleksandrivsk and Katerynoslav.
1918	11 November	World War I: An armistice treaty was signed, ending the war.
1918	17 November	Two Latvian political parties founded a provisional legislature, the People's Council of Latvia.
1918	18 November	A military coup overthrew the Ufa Directorate and established its war minister, Aleksandr Kolchak, as dictator.
1918	19 November	The Maapäev returned to power in Estonia.
1918	22 November	Estonian War of Independence: The Russian Red Army invaded Estonia.
1918	24 November	Béla Kun, a friend of Lenin, founded the Hungarian Communist Party.
1918	29 November	Estonian War of Independence: The Red Army captured the Estonian town of Narva. Local Bolsheviks reestablished the Anvelt government as the Commune of the Working People of Estonia.
1918	December	The Idel-Ural State was again occupied and dissolved by the Red Army.
1918	8 December	The Communist Party of Lithuania established a revolutionary government in Vilnius.
1919	1 January	Local Bolsheviks established the Byelorussian Soviet Socialist Republic (SSR).
1919	3 January	Latvian War of Independence: The Red Army invaded Latvia.
1919	5 January	The Red Army occupied Vilnius, the Lithuanian capital, in support of the local Communist government.
1919	5 January	The Red Army captured Minsk and pronounced it the capital of the Byelorussian SSR.
1919	16 January	The Orgburo was established to oversee the membership and organization of the Communist Party.
1919	14 February	Polish–Soviet War: The Polish army attacked Soviet forces occupying the town of Biaroza.
1919	27 February	Lithuania was absorbed into the Lithuanian-Byelorussian Soviet Socialist Republic.
1919	4 March	The First Congress of the Comintern began in Moscow.
1919	4 March	The White Army launches a Spring Offensive against the Red Army.
1919	21 March	Seeking a military alliance with Russia against the French, the Hungarian Social Democrats merged with the Communist Party, released Kun from prison and appointed him Commissar for Foreign Affairs. Kun dismissed the president and proclaimed the Hungarian Soviet Republic.
1919	25 March	The Eighth Party Congress reinstituted the Politburo as the central governing body of the Communist Party.
1919	16 April	The Romanian army invaded Hungary.
1919	21 April	Polish–Soviet War: The Polish army consolidated its control of Vilnius.
1919	28 April	The Red Army counteroffensive in the Eastern front begins.
1919	29 April	The White Army Spring offensive ends.
1919	30 May	An anti-communist Hungarian government headed by Gyula Károlyi was established in Szeged.
1919	16 June	Hungarian occupiers established the Slovak Soviet Republic.
1919	July	The Red Army Counteroffensive ends.
1919	7 July	The Czechoslovak Army reoccupied its territory and dissolved the Slovak Soviet Republic.
1919	July	Red Army detachments numbering some 40,000 troops in Crimea mutinied and deposed their commanders; many set out to join the Revolutionary Insurgent Army of Ukraine.
1919	1 August	Threatened by the approach of the Romanian army, Kun fled to Austria.
1919	14 August	The Romanian army left the Hungarian capital, Budapest. Admiral Miklós Horthy stepped into the power vacuum with the army of the Károlyi government.
1919	25 August	Polish–Soviet War: After its total occupation by Polish forces, the Lithuanian-Byelorussian SSR was dissolved.
1919	14 November	Great Siberian Ice March:Admiral Kolchak's Army starts retreating from Omsk to Chita
1920	2 February	Estonian War of Independence: Soviet Russia signed the Treaty of Tartu, renouncing all claims on Estonian territory.
1920	2 February	An insurgency in the Khanate of Khiva forced the abdication of the Khan.
1920	7 February	Russian Civil War: Kolchak was executed by a Bolshevik military tribunal.
1920	February	The Makhnovshchina was inundated with Red Army troops, including the 42nd Rifle Division and the Latvian & Estonian Red Division – in total at least 20,000 soldiers. The Makhnovists disarmed the 10,000-strong Estonian Division in Huliaipole.
1920	26 March	Russian Civil War: The Volunteer Army evacuated to the Crimea to join the army of Pyotr Nikolayevich Wrangel.
1920	25 April	The Russian Eleventh Army invaded the Azerbaijan Democratic Republic.
1920	26 April	The Khorezm People's Soviet Republic was established on the territory of the defunct Khanate of Khiva.
1920	28 April	With the Azerbaijani capital Baku under Eleventh Army occupation, the parliament agreed to transfer power to the communist government of the Azerbaijan SSR.
1920	12 June	Soviet Russia recognized Lithuanian independence.
1920	8 July	Polish–Soviet War: The Galician Soviet Socialist Republic (SSR) was established in Ternopil.
1920	11 August	Latvian War of Independence: The Treaty of Riga was signed. Soviet Russia renounced all claims on Latvian territory.
1920	13 August	Battle of Warsaw: The battle began with a Bolsheviks' attack across the Vistula.
1920	26 August	The Bolsheviks defeated the government of the Alash Orda and established the Kyrgyz ASSR (1920–1925)
1920	31 August	Battle of Warsaw: The total defeat of the Russian Fourth, Fifteenth and Sixteenth Armies marked the end of the battle.
1920	2 September	The Red Army attacked Bukhara, the capital of the Emirate of Bukhara.
1920	21 September	Polish–Soviet War: The Polish army occupied Galicia and ended the rule of the Galician SSR.
1920	25 September	The Revolutionary Insurgent Army of Ukraine suddenly turned from south to east, attacking the main forces of General Denikin's army.
1920	26 September	The Revolutionary Insurgent Army of Ukraine routed elements of the white Volunteer Army in the Battle of Peregonovka, Uman (Ukraine).
1920	8 October	The Bukharan People's Soviet Republic was established.
1920	14 November	Russian Civil War: Pyotr Wrangel fled Russia.
1920	29 November	The Eleventh Army entered Armenia.
1920	1 December	The Armenian Prime Minister ceded control of the country to the invading communists.
1921	16 February	Red Army invasion of Georgia: The Eleventh Army crossed into Georgia.
1921	22 February	Gosplan, the economic planning committee of the Soviet Union, was created by a decree of the Sovnarkom.
1921	25 February	Red Army invasion of Georgia: The Eleventh Army captured Tbilisi and announced the formation of the Georgian SSR.
1921	28 February	Kronstadt rebellion: The crews of the battleships Petropavlovsk and Sevastopol, harbored at Kronstadt, published a list of demands on the government.
1921	16 March	Treaty of Moscow is signed between Grand National Assembly of Turkey and Russian SFSR.
1921	17 March	Kronstadt rebellion: After over a week of fighting, government troops pacified Kronstadt.
1921	21 March	A decree of the Tenth Party Congress replaced war communism with the more liberal New Economic Policy.
1921	18 March	Polish–Soviet War: Poland and Soviet Russia signed the Peace of Riga, ending the war. The disputed territories were divided between Poland, Russia and the newly reestablished Ukrainian and Byelorussian SSRs.
1921	July	The Red Army captured Ulaanbaatar, the Mongolian capital.
1921	13 July	Russian famine of 1921: The writer Maxim Gorky brought world attention to the looming famine.
1921	August	Nestor Makhno's headquarters staff and several subordinate commanders were arrested and executed on the spot by a Red Army firing squad: the Makhnovist treaty delegation, still in Kharkiv, was also arrested and liquidated. Makhnovist forces were defeated and dispersed by Red Army.
1921	6 November	East Karelian Uprising begins between Finnish and Karelian forces.
1922	23 February	Russian famine of 1921: A decree published in Izvestia authorized the seizure of church valuables for famine relief.
1922	12 March	The Georgian, Armenian and Azerbaijani SSRs were merged into the Transcaucasian Soviet Federative Socialist Republic (SFSR).
1922	21 March	East Karelian Uprising ends between Finnish and Karelian forces.
1922	3 April	The Eleventh Communist Party Congress established the office of the General Secretary of the Communist Party and appointed Joseph Stalin to fill it.
1922	16 May	Tikhon, the Patriarch of Moscow, was put under house arrest.
1922	4 August	Basmachi Revolt: Enver Pasha was killed in Turkestan.
1922	29 December	The Treaty on the Creation of the USSR united its signatories, the Russian and Transcaucasian SFSRs and the Byelorussian and Ukrainian SSRs, under the power of the Union of Soviet Socialist Republics.
1923	3 May	A council of the pro-government Living Church declared Tikhon an apostate and abolished the Patriarchate.
1923	16 June	Russian Civil War officially ends.
1923	15 October	The Declaration of 46 was written. The Declaration echoed earlier concerns expressed by Leon Trotsky, the Chairman of the Revolutionary Military Council, that the Communist Party was insufficiently democratic.
1924	21 January	Lenin died.
1924	31 January	The 1924 Soviet Constitution came into effect.
1924	18 February	The Thirteenth Party Congress, led by Stalin, Comintern chairman Grigory Zinoviev and Politburo chairman Lev Kamenev, denounced Trotsky and his faction, the Left Opposition.
1924	10 October	The territory of the Khorezm SSR was incorporated into the Turkestan ASSR.
1924	12 October	The Moldavian ASSR was established in the Ukrainian SSR.
1924	14 October	The Kara-Kyrgyz Autonomous Oblast was spun off of the Turkestan ASSR and incorporated into the Russian SFSR.
1924	27 October	The Uzbek SSR was spun out of the Turkestan ASSR.
1924	25 November	The Mongolian People's Republic was established.
1924	27 November	The Bukharan People's Soviet Republic was incorporated into the Uzbek SSR.
1925	6 January	Trotsky was forced to resign his military offices.
1925	19 February	The lands of the Karakalpaks became the Karakalpak Autonomous Oblast, an oblast of the Kyrgyz ASSR (1920–1925).
1925	7 April	Tikhon died. The Communist government would not allow elections to the patriarchate to be held; Metropolitan Peter of Krutitsy became the Patriarchal locum tenens according to his will.
1925	19 April	The Kyrgyz ASSR (1920–1925) was renamed the Kazakh ASSR.
1925	13 May	The Uzbek SSR joined the Soviet Union.
1925	13 May	The remainder of the Turkestan ASSR became the Turkmen SSR.
1925	10 December	Peter of Krutitsy was arrested. Sergius of Nizhny Novgorod, whom he had named to succeed him, took the title of Deputy Patriarchal locum tenens.
1925	23 December	The Fourteenth Party Congress endorsed the leadership of Stalin and his rightist ally Nikolai Bukharin, soundly defeating the New Opposition faction of Kamenev and Zinoviev.
1926	11 February	The Kara-Kyrgyz Autonomous Oblast was reorganized into the Kyrgyz ASSR (1926–1936).
1926	23 October	Trotsky was expelled from the Politburo.
1927	25 February	Article 58 of the RFSR Penal Code revised the penalties for counterrevolutionary activity.
1927	29 July	Sergius affirmed the loyalty of the Russian Orthodox Church to the Soviet government.
1927	12 November	Trotsky and Zinoviev were expelled from the Communist Party.
1927	2 December	The Fifteenth Party Congress expelled the remainder of the United Opposition from the Party.
1928	7 March	Shakhty Trial: Police arrested a group of engineers in the town of Shakhty and accused them of conspiring to sabotage the Soviet economy.
1928	1 October	First five-year plan: Stalin announced the beginning of state industrialisation of the Soviet economy.
1929	17 November	Bukharin was expelled from the Politburo.
1929	17 November	Collectivisation in the USSR: A Central Committee resolution began the collectivisation of Soviet agriculture.
1929	5 December	The Tajik ASSR of the Uzbek SSR became the Tajik SSR.
1930	15 April	The Gulag was officially established.
1930	20 July	The Karakalpak Autonomous Oblast was transferred to the Russian SFSR.
1932	20 March	The Karakalpak Autonomous Oblast became the Karakalpak ASSR.
1932	7 August	Collectivisation in the USSR: The Central Executive Committee and the Sovnarkom issued the Decree about the Protection of Socialist Property, under which any theft of public property was punishable by death.
1932	11 September	Holodomor: Stalin sent a letter to a Politburo ally, Lazar Kaganovich, demanding the subjection of the Ukrainian SSR.
1932	27 December	A decree by the Central Executive Committee and the Sovnarkom established a passport system in the Soviet Union.
1932	31 December	First Five-Year Plan: It was announced that the plan had been fulfilled.
1933	22 January	Holodomor: Police were instructed to prevent Ukrainian peasants from leaving their homes in search of food.
1934	8 February	Elections to the Central Committee at the Seventeenth Party Congress revealed Sergey Kirov, the chief of the Leningrad Party, to be the most popular member.
1934	10 July	The Main Directorate of State Security (GUGB) was established under the NKVD as a successor to the OGPU.
1934	1 December	Kirov was murdered by Leonid Nikolaev, possibly at the behest of Stalin.
1935	31 August	Aleksei Grigorievich Stakhanov was reported to have mined over one hundred tons of coal in a single shift, sowing the seeds of the Stakhanovite movement.
1936	19 August	Moscow Trials: The Trial of the Sixteen, in which Kamenev and Zinoviev were the primary defendants, began.
1936	25 August	Moscow Trials: The defendants in the Trial of the Sixteen were executed.
1936	5 December	The Stalin Constitution came into effect. The Central Executive Committee was renamed the Supreme Soviet of the Soviet Union.
1936	5 December	The Kyrgyz ASSR (1926–1936) became a Union-level republic, the Kyrgyz SSR.
1936	5 December	The Kazakh ASSR became the Kazakh SSR.
1936	5 December	The territory of the Karakalpak ASSR was incorporated into the Uzbek SSR.
1937	23 January	Moscow Trials: The Second Trial began.
1937	30 January	Moscow Trials: The Second Trial ended. Of seventeen defendants, all but four were sentenced to death.
1937	22 May	Case of Trotskyist Anti-Soviet Military Organization: Mikhail Tukhachevsky, a Marshal of the Soviet Union and hero of the Russian Civil War, was arrested.
1937	12 June	Case of Trotskyist Anti-Soviet Military Organization: Tukhachevsky was executed, with eight other military leaders.
1937	30 July	Great Purge: NKVD Order No. 00447 was issued. The order established a new judicial method, the NKVD troika, and set nationwide quotas for the execution and enslavement of "anti-Soviet elements."
1937	11 August	Polish operation of the NKVD: The NKVD chief signed Order No. 00485, classifying all potential Polish nationalists as enemies of the state.
1937	15 August	Great Purge: NKVD Order No. 00486 made relatives of accused traitors subject to imprisonment in labor camps.
1937	10 October	Peter of Krutitsy was executed in solitary confinement.
1938		A new decree required the teaching of Russian in all non-Russian schools.
1938	2 March	Trial of the Twenty One: The third Moscow Trial, at which Bukharin was the primary defendant, began.
1938	15 March	Trial of the Twenty One: The defendants were executed.
1938	29 July	Battle of Lake Khasan: The armed forces of Japanese Manchukuo attacked the Soviet military at Lake Khasan.
1938	31 August	Battle of Lake Khasan: The battle ended in a Japanese defeat.
1939	23 August	The Molotov–Ribbentrop Pact was signed, promising mutual non-aggression between Germany and the Soviet Union and agreeing to a division of much of Europe between those two countries.
1939	17 September	Soviet invasion of Poland: The Red Army invaded Poland.
1939	22 October	Elections were held to the Supreme Soviets of the Polish areas annexed by the Soviet Union.
1939	26 November	Shelling of Mainila: The Red Army shelled the Russian village of Mainila and blamed the Finns for invented casualties.
1939	30 November	Winter War: The Soviet army attacked Finland.
1939	1 December	Winter War: The Soviet Union established the Finnish Democratic Republic in the border town of Terijoki.
1940	29 January	Winter War: The Soviet Union recognized the Finnish government as the legitimate government of Finland, thereby abandoning the Finnish Democratic Republic, and informed the Finnish government that the Soviets were willing to negotiate peace.
1940	5 March	Katyn massacre: The Politburo signed an order to execute 27,500 imprisoned Polish nationals.
1940	12 March	Winter War: The Moscow Peace Treaty was signed, ending the war. Finland ceded 9% of its territory to the Soviet Union, leading to the evacuation of Finnish Karelia. The Soviet attempt to conquer Finland failed.
1940	31 March	The Karelian ASSR merged with the Finnish Democratic Republic into the Karelo-Finnish SSR.
1940	15 June	The Red Army occupied Lithuania.
1940	17 June	The Red Army occupied Estonia and Latvia.
1940	28 June	Soviet occupation of Bessarabia: Bessarabia and northern Bukovina were occupied by the Soviet Union.
1940	21 July	Lithuania became the Lithuanian SSR; Latvia became the Latvian SSR.
1940	2 August	The Moldavian ASSR became the Moldavian SSR, with much of its territory on the former Bessarabia and Bukovina. The old territory of the Moldavian ASSR remained in the Ukrainian SSR.
1940	3 August	The Lithuanian SSR was accepted into the Soviet Union.
1940	5 August	The Latvian SSR was annexed by the Soviet Union.
1940	6 August	Estonia became the Estonian SSR and was incorporated into the Soviet Union.
1940	21 August	Trotsky is assassinated by Ramón Mercader on Stalin's orders.
1941	13 April	Soviet–Japanese border conflicts: A Soviet–Japanese Neutrality Pact was signed.
1941	22 June	Operation Barbarossa: Three million Axis soldiers invaded the Soviet Union.
1941	25 June	Continuation War: The Soviet Union launched a major air offensive against Finnish targets.
1941	28 June	Operation Barbarossa: The Germans captured Minsk.
1941	27 July	Operation Barbarossa: The German and Romanian armies entered Kishinev.
1941	21 August	Anglo-Soviet invasion of Iran: Three Soviet armies invaded Iran from the north.
1941	8 September	Siege of Leningrad: The Germans army cut the last land tie to Leningrad.
1941	19 September	Operation Barbarossa: Kiev fell to the Germans.
1941	2 October	Battle of Moscow: Three German armies began an advance on Moscow.
1941	20 November	Siege of Leningrad: The first food was carried into Leningrad across the Road of Life on the frozen Lake Ladoga.
1941	5 December	Battle of Moscow: The Soviet army launched a counterattack from Kalinin.
1942	7 January	Battle of Moscow: The Soviet counteroffensive ended between sixty and one-hundred fifty miles from Moscow.
1942	21 August	Battle of Stalingrad: The German Luftwaffe began a bombing raid against Stalingrad.
1942	19 November	Operation Uranus: The Soviet army began a pincer movement against the German forces besieging Stalingrad.
1942	22 November	Operation Uranus: The German Sixth Army was surrounded.
1943	12 January	Operation Spark (1943): The Soviet army launched a military offensive to break the Siege of Leningrad.
1943	18 January	Operation Spark (1943): The meeting of the Leningrad and Volkhov Front units opened a land corridor to Leningrad.
1943	2 February	Battle of Stalingrad: The German Sixth Army surrendered.
1943	15 May	The Comintern was dissolved.
1943	8 September	Stalin allowed a church council, which unanimously elected Sergius to the Patriarchate of Moscow.
1943	6 November	The Russians recaptured Kiev.
1944	6 January	The Red Army crossed into Poland.
1944	27 January	Siege of Leningrad: The last German forces were expelled from the city.
1944	15 May	Patriarch Sergius died.
1944	31 August	Soviet occupation of Romania: The Red Army captured Bucharest.
1944	12 September	Romania signed an armistice with the Allies, placing itself under the command of an Allied Commission led by Marshal of the Soviet Union Rodion Malinovsky.
1944	19 September	Continuation War: The Moscow Armistice was signed, ending the war at roughly the prewar borders.
1944	21 September	Soviet and Czechoslovak partisan armed forces entered German-occupied Czechoslovakia.
1944	14 November	The Committee for the Liberation of the Peoples of Russia was established in Prague.
1945	17 January	The Soviet Union captured Warsaw.
1945	18 January	The Soviet Union captured Budapest.
1945	2 February	Alexius I was elected Patriarch of Moscow.
1945	11 February	The Soviet Union gained the right to Sakhalin and the Kuril Islands at the Yalta Conference
1945	20 April	Battle of Berlin: The Soviet army began shelling Berlin.
1945	2 May	Battle of Berlin: The defenders of Berlin surrendered to the Soviet Union.
1945	9 May	The Soviet army captured Prague.
1945	18 June	Trial of the Sixteen: Leaders of the Polish Secret State were tried in the Soviet Union for collaboration.
1945	21 June	Trial of the Sixteen: The defendants were sentenced.
1945	16 August	Invasion of Manchuria: Soviet armed forces landed on Sakhalin.
1945	18 August	Invasion of Manchuria: Soviet amphibious forces landed in Korea.
1945	20 August	Invasion of Manchuria: The Soviet Union captured Changchun, the capital of Manchukuo.
1945	November	The Soviet Union established the Azerbaijan People's Government in Iranian Azerbaijan.
1946	22 January	The Soviet-backed Kurdish Republic of Mahabad declared its independence from Iran.
1946	2 March	Iran crisis: British troops withdrew from Iran. The Soviet Union violated its prior agreement and remained.
1946	10 March	The Ukrainian Greek Catholic Church was liquidated by a rump synod in Lviv and driven underground.
1946	9 May	Iran crisis: The Soviet Union withdrew from Iran.
1947	5 October	The Cominform was established in order to coordinate Communist parties under Soviet control.
1948	24 June	Berlin Blockade: The Soviet Union blocked rail and road access to West Berlin.
1948	25 June	Berlin Blockade: The commander of the American occupation zone ordered an airlift of supplies into West Berlin.
1948	28 June	Yugoslavia was expelled from the Cominform.
1948	9 September	The Democratic People's Republic of Korea was established.
1949	11 May	Berlin Blockade: The Soviets lifted the blockade.
1949	29 August	Joe 1: The Soviet atomic bomb project culminated in a successful test detonation.
1949	1 October	Chinese Civil War: Mao Zedong proclaims the establishment of the People's Republic of China, with the Soviet Union recognized it the next day.
1950	30 January	Korean War: Regarding a mass invasion of the South, Stalin wrote to his ambassador to North Korea: "Tell him [Kim] that I am ready to help him in this matter."
1950	25 June	Korean War: The North Korean army launched a 135,000-man surprise assault across the 38th parallel.
1950	1 November	Korean War: Soviet-piloted MiG-15s first crossed the Yalu River and attacked American planes.
1952	20 November	Prague Trials: A series of show trials purged the Communist Party of Czechoslovakia of Jews and insufficiently orthodox Stalinists.
1953	13 January	An article in Pravda accused some of the nation's most prominent doctors – particularly Jews – of participating in a vast conspiracy to poison top Soviet leaders.
1953	1 March	After an all-night dinner with party members Lavrenty Beria, Nikolai Bulganin, Nikita Khrushchev and Georgy Malenkov, Stalin suffered a paralyzing stroke.
1953	5 March	Stalin died.
1953	6 March	Malenkov succeeded Stalin as Premier and First Secretary of the Communist Party.
1953	14 March	Khrushchev became First Secretary.
1953	3 April	The Presidium of the Central Committee of the Communist Party officially acquitted those arrested in connection with the so-called "doctors' plot".
1953	16 June	Uprising of 1953 in East Germany: In response to a 10 percent increase in work quotas, between 60 and 80 construction workers went on strike in East Berlin. Their numbers quickly swelled and a general strike and protests were called for the next day.
1953	17 June	Uprising of 1953 in East Germany: 100,000 protestors gathered at dawn, demanding the reinstatement of old work quotas and, later, the resignation of the East German government. At noon German police trapped many of the demonstrators in an open square; Soviet tanks fired on the crowd, killing hundreds and ending the protest.
1953	26 June	Beria was arrested at a special meeting of the Presidium.
1953	27 July	Korean War: An armistice was signed, ending the conflict.
1953	7 September	Khrushchev was confirmed as head of the Central Committee.
1954	16 May	Kengir Uprising: Prisoners at a Gulag adjacent to the Kazakh village of Kengir occupied the camp's service yard.
1954	25 June	Kengir Uprising: The prison camp at Kengir was invaded and subdued by Soviet troops and tanks.
1955	2 June	Khrushchev and Tito issued the Belgrade declaration, which declared that "different forms of Socialist development are solely the concern of the individual countries."
1956	25 February	At a closed session of the 20th Party Congress, Khrushchev read the "Secret Speech," On the Personality Cult and its Consequences, denouncing the actions of his predecessor Stalin. The speech weakened the hand of the Stalinists in the Soviet government.
1956	17 April	The Cominform was officially dissolved.
1956	28 June	Poznań 1956 protests: Poles upset with the slow pace of destalinization turned to protests, and then to violent riots.
1956	29 June	Poznań 1956 protests: Konstantin Rokossovsky, the Polish minister of defense, ordered the military in to end the riots. At least 74 civilians were killed.
1956	16 July	The Karelo-Finnish SSR became the Karelian ASSR of the Russian SFSR.
1956	19 October	The liberal Władysław Gomułka was elected leader of the Polish Communist party.
1956	23 October	1956 Hungarian Revolution: A small pro-Gomułka demonstration in Budapest expanded into a 100,000 head protest. The protestors marched on Parliament; when they were fired on by the Hungarian Security Police, they turned violent and began to arm themselves. An emergency meeting of the Central Committee appointed the reformist Imre Nagy Prime Minister.
1956	31 October	1956 Hungarian Revolution: Hungary under Nagy withdrew from the Warsaw Pact.
1956	4 November	1956 Hungarian Revolution: A Soviet invasion, involving infantry, artillery, airstrikes, and some 6,000 tanks entered Budapest. 2,500 Hungarians were killed in the ensuing battle.
1956	8 November	1956 Hungarian Revolution: Pro-Soviet János Kádár announced the formation of a new "Revolutionary Worker-Peasant Government," with himself as Prime Minister and leader of the Communist Party.
1957	18 June	Led by the Stalinist Anti-Party Group, the Presidium voted to depose Khrushchev as First Secretary. The Presidium reversed its vote under pressure from Khrushchev and the defense minister and deferred the decision to a later meeting of the full Central Committee.
1957	29 June	A Central Committee vote affirmed Khrushchev as First Secretary and deposed Anti-Party Group members Molotov, Kaganovich, and Malenkov from the Secretariat of the CPSU Central Committee.
1957	4 October	Sputnik was launched at 7:28 pm
1958	27 March	Khrushchev replaced Bulganin as Premier of the Soviet Union.
1959	1 January	Cuban Revolution: Revolutionaries led by Fidel Castro overthrow Fulgencio Batista.
1960	16 April	Sino-Soviet Split: The Chinese Communist Party accused the Soviet leadership of "revisionism."
1960	16 July	Sino-Soviet Split: Moscow recalled thousands of Soviet advisers from China and ended economic and military aid.
1961	12 April	Yuri Gagarin becomes the first human to travel into outer space.
1961	13 August	Construction began on the Berlin Wall.
1962	2 June	Novocherkassk massacre: Soviet workers gathered in the town square of Novocherkassk to protest an increase in food prices and work quotas. Shots were fired at the rioters, killing 25 and injuring 87 people.
1962	16 October	Cuban Missile Crisis: President Kennedy is shown aerial photos from U-2 surveillance flights showing missile bases in Cuba. The thirteen days marking the most dangerous period of the Cuban Missile Crisis begin.
1962	22 October	Cuban Missile Crisis: Kennedy announced that any nuclear missile attack from Cuba would be regarded as an attack by the Soviet Union, and that the island would be placed under "quarantine" to prevent further weapons shipments.
1962	26 October	Cuban Missile Crisis: The Soviet Union offered to withdraw the missiles in return for a U.S. guarantee not to invade Cuba or support any invasion.
1962	28 October	Cuban Missile Crisis: Khrushchev announced that he had ordered the removal of the Soviet missiles in Cuba.
1964	14 October	Khrushchev's rivals in the party deposed him at a Central Committee meeting. Leonid Brezhnev and Alexei Kosygin assumed power as First Secretary and Premier, respectively.
1967	7 February	Sino-Soviet split: The Chinese government announced that it could no longer guarantee the safety of Soviet diplomats outside the embassy building.
1967	10 June	The Soviet Union severed diplomatic relations with Israel. see Soviet Union and the Arab-Israeli conflict
1968	5 January	Prague Spring: The liberal Alexander Dubček was appointed to succeed Antonín Novotný as First Secretary of the Communist Party of Czechoslovakia.
1968	5 April	Prague Spring: The Communist Party of Czechoslovakia published their Action Programme. This document guaranteed a number of new freedoms including free speech, travel, debate and association.
1968	20 August	Prague Spring: Between 200,000 and 600,000 Warsaw Pact troops crossed the Czechoslovak border.
1968	21 August	Prague Spring: Leading KSČ liberals – including Dubček – were arrested, flown to Moscow and forced to repeal the reforms of the Prague Spring. They agreed to the presence of Soviet troops in Czechoslovakia.
1969	2 March	Sino-Soviet border conflict: A Soviet patrol came into armed conflict with Chinese forces on Zhenbao Island.
1973	27 January	Vietnam War: The Paris Peace Accords pledged the signatory parties to "respect the independence, sovereignty, unity, and territorial integrity of Vietnam as recognized by the 1954 Geneva Agreements on Vietnam," and promised a complete withdrawal of United States forces from Vietnam and Laos.
1975	30 April	Vietnam War: People's Army of Vietnam overrun and capitulate the city of Saigon, capital of South Vietnam.
1977	7 October	Brezhnev Constitution adopted. The Communist Party was proclaimed "the leading and guiding force of the Soviet society".
1978	28 April	Saur Revolution: Military units loyal to the PDPA assaulted the Afghan Presidential palace, killing President Mohammed Daoud Khan.
1978	1 May	Saur Revolution: The PDPA installed its leader, Nur Muhammad Taraki, as President of Afghanistan.
1978	July	A rebellion against the new Afghan government began with an uprising in Nuristan.
1978	5 December	A treaty was signed that permitted deployment of the Soviet military at the Afghan government's request.
1979	14 September	Taraki was murdered by supporters of Prime Minister Hafizullah Amin.
1979	24 December	Soviet–Afghan War: Fearing the collapse of the Amin regime, the Soviet army invaded Afghanistan.
1979	27 December	Operation Storm-333: Soviet troops occupied major governmental, military and media buildings in Kabul, including the Tajbeg Presidential Palace, and executed Prime Minister Amin.
1980	22 January	Andrei Sakharov is exiled without charges to the closed industrial city of Gorky for opposing the invasion of Afghanistan.
1980	6 February	The United States announces its planned boycott of the Moscow Olympics because of the invasion of Afghanistan.
1980	19 July – 3 August	1980 Summer Olympic Games in Moscow.
1982	25 January	Suslov died after a severe stroke.
1982	10 November	Brezhnev died of a heart attack.
1982	12 November	Yuri Andropov was elected General Secretary of the CPSU.
1983	1 September	South Korean Boeing 747 was shot down by the Soviet Air Forces
1984	9 February	Andropov died after a lengthy kidney disease and was succeeded as General Secretary by Konstantin Chernenko.
1984	8 May	Chernenko announces a Soviet-bloc boycott of the Los Angeles-held Summer Olympics, citing security concerns for its athletes.
1985	10 March	Chernenko died of emphysema.
1985	11 March	The Politburo unanimously supported Mikhail Gorbachev as General Secretary of the Communist Party.
1985	7 May	Gorbachev launches an anti-alcohol campaign by decree of the Council of Ministers "On measures to overcome alcoholism".
1988	14 April	Soviet–Afghan War: The Soviet government signed the Geneva Accords, which included a timetable for withdrawing their armed forces.
1988	13 April	Singing Revolution: The Popular Front of Estonia was founded.
1988	3 June	Singing Revolution: The liberalization movement Sąjūdis was founded in Lithuania.
1988	9 October	Singing Revolution: The Popular Front of Latvia was founded.
1988	15 November	Soviet Union and the Arab-Israeli conflict: The Soviet Union recognizes the independence of the State of Palestine declared by the Palestine Liberation Organization.
1988	7 December	An earthquake destroyed the city of Spitak in northern Armenia.
1989	15 February	Soviet–Afghan War: The last Soviet troops left the country.
1989	23 August	Singing Revolution: Two million people joined hands to form the Baltic Way across Estonia, Latvia and Lithuania to demonstrate for independence.
1989	9 November	The East German government loosened restrictions on travel into the West, effecting the end of the Berlin Wall.
1989	28 November	Velvet Revolution: The Communist Party of Czechoslovakia announced the end of its monopoly on political power.
1989	1 December	Mikhail Gorbachev meets with Pope John Paul II at the Vatican.
1989	7 December	Singing Revolution: The Lithuanian parliament ended the political monopoly of the Communist Party of Lithuania.
1989	25 December	Romanian Revolution of 1989: Romanian dictator Nicolae Ceauşescu and his wife, Elena, were captured in the countryside and executed.
1990	11 March	Singing Revolution: The Lithuanian government declared its independence from the Soviet Union.
1990	18 March	Singing Revolution: Elections to the Latvian Supreme Soviet gave the majority of seats to a pro-independence coalition, led by the Popular Front of Latvia.
1990	12 June	The First Congress of People's Deputies of Russia issued the Declaration of State Sovereignty of the Russian Soviet Federative Socialist Republic.
1990	21 August	Gagauzia conflict: The Gagauz declared a new soviet republic on Moldavian soil.
1991	11 January	January Events: Soviet troops violently seized important buildings in cities throughout Lithuania.
1991	17 March	A referendum on the future of the Soviet Union was held, with nearly 70% of voters supporting the renewed New Union Treaty.
1991	12 June	1991 Russian presidential election: Boris Yeltsin was elected to the presidency of the Russian SFSR.
1991	19 August	Soviet coup attempt of 1991: A group of high-ranking officials calling themselves the State Emergency Committee announced that Gennady Yanayev was to replace Gorbachev as President of the Soviet Union.
1991	20 August	The Estonian government declared its independence.
1991	21 August	The government of Latvia declared its independence.
1991	21 August	Soviet coup attempt of 1991: The military refused State Emergency Committee orders to take the capital. The leaders of the coup were arrested.
1991	24 August	The Ukrainian parliament adopted the Declaration of Independence of Ukraine.
1991	27 August	Moldova declared independence.
1991	31 August	The Republic of Kyrgyzstan declared independence.
1991	6 September	The Soviet Union recognized the independence of the Baltic states.
1991	6 September	Militants belonging to the separatist All-National Congress of the Chechen People (NCChP) stormed a session of the Supreme Soviet of the Chechen-Ingush ASSR. NCChP leader Dzhokhar Dudayev was appointed to the presidency.
1991	18 October	Soviet Union and the Arab-Israeli conflict: The Soviet Union restores full relations with Israel.
1991	27 October	A national referendum confirmed Dudayev's presidency. Dudayev unilaterally declared the independence of the Chechen Republic of Ichkeria.
1991	8 December	The leaders of Russia, Belarus and Ukraine signed the Belavezha Accords, dissolving the Soviet Union.
1991	26 December	The Supreme Soviet confirmed the dissolution of the Soviet Union.
1992	2 January	Centralized price controls have been canceled. "Liberalization of prices" started.
1992	31 March	Treaty of Federation signed by the representatives of the Russian federal government and regional authorities.
1992	1 October	Voucher privatization begins.
1992	31 Oct–4 Nov	Ossetian–Ingush Conflict over the eastern parts of the autonomous republic of North Ossetia
1993	21 September	1993 Russian constitutional crisis: Yeltsin announced the dissolution of the Russian legislature. The legislature, in turn, responded by impeaching Yeltsin and declaring Aleksandr Rutskoy the new President of the Russian Federation.
1993	4 October	Russian constitutional crisis of 1993: The army occupied the parliament building and arrested a number of its leaders.
1993	12 December	Russian constitutional crisis of 1993: A new 5th Russian constitution was approved by referendum, vastly increasing the power of the presidency.
1994	2 August	First Chechen War: The leader of the Russian-backed Provisional Council of the Chechen Republic announced his intention to overthrow Dudayev's government.
1994	11 December	First Chechen War: Russian troops entered Chechnya.
1996	3 July	1996 Russian presidential election: Yeltsin narrowly defeated his communist challenger, Gennady Zyuganov.
1996	30 August	First Chechen War: The Khasav-Yurt Accord was signed, signaling the end of the war.
1999	7 August	Dagestan War: A Chechnya-based militia invaded the Russian republic of Dagestan in support of local separatists.
1999	16 August	The State Duma confirmed the appointment of Vladimir Putin as Prime Minister of Russia.
1999	23 August	Dagestan War: The militias began their retreat back into Chechnya.
1999	26 August	Second Chechen War: The militia that had invaded Dagestan was bombed inside Chechnya.
1999	September	Second Chechen War: Russian apartment bombings
1999	2 October	Second Chechen War: Russian ground troops entered Chechnya.
1999	8 December	The treaty of creation of the Union of Russia and Belarus was signed.
1999	31 December	Boris Yeltsin resigned as President of the Russian Federation. Prime Minister Putin became acting president.
2000	26 March	2000 Russian presidential election: Putin was elected President of Russia with 53 percent of the vote.
2000	12 August	Russian submarine Kursk explosion: An explosion disabled the Russian submarine K-141 Kursk.

== 21st century ==
Year	Date	Event
2001	23 March	Mir - the last national orbital station re-entered Earth's atmosphere.
2002	23 October	Moscow theater hostage crisis: Chechen rebels seized the Dubrovka theater in Moscow, taking approximately 700 theatergoers hostage, and demanded an immediate Russian withdrawal from Chechnya.
2002	26 October	Moscow theater hostage crisis: The police pumped anesthetic into the building, then stormed it from every entrance, executing all 42 terrorists. Over 120 hostages also died due to cumulative effects of intoxication, hunger and maltreatment by the terrorists.
2003	September–October	Russia-Ukraine territorial dispute over Tuzla Island
2003	25 October	Yukos affair: Khodorkovsky arrested.
2004	January	Russia–Belarus energy dispute.
2004	14 March	2004 Russian presidential election: Putin won re-election to a second term, earning 71% of the vote.
2004	24 August	Russian aircraft bombings killed all 90 people on board.
2004	1–3 September	Beslan school siege. A group of Chechen terrorists took approximately 1100 adults and children hostage at School Number One in Beslan, the ensuing battle left over 330 civilians, 31 of 32 hostage-takers and 10 policemen dead.
2004	September	Vladimir Putin came up with an initiative to change the appointment procedure for governors, proposing to confirm them in office by decision of legislature from the candidates proposed by the President. Putin logically linked his initiative to the Beslan tragedy.
2004	December	A bill to abolish direct gubernatorial elections was drafted and adopted.
2005	13 October	2005 raid on Nalchik: A large group of terrorists assaulted and captured buildings throughout the city of Nalchik. By afternoon, Russian soldiers surrounded and entered the city, forcing their enemies to retreat. Some 136 people were killed.
2005	1 December	Perm Oblast and Komi-Permyak Autonomous Okrug merged into Perm Krai.
2006	15–17 July	32nd G8 summit in St. Petersburg
2007	23 April	Boris Yeltsin died of congestive heart failure.
2008	2 March	2008 Russian presidential election: Deputy Prime minister Dmitry Medvedev won, earning 70.5% of the vote.
2008	7 May	Vladimir Putin becomes Prime Minister of Russia.
2008	7–12 August	Russo-Georgian War: Russia revoked Georgia's attempts to reintegrate breakaway republics of South Ossetia and Abkhazia.
2008	31 December	2008 Constitutional amendments extended the terms of the President and Parliament
2009	January	2009 Russia–Ukraine gas dispute
2009	12–16 May	Eurovision Song Contest 2009
2009	17 August	Sayano-Shushenskaya power station accident
2009	5 December	"Lame Horse" nightclub fire
2010	8 April	The New START treaty, which would cut the nuclear arsenals of Russia and the United States by a third, was signed.
2010	July–August	2010 Russian wildfires
2011	27 March	Time zones reform reduced its number from 11 to 9
2011	4 December	2011 Russian legislative election, that caused large protests against alleged vote fraud
2012	4 March	2012 Russian presidential election: Vladimir Putin won, earning 63.6% of the vote.
2012	1 June	an Act came into force, which returns the direct election of Governors.
2012	22 August	Russia became a WTO member.
2013	6–17 July	2013 Summer Universiade in Kazan
2013	August–September	Russian Far East and Northeastern China affected by heavy flooding on Amur river
2014	7–23 February	2014 Winter Olympics in Sochi
2014	16 March	Annexation of Crimea by the Russian Federation: Referendum on the political status of Crimea
2014	18 March	Annexation of Crimea by the Russian Federation: Putin and Crimean officials signed the Treaty on Accession of the Republic of Crimea to Russia.
2014	26 October	2011 time zones reform was canceled
2015	1 January	The Treaty on the Eurasian Economic Union came into force.
2015	30 September	Russian military intervention in the Syrian civil war begins
2015	31 October	Aircraft bombing over Sinai
2015	24 November	2015 Russian Sukhoi Su-24 shootdown
2016	8 September	2016 Russian legislative election
2016	19 December	Assassination of Andrei Karlov
2017	1–3 June	St. Petersburg International Economic Forum
2017	17 June - 2 July	2017 FIFA Confederations Cup
2018	18 March	2018 Russian presidential election
2018	25-26 March	2018 Kemerovo fire killed at least 60 people.
2018	14 June–15 July	The 2018 FIFA World Cup was held in Russia.
2018	July–November	2018 Russian pension protests
2018	15 October	2018 Moscow–Constantinople schism
2018	17 October	Kerch Polytechnic College massacre killed 21 people including the perpetrator.
2019	8 September	2019 Moscow City Duma election preceded by massive public protests in support of unregistered opposition candidates.
2019	23–24 October	The first (inaugural) Russia-Africa Summit is held at Sochi.
2020	15 January	2020 Presidential Address to the Federal Assembly. Announcement of the constitutional reform. Resignation of the Cabinet.
2020	1 July	2020 Russian constitutional referendum
2022	24 February	Russian invasion of Ukraine begins
2022	21 September	2022 Russian mobilization
2022	30 September	Russian annexation of Donetsk, Kherson, Luhansk and Zaporizhzhia oblasts
2023	23–24 June	Wagner Group rebellion
2024	16 February	Death and funeral of Alexei Navalny
2024	22 March	Crocus City Hall attack
2024	6 August	Kursk offensive (2024–present)

== See also ==
- Years in Russia, 1991–present

Cities in Russia

- Timeline of Grozny
- Timeline of Kaliningrad
- Timeline of Kazan
- Timeline of Krasnodar
- Timeline of Makhachkala
- Timeline of Moscow
- Timeline of Nizhny Novgorod
- Timeline of Novosibirsk
- Timeline of Omsk
- Timeline of Pskov
- Timeline of Rostov-on-Don
- Timeline of Saint Petersburg
- Timeline of Samara
- Timeline of Smolensk
- Timeline of Vladivostok
- Timeline of Volgograd
- Timeline of Voronezh
- Timeline of Yekaterinburg

== Sources ==
- "Хронология русской истории" . Brockhaus and Efron Encyclopedic Dictionary (in Russian). 1906.
