= Timeline of Rostov-on-Don =

The following is a timeline of the history of the city of Rostov-on-Don, Russia.

== Prior to 20th century ==
- 1761 - Fortress of Saint Dimitry of Rostov established.
- 1796 - Settlement chartered, becomes seat of Rostovsky Uyezd within Novorossiysk Governorate.
- 1811 - Coat of arms design adopted.
- 1834 - Port established; fort demolished.
- 1842 - Synagogue built.
- 1868 - Main Choral Synagogue built.
- 1869 - Rostov-Glavny train station built.
- 1870 - Kharkiv-Rostov railway begins operating.
- 1881 - Population: 70,700.
- 1896 - Moskovskaya Hotel built.
- 1897 - Population: 119,889.
- 1899 - Rostov City Hall built.

== 20th century ==
- 1905 - Population: 126,375.
- 1908 - Alexander Nevsky Cathedral, Rostov-on-Don built.
- 1912 - Zaslavskaya House built.
- 1913 - Population: 204,725.
- 1915 - Rostov State University founded.
- 1917 - Cossacks take city.
- 1920
  - January: Red Army takes city.
  - Temernitskiy District established.
- 1926 - Population: 308,103.
- 1927 - Rostov Zoo established.
- 1928
  - Nakhichevan-on-Don becomes part of city.
  - Regional capital relocated to Rostov from Novocherkassk.
- 1929
  - Proletarskiy City District, Rostov-on-Don created.
  - Rostselmash agricultural equipment company established.
- 1930
  - Selmashstroy football club formed.
  - Olimp-2 stadium built.
- 1936 - Pervomaiske Raion established.
- 1937
  - RODKA football club formed.
  - Oktyabrskiy City District, Rostov-on-Don, Zheleznodorozhny City District, Rostov-on-Don, and Rostov Oblast established.
- 1939
  - Rostvertol helicopter manufactory established.
  - Population: 520,253.
- 1941 - November: Battle of Rostov (1941).
- 1942 - City taken by German forces.
  - Up to 30,000 Russian Jews massacred there at a site called Zmievskaya Balka.
- 1965
  - Voroshilovsky bridge built.
  - Population: 720,000.
- 1969 - Memorial complex to the Fallen Warriors unveiled.
- 1971 - SKA SKVO Stadium built.
- 1973 - Sovetskiy City District, Rostov-on-Don created.
- 1985
  - Voroshilovsky City District, Rostov-on-Don established.
  - Population: 986,000.
- 1992 - Rostov Chamber of Commerce established.
- 1994 - Rostov State Medical University active.
- 1996
  - Mikhail Chernyshev becomes mayor.
  - Vladimir Chub becomes governor of Rostov Oblast.
- 2000 - City becomes part of the Southern Federal District.

== 21st century ==
- 2007 - Church of the Intercession built.
- 2009, 24 July - 2009 Rostov-on-Don bus crash occurs near city.
- 2010
  - Stele City of Military Glory erected.
  - Population: 1,089,261.
- 2016, 19 March - Flydubai Flight 981 crashes.
- 2023, 23 June - Wagner Group rebellion, Rostov is captured by the Wagner Group.
- 2023, 24 June - Wagner Group withdraws from Rostov.

== See also ==
- Rostov-on-Don history
- History of Rostov-on-Don
- Timelines of other cities in the Southern Federal District of Russia: Krasnodar, Volgograd

== Bibliography ==
- "Rostof, on river Don". Hand-book for Travellers in Russia, Poland, and Finland (2nd ed.). London: John Murray. 1868.
- Peter Wiernik (1907), "Rostof", Jewish Encyclopedia, vol. 10, New York, hdl:2027/osu.32435029752854
- "Rostov-on-the-Don" . Encyclopædia Britannica. Vol. 23 (11th ed.). 1910. p. 755.
- "Rostov-on-the-Don", Russia, Leipzig: Karl Baedeker, 1914, OCLC 1328163
- Brian Murphy (2005). Rostov in the Russian Civil War, 1917-1920. Routledge. ISBN 1-134-27128-X.
