= Palace of Children and Youth Creativity (Rostov-on-Don) =

- Дворец творчества детей и молодёжи (Ростов-на-Дону) (Russian)
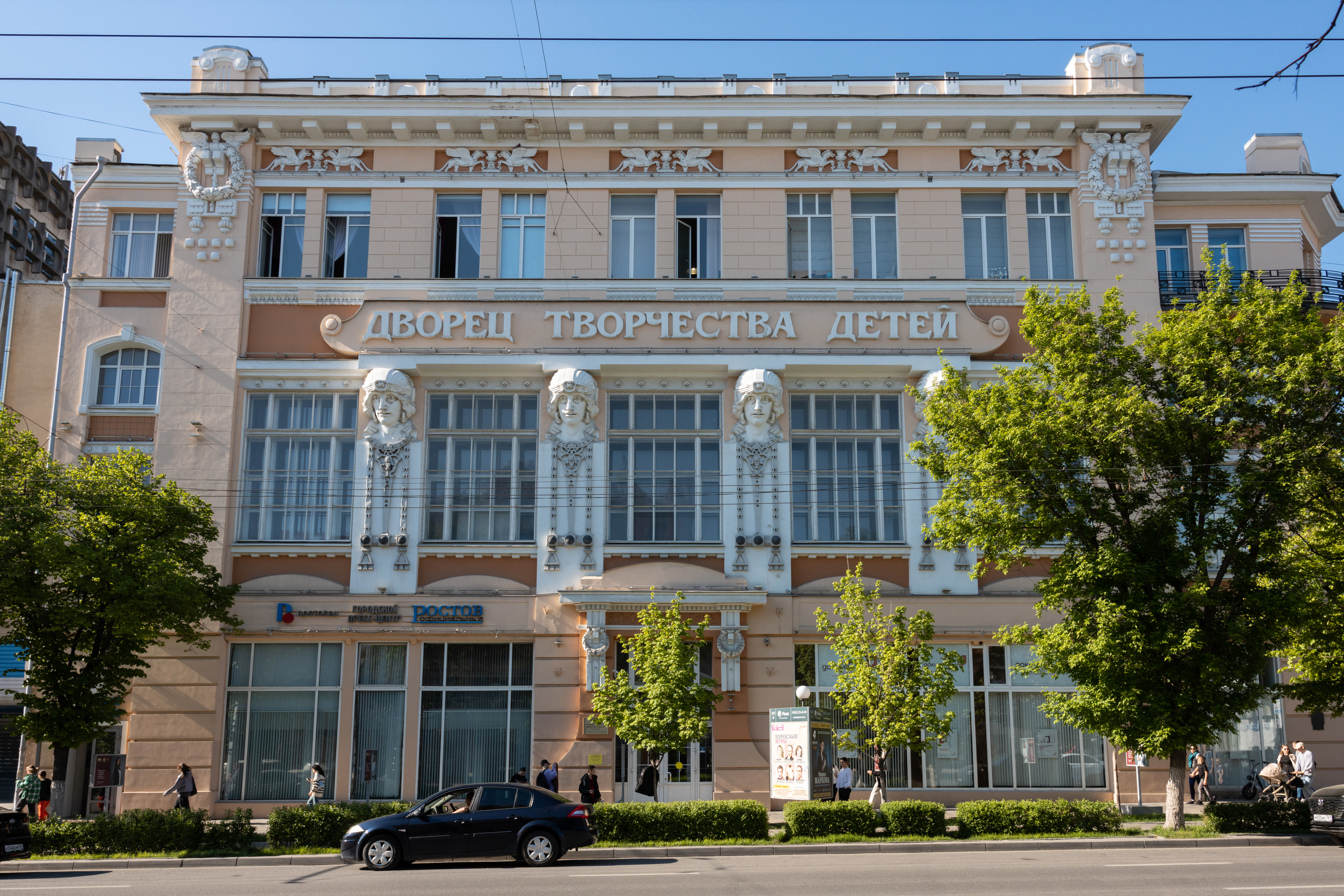

- Location within Russia
- 47°13′19.49″N 39°42′55.40″E
- Type: Youth Education Center
- Location: Rostov-on-Don, Rostov Oblast, Russia

The Palace of Children and Youth Creativity (Russian: Дворец творчества детей и молодёжи) is an educational youth center in Rostov-on-Don, Russia. It works with roughly 1,100 children from ages 5 to 18 and employs 300 educators. It is located in the former Volga-Kama Bank Building, at 55 Bolshaya Sadovaya Street.

== History ==
On 23 May 1936, the Palace of Pioneers and October was opened in Rostov-on-Don in the former Volga-Kama Bank Building at the corner of Gazetny Lane and Engels Street (now Bolshaya Sadovaya Street). In the autumn of 1936, the first two sections of the Palace, science-technical and artistic, were opened for operation. Its departments opened in series: naturalistic department (1937); military sports department (1938); political-mass department (1939).

During the Second World War (1941–1945) work groups and sections of the Palace of the Pioneers were suspended during the occupation of the city by German troops. In the first post-war years, almost all previously existing sections continued their work.

On the left bank of the river Don the city camp of the Pioneer, Komsomol activists and pioneer leaders "Silver Pipe" was opened. At the Memorial complex to the Fallen Warriors the Pioneer and Komsomol Post No. 1 was organized.

In 1991, the Palace of Pioneers was renamed the Palace of Children and Youth Creativity of Rostov-on-Don. During the 1998 Russian financial crisis, employees of the Palace stayed with the institution, opened the museums "Stories of the Don Region" and "Young Defenders of the Fatherland"; established the work of new clubs: "Petit" (young journalists) and "UNECA" (Young ecologists) and opened the first summer city school for gifted children "Hope".

== Structure ==
Ten departments operate in the Palace:

- Military-patriotic department
- Music studio
- Department of Applied Arts
- Department of social creativity
- Art department
- Ecological department
- Center for the development of children's and youth social initiatives
- Psychological service
- Gift center
