= Volga-Kama Bank Building =

Building in Rostov-on-Don, Russia

Coordinates: 47°13′19.49″N 39°42′55.40″E

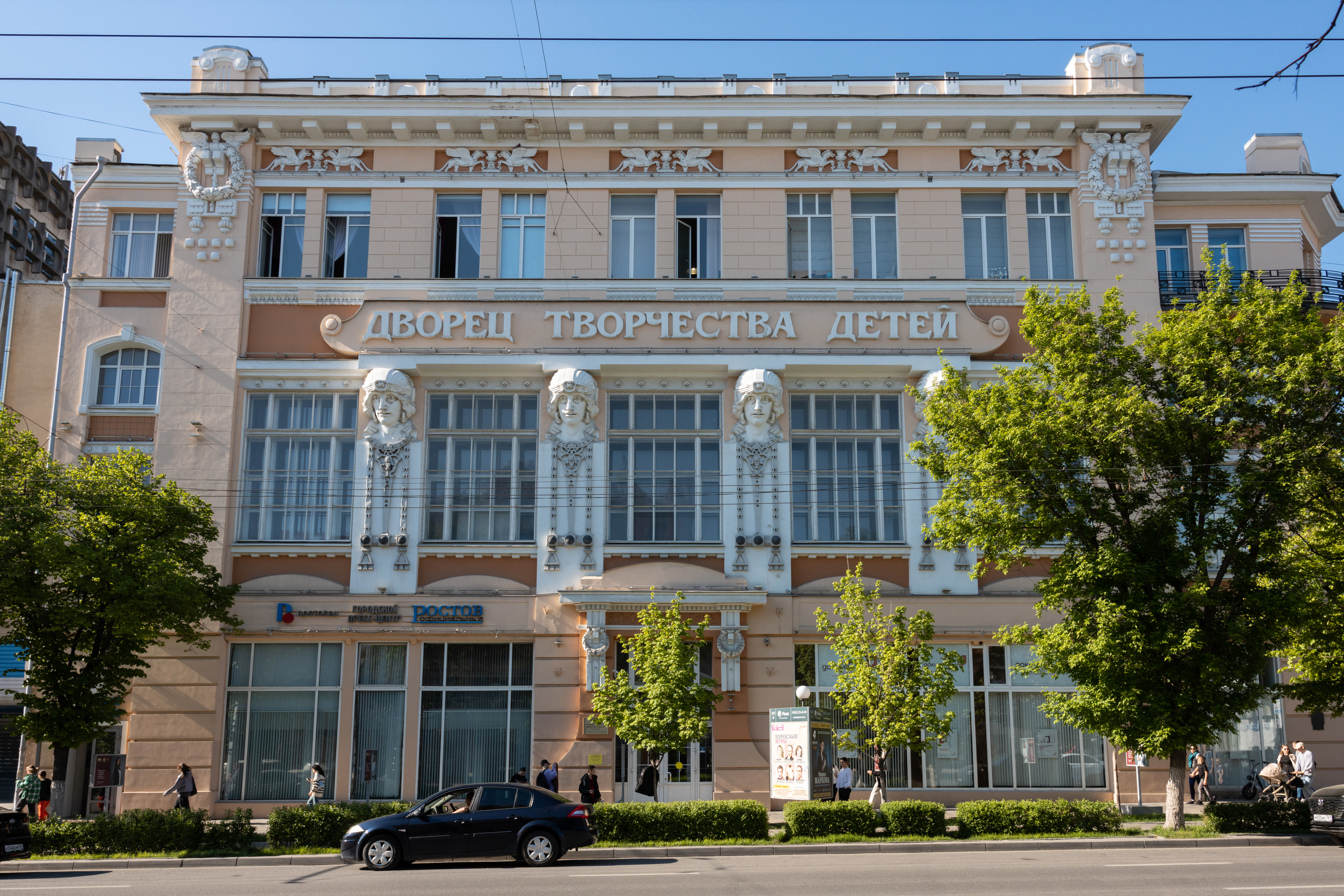
The Volga-Kama Bank Building, housing the Palace of Children and Youth Creativity.

Volga-Kama Bank Building (Russian: Здание Волжско-Камского банка) is a building in Rostov-on-Don constructed in Modern style in the beginning of the 20th century, on a design by architect Oleksiy Beketov for the Volga-Kama Commercial Bank. It has the status of an object of cultural heritage of federal significance.

== Architecture ==
The four-story building has an asymmetric form. The main facade is situated at the front of Bolshaya Sadovaya Street. The first floor was initially intended for commercial premises. Above is the double-glazed operating room. Vertical division of the front facade emphasizes the extreme vanes, large windows on the first floor and two-tiered windows of the operating room. These windows are divided by four piers with high relief masks, which support the bank's logo sign. The facade is completed by a large overhanging cornice, above which there is a parapet with curbstones.

Rustication of the first floor, cornice and arched entrance are elements borrowed from Classical architecture. At the same time, the stucco decoration of the facade, the attic, the shape of the windows and balconies attest to the belonging of the building to the Modern style.
