= 1971 Krasnodar bus bombing =

Bus bombing in Krasnodar, Russia

Krasnodar bus bombing
- Location: 43°29′28.34″N 43°36′1.91″E; Krasnodar, RSFSR, Soviet Union
- Date: 14 June 1971 c. 8:30 a.m. (MSK)
- Target: Bus passengers
- Attack type: Bombing, mass murder
- Weapon: Homemade bomb contained in a suitcase
- Deaths: 10
- Injuries: 20–90
- Perpetrators: Peter Kuzmich Volynsky (Пётр Кузьмич Волынский)
- Motive: Misanthropy

The Krasnodar bus bombing (Russian: Взрыв автобуса в Краснодаре) occurred on a bus in Krasnodar on 14 June 1971, when a homemade suitcase bomb placed near the gas tank by mentally ill Peter Volynsky exploded, killing ten people and wounding 20 to 90 others.

== Perpetrator ==
Peter Kuzmich Volynsky was born in Krasnodar on 25 November 1939. He attended Kuban State Medical University. According to former classmates, Volynsky was an asocial and unremarkable young man who always carried a suitcase. After exhibiting unusual and paranoid behavior, Volynsky was diagnosed with schizophrenia. Despite this, he graduated and went on to work at several hospitals, where he would continue to exhibit odd and unprofessional behavior. In a journal, he wrote about his desire to enact revenge on people taller than him.

== Bombing ==
Around 8:20 a.m., Volynsky boarded a bus with a suitcase bomb and placed the explosive near the gas tank. After the bus pulled off from the stop, Volynsky claimed to be sick and told the driver to release him urgently (according to another version, he went out at the next stop).

The explosion occurred at about 8:30 a.m. on Turgenev Street. The blast reportedly threw the bus into the air. Five people died on the spot, while another five subsequently died in the hospital. Many others were injured. The bomb was stuffed with metal balls, nails, and bearings, which struck the gas tank of the bus, as a result of which it caught fire. The driver, who was not seriously injured, managed to open the jammed doors and smash the window with the mounting, but the people who suffered severe injuries could not get out of the cabin and were burned in it. Surviving passengers said that they saw a man wearing a cap with a large black suitcase; in addition, one of the found parts was a piece of a fire extinguisher.

== Aftermath ==
The KGB found Volynsky two days after the bombing. In the bomber's apartment, gas cylinders, a box, gunpowder, disassembled bearings, and a nichrome wire were found, enough to destroy a five-storey house. As well as a Napoleon portrait with the inscription "I can do anything." Volynsky carefully calculated the cost of manufacturing explosive devices, as a result of which investigators managed to establish that the exploded bomb cost him only 40 rubles.

While interrogated, they asked Volynsky what prompted him to commit the crime. Volynsky simply said, "I hate people."

A forensic psychiatric examination recognized Volynsky as insane, and he was sent for compulsory treatment in a psychiatric hospital of a closed type in Novy Abisnky District, Krasnodar Krai. The bomber was initially reported to have died or disappeared in the mid-2000s; however, according to Komsomolskaya Pravda, a credible source reported that he was still alive and living in a psychiatric hospital as of February 2015.

== See also ==
- Timeline of Krasnodar
