= Timeline of Volgograd =

The following is a timeline of the history of the city of Volgograd, Russia.

== Prior to 20th century ==
- 1589 – Tsaritsyn founded.
- 1606 - Tsaritsyn took part in the rising in favour of the False Dmitry I.
- 1670 – Town taken by forces of Cossack Stenka Razin.
- 1774 – Town taken by forces of Yemelyan Pugachev.
- 1862 – Volga-Don Railway begins operating.
- 1871 – Volgograd railway station rebuilt.
- 1897
  - Ural-Volga metallurgy factory established.
  - Population: 55,914.
- 1900
  - Tsaritsyn city library established.
  - Population: 67,650.

== 20th century ==
- 1911 – Synagogue built.
- 1913 – Population: 100,817.
- 1917 – Tsaritsyn Soviet formed.
- 1918 – Battle of Tsaritsyn begins.
- 1925 – 10 April: City renamed "Stalingrad."
- 1926 – Population: 151,490.
- 1929 – Football Club Rotor Volgograd formed.
- 1930 – Stalingrad tractor factory begins operating.
- 1939 – Population: 445,476.
- 1942 – 19 August: Battle of Stalingrad begins.
- 1943 – 2 February: Battle of Stalingrad ends; Soviets in power.
- 1951 – Barmaley Fountain dismantled.
- 1952 – Volgograd Airport established.
- 1957 – Premiere of Bulgakov's play Flight.
- 1961
  - 10 November: City renamed "Volgograd."
  - Volga Hydroelectric Station commissioned near city.
- 1964
  - Astrakhan Bridge opens.
  - Central Stadium (Volgograd) built.
- 1965 – Population: 700,000.
- 1967 – The Motherland Calls monument unveiled.
- 1980 – Volgograd State University founded.
- 1984 – Volgograd Metrotram begins operating.
- 1985
  - Museum of the Battle of Stalingrad opens.
  - Population: 974,000.
- 1987 – Volgograd Symphony Orchestra founded.
- 1989 – Football Club Olimpia Volgograd formed.
- 1991 – Yuri Chekhov becomes mayor.
- 1992 – Volgograd State Pedagogical University active.
- 1996 – Nikolay Maksyuta becomes governor of Volgograd Oblast.
- 2000 – City becomes part of the Southern Federal District.

== 21st century ==
- 2003 – Volgograd Botanical Garden established.
- 2007 – 20 May: Volgograd mayoral election, 2007 held; Roman Grebennikov wins.
- 2008 – Football Club Volgograd formed.
- 2009 – Volgograd Bridge opens.
- 2010 – Population: 1,021,215.
- 2013
  - 9 May: Murder of Vladislav Tornovoy.
  - 21 October: October 2013 Volgograd bus bombing.
  - 29–30 December: December 2013 Volgograd bombings
- 2020 – 10 August: 2020 Volgograd explosion

== See also ==
- Volgograd history
- History of Volgograd
- Other names of Volgograd, e.g. Tsaritzin
- Timelines of other cities in the Southern Federal District of Russia: Krasnodar, Rostov-on-Don

== Bibliography ==
- "Tsaritsyn" . Encyclopædia Britannica. Vol. 27 (11th ed.). 1910. p. 348.
- "Tzaritzuin", Russia, Leipzig: Karl Baedeker, 1914, OCLC 1328163
- Donald J. Raleigh (1981). "Revolutionary Politics in Provincial Russia: The Tsaritsyn 'Republic' in 1917". Slavic Review. 40 (2): 194–209. doi:10.2307/2496946. JSTOR 2496946. S2CID 155570549.
- Joel C. Moses (2002). "Political-Economic Elites and Russian Regional Elections 1999-2000: Democratic Tendencies in Kaliningrad, Perm and Volgograd". Europe-Asia Studies. 54 (6): 905–931. doi:10.1080/0966813022000008456. JSTOR 826288. S2CID 153988955.
