= Gospel (Moscow) =

First book printed in Moscow

The Narrow-typed Gospel Book was the first book to be printed in Moscow, in 1553–1554. It was published by an anonymous printing house. There are currently copies in the Russian State Library in Moscow and elsewhere.
