= Timeline of Krasnodar =

The following is a timeline of the history of the city of Krasnodar, Russia.

== Prior to 20th century ==
- 1794 - Ekaterinodar founded "on the site of an old town called Tmutarakan."
- 1801 - Police force established.
- 1860
  - Ekaterinodar becomes seat of the Kuban Oblast.
  - Population: 9,620.
- 1868 - Konstantin Ivanovich Frolov becomes mayor.
- 1879 - Felitsyn Museum founded.
- 1886 - Population: 39,610.
- 1888 - Triumphal Arch, Krasnodar of Alexander III erected.
- 1897
  - Commemorative obelisk erected.
  - Population: 65,697.
- 1900 - Pushkin Krasnodar Regional Universal Scientific Library founded.

== 20th century ==
- 1904 - Krasnodar Regional Art Museum founded.
- 1912 - Statue of Catherine II erected.
- 1913 - Population: 107,360.
- 1920
  - City renamed "Krasnodar."
  - Krasnodar Children's Theatre active.
- 1924 - Kuban State University established.
- 1928
  - Football Club Kuban Krasnodar formed.
  - Hyperboloid Tower built.
- 1930 - Nevsky Cathedral demolished.
- 1932–1933 - Loss of over 14% of Krasnodar's population during the Soviet famine of 1932–1933
- 1933 - Krasnodar Opera Theatre founded.
- 1939 - Population: 203,946.
- 1942 - City occupation by German forces begins.
- 1943 - City occupation by German forces ends.
- 1956
  - House of the Soviets built.
  - Statue of Lenin erected.
- 1959 - Dendrarium Kubansk Agricultural Institute established.
- 1960 - Kuban Stadium opens.
- 1961 - 1961 Krasnodar riots.
- 1965 - Population: 385,000.
- 1971 - 14 June: 1971 Krasnodar bus bombing.
- 1973 - Krasnodar reservoir constructed.
- 1985 - Population: 609,000.
- 1987 - Valery Alexandrovich Samoilenko becomes mayor.
- 1990 - Mikhail Sergeyevich Karakaj becomes mayor.
- 1991 - Krasnodar Municipal Youth Theatre founded.
- 1992 - Krasnodar Ballet Theatre founded.
- 1994 - Nikolai Fedorovich Kryazhevskikh becomes mayor.
- 1997 - Nikolai Kondratenko becomes governor of Krasnodar Krai.
- 2000
  - Nikolai Vasilievich Priz becomes mayor.
  - City becomes part of the Southern Federal District.

== 21st century ==
- 2001 - Southern Telecom headquartered in Krasnodar.
- 2003
  - 25 August: Bombing.
  - Red Square (shop) in business.
- 2005 - Vladimir Yevlanov becomes mayor.
- 2008 - Football Club Krasnodar formed.
- 2010 - Population: 744,933.
- 2011
  - Fountain installed in Theater Square.
  - Basket-Hall (arena) opens.
- 2013 - Krasnodar Stadium construction begins.

== See also ==
- Timelines of other cities in the Southern Federal District of Russia: Rostov-on-Don, Volgograd

== Bibliography ==
- "Ekaterinodar", Hand-book for Travellers in Russia, Poland, and Finland (4th ed.), London: J. Murray, 1888
- "Ekaterinodar" . Encyclopædia Britannica. Vol. 9 (11th ed.). 1910. p. 139.
- "Yekaterinodar", Russia, Leipzig: Karl Baedeker, 1914, OCLC 1328163
- William Henry Beable (1919), "Ekaterinodar", Russian Gazetteer and Guide, London: Russian Outlook
