= Stele City of Military Glory =

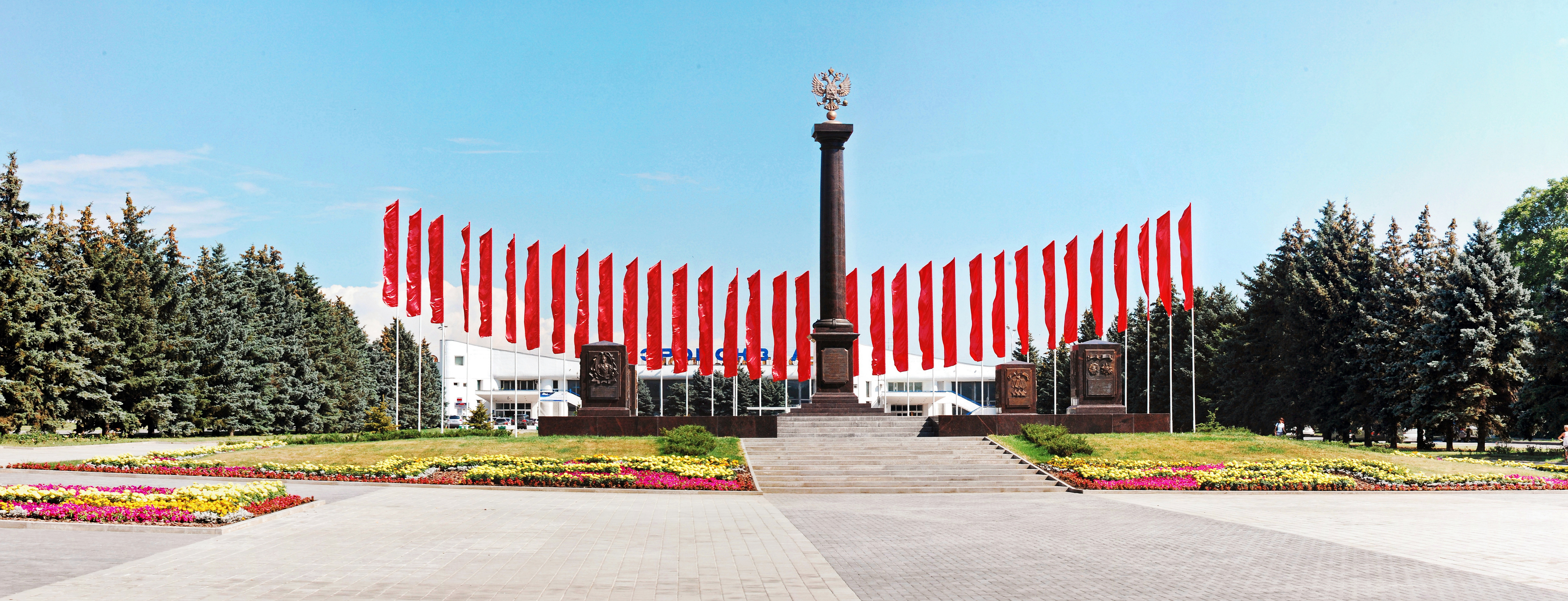
- Interactive map of Stele City of Military Glory
- Location: Rostov-on-Don, Rostov Oblast, Russia
- Coordinates: 47°15′24″N 39°48′05″E

Stele “City of Military Glory” is a memorial, located in Pervomaisk district of Rostov-on-don. It is created in commemoration of assignment to the city of the honorary title of the Russian Federation "City of Military Glory". It was inaugurated on May 6, 2010 on the square in front of the airport, which was named ”Square of Military Glory”.

== Description ==
The monument is a round column of red granite 6.5 m high with a bronze emblem of Russia on top. On the square pedestal of the column on the one hand the coat of arms of Rostov-on-Don is shown, and on the other is the text of the Decree of the President of the Russian Federation on granting the city the honorary title "city of military glory". The column is surrounded by four square pillars with bas-reliefs on the military history of Rostov-on-Don and victories over the Nazis. The authors of the monument are an architect Y. Dvornikov and A. Musienko. The authors of the bas-reliefs are a sculptor Sergei Oleshnya, G. Myasnikov and A. Dementiev. The bas-reliefs was cast in the workshop of art moulding.

== History ==
In early 2007, the representatives of veteran organizations took the initiative to give Rostov the honorary title of "City of Military Glory". The mayor of Rostov Michael Tchernyshev has endorsed this initiative, and the deputies of the Rostov city Duma has sent the President of Russia the petition for assignment of Rostov the title "City of Military Glory". The honorary title of the Russian Federation "City of Military Glory "was awarded to Rostov-on-Don by presidential decree of May 5, 2008 № 556"for courage, fortitude and mass heroism shown by the defenders of the city in the struggle for freedom and independence of the Fatherland" . According to the decree of the President of Russia, in all cities awarded the title of "City of Military Glory", steles created by a single project are established. Several options as Karl Marx square, Bolshaya Sadovaya street were considered as a place to install the stele. As a result, it was decided to install a stele in the square in front of the Rostov airport.
