= Rostov Zoo =

Rostov-on-Don Zoo
- Ростовский зоопарк
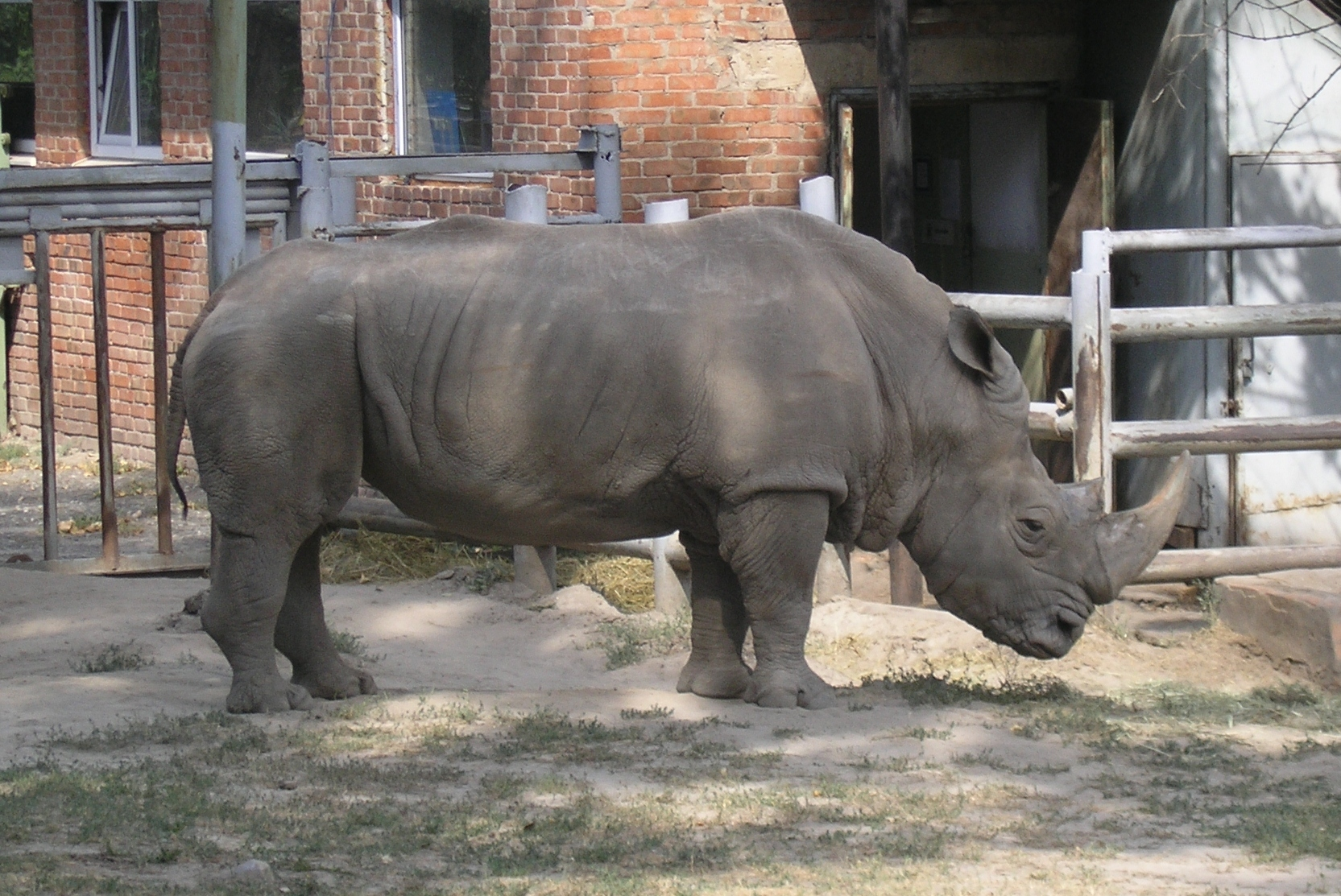
- Interactive map of Rostov-on-Don Zoo
- 47°15′09″N 39°40′15″E
- Location: Rostov-on-Don, Rostov Oblast, Russia
- Land area: 98.2 hectares
- No. of animals: 5.000
- No. of species: 400
- Annual visitors: ↘184 370 (2014), ↗185 555 (2015)
- Major exhibits: 1
- Director: Alexander Zhadobin (since Dec 2016)
- Website: Official website

Rostov-on-Don Zoo is a zoo in Russia located in Rostov-on-Don.

== Overview ==
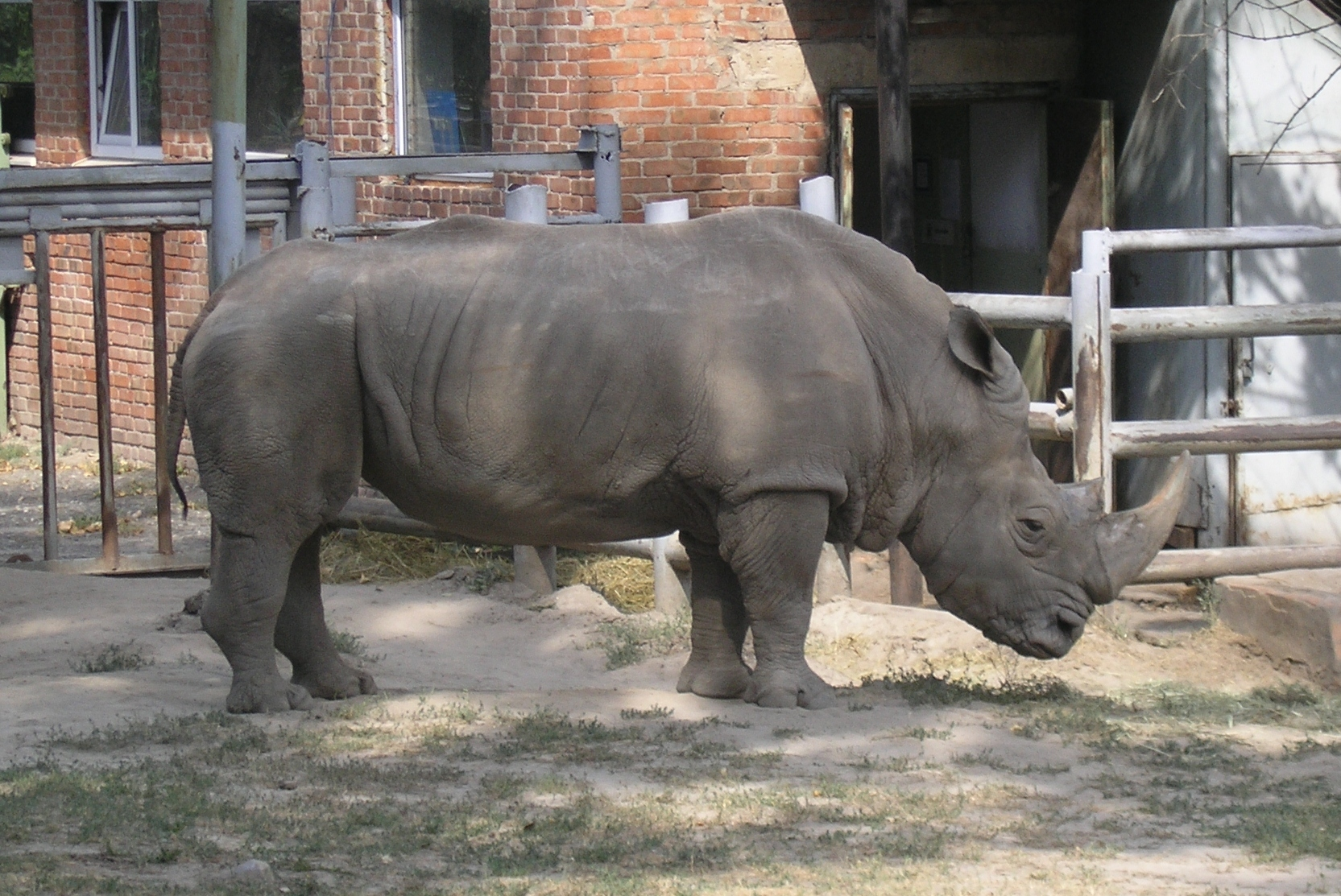
Rhinoceros in Rostov-on-Don Zoo, August 2008

The zoo is a member of 38 programs involved in the conservation of endangered animals. It features such animals as tigers, lions, pygmy hippopotamus, Asian elephants, Dagestan and Bezoar goats, Siamese crocodiles, and flamingos.

== History ==
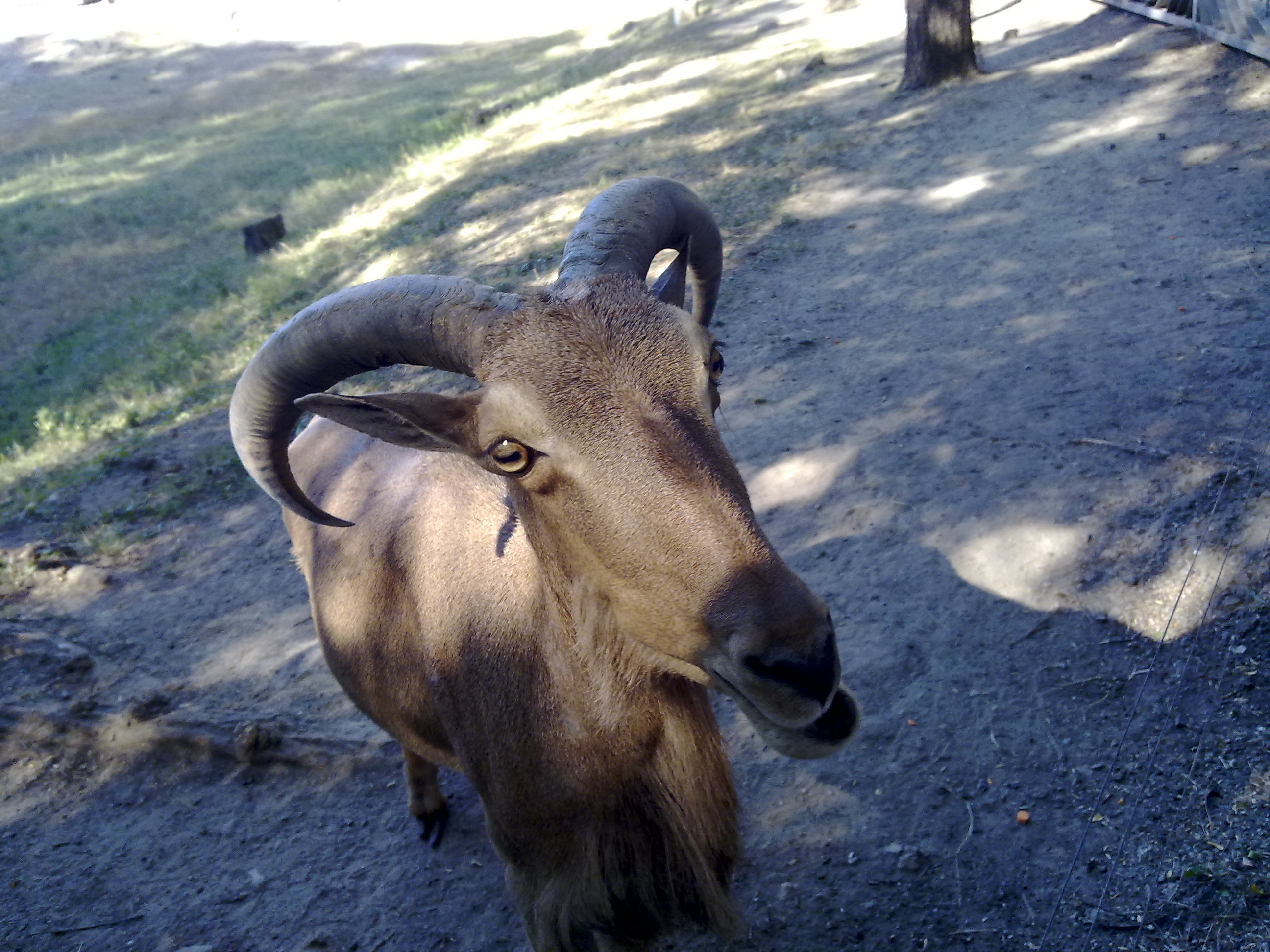
Barbary sheep in Rostov-on-Don Zoo, 2010

The zoo was founded in June 1927 to serve as a pet enclosure for a nearby school named after Marshal S. M. Budyonny (now known as School No. 43 on Budennovsky Street, 64). The school's collection of animals was moved to the outskirts of the town in the autumn of 1929.

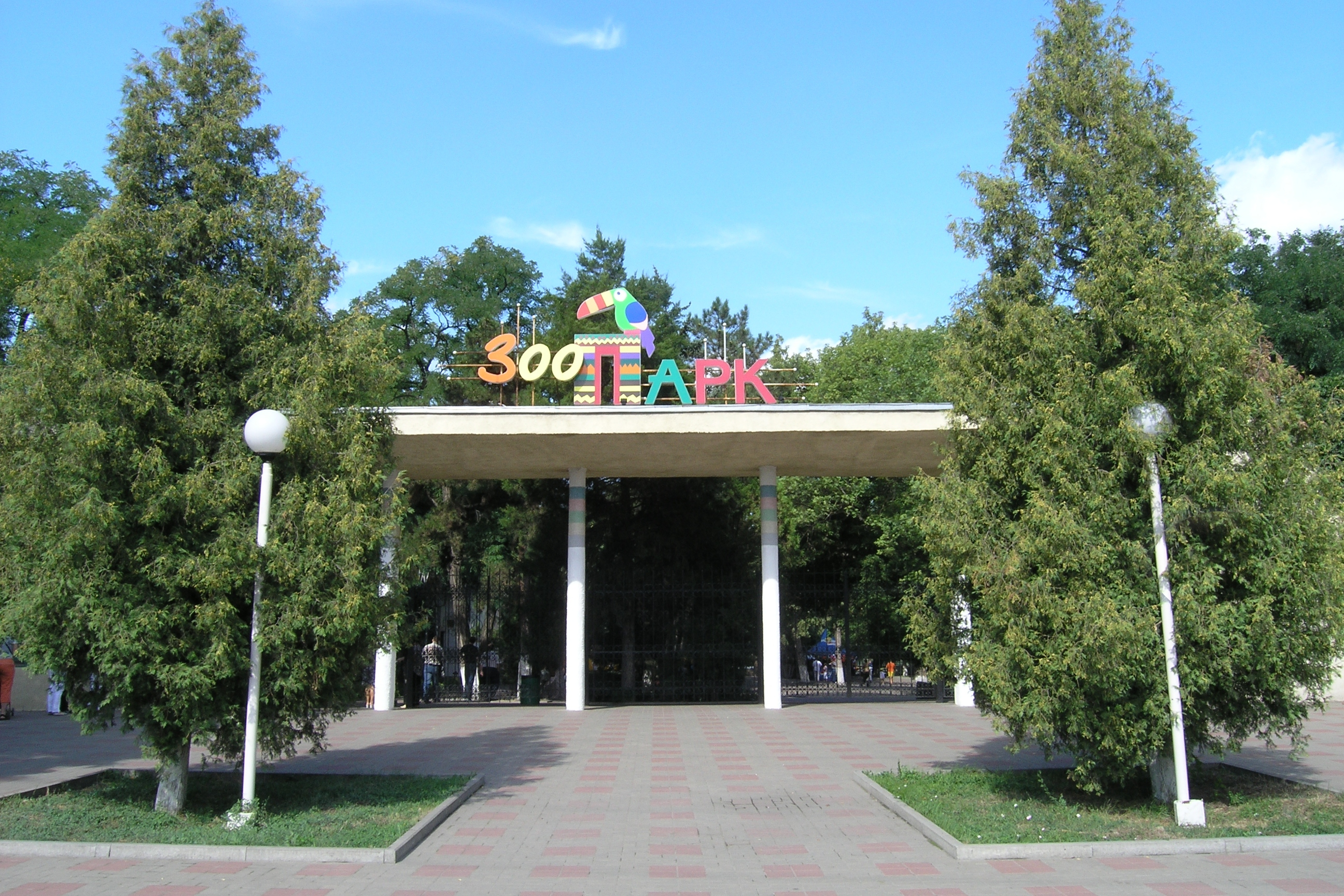
Rostov-on-Don Zoo, August 2009

On 5 September 2009, Rostov-on-Don Zoo received three elephants, which had previously been held at the Berlin Zoo Friedrichsfelde. The zoo, which by that time had not had elephants in over twenty years, now hosts them, having exchanged a polar bear for them. In December 2010, a female baby elephant was born in the zoo.
