= Memorial complex to the Fallen Warriors =

- Interactive map of Memorial complex to the Fallen Warriors
- Location: Rostov-on-Don, Rostov Oblast, Russia

Мemorial Complex «To the Fallen Warriors» — is a monument with eternal fire in Rostov-on-Don in the Frunze square in Karl Marx square. Dedicated to the soldiers and peaceful people who died in the Great Patriotic War. The monument was opened in 1969. The authors of the memorial are E.G. Mirzoev and A.V. Simonenko. Since 1975, the eternal fire operates Post No. 1. The memorial complex "The Fallen Soldiers" has the status of an object of cultural heritage of local significance.

== History ==
In 1943, after the liberation of the city in the public garden named after Frunze, a mass grave appeared, where more than 300 Soviet soldiers and civilians who were killed during the occupation and in battles for Rostov were buried. In April 1957, a monument was erected at the mass grave.

== Description ==
The memorial is a massive concrete half ring, mounted horizontally on two supports. On the inner side of the ring is a metal bas-relief depicting the grieving motherland. In her right hand she holds a laurel branch. In the center of the ring there is an eternal flame. It is framed by a five-pointed star, which rests on 45 closed bayonets. According to the authors of the memorial, the semicircle symbolizes forcibly interrupted life. Authors of the monument - Rostov sculptors E. G. Mirzoev, A. V. Vasiliev and architect L. V. Simonenko.
