= 1814 in Russia =

This article lists notable events from the year 1814 in Russia.

== Incumbents ==
- Monarch – Alexander I
- Chancellor – Nikolay Rumyantsev

== Events ==
- Battle of Paris (1814)
- Treaty of Fontainebleau (1814)
- Treaty of Chaumont
- Eight Articles of London

== Births ==
- Anna Davidovna Abamelik-Lazareva, translator (died 1889)
- Mikhail Bakunin, revolutionary anarchist and philosopher (died 1876)
- Gustav Fabergé, jeweler and father of Carl Fabergé (died 1894)
- Ivan Gagarin, convert to Roman Catholicism and Jesuit (died 1882)
- Iosif Goshkevich, diplomat (died 1875)
- Yelena Hahn, writer and mother of Helena Blavatsky (died 1842)
- Jehiel Heller, rabbi (died 1861)
- Nikolai Krabbe, admiral of the Imperial Navy (died 1876)
- Julia Kurakina, noblewoman and lady-in-waiting (died 1881)
- Mikhail Lermontov, poet and painter (died 1841)
