= 1796 in Russia =

- Decades: 1770s; 1780s; 1790s; 1800s; 1810s
- See also: History of Russia; Timeline of Russian history; List of years in Russia

Events from the year 1796 in Russia.

== Incumbents ==
- Monarch – Catherine II (until November 17), Paul I (after November 17)

== Events ==
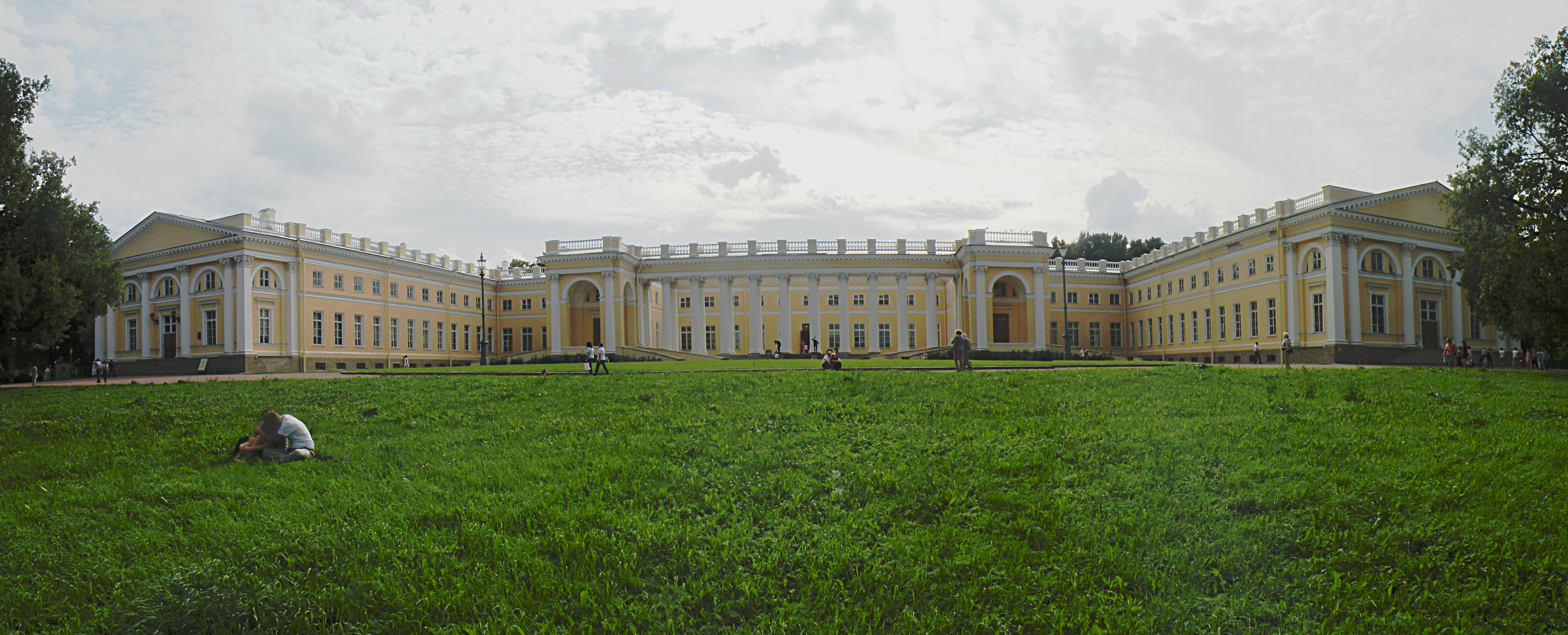
Facade of the Alexander Palace, 2013

- Persian Expedition of 1796
  - Storming of Derbent - May 10
- Alexander Palace completed
- Gomel Palace completed
- New Russia trading post established in what is modernly Yakutat, Alaska
- Ulyanovsk (then "Simbirsk") granted city status
- Vsevolod, a 74-gun ship of the line, launched

== Births ==
- Nicholas I of Russia, monarch (d. 1855)
- Pavel Petrovich Anosov, mining engineer, governor, and general (d. 1851)
- Alexander Bagration-Imeretinsky, Georgian prince, Russian general
- Nikolai Brashman, mathematician (d. 1866)
- Nikolai Lukash, general and civil servant (d. 1868)
- Sergey Muravyov-Apostol, Decembrist (d. 1826)
- Mikhail Muravyov-Vilensky, civil servant and statesman (d. 1866)
- Nikita Muravyov, Decembrist (d. 1843)
- Yevgeny Obolensky, Decembrist (d. 1865)
- Nikolai Polevoy, editor, writer, historian (d. 1846)
- Nikolai Turczaninow, botanist (d. 1863)

== Deaths ==
- Catherine II, monarch (born 1729)
- Nikolay Arsenyev, general (b. circa 1739)
- Juvenaly of Alaska, Russian Orthodox martyr (b. 1761)
- Ermil Kostrov, poet and translator (b. 1755)
- Andrei Miloradovich, general and governor (b. 1727)
- Pavel Potemkin, soldier, statesman, writer (b. 1743)
- Gavriil Pribylov, navigator
- Pyotr Rumyantsev, general, (born 1725)
