= 1800 in Russia =

- Decades: 1780s; 1790s; 1800s; 1810s; 1820s
- See also: History of Russia; Timeline of Russian history; List of years in Russia

Events from the year 1800 in Russia

== Incumbents ==
- Monarch – Paul I

== Events ==
- Chevalier Guard Regiment founded
- April 2 - Treaty of Constantinople (1800)
- December 16 - Second League of Armed Neutrality formed
- December 18 - Annexation of Kingdom of Kartli-Kakheti

== Births ==
- Pyotr Pakhtusov, explorer and surveyor, died 1835
- Pyotr Stepanov (actor), actor, died 1869
- Alexander von Volborth, palaeontologist, died 1876
- March 2 - Yevgeny Baratynsky, poet, died 1844
- March 31 - Osip Senkovsky, orientalist and writer, died 1858
- May 10 - Nikolai Titov, composer and general, died 1875
- July 20 - Alexander Veltman, writer, died 1870
- August 10 - Otto August Rosenberger, astronomer, died 1890
- August 13 - Fyodor Iordan, engraver and art professor, died 1883
- September 4 - Alexander Kushelev-Bezborodko, nobleman and politician, died 1855
- November 23 - Mikhail Pogodin, historian and journalist, died 1875
- December 28 - Vasily Sadovnikov, painter, died 1879

== Deaths ==
- Mikhail Kakhovsky, general, born 1734
- Pyotr Krechetnikov, general and governor of Astrakhan, born 1727
- Ivan Lyakhov, merchant and explorer
- April 27 - Yevstigney Fomin, opera composer, born 1761
- May 18 - Alexander Suvorov, general, born 1730
- September 17 - Johann Euler, astronomer and mathematician, born 1734
- October 8 - Salawat Yulayev, Bashkir leader in Pugachev's Rebellion, born 1756
- December 14 - José de Ribas, military officer, born 1749
