= 1799 in Russia =

- Decades: 1770s; 1780s; 1790s; 1800s; 1810s
- See also: History of Russia; Timeline of Russian history; List of years in Russia

The following article lists events that happened during the year 1799 in Russia.

== Incumbents ==
- Monarch – Paul I

== Events ==
- War of the Second Coalition - Featured Alexander Suvoruv's campaigns in Italy and Switzerland (see Campaigns of 1799 in the French Revolutionary Wars).
  - March 3 - Siege of Corfu (1798–1799) ends with Corfu's surrender.
  - Italian and Swiss expedition of 1799
    - April 27 - Battle of Cassano (1799)
    - May 12 - Battle of Bassignana (1799)
    - May 16 - First Battle of Marengo (1799)
    - June 17–19 - Battle of Trebbia (1799)
    - August 15 - Battle of Novi (1799)
    - September 24–26 - Battle of Gotthard Pass
    - September 25–26 - Second Battle of Zurich
  - August 27 - November 19 - Anglo-Russian invasion of Holland
    - September 19 - Battle of Bergen (1799)
    - October 2 - Battle of Alkmaar (1799)
    - October 6 - Battle of Castricum
    - October 18 - Convention of Alkmaar
- July 8 - Ukase of 1799 founding Russian-American Company and delineating Russian claims.

== Births ==
- Dmitry Bagration-Imeretinsky - member of former Georgian royal family, general (d. 1845)
- Avdotia Istomina - ballerina (d. 1848)
- Pyotr Kakhovsky - army officer, participant in Decembrist revolt (d. 1826)
- January 9 - Arvid Adolf Etholén, navy officer, explorer, and official of the Russian-American Company (d. 1876)
- January 17 - Adolph Theodor Kupffer, Baltic German chemist and physicist (d. 1865)
- March 1 - Alexey Verstovsky, composer (d. 1862)
- May 8 - Konstantin Igelström, army officer, participant in Decembrist revolt (d. 1851)
- May 26 – Alexander Pushkin - poet, playwright, and novelist (d. 1837)
- June 8 - Ludwig zu Sayn-Wittgenstein-Berleburg, Russo-German aristocrat (d. 1866)
- June 10 - Fyodor Bruni, artist (d. 1875)
- August 1 - Countess of Ségur, Franco-Russian writer (d. 1874)
- September 13 - Mikhail Lavrov, admiral and Arctic explorer (d. 1882)
- December 12 - Karl Bryullov, painter (d. 1852)

== Deaths ==
- Maria Zubova, poet, composer, and singer (b. 1749?)
- January 6 - Alexander Ivanovich Shilov, one of the founders of the Skoptsy sect (b. unknown)
- January 13 - Ivan Ivanovich Belsky, painter (b. 1719)
- April 6 - Alexander Bezborodko, statesman (b. 1747)
- May - Joasaph Bolotov, missionary and bishop of Kodiak (b. 1761)
- May 19 - N. P. Osipov, writer, poet, and translator (b. 1751)
- August 2 - Vasily Bazhenov, architect (b. 1737 or 1738)
