= 1794 in Russia =

- Decades: 1770s; 1780s; 1790s; 1800s; 1810s
- See also: History of Russia; Timeline of Russian history; List of years in Russia

== Incumbents ==
- Monarch – Catherine II

== Events ==
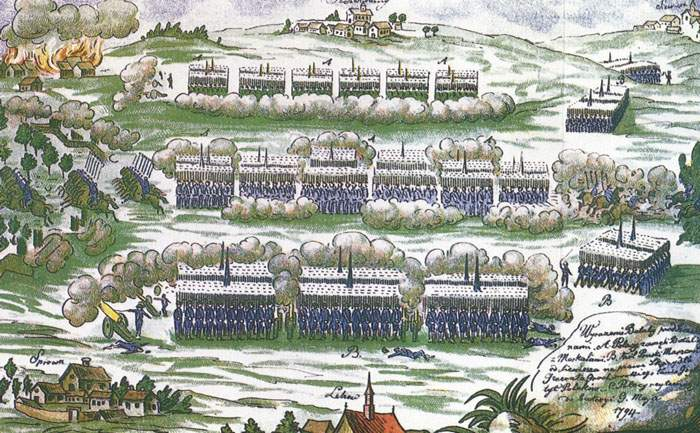
Battle of Szczekociny, 1794, by Michał Stachowicz

- Kościuszko Uprising
  - April 4 - Battle of Racławice
  - April 17–19 - Warsaw Uprising (1794)
  - April 22 - Vilnius Uprising (1794)
  - June 6 - Battle of Szczekociny
  - June 8 - Battle of Chełm
  - July 13 - September 6 - Siege of Warsaw (1794)
  - September 19 - Battle of Brest (1794)
  - October 10 - Battle of Maciejowice
  - November 4 - Battle of Praga
- Kharitonov Palace commissioned
- Korenovsk founded
- Kushchyovskaya founded
- Odessa founded
- Ust-Labinsk founded
- Vilna Governorate-General created

== Births ==
- Abbasgulu Bakikhanov (1794-1847) - Azerbaijani writer, historian, poet, and linguist; Russian military officer
- Pyotr Chaadayev (1794-1856) - philosopher
- Nikolai Borisovich Galitzin (1794-1866) - nobleman who commissioned three string quartets from Beethoven
- Gavriil Antonovich Katakazi (1794-1867) - diplomat and government official
- Nikolay Muravyov-Karsky (1794-1866) - general
- Ivan Kupreyanov (1794-1857) - naval officer and head of the Russian-American Company 1835-1840
- Alexander Petrov (1794-1867) - chess player and writer
- August Georg Wilhelm Pezold (1794-1859) - Estonian painter and lithographer
- Ivan Mikhailovich Simonov (1794-1855) - astronomer and geodesist
- Sergei Grigoryevich Stroganov (1794-1882) - nobleman, statesman, art historian, archaeologist, philanthropist
- Nikolai Sukhozanet (1794-1871) - general and statesman
- Artemy Tereshchenko (1794-1873) - businessman
- Konstantin Thon (1794-1881) - architect
- Alexander Ulybyshev (1794-1858) - diplomat and musicologist, biographer of Mozart
- Ivan Vitali (1794-1855) - sculptor
- Matvei Wielhorski (1794-1866) - Polish-Russian cellist

== Deaths ==
- Gregory Skovoroda (1722-1794) - philosopher, poet, composer
- Ivan Yelagin (1725-1794) - historian, freemason, secretary to Catherine the Great
- Vasily Zuyev (1754-1794) - naturalist and traveler
