= 1744 in Russia =

- Decades: 1720s; 1730s; 1740s; 1750s; 1760s
- See also: History of Russia; Timeline of Russian history; List of years in Russia

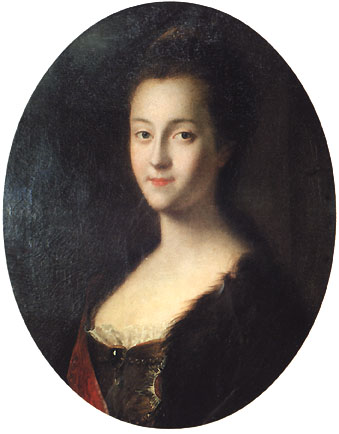
Young Catherine soon after her arrival in Russia, by Louis Caravaque

Events from the year 1744 in Russia

== Incumbents ==
- Monarch – Elizabeth

== Events ==
- 6 June - French agent Jacques-Joachim Trotti, marquis de la Chétardie is ordered to leave Russia within 24 hours by Empress Elizabeth, following intrigues against Alexey Bestuzhev.
- 15 June - Alexey Bestuzhev is appointed Grand Chancellor of the Russian Empire, consolidating control over Russian foreign policy.
- 28 June - The future Catherine the Great, Princess Sophia of Anhalt-Zerbst, fiancée of Peter III, the heir to the throne of Russia, converts to the Russian Orthodox Church and is received with the new name Catherine (Yekaterina or Ekaterina) and the (artificial) patronymic Алексеевна (Alekseyevna, daughter of Aleksey).

=== Undated ===
- Administrative divisions of Russia: The Vyborg Governorate is formed on parts of Finland and St. Petersburg Governorate, and Orenburg Governorate is created from Siberian and Astrakhan lands.

== Births ==
- Elena von Rehbinder, industrialist
