= 1747 in Russia =

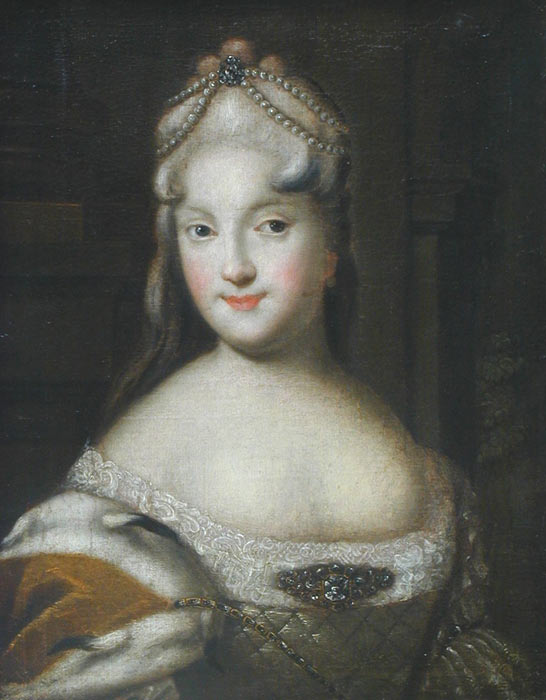
Ekaterina Alekseyevna Dolgorukova

Events from the year 1747 in Russia

== Incumbents ==
- Monarch – Elizabeth

== Events ==
- Engels, Saratov Oblast
- Convention of Saint Petersburg
- Smolensky Lutheran Cemetery Established.

== Births ==
- 17 January [O.S 6 January] — Arkady Morkov, (d. 1827)
- 14 February [O.S 3 February] — Alexander Andreyevich Baranov, (d. 1819)
- 25 March [O.S 14 March] — Alexander Bezborodko, (d. 1799)
- 1747 — Grigory Shelikhov, (d. 1795)

== Deaths ==
- Ekaterina Alekseyevna Dolgorukova
