= 1881 in Russia =

- Decades: 1860s; 1870s; 1880s; 1890s; 1900s
- See also: History of Russia; Timeline of Russian history; List of years in Russia

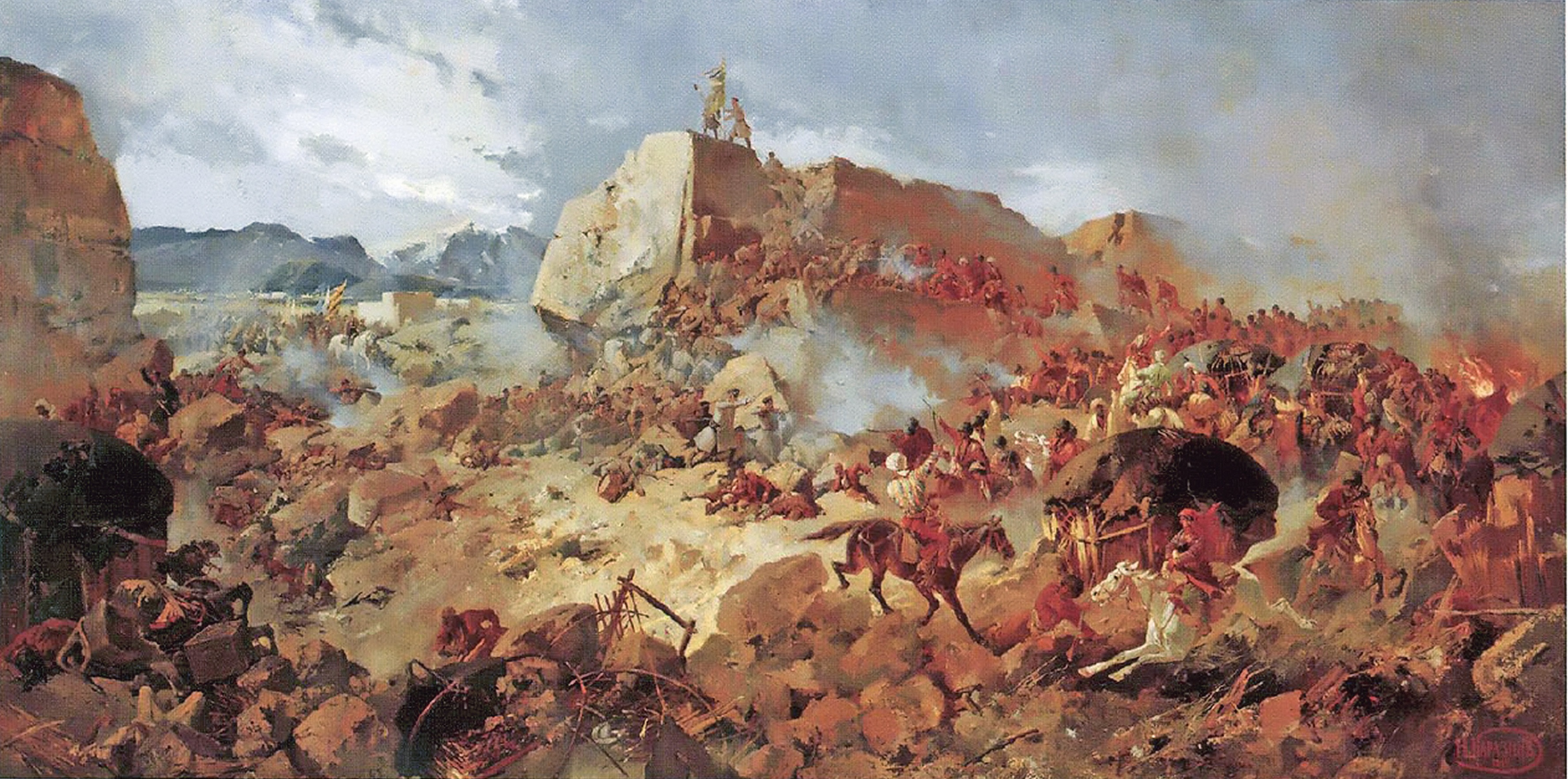
Siege of Geok Tepe

Events from the year 1881 in Russia.

== Incumbents ==
- Monarch – Alexander II (until March 13), Alexander III (after March 13)

== Events ==
- January 1–January 24 – Siege of Geok Tepe: the Turkomans is defeated by Russian troops under General Mikhail Skobelev.
- March 13 – Emperor Alexander II is killed by a bomb near his palace, an act falsely blamed upon Russian Jews. He is succeeded by his son, Alexander III.
- April 15 – Antisemitic pogroms in Southern Russia.
- September 21 – The Treaty of Akhal is signed.
- December 25–December 27 – Warsaw pogrom, Vistula Land, Russian Empire

=== Undated ===
- Polish–Lithuanian Social Revolutionary Party is founded.

== Births ==
- 4 February – Kliment Voroshilov, Russian military officer, politician (d. 1969)
- 12 February – Anna Pavlova, Russian prima ballerina. (d. 1931)
- 25 February – Alexei Rykov, Premier of Russia and Premier of the Soviet Union (d. 1938)
- 4 May – Alexander Kerensky, Russian politician (d. 1970)
- 16 October – Alexey Schastny, Russian naval officer (d. 1918)
- 14 November – Nicholas Schenck, Russian-born American film studio executive (d. 1969)

== Deaths ==
- 25 January – Konstantin Thon, Russian architect (b. 1794)
- 2 February – Aleksey Pisemsky, Russian novelist and playwright. (b. 1821)
- 9 February – Fyodor Dostoyevsky, Russian novelist, short story writer, essayist, journalist and philosopher. (b. 1821)
- 13 March – Alexander II of Russia, Czar of Russia. (b. 1818)
- 23 March – Nikolay Rubinstein, Russian composer and conductor . (b. 1835)
- 28 March – Modest Mussorgsky, Russian composer. (b. 1839)
- 3 April – Timofey Mikhailov, Russian revolutionary. (b. 1860)
- 15 April –Nikolai Rysakov, Russian revolutionary, involved of the assassination of Czar Alexander II. (b. 1861)
- 5 December – Nikolay Pirogov, Russian scientist and doctor (b. 1810)
