= 1802 in Russia =

Elisabeth Stroganoff, comtesse Demidoff

Events from the year 1802 in Russia

== Incumbents ==
- Monarch – Alexander I

== Establishments ==
- Manifesto on the Establishment of Ministries, which established:
  - Ministry of Finance of the Russian Empire
  - Ministry of Justice of the Russian Empire
  - Ministry of National Education (Russian Empire)
  - Ministry of War of the Russian Empire
- Tartu University Library
- Imperial Philanthropic Society
- Moscow School of the Order of St Catherine
- Caucasus Governorate
- Chernigov Governorate
- Kherson Governorate
- Poltava Governorate
- Taurida Governorate
- Vitebsk Governorate
- Yekaterinoslav Governorate

== Births ==
- Aharon of Karlin (II), Hasidic rabbi (d. 1872)
- Irakly Baratynsky, general and statesman (d. 1859)
- Alexey Buturlin, soldier and statesman (d. 1863)
- Grigory Chernetsov, painter (d. 1865)
- Konstantin Chevkin, general, Minister of Transport 1855-1862 (d. 1875)
- Boris Chorikov, artist and illustrator (d. 1866)
- Praskovya Alexandrovna Hendrikova, noblewoman and court figure (d. 1843)
- Alexander Kasimovich Kazembek, Azerbaijani historian, orientalist, and philologist (d. 1870)
- Alexandra Kolosova, actor and writer (d. 1880)
- Ivan Krasnov, general and writer (d. 1871)
- Nikolai Kristofari, helped create Russian banking system (d. 1881)
- Nikifor Krylov, painter (d. 1831)
- Nikolai Lavrov, opera singer (d. 1840)
- Alexey Tarasovich Markov, painter and academic (d. 1878)
- Pavel Nakhimov, admiral and war hero (d. 1855)
- Jacob Netsvetov, Orthodox missionary in Alaska (d. 1864)
- Alexander Odoevsky, poet, playwright, Decembrist (d. 1839)
- Alexander Orbeliani, Georgian poet and journalist (d. 1869)
- Mikhail Tebenkov, vice admiral, hydrographer (d. 1872)
- Yegor Tolstoy, general, governor, and senator (d. 1874)
- Mikhail Yuzefovich, educator known for efforts to suppress Ukrainian (d. 1889)

== Deaths ==
- Franz Aepinus, German mathematician and scientist (b. 1724)
- Ivan Argunov, painter (b. 1729)
- Mikhail Kozlovsky, sculptor (b. 1753)
- Ivan Lepyokhin, naturalist, zoologist, botanist and explorer (b. 1740)
- Alexander Radishchev, writer and social critic (b. 1749)
- Darya Petrovna Saltykova, noblewoman and court figure (b. 1739)
