= 1798 in Russia =

Events from the year 1798 in Russia

== Incumbents ==
- Monarch – Paul I

== Events ==
- War of the Second Coalition
  - Siege of Corfu (1798–1799)
- S.M. Kirov Military Medical Academy founded
- Ostankino Palace completed

== Births ==
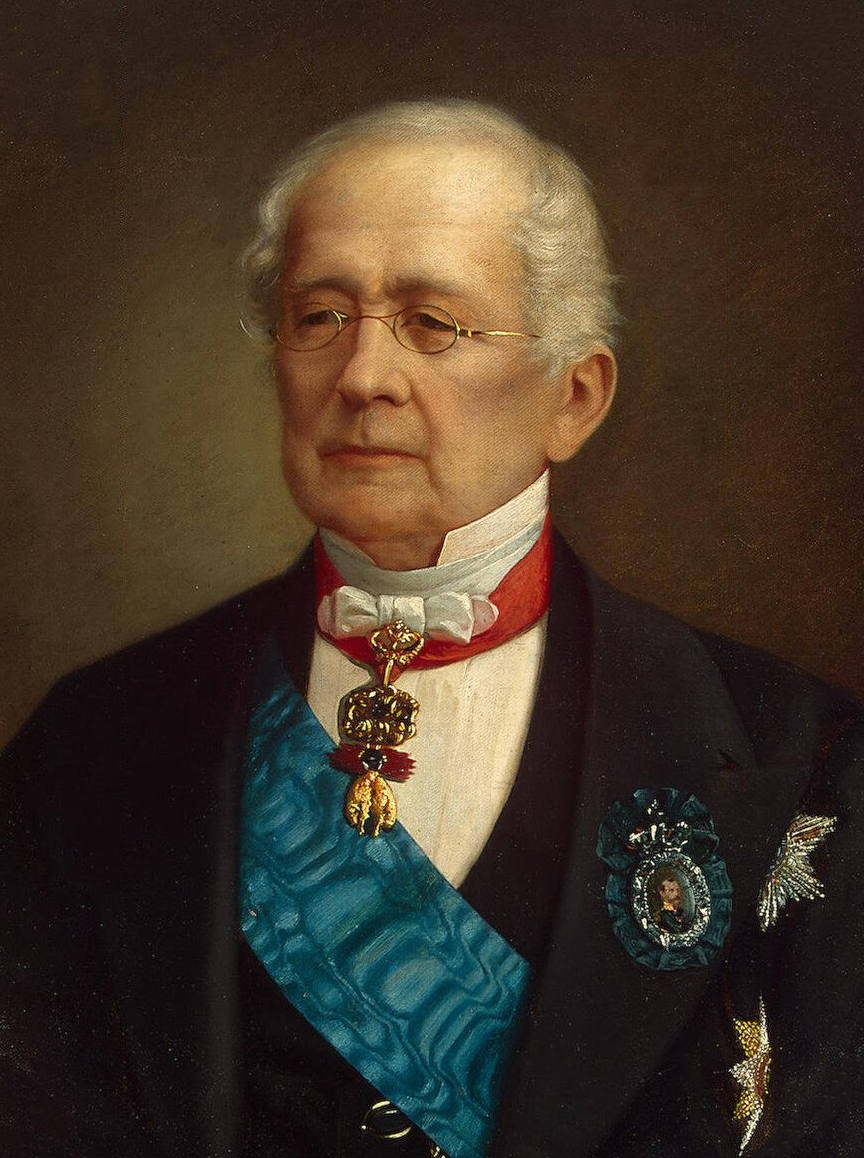
Prince Gorchakov (1867) by Johann Köler

- Ivane Andronikashvili (died 1868), Georgian prince, Russian general
- Łukasz Baraniecki (died 1858), Archbishop of Lviv
- Alexander Brullov (died 1877), painter
- Alexandra Feodorovna (Charlotte of Prussia) (died 1860), Empress of Russia, wife of Emperor Nicholas I
- Anton Delvig (died 1831), poet and journalist
- Pavel Nikolaievich Demidov (died 1840), nobleman, philanthropist and industrialist
- Alexander Gorchakov (died 1883), diplomat and statesman
- Anton Legashov (died 1865), painter
- Iulian Liublinskii (died 1876), nobleman and Decembrist
- Alexei Lvov (died 1870), composer
- Grand Duke Michael Pavlovich of Russia (died 1849), archduke, military commander
- Elisei Morozov (died 1868), businessman of the Morozovs dynasty
- Nikolay Protasov (died 1855), general, attorney-general of the Most Holy Synod
- Ivan Pushchin (died 1859), Decembrist and friend of Alexander Pushkin
- Valerian Safonovich (died 1867), governor of Oryol 1854-1861
- Joseph Semashko (died 1868), archbishop
- Sofya Shcherbatova (died 1885), philanthropist
- Ivan Sherwood Verny (died 1867), army officer who helped reveal the Decembrists
- Menucha Rochel Slonim (died 1888), Rebbetzin, matriarch of the Chabad dynasty, emigrant to Hebron
- Ana Gruzinskaya Tolstaya (died 1889), noblewoman

== Deaths ==
- Peter Bielański (born 1736), bishop of the Ukrainian Catholic Archeparchy of Lviv
- Vladimir Borisovich Golitsyn (born 1731), nobleman and soldier
- Gabriel Lenkiewicz (born 1722), priest, Temporary Vicar General of the Society of Jesus 1785-1798
