= 1878 in Russia =

- Decades: 1850s; 1860s; 1870s; 1880s; 1890s
- See also: History of Russia; Timeline of Russian history; List of years in Russia

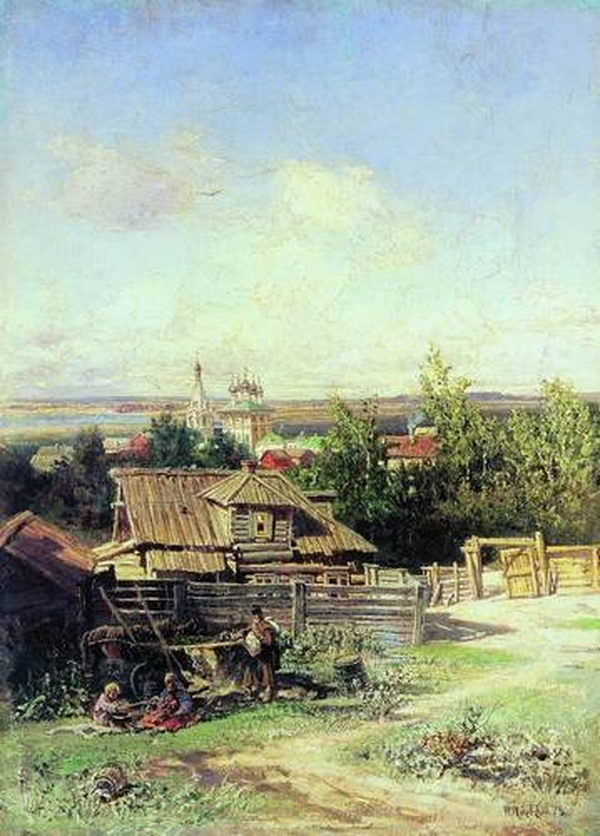
Nikolay Makovsky vid na Volge

Events from the year 1878 in Russia.

== Incumbents ==
- Monarch – Alexander II

== Events ==
- Treaty of Berlin (1878)
- Bestuzhev Courses
- Kars Oblast
- Stieglitz Museum of Applied Arts
- Russo-Turkish War
- Treaty of San Stefano
- Vera Zasulich attempts to assassinate Fyodor Trepov (senior)

== Births ==
- Joseph Stalin, Soviet statesman.
