= Nikolay Gnedich =

Russian poet and translator

Nikolay Ivanovich Gnedich
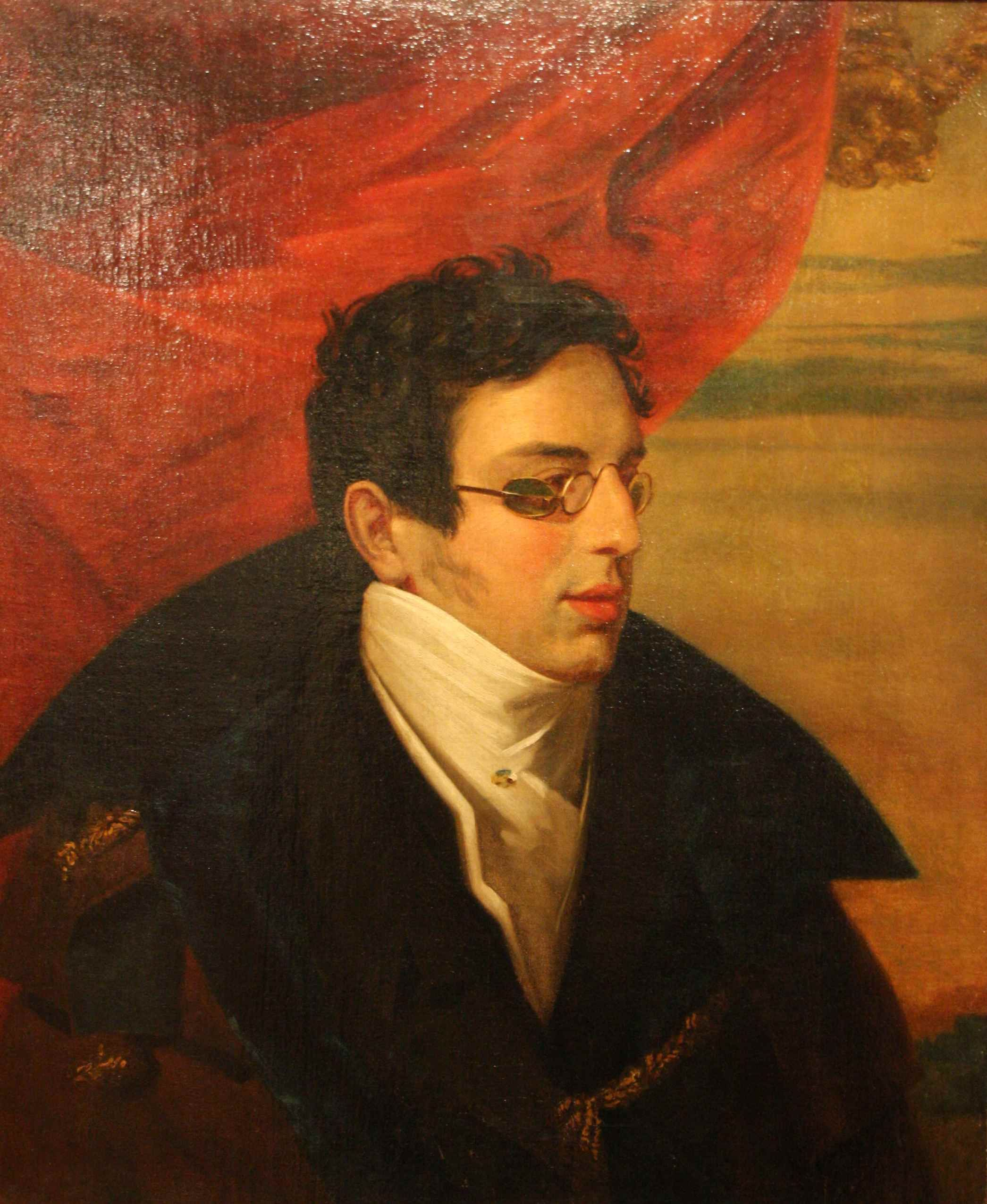
- Portrait by Orest Kiprensky (1826–1828)
- Born: 13 February 1784; Poltava, Russian Empire
- Died: 15 February 1833 (aged 49); Saint Petersburg, Russian Empire
- Education: Imperial Moscow University (1802)

Nikolay Ivanovich Gnedich (Russian: Никола́й Ива́нович Гне́дич, IPA: [nʲɪkɐˈlaj ɪˈvanəvʲɪdʑ ˈɡnʲedʲɪtɕ]; 13 February [O.S. 2 February] 1784 – 15 February [O.S. 3 February] 1833) was a Ukrainian-born Russian poet and translator best known for his translation of the Iliad (1807–29), which is still the standard one. He also wrote Don Corrado de Gerrera (1803), which has been called the first Russian Gothic novel.

== Biography ==
Nikolay Ivanovich Gnedich was born in Poltava in 1784 into a noble Zaporizhian Cossack family of modest means. He contracted smallpox as a child, which scarred his face and caused him to lose his right eye. He studied at the Poltava Theological Seminary and Kharkov Collegium before attending the boarding school for nobles attached to Moscow University. He was a student at Moscow University from 1800 to 1802. He became close to the literary club known as the Friendly Literary Society. Gnedich became interested in liberal and republican ideas and read the early works of Friedrich Schiller. His first literary work, a story titled "Morits, ili Zhertva mshcheniya" (Moritz, or the Victim of Vengeance), was published in 1802. In 1803, his translation of Schiller's tragedy Fiesco and his Gothic novel Don Corrado de Gerrera were published. The latter work has been called the first Russian Gothic novel. He moved to Saint Petersburg in 1803, where he served in the Department of Public Education as a scribe. He associated with the Free Society of Lovers of Literature, Science and Arts and became acquainted with Ivan Krylov and Konstantin Batyushkov; the latter became Gnedich's closest friend. He attended Alexey Olenin's literary salon, which was the center of Russian classicism and Hellenism. In the following years, he wrote the philosophical meditation on freedom "Obshchezhitiye" (Hostel, 1804), a free translation of an ode by Antoine-Léonard Thomas, and the poem "Peruanets k ispantsu" (The Peruvian to the Spaniard, 1805), which expressed opposition to serfdom. In 1808 he published a translation of Jean-François Ducis's adaptation of Shakespeare's King Lear. He also translated the tragedy Tancred by Voltaire in 1810. Gnedich favored heroic poetry written in a high style. Correspondingly, he associated with the literary group called Colloquy of Lovers of the Russian Word (although he was not a formal member), which shared his literary views.

On 12 April 1811, Gnedich became the assistant librarian of the Imperial Public Library. He was in charge of the library's collection of Greek books and created a catalog for the collection. He familiarized himself with Ancient Greek literature in the original. He had already begun translating Homer's Iliad in 1807, continuing the work of Ermil Kostrov. (Note: Kostrov translated the first six books of the Iliad in Alexandrine verse in 1787. Partial prose translations of the Iliad were made by Pyotr Yekimov in 1776 and by Ivan Martinov at the beginning of the nineteenth century.) Gnedich translated the work in Alexandrine verse (paired couples of iambic hexameter). Later, however, he switched to Russian hexameter (dactylo-trochaic meter). In 1809, he received a pension from Grand Duchess Yekaterina Pavlovna to complete the translation, which gave him a degree of financial independence. He published fragments of his translation in various periodicals and engaged in debates about the meter used to translate the Greek epic. The translation was finally completed in 1826 and was published in two volumes in 1829. In a speech given in 1814 at the opening of the Public Library for readers, Gnedich expressed his view that writers should take the Ancient Greeks as their direct model, rather than follow the conventions of French classicism. He wrote two poems on Homeric themes, "Setovaniye Fetidy na grobe Akhillesa" (The lamentation of Thetis on the tomb of Achilles, 1815) and "Rozhdeniye Gomera" (The birth of Homer, 1816). In the idyll "Rybaki" (The Fishermen, 1822) and his translations of modern Greek folk songs, Gnedich sought a combination of Homeric style and Russian folklore.

Gnedich's liberal views and his translation of Homer earned him the admiration of many younger Russian poets. Alexander Pushkin called Gnedich’s translation of the Iliad one of the few works that Russian literature "can proudly display before Europe." Pushkin assessed Gnedich's Iliad as "a noble exploit worthy of Achilles" and addressed to him an epistle starting with lines "With Homer you conversed alone for days and nights..." Pushkin also penned an epigram in Homeric hexameters, which unfavourably compares one-eyed Gnedich with the blind Greek poet:

Крив был Гнедич-поэт, преложитель слепого Гомера,

Боком одним с образцом схож и его перевод.

Translation:

Poet Gnedich, renderer of Homer the Blind,
Was himself one-eyed,
Likewise, his translation
Is only half like the original.

Gnedich wrote little after the Decembrist Uprising in 1825.
