= 1874 in Russia =

- Decades: 1850s; 1860s; 1870s; 1880s; 1890s
- See also: History of Russia; Timeline of Russian history; List of years in Russia

Events from the year 1874 in Russia

== Incumbents ==
- Monarch – Alexander II

== Events ==
- Jujevan
- Kiev Roshen Factory
- Odessa Russian Theatre

== Births ==
- January 28 – Vsevolod Meyerhold, Russian theatre practitioner (d. 1940)
- February 7 – Nikifor Begichev, Soviet seaman and explorer (d. 1927)
- February 26 – Nikolai Korotkov, Russian surgeon (d. 1920)
- May 17 – Mikhail Diterikhs, Russian general (d. 1937)
- July 26 – Serge Koussevitzky, Russian conductor (d. 1951)
- October 9 – Nicholas Roerich, Russian painter (d. 1947)
- December 13 – Josef Lhévinne, Russian pianist (d. 1944)
