= 1821 in Russia =

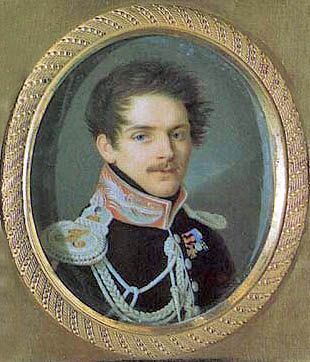
Stroganov (de Rossi)

Events from the year 1821 in Russia

== Incumbents ==
- Monarch – Alexander I

== Events ==
- Ukase of 1821
- Novo-kamenniy Bridge

== Births ==
- 23 February - Aleksey Zhemchuzhnikov, poet, dramatist, essayist and literary critic.
- 13 November [O.S. 1 November] 1821 - Mikhail Petrashevsky, Russian revolutionary and Utopian theorist. (d. 1866)
- 11 November [O.S. 30 October] 1821 - Fiódor Dostoievski, Russian novelist, short story writer, essayist, journalist and philosopher. (d. 1881)
