= 1882 in Russia =

- Decades: 1860s; 1870s; 1880s; 1890s; 1900s
- See also: History of Russia; Timeline of Russian history; List of years in Russia

Here are some events from the year 1882 in Russia.

== Incumbents ==
- Monarch – Alexander III

== Events ==
- Tcherny railway accident
- May Laws
- Pavlovka (meteorite)
- Peasants' Land Bank
- 1812 Overture

== Births ==
- January 4 – Aristarkh Lentulov, painter and set designer (died 1943)
- June 17 – Igor Stravinsky, composer, pianist, and conductor (died 1971)
- June 22 – Nikolai Cholodny, microbiologist (died 1953)

== Deaths ==
● 10 June [O.S. 29 May] Vasily Grigorevich perov – Russian painter, founding member of Peredvizhniki. (born 2 January 1834 [O.S. 21 December 1833])

- 20 August [O.S. 8 August] 1882 – Friedrich Benjamin von Lütke, Russian navigator, geographer, and Arctic explorer. (born 1797)
- 3 December [O.S. 21 November] 1882 – Sergei Nechaev Russian nihilist and anarcho-communist (born 1847)
