= 1880 in Russia =

- Decades: 1860s; 1870s; 1880s; 1890s; 1900s
- See also: History of Russia; Timeline of Russian history; List of years in Russia

Events from the year 1880 in Russia.

== Incumbents ==
- Monarch – Alexander II

== Events ==
- Sixth assassination of Alexander II
- The III Branch of the Imperial Chancellery was abolished
- Konstantin Petrovich Pobedonostsev was appointed to the post of Chief Prosecutor of the Holy Synod
- The assassination attempt by the People's Deputy I. O. Mlodetsky on M. T. Loris-Melkov
- Trial of the Sixteen (1880)
- Berdichev machine-building plant
- Moscow Circus on Tsvetnoy Boulevard

== Births ==
- July 28 – Volodymyr Vynnychenko, 1st Prime Minister of Ukraine (d. 1951)
- September 14 - Metropolitan Benjamin (Fedchenkov), Eastern Orthodox missionary and writer, Exarch of the Russian Church in North America (d. 1961)
- December 1 – Joseph Trumpeldor, Zionist activist (d. 1920)

== Deaths ==
- Death of Empress Maria Alexandrovna
