= 1877 in Russia =

- Decades: 1850s; 1860s; 1870s; 1880s; 1890s
- See also: History of Russia; Timeline of Russian history; List of years in Russia

Events from the year 1877 in Russia.

== Incumbents ==
- Monarch – Alexander II

== Events ==
- 3rd Army Corps (Russian Empire)
- Russo-Turkish War (1877–78)
- Budapest Convention of 1877
- Provisional Russian Administration in Bulgaria
- The Trial of the 50 (also called the Trial of the Muscovites)

== Births ==
- 18 January - Vladimir Gardin, film director and actor (d. 1965)
- 4 March - Alexander Fyodorovich Gedike, composer (d. 1957)
- 23 March - Felix Yusupov, prince, murderer of Grigori Rasputin (d. 1967)
- 14 August - Iosif Dubrovinsky, Boshevik revolutionary (d. 1913)

== Deaths ==
- Alexander Brullov
- Aleksandr Levitov
- Carl Timoleon von Neff
- Maxim Rudometkin
- Nikolai Stepanov
- Mikhail Stopanovsky
- Rayko Zhinzifov
