= Jehiel Heller =

Russian rabbi (1814 - 1861)

Personal life
- Born: 1814 Koidanov, Minsk Governorate, Russian Empire
- Died: 14 November 1861 (aged 46–47) Plungian, Kovno Governorate, Russian Empire

Religious life
- Religion: Judaism

Jehiel ben Aaron Heller (Hebrew: יחיאל בן אהרן העליר, romanized: Yeḥiʼel ben Aron Helir; 1814 – 14 November 1861) was a Russian rabbi.

== Biography ==
Heller was born in Koidanov, Minsk Governorate, a descendant of Rabbi Yom-Tov Lipmann Heller. As a child he was known as the "Illui of Koidanov."

He was successively rabbi at Glusk (1836–43), Volkovisk (1843–54), Suwalki, and Plungian (till his death). He delivered sermons in German on various notable occasions.

== Bibliography ==
- Shene Peraḳim leha-Rambam / Kevod Melekh. St. Petersburg. 1852. On patriotism. Translated into German and published for the government by Leon Mandelstamm.
- 'Ammude Or. Königsberg: T. Efrati. 1856. Responsa on the four parts of the Shulḥan 'Aruk.
- Ḳinah le-David. Königsberg. 1856. A funeral sermon on Rabbi David Lurie (Bichover), published as an appendix to the latter's Ḳadmut Sefer ha-Zohar.
- Or la-Yesharim. Königsberg: T. Efrati. 1857. Commentary on the Haggadah of Passover.
- 'Oteh Or. Memel. 1861. Commentary on the Song of Solomon.
