= Valerian Safonovich =

Russian politician

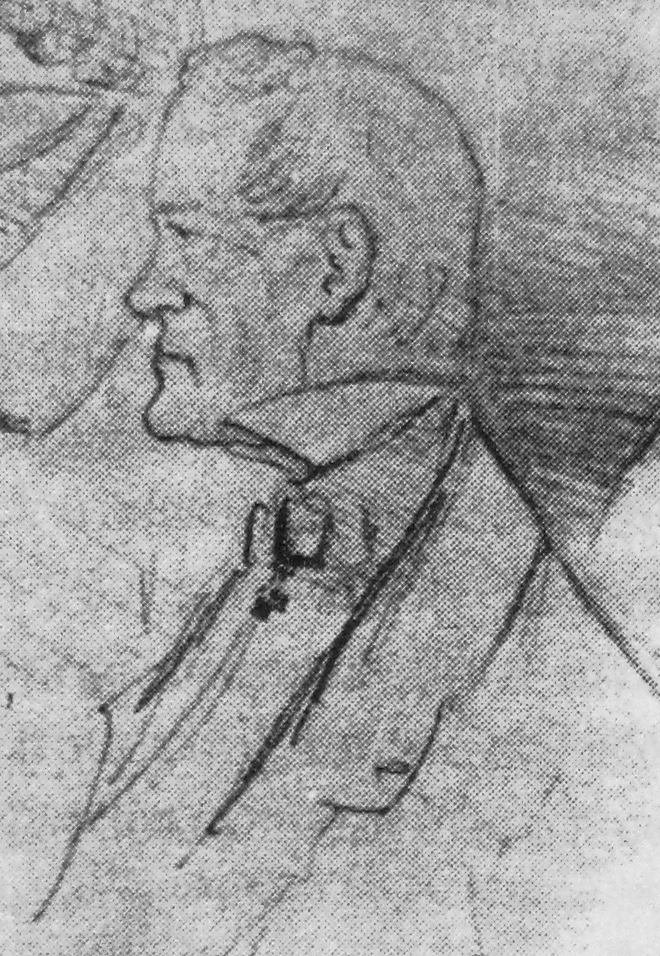

Governor of Oryol
- In office 6 March 1854 – 3 March 1861
- Monarchs: Nicholas I Alexander II

Personal details
- Born: 1798 Podolia Governorate, Russian Empire
- Died: 8 April 1867 Oryol, Russian Empire
- Spouse(s): 1) Polyxena Mosyagina; 2) Maria Gasparini

Valerian Ivanovich Safonovich (Russian: Валерья́н Ива́нович Сафоно́вич; 1798, Podolia Governorate — 8 April 1867, Oryol) — was a Russian statesman and politician who served as ruler of Oryol Governorate from 1854 to 1861.

Educated in Moscow University. Worked in the Ministry of the Interior in 1842—1854.

After Nikolay Krusenstern’s transmission from Oryol to Odessa in 1854, Safonovich was appointed ruler of Oryol Governorate (governor). In 1861 he retired from the service.

== Literature ==
- Иванова Л. В. Сатирическая поэма о Сафоновиче (аннотация) // Орловский гражданский губернатор В. И. Сафонович — Орёл: Издатель Александр Воробьёв, 2004. — С. 40—42. — 66 с. — (Золотая книга Орловщины) (in Russian)
