= Nikolay Mozgalevsky =

Nikolay Osipovich Mozgalevsky (Russian: Никола́й О́сипович Мозгалевский; May 1801, Saint Petersburg - June 14, 1844) was a Russian officer and a participant in the Decembrist revolt. His father was Osip F. Mozgalevsky, a landlord in Chernigov Governorate, his mother, Viktoriya Karlovna de Roset. He was educated from 1814 to 1821 in the First Corps of Cadets, from which issued an ensign in the Saratov Infantry Regiment. In 1825, he was promoted to a lieutenant in the same regiment. He became a member of the Society of United Slavs in 1825.

Nikolay Mozgalevsky was the one of 289 Decembrists. Pavel Pestel, Kondraty Ryleyev, Pyotr Kakhovsky, Mikhail Bestuzhev-Ryumin, Sergey Muravyov-Apostol were hung. 31 of them were put in prison. The rest of them were exiled to Siberia. They were forced to walk The Great Siberian Tract about 10,000 km.

Following the defeat of the revolutionists, Mozgalevsky was arrested on February 13, 1826. On February 21, he was taken from Zhitomir to St. Petersburg to be imprisoned in the Peter and Paul Fortress. He was sentenced to VII grade and sentenced to permanent exile. Link serving since 1826 in the town of Narym with Kuragino in Yeniseysk Governorate, transferred to Tesninskom and in 1839 to Minusinsk, where he died.

== Sights ==
- 1814-1821, First Cadet Corps (Congressional Line, 1-5, Universitetskaya nab, 11-15), studied on February 21-22, 1826
- Main guardhouse at the Imperial Winter Palace (Palace Embankment, 36), was in custody February 22-August 4, 1826
- Peter and Paul fortress, was in custody.
