= 1745 in Russia =

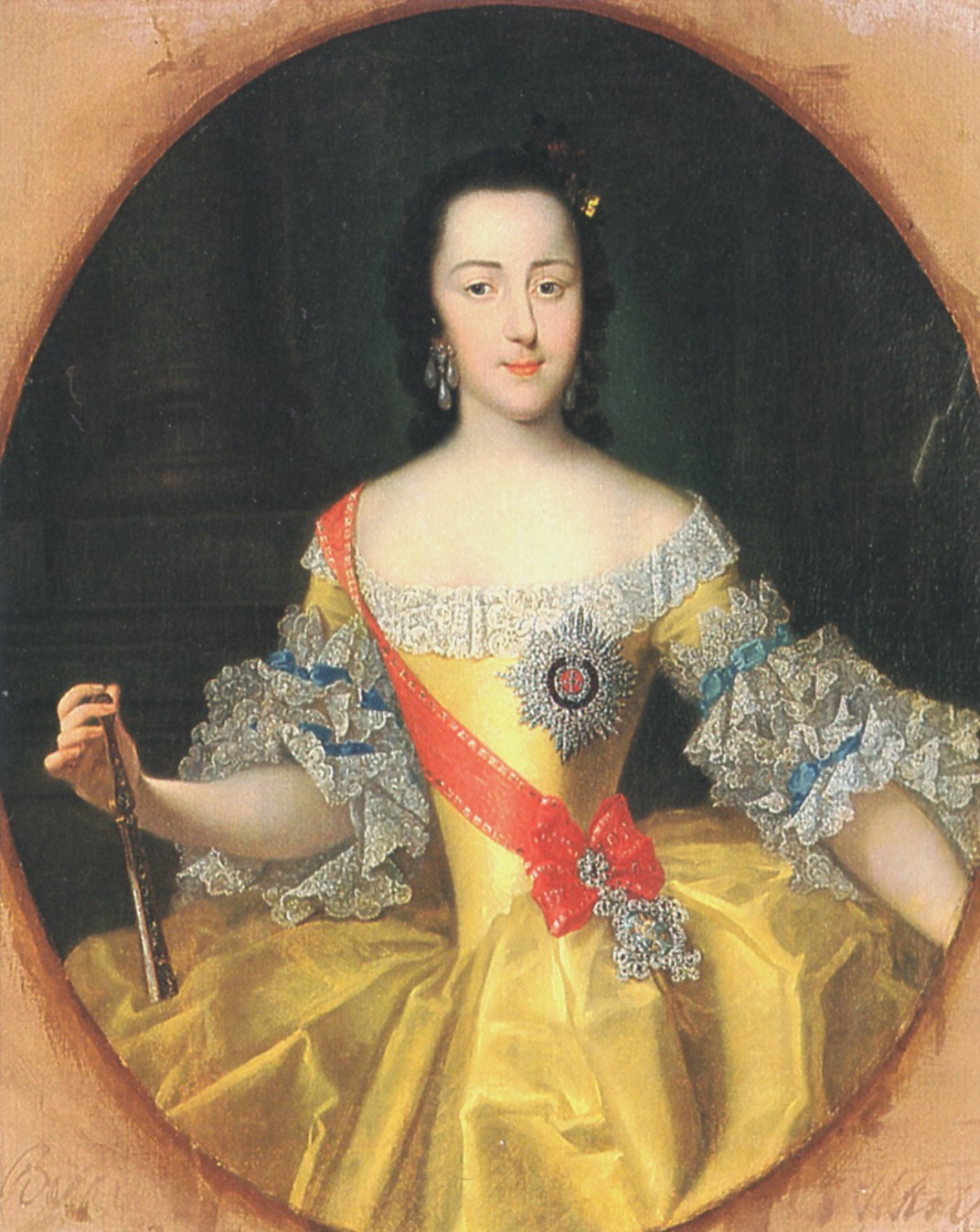
Portrait painting by Georg Christoph Grooth of Catherine around the time of her wedding

Events from the year 1745 in Russia

== Incumbents ==
- Monarch – Elizabeth

== Events ==
- continued involvement in the War of the Austrian Succession
- August 21 – Catherine the Great, and the heir to the throne, Peter III of Russia get married.
- September 13 - The first Atlas of Russia is published by the Russian Academy of Sciences

== Births ==
- February 24 – Fyodor Ushakov, a Saint and Admiral (d. 1817)
- September 4 – Schneur Zalman of Liadi, Rabbi and founder of Chabad (d. 1812)
- September 16 – Mikhail Illarionovich Kutuzov, Field marshal(d. 1813)
