= 1801 in Russia =

Events from the year 1801 in Russia

== Incumbents ==
- Monarch – Paul I (until 23 March), Alexander I (from 23 March)

== Events ==
- September 8 - Solar eclipse of September 8, 1801
- September 12 - Annexation of Kingdom of Kartli-Kakheti confirmed
- October 8 - Treaty of Paris ends Russian participation in the War of the Second Coalition
- Indian March of Paul - attempted Russian attack on British India
- Free Society of Lovers of Literature, Science, and the Arts founded
- Olonets Governorate
- Penza Governorate
- Caucasus Viceroyalty

== Births ==
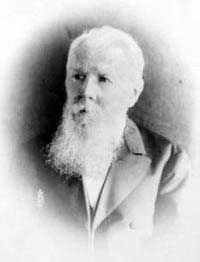
born 26 April 1801 - Fedor Solntsev, painter and art historian

- Mikhail Bestuzhev-Ryumin, Decembrist (d. 1826)
- Vladimir Dal, doctor, official, lexicographer and folklorist (d. 1872)
- Alexander Gagarin, general and nobleman (d. 1857)
- Alexander von Güldenstubbe, Baltic German general (d. 1884)
- Grigory Karelin, explorer, naturalist (d. 1872)
- Nikolay Mozgalevsky, Decembrist (d. 1844)
- Mikhail Ostrogradsky, mathematician and physicist (d. 1862)
- Viktor Nikitich Panin, Minister of Justice 1841-1862 (d. 1862)
- Ksenofont Polevoy, writer, critic, translator (d. 1867)
- Alexander Polyakov, artist (d. 1835)
- Alexander Postels, naturalist, mineralogist (d. 1871)
- Fedor Solntsev, painter and art historian (d. 1892)
- Adam Rzewuski, Polish-Russian general (d. 1888)
- Pavel Solomirsky, businessman (d. 1861)
- Aleksandr Varlamov, composer of art songs (d. 1848)
- Moritz von Jacobi, German Jewish physicist and inventor (d. 1872)

== Deaths ==
- Grand Duchess Alexandra Pavlovna of Russia, daughter of Paul I of Russia (b. 1783)
- Ivan Gannibal, general (b. 1735)
- Ivan Lazarevich Lazarev, Russo-Armenian banker (b. 1735)
- Vasily Petrovich Orlov, cavalry general, (b. 1745)
- Paul I of Russia, emperor (b. 1754)
- Nicholas Vasilyevich Repnin, statesman and general (b. 1734)
- Darya Nikolayevna Saltykova, sadist and murderer (b. 1730)
- Johann Hermann von Fersen, Saxon-born general (b. circa 1740)
