= Polish–Lithuanian Social Revolutionary Party =

The Polish–Lithuanian Social Revolutionary Party was a short-lived political party in the Russian empire. The party was founded in Saint Petersburg in 1881. It was the continuation of Gmina Polska ('Polish Commune'), a grouping formed by Polish students from Kiev, Moscow, Vilna and Saint Petersburg in 1880. The actions of party were led by a nucleus called Ognisko ('the Centre').
