= Ermil Kostrov =

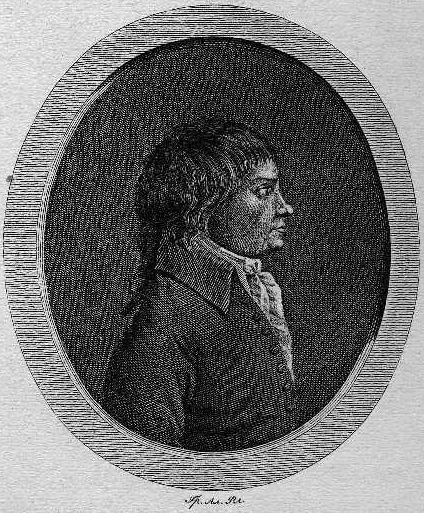
Portrait of Yermil Kostrov

Ermil or Yermil Ivanovich Kostrov (Russian: Ермил Иванович Костров; 17 January [O.S. 6 January] 1755 – 20 December [O.S. 9 December] 1796) was a Russian poet who first translated the Iliad (Books 1–9 only) into Russian. His father was a peasant from the Vyatka Governorate. Kostrov was educated in the Slavic Greek Latin Academy and received an annual pension from the Moscow University for odes and other poems he would write for special occasions. He lived in abject poverty and was prone to alcoholism. Apart from light verse and a book of odes, he also produced the first Russian translations of Ossian's poems and The Golden Ass.

== Early life and career ==
Yermil Ivanovich Kostrov was born on 17 January [O.S. 6 January] 1755 in Sineglinskoye, a village in the Vyatka Governorate. He was the third child of Ivan Vukolovich Kostrov, a peasant and sexton, and Yekaterina Artemyevna. Kostrov's native village was a small collection of six or seven farmsteads located in one of the poorest parts of Russia. His family were peasants who had come under state supervision following the confiscation of church lands. By virtue of his occupation, Yermil's father was literate, and he may have fostered an interest in reading and writing in his son. As a son of a clergymen, Yermil was able to study for free at a religious school. He began attending the Vyatka seminary in 1766 and showed talent as a student. After his father's death in 1773, Kostrov was removed from the seminary as a peasant's son. His father had been appointed sexton, not born into the clergy; it may be that his appointment was found illegitimate by the bureaucracy, or that after his death his family lost its status as the family of a clergyman.

Intent on continuing his education, Kostrov composed a request in verse to his relative Archimandrite Ioann Cherepanov, who was a member of the synod and a former student and teacher at the Vyatka seminary. These are the first known verses by Kostrov; they were later published by the Moscow University press in 1773. Kostrov's appeal was successful, and he was able to attend, albeit unofficially, the Slavic Greek Latin Academy in Moscow, the highest ecclesiastical school in Russia. He attended lectures on philosophy and theology. In September 1775, he petitioned the synod to be allowed to join the clergy and complete his education at the academy. Archbishop Platon of Moscow, the director of the academy, supported the petition and described Kostrov as an honest and successful student with a gift for theology. His petition was approved in March 1776. Not long after this, Kostrov transferred to Moscow University, opting for a secular education. During university celebrations, he recited an ode to the newborn prince Alexander, the future emperor.

Kostrov studied Greek and Latin philology with Christian F. Mattei, a well-known classical scholar. In 1780–1781, he completed a translation of Apuleius's The Golden Ass. He showed a remarkable knowledge of classical literature in the substantial notes to the translation. He soon received a bachelor's degree and was granted the position of poet in residence at the university. He was given the low rank of provincial secretary in the civil service in 1782, which he kept for the rest of his life. Kostrov was evidently dissatisfied with his lot in life, once telling an acquaintance, "a poet is born to sing, and not to teach ... I would not advise anyone to follow my path." He drank in excess and was irresponsible with money. A contemporary, Mikhail Dmitriyev, described Kostrov as "not very tall, a tiny little head, somewhat snub-nosed, his hair smoothed back, bent at the knees, not too steady on his feet." Although he was paid a salary by the university, he constantly lived in poverty as he wasted all of his money. In the last years of his life and perhaps earlier, he did not have a permanent place of residence, instead living with various patrons.

Kostrov wrote about twenty odes to the empress, Prince Grigory Potemkin, his patron Ivan Shuvalov, and others in the 1770s and 1780s. These were written according to the conventions of Russian classicism, in ten-line stanzas of iambic tetrameter and in a grandiose, archaicizing language. According to Altshuller, traces of the influence of Homer, Ossian and biblical poetry in Kostrov's odes display his awareness of the early Romantic approaches. Kostrov found this conventional form of writing tiresome. In a poem written in response to Gavrila Derzhavin's ode "Felitsa", he praised Derzhavin's innovations and criticized the ode as a genre.

== Translating the Iliad and Ossian ==
Kostrov is considered to have shown his real talent and originality in his translations, chiefly in his incomplete translation of Homer's Iliad (written 1780–1786). After some hesitation, Kostrov moved to Saint Petersburg at the invitation of his friends in early 1786. While there, he appears to have lived in Shuvalov's home. In 1787, Kostrov's translation of the first six books of the Iliad were published. While attempting to escape from classicist conventions, he decided to translate the Greek epic into Alexandrine verse (iambic hexameter, with rhymed couplets), the standard meter for heroic subjects in French classicism. He felt that he was not ready to use the Russian hexameter (dactylo-trochaic meter), developed earlier in the eighteenth century by Vasily Trediakovsky as the Russian counterpart to the Ancient Greek hexameter. In Altshuller's view, Kostrov's choice of meter "doomed Homer's epic to serious distortion, imbuing it with the spirit not of antiquity but of classicism." Despite this, Kostrov, with his adeptness in philology and ancient languages, made an effort to recreate the simplicity of the epic and not force it to correspond to classicist tastes. In this striving for authenticity and his use of archaic and Old Church Slavonic words to reflect the ancientness of the work, Kostrov moved in the direction of the Romantic ideas of national art.

Kostrov's translation of the Iliad was well received. Some contemporaries honored him as "the Russian Homer". The great interest in Greece and Hellenic culture at the time of the translation's publication increased the popularity of the work. Empress Catherine had designs on Ottoman territory and considered plans for the creation of a Greek state centered in Constantinople and ruled by her grandson. The publication of Kostrov's Iliad includes a dedication in verse to the empress, in which he compares her to Athena and foresees the liberation of the Greeks by Russian armies. Catherine personally ordered a reward of four hundred rubles to Kostrov for his translation, which the poet reportedly gave away.

Kostrov planned to publish the remaining books of the Iliad (twenty-four books in four volumes in total) and began work on the following six. His translations of the seventh, eighth and part of the ninth books were discovered after his death and published in the journal Vestnik Yevropy in 1811. (The discovery prompted Nikolai Gnedich to abandon his continuation of Kostrov's translation; later, he completed a new translation of the Iliad in Russian hexameter.) It is not clear why Kostrov discontinued his work on the translation of the Iliad and never published the planned second, third and fourth volumes. He may have been disappointed with his work, perhaps seeing the inability of Alexandrine verse to reflect his vision of the lliad as the Greek national epic. Instead, he began translating the works of Ossian, which were presented as the genuine poems of an antique Gaelic poet. In fact, the poems were the compositions of James Macpherson, who claimed to be the translator. Kostrov's translation of Ossian, made from a French version by Pierre Le Tourneur, was published in two volumes in 1792 under the title Galskie stikhotvoreniya (Gaelic poems). Like his version of the Iliad, Kostrov's translation of Ossian contains many Old Church Slavonic and archaic words. The result is a higher style than the English original, which, according to Altshuller, produces a "darkly romantic mood." Kostrov dedicated the translation to the general Alexander Suvorov, who read the translation every day and kept it with him while campaigning. Through Kostrov's translation, the poems of Ossian exerted great influence on Russian sentimentalist and pre-Romantic authors.

== Death and legacy ==
Kostrov produced no major works after his translation of Ossian. His health worsened because of his alcoholism. He suffered from delirium tremens and began to see terrifying visions. He died on 20 December [O.S. 9 December] 1796. His death elicited a strong public response. He was called the "immortal transcriber of Homer" and came to be associated with the Romantic image of an ingenious but impoverished artist. At the age of fifteen, Alexander Pushkin wrote a poem in which he mentioned Kostrov together with Luís de Camões, the Portuguese epic poet who likewise died in abject poverty. In 1853, the poet and playwright Nestor Kukolnik wrote a drama in verse about Kostrov. According to Mark Altshuller:

The personality of the poet played no less of a role in his posthumous fame. A simple-hearted man, gentle, talented, and completely indifferent to money, Kostrov was received by his contemporaries and immediate descendants as the embodiment of the romantic, unsettled, solitary poet. Stories of his poverty, early death, and even his frequent drunkenness lent a romantic aura to his name.

== Works ==
=== Books ===
- Stikhi Sviateishemu pravitel'stvuiushchago sinoda kontory chlenu, Novospasskago stavropigal'nago monastyria vysokoprepodomneishemu gospodinu ottsu arkhimandritu Ioannu, kotorye v chaianii milostivago blagoprizreniia i otecheskago miloserdiia k neshchastnym liubiteliam nauk derzaet prinest' Viatskoi seminarii uchenik, voblovitskoi ekonomicheskoi krest'ianin Ermil Kostrov ([Moscow]: Moskovskii universitet, 1773).
- Ego siiatel'stvu grafu Grigoriiu Aleksandrovichu Potemkinu ... svoe vseuserdneishee vozblagodarenie nizhaishe prinosit Moskovskaia slavenogrekolatinskaia akademiia, za okazanie k nei osoblivago blagovoleniia laskovym priniatiem i ugoshcheniem eia popechitelei ([Moscow]: Moskovskii universitet, 1775).
- Epistola Sviateishego pravitel'stvuiushchago sinoda chlenu, ikh imp. vysochestv v zakone uchiteliu velikomu gospodinu preosviashenneishemu arkhiepiskopu Moskovskomu i Kaluzhskomu i Sviatotroitskiia Sergievy Iavry sviashchennoarkhimandritu Platonu, kotoruiu vo vremia polucheniia ego preosviashchenstvom dragotsenneishiia mitry i panagii, predstavitel'stvom e. s. grafe Grigoriia Aleksandrovicha Potemkina ... ([Moscow]: Moskovskii universitet, 1775).
- Stikhi Sviateishego pravitel'stvuiushchago sinoda chlenu preosviashchenneishemu Platonu, arkhiepiskopu Moskovskomu i Kaluzhskomu i Sviatotroitskiia Sergievy Iavry sviashchennoarkhimandritu, protektoru i polnomu direktoru Moskovskoi slaveno-greko-latinskoi akademii, v znak ... vysokopochitaniia i glubochaishego userdiia ... v novyi 1776 god ([Moscow]: Moskovskii universitet, 1776).
- Oda na vozhdelennoe rozhdenie e. i. v. gosudaria velikago kniazia Aleksandra Pavlovicha ... (Moscow, 1778).
- Oda na vseradostnyi den' koronatsii e. i. v. Ekaterine II ... 1778 goda ([Moscow]: Moskovskii universitet, [1778]).
- Oda ego vysokoprevoskhoditel'stvo deistvitel'nomu tainomu sovetniku, eia imp. velichestva ober-kamergeru, raznykh ordenov kavaleru, Imp. Moskovskago universiteta kuratoru Ivanu Ivanovichu Shuvalovu. Na pribytie ego vysokoprevoskhoditel'stva iz S. Peterburga v Moskvu ([Moscow: Novikov], 1779).
- Oda na den' rozhdeniia ego prevoskhoditel'stva, deistvitel'nago statskago sovetnika, Imp. Moskovskago universiteta kuratora, Mikhaila Matveevicha Kheraskova ... Oktiabria 25 dnia, 1779 goda(Moscow: [Novikov, 1779]).
- Oda na den' rozhdeniia ego vysokoprevoskhoditel'stva deistvitel'nago tainago sovetnika, dvora eia imp. velichestva ober-kamergera ober-kamergera, Imp. Moskovskago universiteta kuratora ... Ivana Ivanovicha Shuvalova ... Noiabria 1 dnia, 1779 goda (Moscow: [Novikov, 1779]).
- Oda na vseradostnyi den' rozhdeniia ... imp. i samoderzhitsy vserossiiskiia Ekaterine II. Aprelia 21 dnia 1779 goda ([Moscow]: Moskovskii universitet, [1779]).
- Oda na vseradostnyi den' vosshestvie na vserossiiskii prestol e. i. v. ... Ekaterine II ... 1779 goda, iiunia 28 dnia ([Moscow]: Novikov, 1779]).
- Oda ego svetlosti, kniaziu Grigoriu Aleksandrovichu Potemkinu; podnesennaia iiunia 9 dnia, 1780 goda(Moscow: Novikov, [1780]).
- Oda na vseradostnyi den' rozhdeniia ... imp. i samoderzhitsy vserossiiskiia Ekaterine II i na prazdnestvo sovershivsheisia pervoi cherverti stoletiia ot uchrezhdeniia Imp. Moskovskago universiteta ... Aprelia 21 dnia, 1780 goda (Moscow: Novikov, 1780).
- Oda na vseradostnyi den' vosshestvie na vserossiiskii prestol e. i. v. ... Ekaterine II ... iiunia 28 dnia 1780 goda (Moscow: Novikov, 1780).
- Stikhi ego siiatel'stvu, grafu fon Falkensteinu, vo vremia ego poseshcheniia Imp. Moskovskago universiteta ([Moscow]: Novikov, 1780).
- Oda na vseradostnyi den' rozhdeniia ... imp. i samoderzhitsy vserossiiskiia Ekaterine II ... aprelia 21 dnia 1781 goda (Moscow: Novikov, [1781]).
- Oda na vyzdorovlenie ego vysokoprevoskhoditel'stva dvora eia imp. velichestva ober-kamergera, deistvitel'nogo tainago sovetnika, Imp. Moskovskago universiteta kuratora i raznykh ordenov kavalera Ivanu Ivanovichu Shuvalovu (Moscow: Novikov, 1781).
- Oda e. i. v. ... Ekaterine II na otkrytie gubernii v stolichnom grade Moskve ... Oktiabria 5 dnia, 1782 goda (Moscow: Novikov, [1782]).
- Oda na vysokotorzhestvennyi den' vosshestvie na prestol e. i. v. ... Ekaterine II ... iiunia 28 dnia, 1782 goda (Moscow: Novikov, 1782).
- Oda na vseradostnoe pribytie eia imp. velichestva v Moskvu 1785 goda, iiunia 3 dnia, ot Imp. Moskovskago universiteta eia velichestvu podnesennaia (Moscow: Novikov, 1785).
- Pesn' blagodarstvennaia e. i. v. Ekaterine II ... za okazannyia Moskve otlichnyia shchedroty v bytnost' eia velichestva v sei stolitse, chitannaia v publichnom sobranii Imp. Moskovskago universiteta v vysokotorzhestvennyi den' vozshestviia na prestol eia imp. velichestva, iiunia 28 dnia, 1785 goda(Moscow: Novikov, 1785).
- Epistola na vseradostnyi den' vozshestviia na prestol e. i. v. Ekateriny II. Iiunia 28, 1786 goda (Saint Petersburg: Shnor, 1786).
- Oda na den' torzhestvennago otkrytiia Obshchestva liubitelei uchenosti pri Imp. Moskovskogo universiteta, iiulia 2 dnia, 1789 goda (Moscow: A. Svetushkin, 1789).
- Epistola ego siiatel'stvu grafu Aleksandru Vasil'evichu Suvorovu Rymnikskomu (Saint Petersburg: [Bogdanovich], 1791).
- Epistola ego siiatel'stvu grafu Aleksandru Vasil'evichu Suvorovu-Rymnikskomu na vziatie Izmaila(Moscow: V. Okorokov, 1791).
- Stikhi na osviashchenie khrama v Imp. Moskovskago universiteta, podnesennye Sviateishego pravitel'stvuiushchago sinoda chlenu, velikomu gospodinu vysokopreosviashchenneishemu Platonu, mitropolitu Moskovskomu i Kaluzhskomu i Sviato-Troitskiia Sergievy Iavry sviashchenno-arkhimandritu, 1791 goda, aprelia 5 dnia (Moscow: V. Okorokov, 1791).
- Stikhi na konchinu ego prevoskhodiltel'stva, tainago sovetnika senatora Petra Vasil'evicha Khitrova, posledovavshuiu aprelia 17 dnia, 1793 goda (Moscow: V. Okorokov, 1793).
- Epistola ego siiatel'stvu general-fel'dmarshalu, grafu Aleksandru Vasil'evichu Suvorovu-Rymnikskomu, na vziatie Varshavy (Moscow: Ridiger & Klaudii, 1795).
- Stikhi na konchinu e. s. Fedora Grigor'evica Orlova, dvora eia imp. velichestva deistvitel'nago i raznykh ordenov kavalera. 1796 goda, maia 17 dnia (Moscow: Ridiger & Klaudii, [1796]).
- Stikhi na vysokotorzhestvennyi den' vozshestviia na prestol e. i. v. Ekaterine II ... 1796 goda, iiunia 28. (Moscow: Ridiger & Klaudii, [1796]).

=== Collected works ===
- Polnoe sobranie sochinenii i perevodov v stikhakh, 2 volumes (Saint Petersburg, 1802).
- Sochineniia (Saint Petersburg: A. Smirdin, 1849).

=== Translations ===
- François Thomas Marie de Baculard d'Arnaud, Poema El'vir' ... i Zenotemis, prikliuchenie marsel'skoe sochinenie (Moscow: N. Novikov, 1779).
- Lucius Apuleius, Prevrashchenie, ili Zolotoi osel, 2 volumes (Moscow: N. Novikov, 1780-1781).
- Homer, Iliada (Saint Petersburg: Shnor, 1787); continued in "Gomerovoi Iliady pesn' 7 i 8," Vestnik Evropy, 58, no. 14 (1811): 81-126; no. 15 (1811): 172-192.
- Ossian (James Macpherson), Gal'skie stikhotvoreniia, 2 volumes (Moscow: V. Okorokov, 1792).
