= 1876 in Russia =

- Decades: 1850s; 1860s; 1870s; 1880s; 1890s
- See also: History of Russia; Timeline of Russian history; List of years in Russia

Events from the year 1876 in Russia.

== Incumbents ==
- Monarch – Alexander II

== Events ==
- Pyotr Ilyich Tchaikovsky's patriotic Slavonic March makes its premiere in Moscow.
- Marche slave
- Saint Petersburg Art and Industry Academy
- Reichstadt Agreement
- Kazan demonstration
- The Khanate of Kokand was incorporated into the Russian Empire.
- April Uprising: Bulgarian nationalists attacked the Ottoman police headquarters in Oborishte.
- Tsar Alexander II signed the Ems Ukaz, banning the use of the Ukrainian language in print.

== Births ==
- Nikolay Dukhonin, White Army General, casualty of the Russian Civil War.
- Pyotr Konchalovsky, Russian painter.
- Georg Lurich, Estonian wrestler and strongman of the early 20th century, born in Väike-Maarja, Governorate of Estonia, Russian Empire.
- Ferdynand Antoni Ossendowski, Polish writer (Lenin: God of the Godless), born in Ludza, Russian Empire
- Maxim Litvinov [Meir Genoch Moiseyevich Wallach], Russian statesman, revolutionary and diplomat (People's Commissar for Foreign Affairs.1930-39, Soviet Ambassador to the US 1940-43), born in Białystok, Russian Empire
- Maria Ouspenskaya, Russian actress (The Wolf Man, Waterloo Bridge), born in Tula, Russian Empire
- Ivan Bilibin, Russian illustrator, born in Seppälä, Russia

== Deaths ==
- Mikhail Bakunin, Russian revolutionary anarchist, Died in Bern, Switzerland
- Alexander ll, Emperor of Russia assassinated in 1881
- Joseph V Stalin, Bolshevik party leader in 1953.
