= Iulian Liublinskii =

Polish noble and Decembrist (1798–1876)

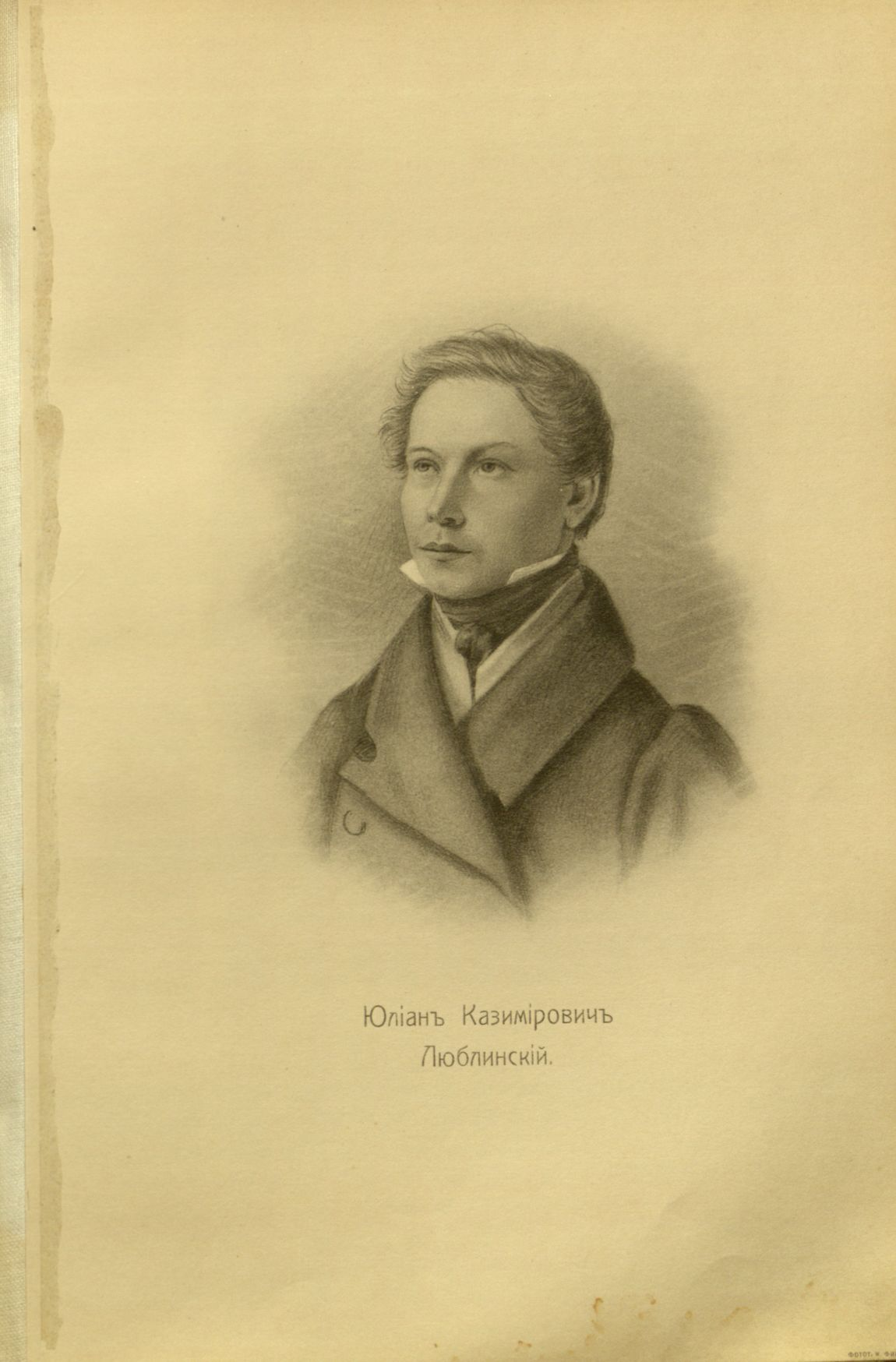
Iulian (Julian) K. Liublinskii

Iulian Liublinskii (6 November 1798, Zviahel – 26 August 1876, St. Petersburg) was a Polish born noble who later became a Slav nationalist and Decembrist. Prosecuted for his part in the Decembrist uprising he was jailed, and later exiled.

== Early life ==
Liublinskii was born in November 1798, in the village of Liublinets, near Novohrad-Volynskii. He was heir to a title and small estate. Liublinskii entered the University of Warsaw in 1819.

== Politics ==
During his studies he was banished to his home because of his ties with Polish revolutionaries. In 1823 he founded the Society of United Slavs with the brothers Peter and Andrei Borisov, and had a part in drawing up its revolutionary platform. Following the Decembrist uprising, in 1826 he was sentenced to three years hard labor at the Nerchinsk mines; he then lived at an exile settlement in Irkutsk Province. He returned to his home under the amnesty of 1856, and in 1872 he moved to St. Petersburg.

== Death ==
Liublinskii died in St. Petersburg in 1873.
