= 1879 in Russia =

- Decades: 1850s; 1860s; 1870s; 1880s; 1890s
- See also: History of Russia; Timeline of Russian history; List of years in Russia

Events from the year 1879 in Russia.

== Incumbents ==
- Monarch – Alexander II

== Events ==
- The Kharkov Mathematical Society is formed.

=== April ===
- 2 April – An assassination attempt is carried out against Emperor Alexander II in St. Petersburg by Alexander Soloviev, who shot four times from his gun at the Tsar, but failed to hit him.

=== August ===
- 15 August – The populist revolutionary organization Land and Liberty splits into two factions; the radical terrorist organisation Narodnaya Volya, and the more moderate Black Repartition.

=== December ===
- December - Members of the Narodynaya Volya group attempt to assassinate the Tsar by detonating an explosive device underneath a railway line, but the attack fails after he travels on a different train.

== Births ==
- 7 November – Leon Trotsky, Soviet statesman.

== Deaths ==
=== May ===
- May 28 – Alexander Soloviev, revolutionary who attempted to assassinate Tsar Alexander II, is hanged
