= Nikifor Krylov =

- Born: 1802; Kalyazin, Vyshnevolotsky Uyezd, Tver Governorate, Russian Empire
- Died: 1831 (aged 28–29)
- Patrons: Alexey Venetsianov

Nikifor Stepanovich Krylov (Russian: Никифор Степанович Крылов) was a Russian artist, portraitist and landscape painter.

== Biography ==
The artist was born in 1802 in a poor family of a Kalyazin bourgeois.

At the beginning of 1823, together with the artel, he painted the iconostasis in Terebeni Monastery, Vyshnevolotsky Uyezd, Tver Governorate, where he first met Alexey Venetsianov. In April 1824, he painted the iconostasis in the estate of A. P. Putyatin who lived next door to Venetsianov; in May, the artist again worked at the Terebeni Monastery and met Venetsianov again. At the request of Venetsianov, Krylov was accepted under the patronage of the Imperial Society for the Encouragement of the Arts.

In 1825–1827, he performed a number of genre compositions, which were presented at the exhibitions of the Society for the Encouragement of Arts. His painting The boy with a candle in his hands was purchased by P. P. Svinyin for the private Russian Museum.

In the summer of 1825, he came to Saint Petersburg and settled in Venetsianov's house, becoming one of his first students. In July of this year, he was allowed to attend drawing classes at the Imperial Academy of Arts. He painted a picture View of the front garden at the apartment of Venetsianov which was acquired by Empress Elizaveta Alexeievna.

In 1827, Krylov was awarded a small gold medal of the Society for the Encouragement of the Arts for his work Winter and for his portraits, which were exhibited at the Academy of Arts.

The painter died in a cholera epidemic in 1831.

== Gallery ==
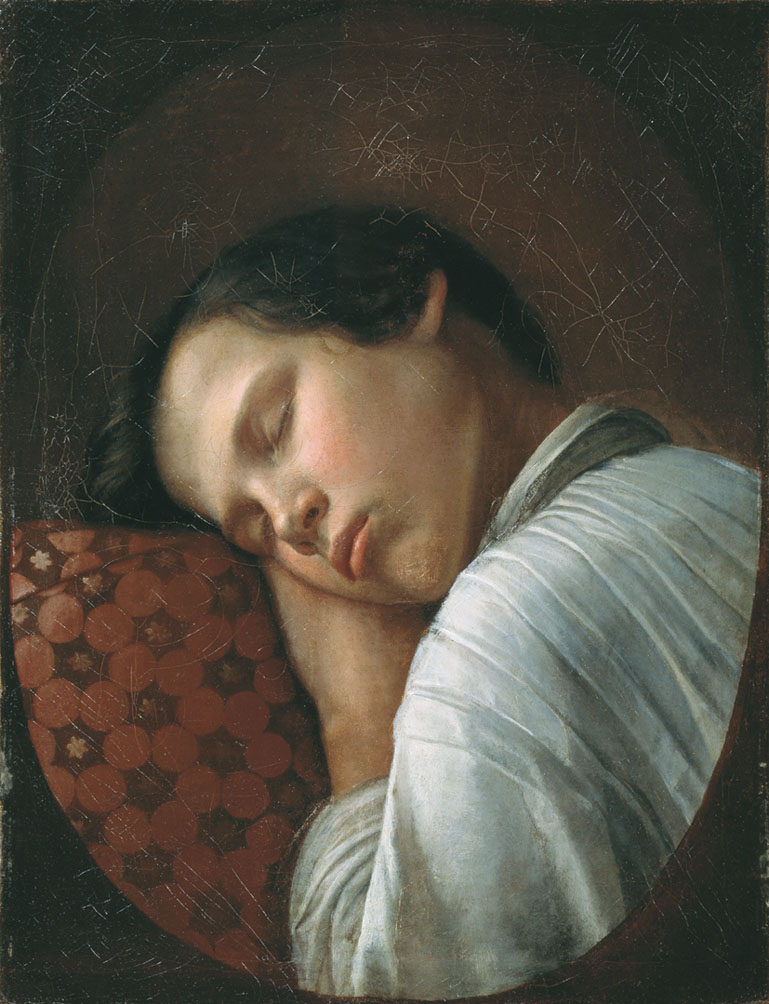

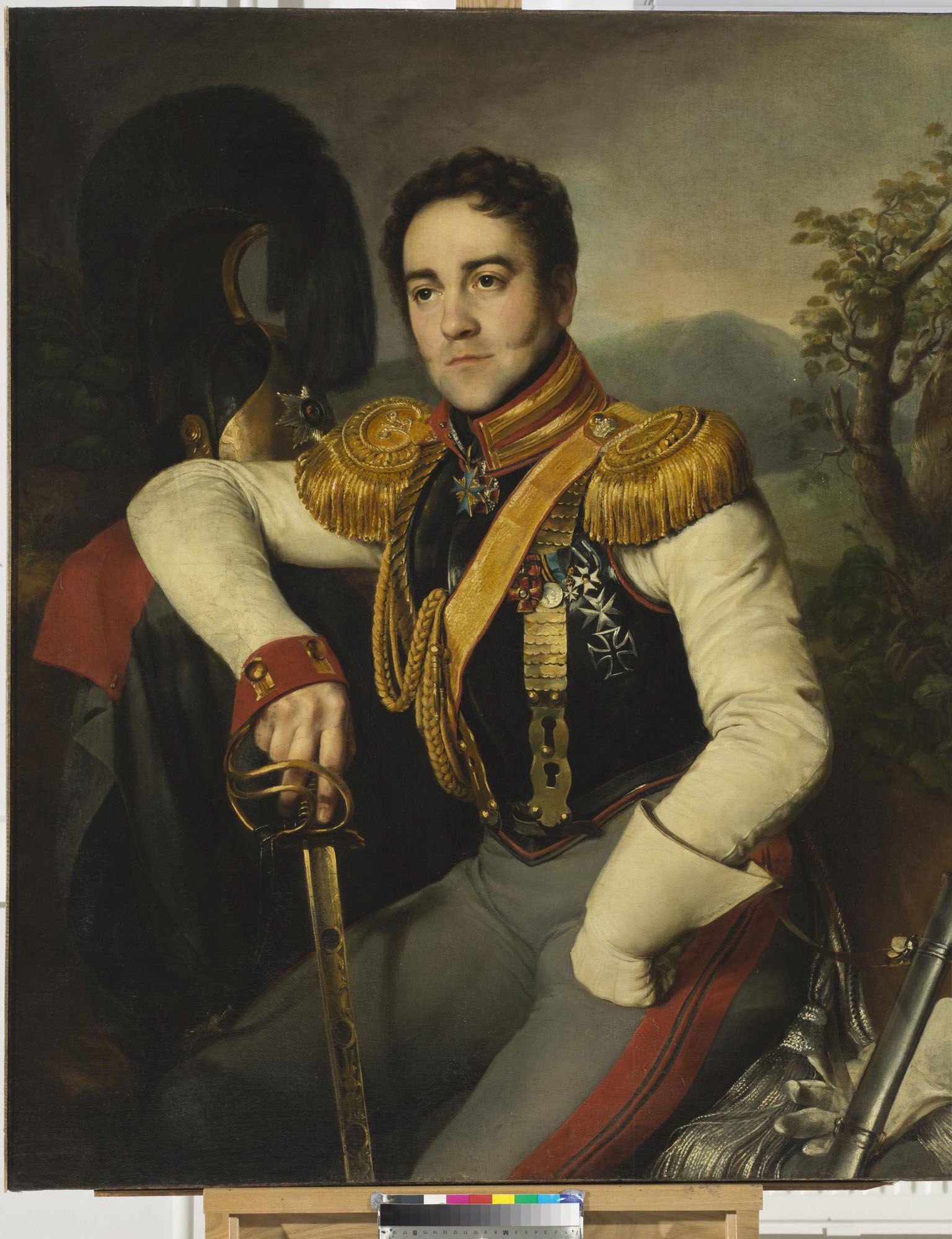

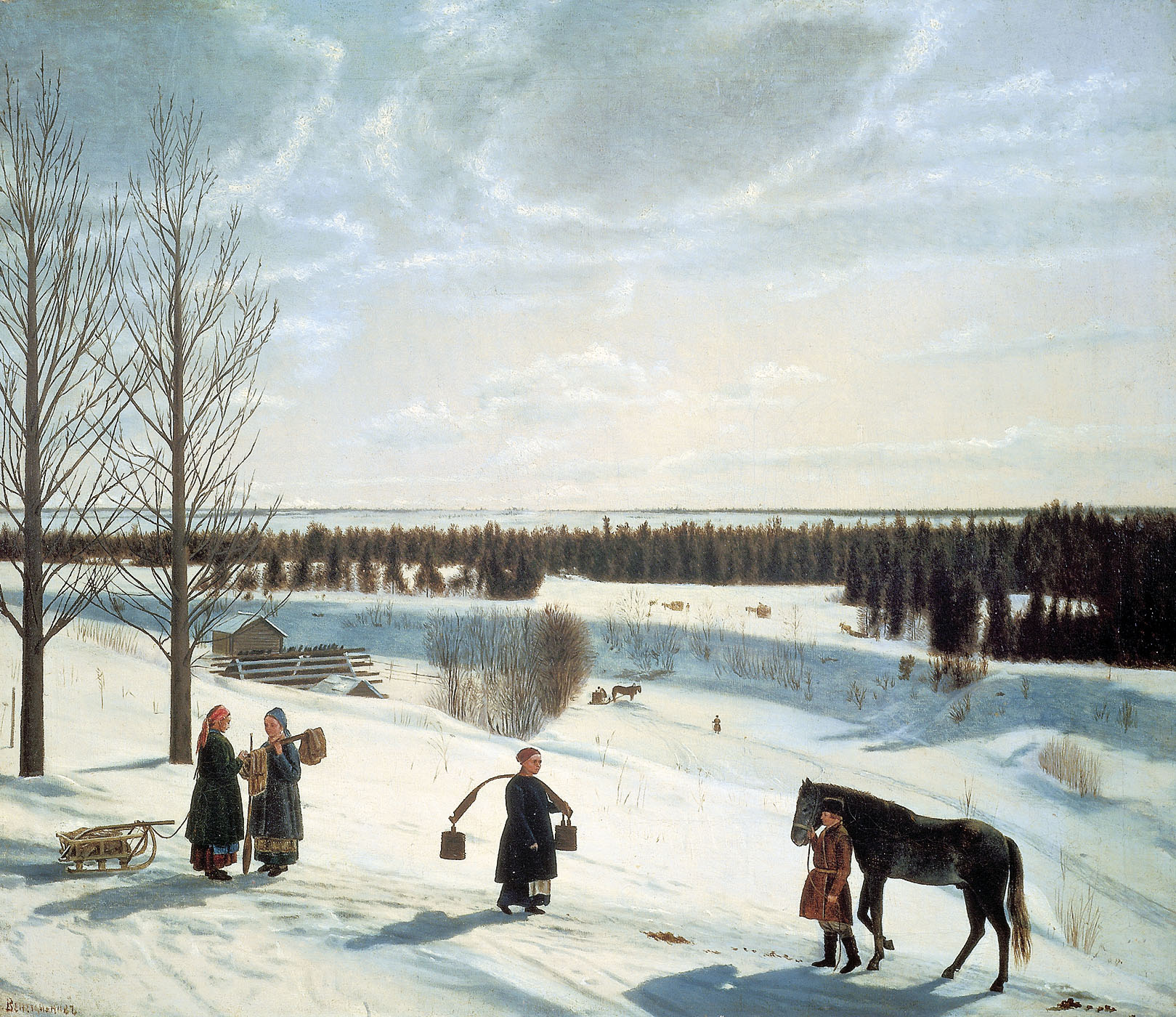

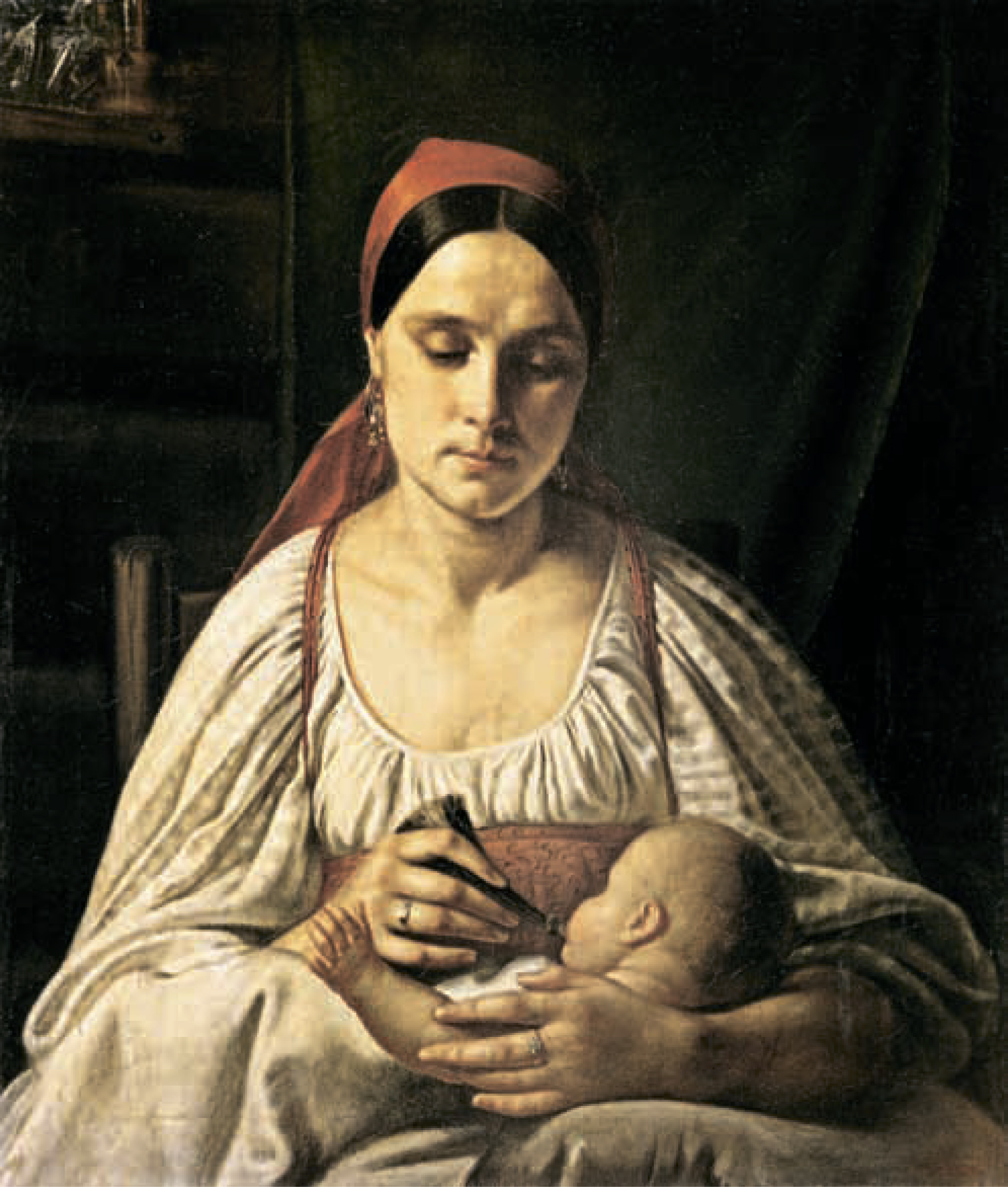

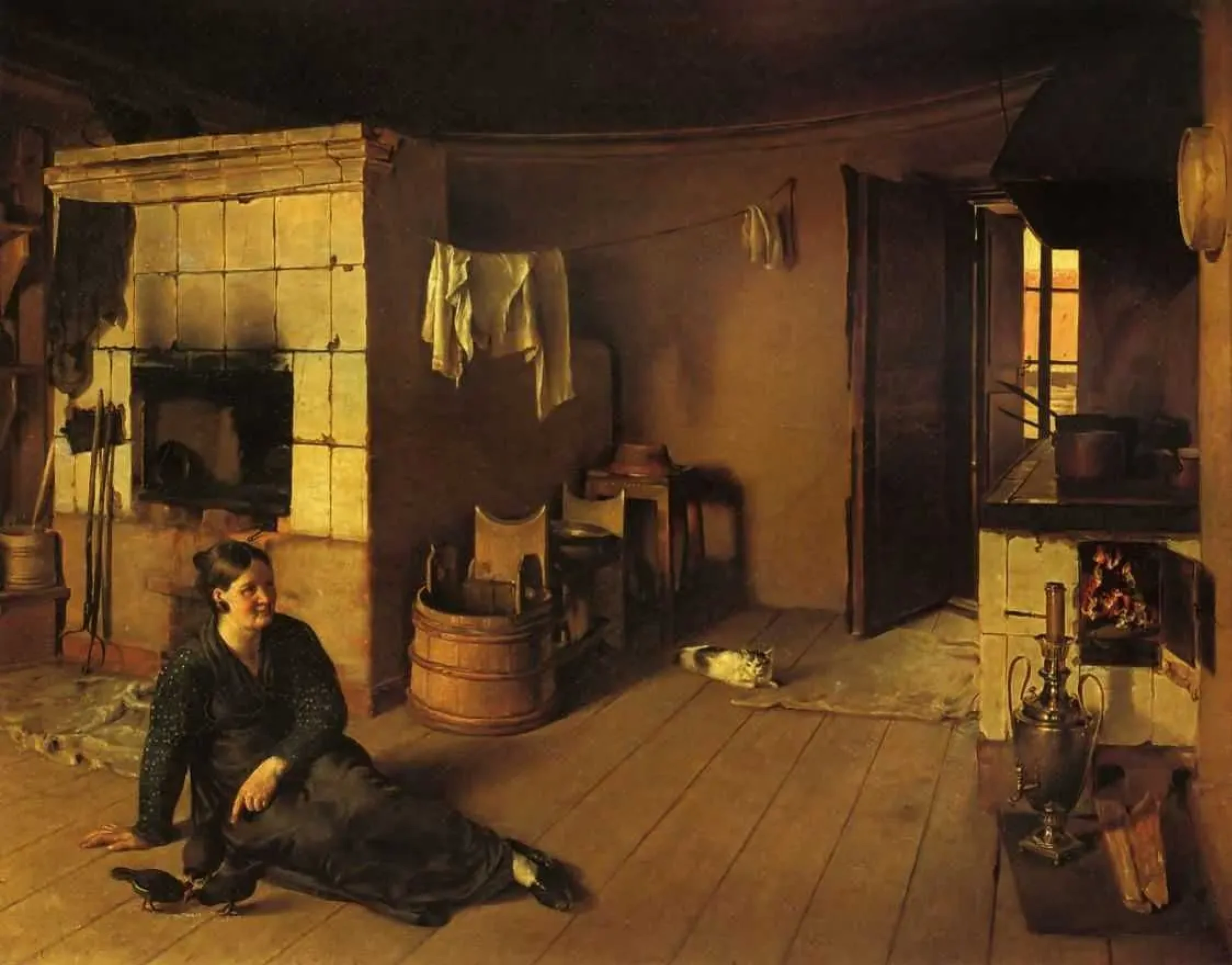

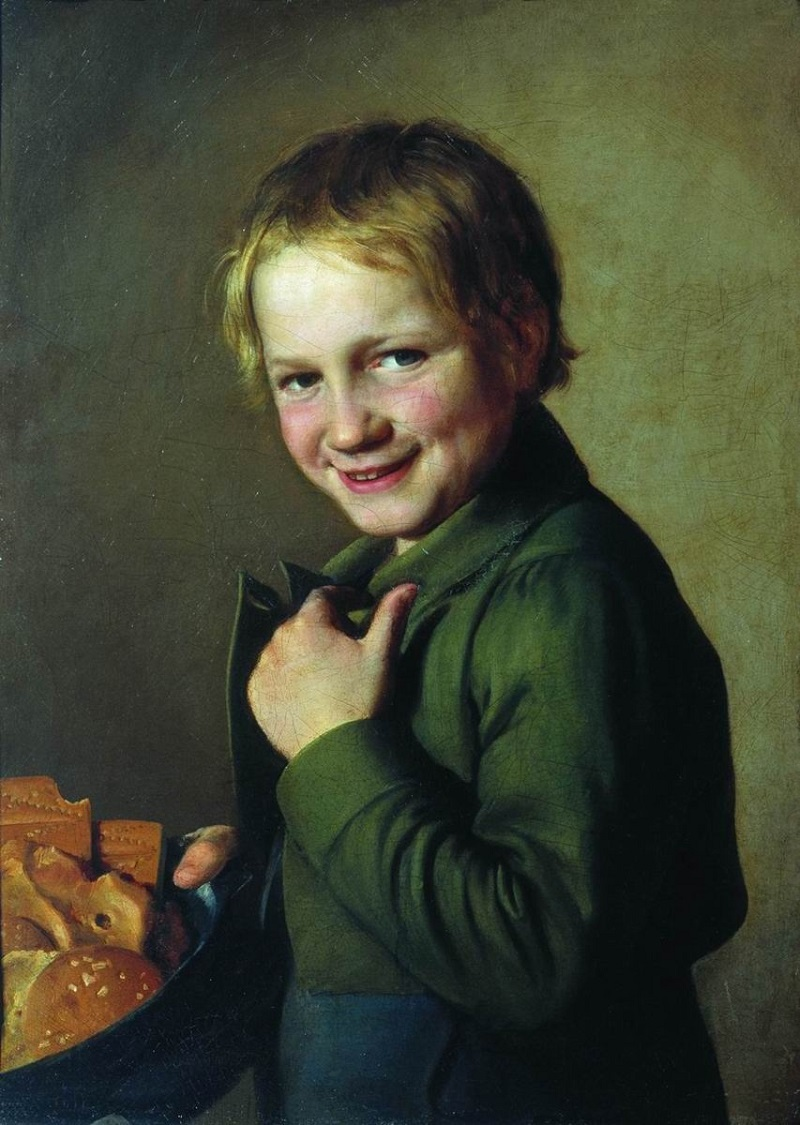
