= Nikolai Kristofari =

Nikolai Antonovich Kristofari
- Николай Антонович Кристофари
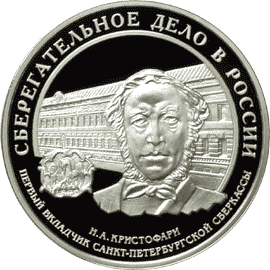
- Born: 7 October 1802; Saint Petersburg, Russian Empire
- Died: 9 March 1881 (aged 78)
- Citizenship: Russia
- Known for: His participation in the creation of banking system in Russia

Nikolai Antonovich Kristofari (Russian: Николай Антонович Кристофари) (1802 - March 9, 1881)) was a duke, honorary guardian of the Saint Petersburg Board of Trustees, assistant director of the expedition of the Saint Petersburg Loan Treasury, owner of the first passbook in the history of Russia. He held Privy Councillor rank.

== Biography ==
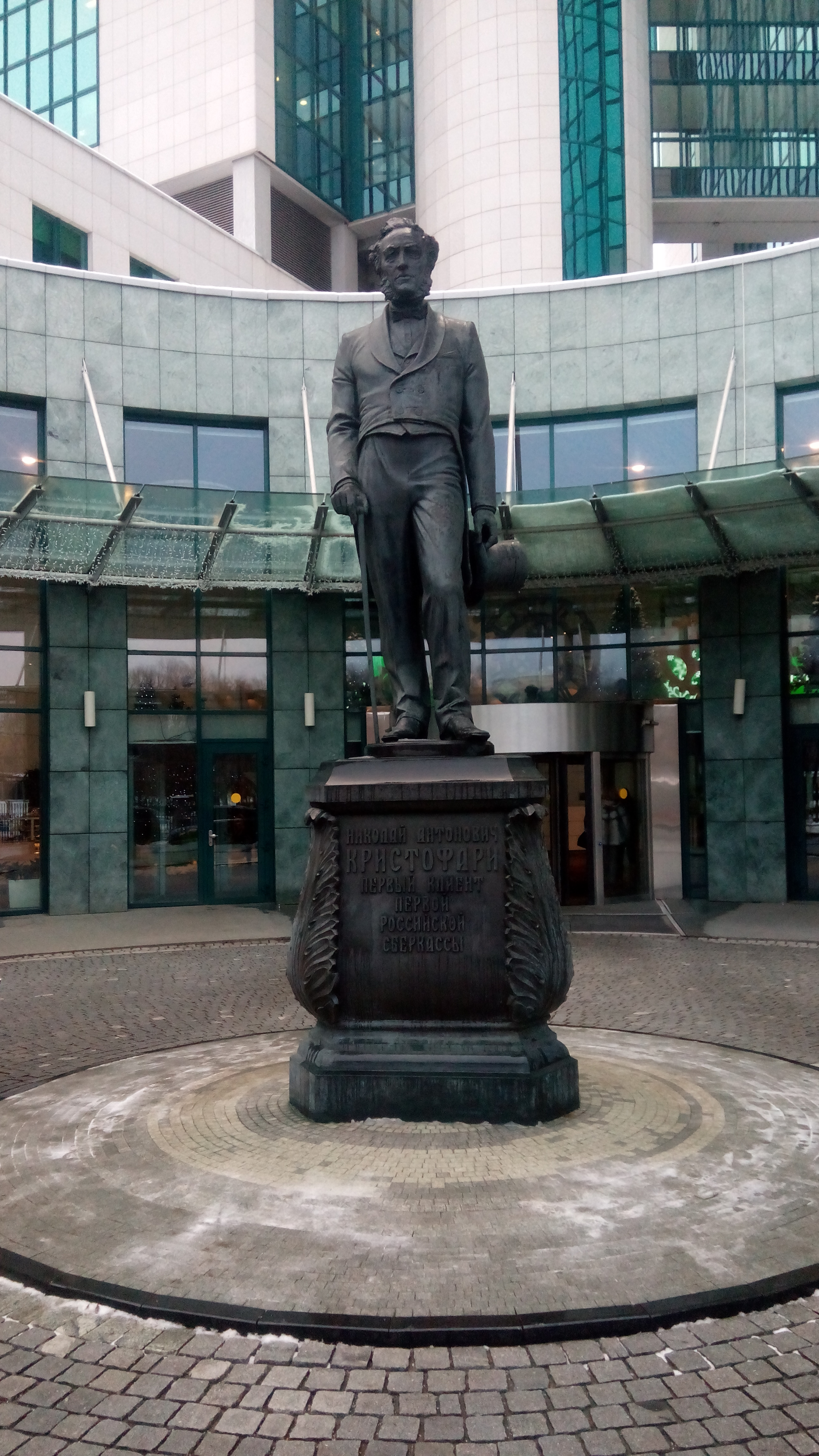
Statue of Kristofari near the headquarters of Sberbank

He was born into a family of an artist from Italian origin.

In 1820, after graduating from The Second Saint Petersburg Gymnasium, he entered the service of the Loan Treasury and in 1823 was appointed assistant director. In the 1830s, he compiled a collection of regulations relating to the loan treasury, from the time of its establishment in 1772 to 1833.

The Decree of Emperor Nicholas I of October 30 (November 11), 1841 "On the Establishment of Savings Banks" laid the foundation for the first savings banks in Russia, created at Educational Homes for Orphans and Illegitimate Children. The first government savings bank was opened on March 1 (13), 1842 in the building of the board of trustees at the safe treasury of Saint Petersburg. Savings book No. 1 was issued to Kristofari, who made a contribution in the amount of ten rubles.

In the 1850s, he was entrusted with the revision of documents and deposits of the loan treasury. Since 1855, he was in charge of the office of the board of trustees.

In 1859, he was a member of the commission to draw up a draft general charter for a loan bank and on a commission to consider proposals for financial measures to make it easier for peasants to buy land; in 1860 he was sent abroad to study the management of educational and charitable institutions.

In 1866, he was appointed an honorary guardian and received the Card Factory under his management, where he did a lot to improve the life of the workers, arranged vast buildings of cheap apartments for workers, schools for boys (in 1867), for girls (in 1868) and a maternity clinic and a shelter.

== See also ==
- Banking in Russia
- Pyotr Yefremov
