= Maria Lvova-Sinetskaya =

Russian stage actress (1795–1875)

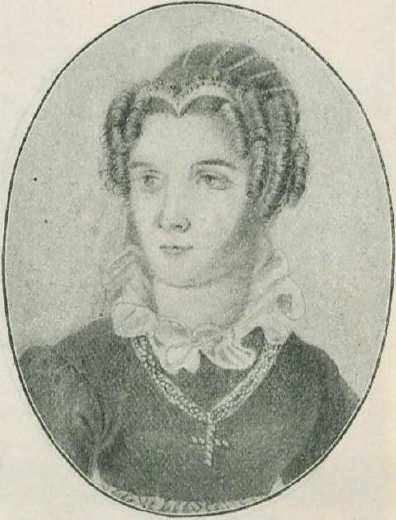
Львова-Синецкая, Мария Дмитриевна

Maria Lvova-Sinetskaya (1795 – 1875), was a Russian stage actress. She was engaged at the Imperial Theatres in Moscow 1815-1860, during which she had a successful career and referred to as the elite of her profession of her generation. She played comedy and vaudeville and progressed to tragedy during her last years.
