= Pavlovka (meteorite) =

Meteorite

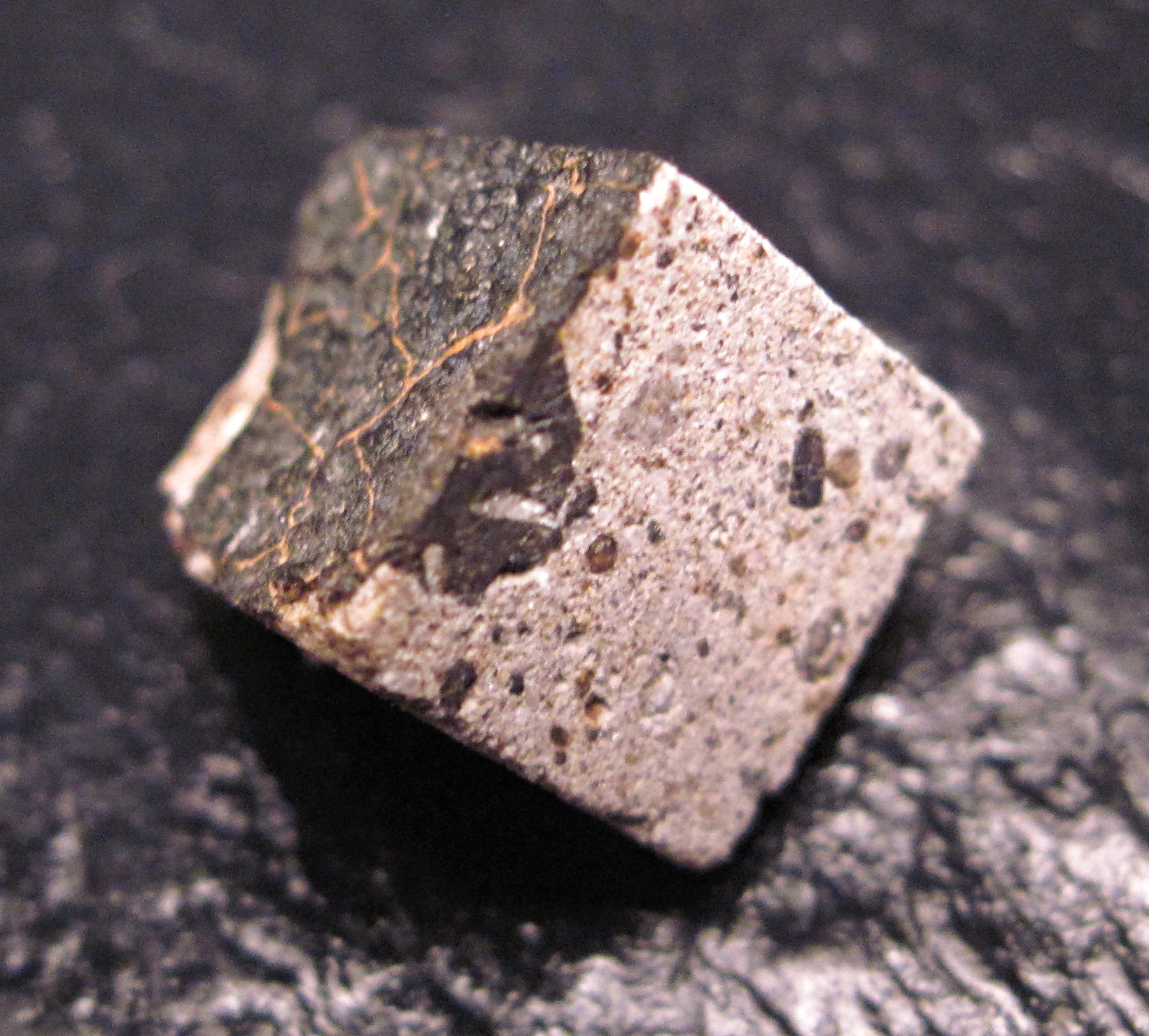
- Type: Achondrite
- Class: Asteroidal achondrite
- Group: Howardite
- Country: Russia
- Region: Saratov Oblast
- Coordinates: 52°2′N 43°0′E
- Observed fall: Yes
- Fall date: 1882-08-02
- TKW: 2 kg

Pavlovka is a howardite meteorite fallen in 1882 near a village of Pavlovka, in the western part of modern Saratov Oblast, Russia. It is currently stored in the meteorite collection of the Russian Academy of Sciences.

== See also ==
- Glossary of meteoritics
