= Nikolay Protasov =

Russian general and Ober-Procurator of the Most Holy Synod

Count Nikolay Aleksandrovich Protasov (27 December 1798 – 16 January 1855) was a Russian general and Ober-Procurator (Attorney-General) of the Most Holy Synod from 24 February 1836 to 16 January 1855.

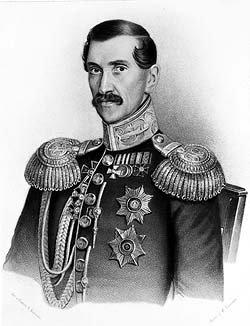
N. Protasov
