= 1837 in Russia =

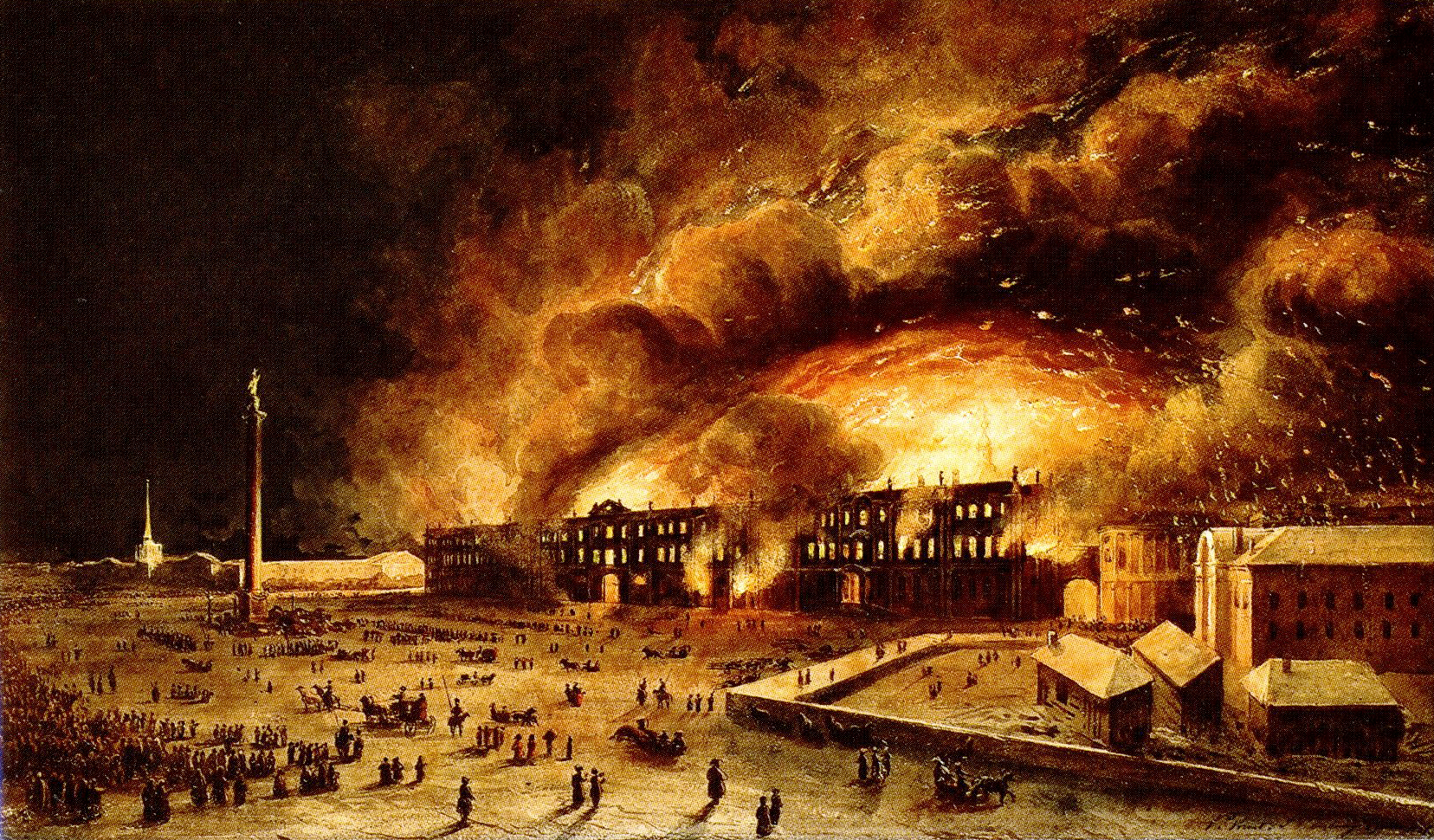
Верне. Пожар в Зимнем дворце

Events from the year 1837 in Russia

- The Winter Palace is destroyed by fire.

== Incumbents ==
- Monarch – Nicholas I

== Events ==
- Tsar Nicholas I is the first reigning Russian monarch to tour the Caucuses region since Peter I, 115 years earlier.
- Peter Chaadev publishes Apology of a Madman.
- Major reforms to the Russian imperial bureaucracy include provisions for the creation of newspapers in Russian's 42 European provinces.
- The Ministry of State Properties, which controlled government lands including farms, is created in December, 1837.
- A decree on New Year's day moved administrative control of the Russian Greek Catholic Church from Russia's interior ministry to the Holy Synod of the Russian Orthodox Church's chief procurator. This would set the stage for full union two years later
- October 30, the first train service in Russia, the Tsarskoye Selo Railway, running from St. Petersburg to Pavlovsk, opened to the public.
- Fire destroys the Winter Palace in St. Petersburg.

== Births ==
- 2 January - Mily Balakirev, Russian pianist, conductor, and composer, born in Nizhny Novgorod
- 3 March - Aleksandr Korkin, Mathematician, born Zhidovinovo,
- 19 April - Nikolai Blagoveshchensky, Writer, ethnographer and journalist, born in Moscow
- 27 May - Ivan Kramskoi, realist painter and art critic, born in Ostrogozhsk, Voronezh Governorate
- 31 May - Nikolai Uspensky, Writer, born in Stupino Tula Governorate
- 24 September - Alexander Imeretinsky, Russian general, born in Moscow
- 16 November - Franz Overbeck, Protestant Theologian, born in Saint Petersburg

== Deaths ==
- 10 February (Note: 29 January O.S.) - Alexander Pushkin, poet, dies in duel (born 1799)
