= 1793 in Russia =

== Incumbents ==
- Monarch – Catherine II

== Events ==
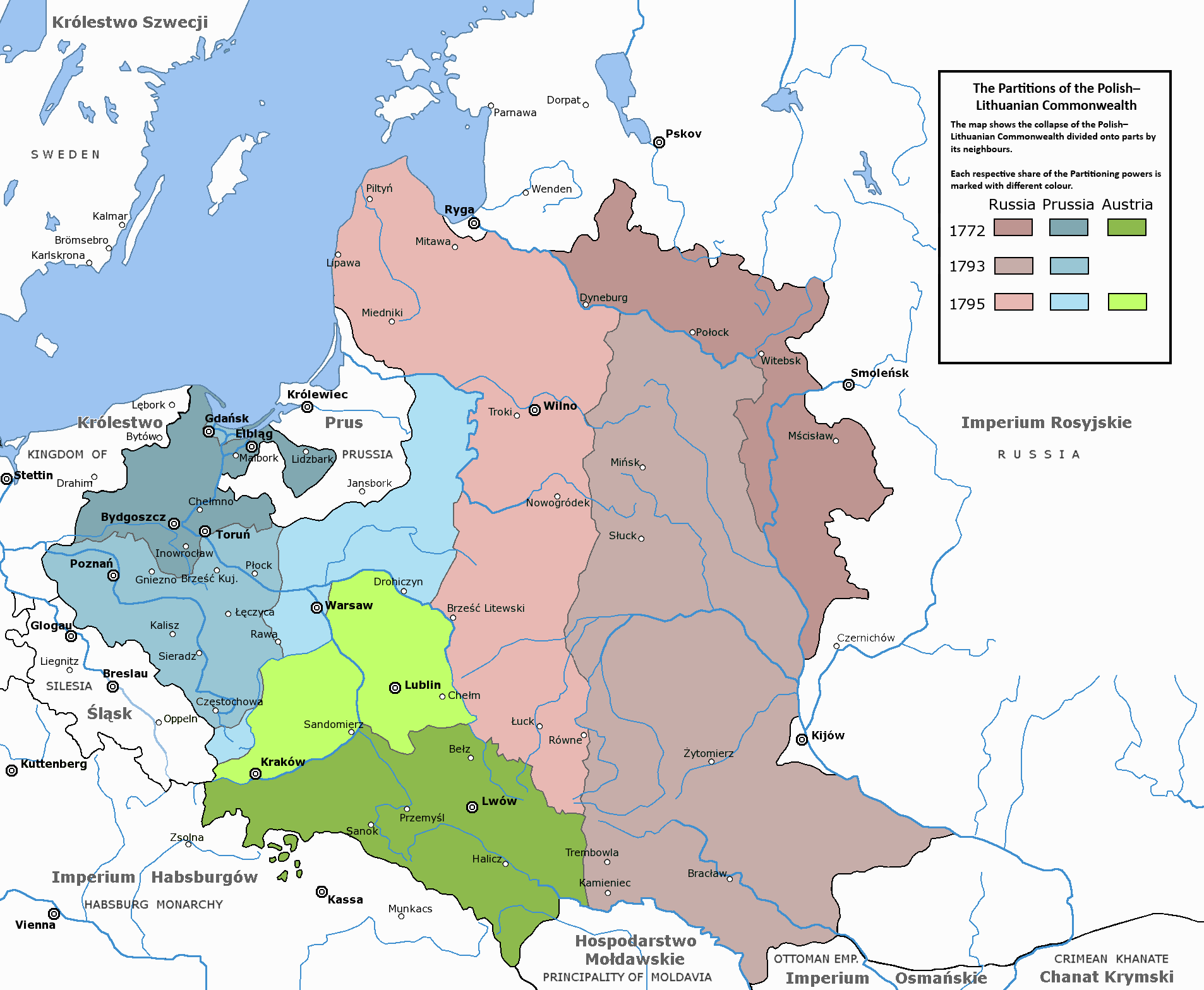
The partitions of Poland; the second partition occurred in 1793

- Minsk Governorate
- Orthodox Eparchy of Minsk and Slutsk
- Second Partition of Poland

== Births ==
- Jafargulu Bakikhanov (1793-1867) - Azerbaijani noble who became a Russian general
- Maria Danilova (1793-1810) - ballet dancer
- Apollon Galafeyev (1793-1853) - general
- Nikolay Kobozev (1793-1866) - merchant, first mayor of Berdiansk
- Karl Eduard von Napiersky (1793-1864) - Latvian historian
- Pavel Pestel (1793-1826) - revolutionary, Decembrist
- Feodor Pryanishnikov (1793-1867) - post office administrator and reformer
- Elena Yezhova (1793-1853) - opera singer and actress

== Deaths ==
- Karl Blank (1728-1793) - architect
- Mikhail Krechetnikov (1729-1793) - general
