= Elena Yezhova =

Russian opera singer

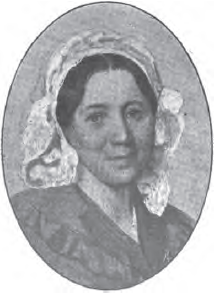
Elena Yezhova

Elena Yezhova (1793-1853) was a Russian stage actress and opera singer (mezzo soprano). She was engaged at the Bolshoi Theatre, Saint Petersburg from 1806 to 1853. She initially acted as an opera singer, but performed only as an actress from the 1820s. She belonged to the elite tier of actors at the time and she and her methods were viewed as a role model by Russian actresses in the 19th century.
