= 1875 in Russia =

- Decades: 1850s; 1860s; 1870s; 1880s; 1890s
- See also: History of Russia; Timeline of Russian history; List of years in Russia

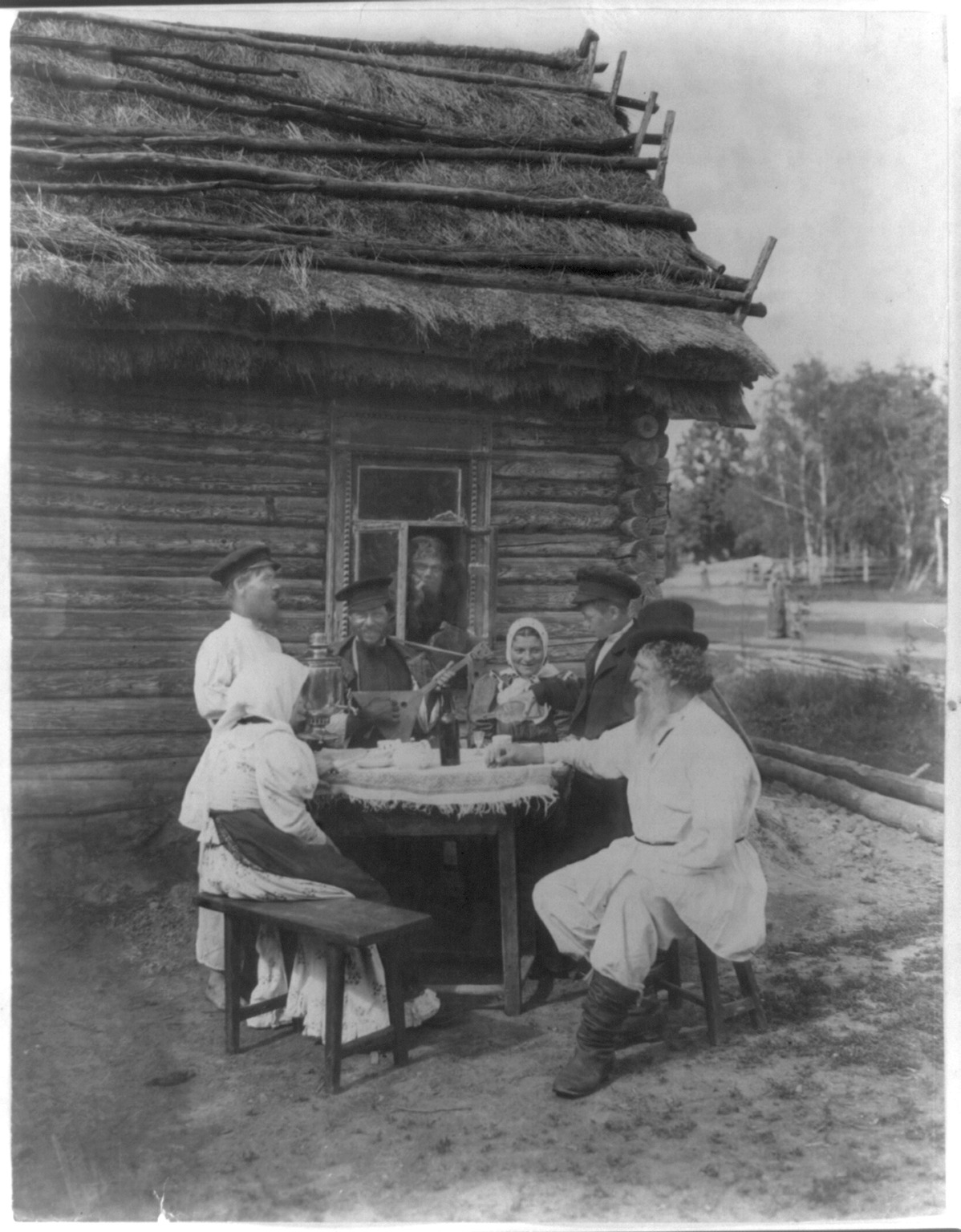
Group of Russian peasants posed at an outdoor table.

Events from the year 1875 in Russia the Eastern part of Europe

== Incumbents ==
- Monarch – Alexander II

== Events ==
- Constitution and Convention of the International Telecommunication Union
- Treaty of Saint Petersburg (1875)
- Akinchi

== Births ==
- January 11 – Reinhold Glière, composer (d. 1956)
- October 18 – Vyacheslav Troyanov, general (d. 1918)
