= Imperial Philanthropic Society =

Russian charity organization (1802–1918)

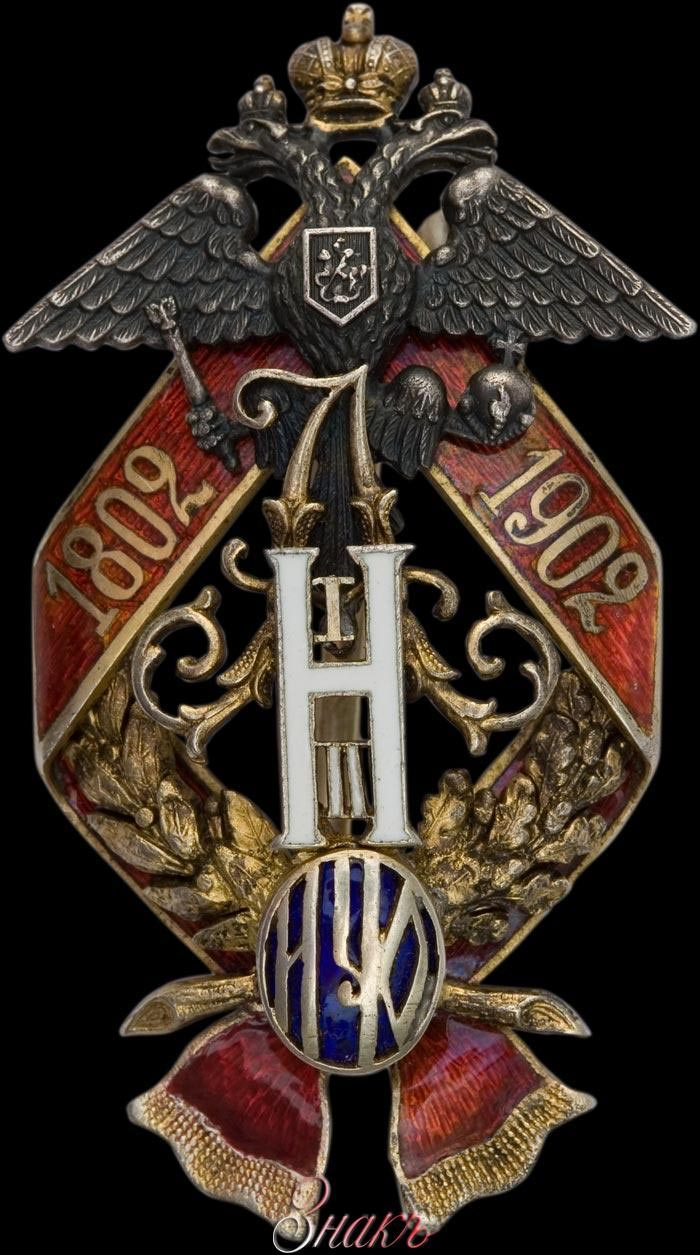
Jubilee Badge of the Imperial Philanthropic Society

The Imperial Philanthropic Society (Russian: Императорское человеколюбивое общество) was the largest charity of the Russian Empire. The Philanthropic Society was founded on 16 May 1802 by Emperor Alexander I of Russia. Its motto was Love Thy Neighbour as Thyself.
