= 1795 in Russia =

Events from the year 1795 in Russia.

== Incumbents ==
- Monarch – Catherine II

== Events ==
- Third Partition of Poland

== Establishments ==
- The Vilna Governorate, replacing the Grodno Governorate
- National Library of Russia
- New Russia (trading post)

== Births ==
- Anna Pavlovna of Russia (1795–1865) - queen of the Netherlands
- Varvara Annenkova (1795–1866) - poet
- Prince Okropir of Georgia (1795–1857) - Georgian prince
- Mikhail Khomutov (1795–1864) - general
- Maria Lvova-Sinetskaya (1795–1875) - actress
- Hillel Paritcher (1795–1864) - Chabad rabbi

== Deaths ==
- Aleksey Antropov (1716–1795) - painter
- Ivan Betskoy (1704–1795) - education reformer
- Gerasim Izmailov (circa 1745 - 1795 or after) - navigator
- Grand Duchess Olga Pavlovna of Russia - daughter of Paul I of Russia
- Mark Poltoratsky (1729–1795) - singer, founder of Poltoratsky family
- Grigory Shelikhov (1747–1795) - merchant who founded first permanent Russian settlement in North America
