= 1797 in Russia =

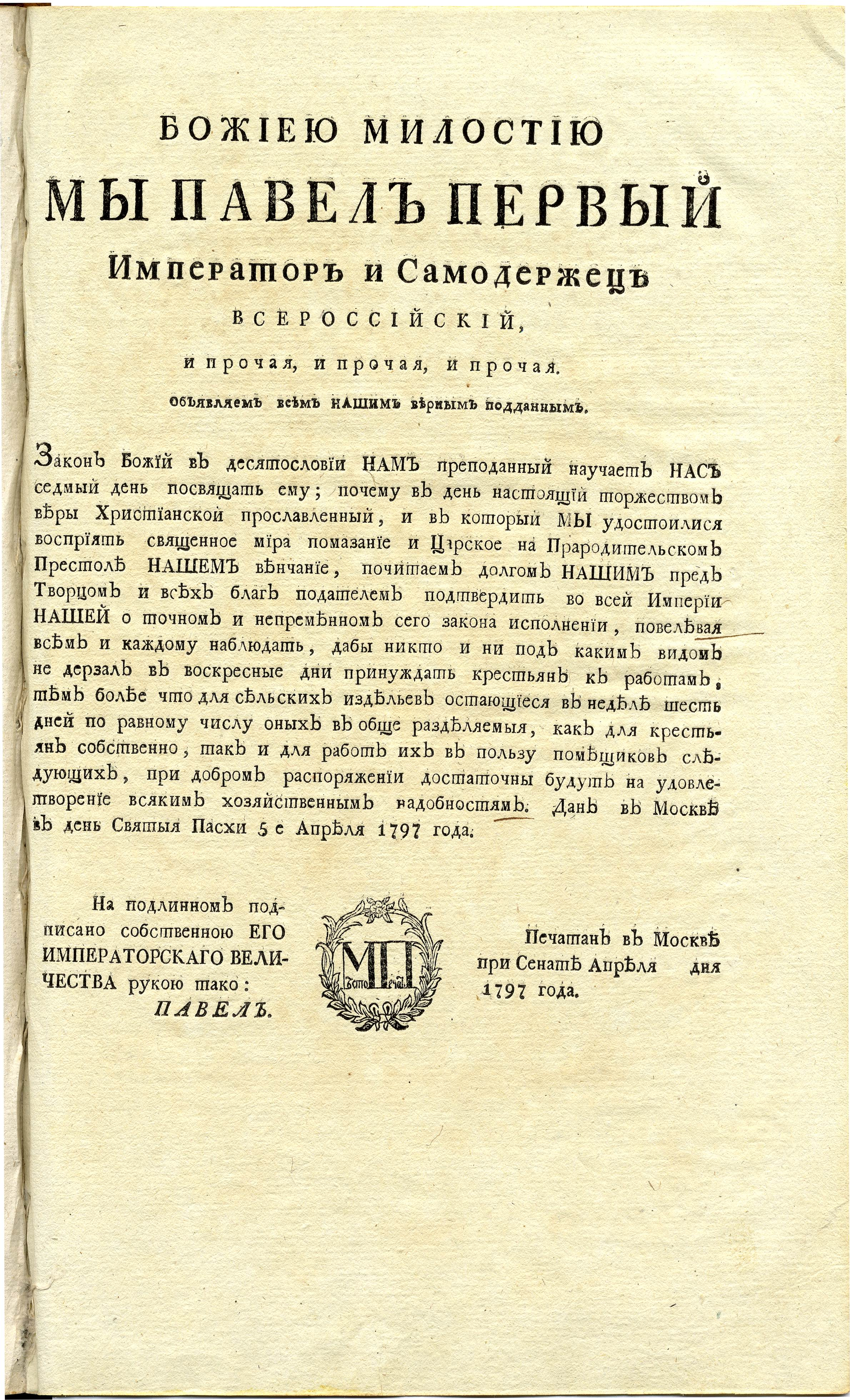
The manifesto of three-day corvee.

Events from the year 1797 in Russia

== Incumbents ==
- Monarch – Paul I

== Events ==
- Third Partition of Poland
- Pauline Laws - house laws of the House of Romanov established
- April 5 – Manifesto of three-day corvee
- Office of the Institutions of Empress Maria
- Herzen University founded
- Saint Petersburg Theological Academy founded

== Births ==
- Alexander Bestuzhev, Decembrist, writer (d. 1837)
- Dimitri Ivanovich Dolgorukov, diplomat and travelling companion of Washington Irving (d. 1867)
- Yelizaveta Golitsyna, noblewoman, Roman Catholic nun (d. 1844)
- Innocent of Alaska, Russian Orthodox missionary priest, Orthodox bishop and archbishop in the Americas, and Metropolitan of Moscow and all Russia. (d. 1879)
- Alexander Kazarsky, naval officer, war hero (d. 1833)
- Nikolay Dmitrievich Mylnikov, portrait painter (d. 1842)
- Arsena Odzelashvili, Georgian outlaw, (d. 1842)
- Friedrich Benjamin von Lütke, Russian navigator, geographer, and Arctic explorer. (d. 1882)

== Deaths ==
- Ivan Chernyshyov, diplomat and admiralty official (b. 1726)
- Ekaterina Kniazhnina, poet (b. 1746)
- Pyotr Melissino, General of the Artillery (b. 1726)
- Vasily Pashkevich, composer, singer, violinist, teacher (b. circa 1742)
- Alexei Senyavin, admiral (b. 1716)
- Ivan Shuvalov, first Russian Minister of Education (b. 1727)
