= Poltoratsky =

Poltoratsky, feminine: Poltoratskaya is a Russian surname of the noble Poltoratsky family

- Agafokleya Poltoratskaya
- Konstantin Poltoratsky
- Mark Poltoratsky
- Roman Poltoratsky
- Serge Poltoratzky
- Sergey Poltoratsky
