= Poltoratsky family =

Poltoratsky family Полторацкие
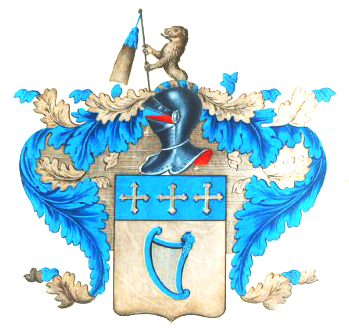
- Country: Russian Empire
- Founder: Mark Poltoratsky
- Estates: Utkina Dacha, Avchurino, Gruziny, Krasnoye, Kosaya Gora, Istye

The Poltoratsky family was a Russian noble family, descended from the Cossack Mark Fedorovich Poltoratsky (1729–1795), who during the reign of Catherine the Great, was in charge of the Court Singing Chapel. The Poltoratsky coat of arms shows a harp as a sign of this.

== History ==
"The family that recently emerged from the merchants, in which all the brothers and sisters were distinguished by a sharp tone and an extraordinary enterprise in all kinds of labor", the contemporary of the Poltoratsky family characterized them in the 1820s.

Poltoratsky owned famous estates Gruziny in Tver Governorate and Avchurino in Kaluga Governorate. Outside these provinces, they were also included in the genealogical books of the provinces of Kursk, Penza, St. Petersburg and Tambov.

== Significant members ==
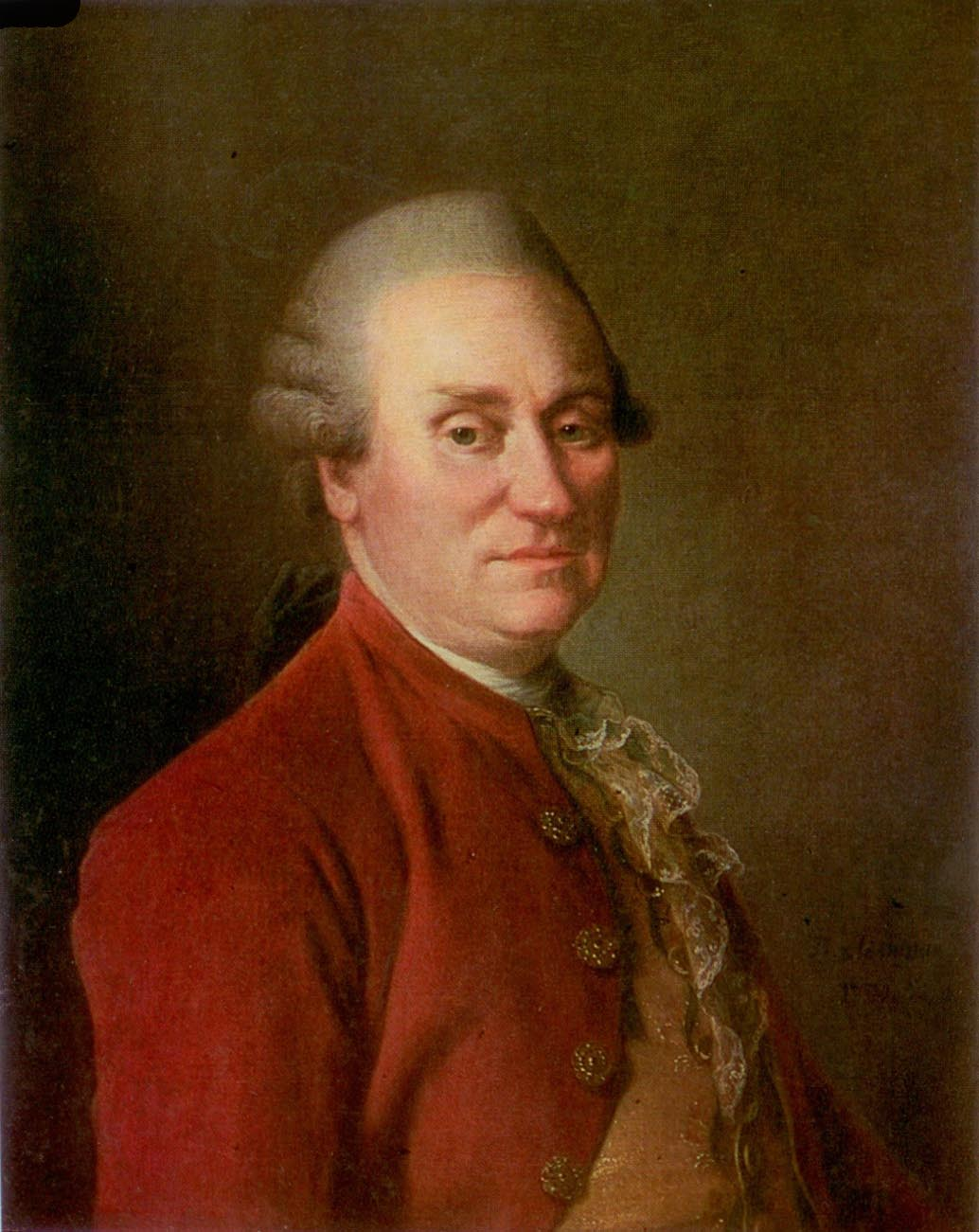
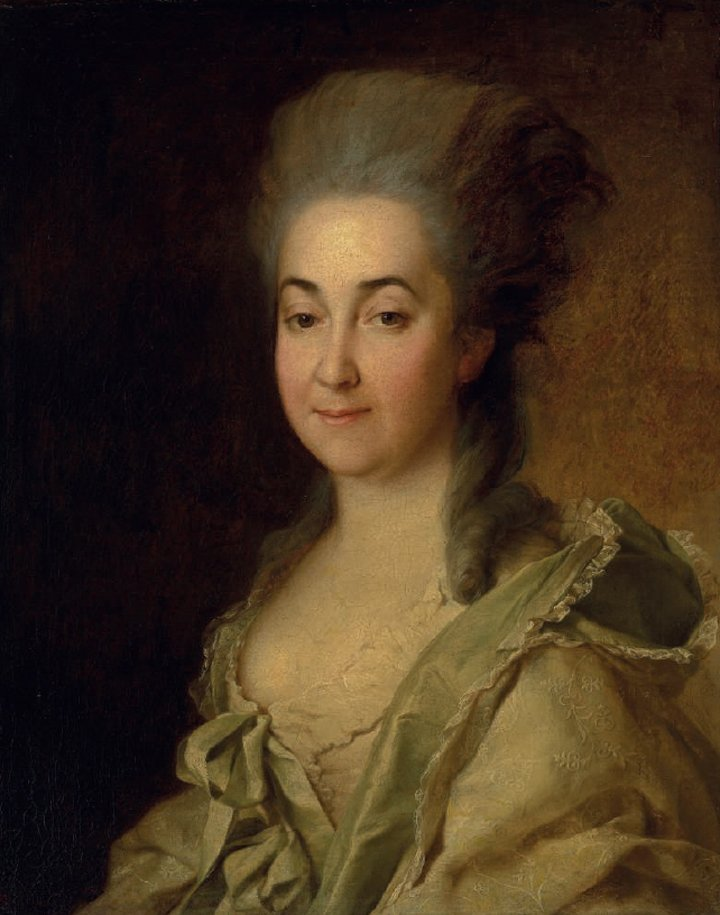
Couple of the founders of the family in the portraits of Dmitry Levitzky
- Fedor Filippovich Poltoratsky was a cathedral archpriest in Sosnitsa (the land of the Chernigov Regiment).
  - Mark Fedorovich (1729 – 1795) was a singer (baritone), granted in 1763 to the nobility.
    ∞ Agafokleya Shishkova (1737 – 1822) was a woman with an entrepreneurial spirit who kept the whole Tver Governorate at the mercy of, making for her husband a considerable fortune of 4000 souls.
    - Alexey Markovich (1759 – 1843) was a Tver provincial leader of the nobility; in 1823 he married Varvara Dmitrievna Kiseleva (1797 – 1859), the sister of Count Pavel Kiselyov.
      - Vladimir Alekseevich (1828 – 1889) was a major general, a participant in the Caucasian War, Turkestan Campaign and the Russo-Turkish War of 1877–78.
      - Peter Alekseevich (1844 – 1909) was an Active Privy Councillor.
    - Dmitry Markovich (1761 – 1818) was a famous horse breeder, owner of the Avchurino estate.
      - Sergey Dmitrievich (1803 – 1884) was a bibliophile and bibliographer.
      - Vera was the wife of Alexander Vonlyarsky, the owner of Ray estate.
    - Fyodor Markovich (1764 – 1858) was the owner of furniture, paper and cloth factories, sugar and distilleries in the settlement Chernyanka of the Kursk Province. From 1788, he was married to Varvara Afanasyevna Bryanchaninovova, and the second from 1801 to Elizabeth Frantsevna Benyoni, a Frenchwoman.
      - Elizabeth (1789 – 1828) was married to Ivan Yakovlevich Bukharin (1772 – 1858), their daughter Vera Ivanovna (1813 – 1902) was the wife of General Nicholas Annenkov.
      - Alexander (1794 – 18..)
      - Alexey (1810 – 1870)
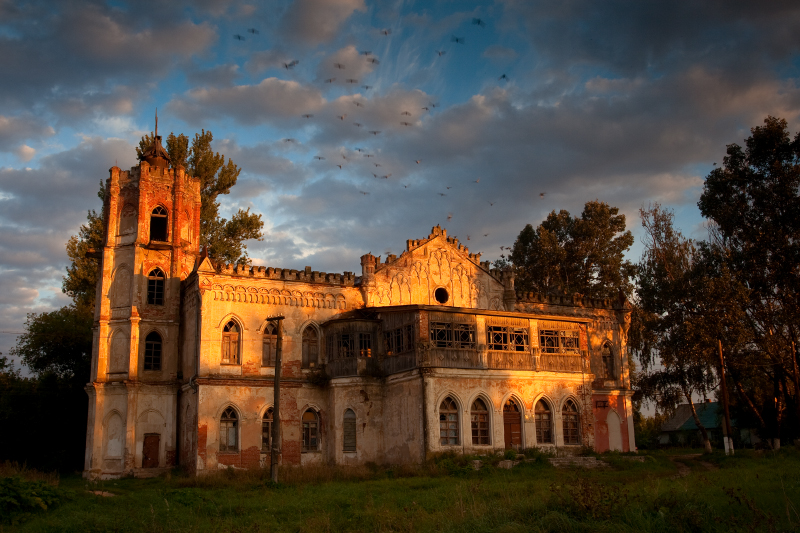
        Manor of Poltoratsky in the village of Avchurino
    - Alexander Markovich (1766 – 1839) was the manager of the Saint Petersburg Mint.
      - Alexander (1792 – 1855) was a Tambov district leader of the nobility.
        ∞ Ekaterina Pavlovna was the daughter of Pavel Bakunin.
        - Paul was a major general.
      - Mikhail (1801 – 1836) was a friend of Alexander Pushkin.
    - Pavel Markovich (1768 – 1827)
      - Alexander Pavlovich (1796 – 1863) participated in the War of 1812 and foreign campaigns. In 1819 he was the captain of the Life Guards Izmailovo Regiment. A member of the Union of Salvation and the Union of Welfare, his membership in them is ignored. Since 1828, retired, subsequently an Active State Councillor.
        - Andrey Aleksandrovich
          - Victor Andreevich (? – 1911)
            - Tatyana Viktorovna
              - Victor Alexandrovich (1949 – 1985) was a Soviet composer, pianist.
      - Alexey (1802 – 1863) was an Active State Councillor.
      - Anna was the wife of Ivan Rally.
    - Elizaveta Markovna (1768 – 1838) was the heir to the Okkervil manor.
      ∞ Alexey Olenin
      - Anna Olenina
    - Peter Markovich (1775 – after 1851)
      - Anna Kern (1800 – 1879) was known for her role in the life of Alexander Pushkin.
      - Elizabeth (also a friend of Pushkin)
      - Alexander
        - Vladimir Alexandrovich (1830 – 1886) was a Russian general, cartographer, Semipalatinsk governor, participant of the so-called Turkestan Campaigns.
    - Agafokleya Markovna (1776 – 1840) was the wife of Major General Alexander Sukharev, the heir to the manor house Kosaya Gora.
    - Varvara Markovna (1778 – 18..) was the wife of Dmitry Borisovich Mertvago.
    - Konstantin Markovich (1782 – 1858) was lieutenant general, participant in Napoleonic Wars, Yaroslavl governor.
    - Yegor Markovich

== Information in the General Armorial of the Noble Families ==
Volume and sheet of the General Armorial: II, 142.
Parts of the genealogy book: II, III.
The coat of arms of Poltoratsky in the General Armorial of the noble families of the Russian Empire:
"The shield is divided horizontally into two parts, of which three silver crosses of the trifoliate figure are depicted in the upper blue field. In the lower part in the silver field there is a harp with stretched blue strings.

The shield is crowned with an ordinary noble helmet, decorated with a noble torse, on the surface of which a silver lion extending to half is visible, holding a bunchuk with a blue rim and a black shaft in its front paws. The mantling on the shield is blue, enclosed with silver. The coat of arms was included in Part 2 of the General Armorial of the Noble Clans of the All-Russian Empire, p. 142".
