= Konstantin Poltoratsky =

Konstantin Markovich Poltoratsky
- Константин Маркович Полторацкий
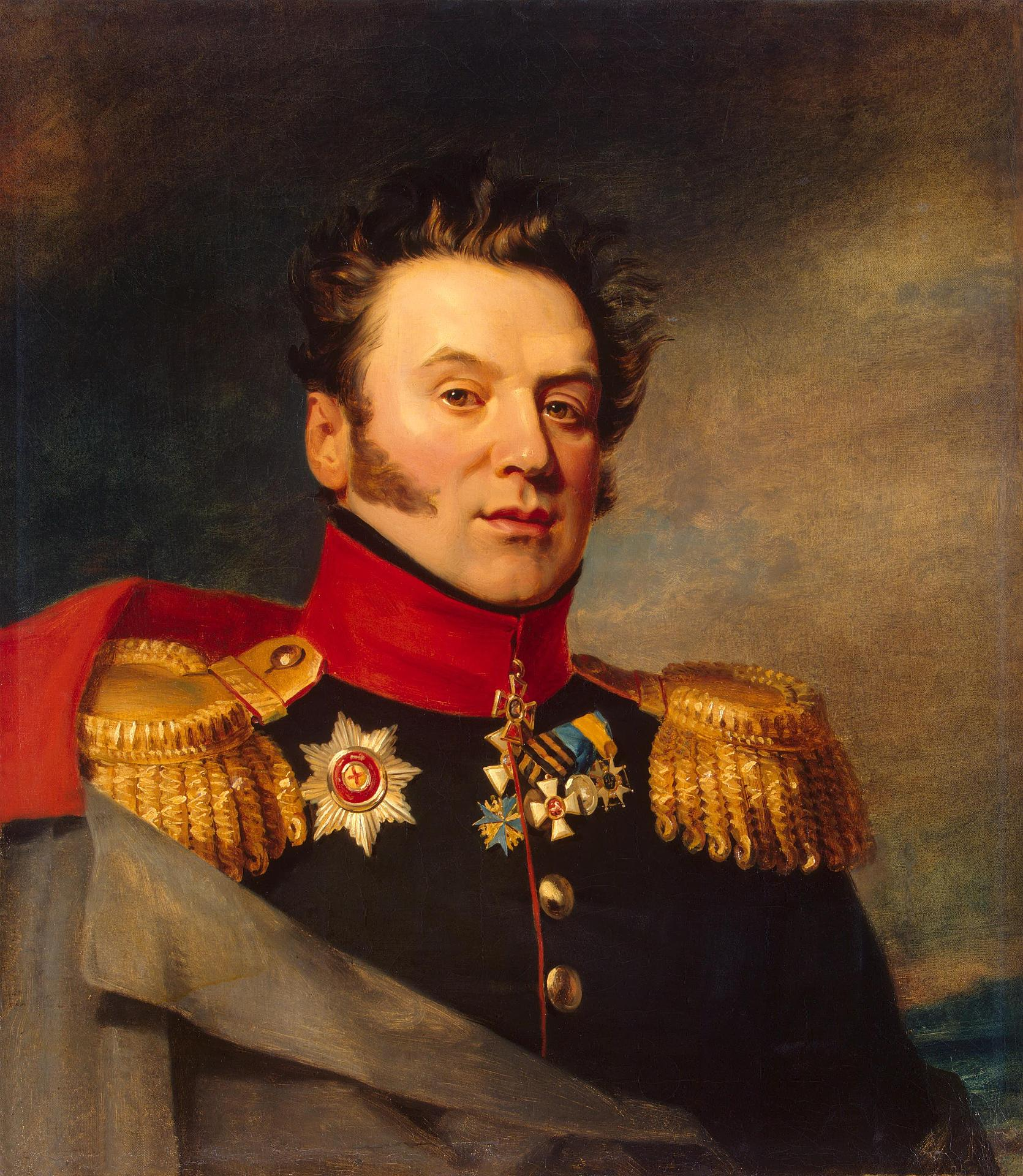
- Portrait by George Dawe

Yaroslavl Governor
- In office January 29, 1830 – July 17, 1842
- Preceded by: Michael Bravin
- Succeeded by: Irakly Baratynsky

Personal details
- Born: June 1, 1782 Chernigov Governorate, Russian Empire
- Died: March 27, 1858 (aged 75) Saint Petersburg, Russian Empire
- Resting place: Coastal Monastery of Saint Sergius
- Relations: Poltoratsky family
- Awards: Order of the White Eagle; Order of the Red Eagle; Order of the Sword; Order of Saint Vladimir; Order of Saint George; Order of Saint Anna; Pour le Mérite

Military service
- Allegiance: Russian Empire
- Branch/service: Infantry
- Years of service: 1798 – 1830, 1834 – 1842
- Rank: Lieutenant general
- Battles/wars: Napoleonic Wars

Konstantin Markovich Poltoratsky (Russian: Константи́н Ма́ркович Полтора́цкий; May 30, 1782 – March 15, 1858) was a Yaroslavl Military and Civil Governor (1830–1842), lieutenant general of the Imperial Russian Army, a participant of five wars, including the French invasion of Russia.

== Biography ==
Konstantin Markovich Poltoratsky was born on May 21, 1782 (according to other sources, on May 2 or 30). Father – Mark Fedorovich Poltoratsky, head of the Court Chapel. Mother – Agafokleya Aleksandrovna Shishkova, in marriage Poltoratskaya, the famous "Poltorachikha". Konstantin Markovich had many sisters and brothers, the daughter of one of them was Anna Kern.

At the age of 2 years, Constantine was enrolled in the Semyonovsky Life Guards Regiment with the rank of Fourier. At the age of 15 he was promoted to ensign of his regiment. In 1802, serving as a regimental adjutant, he was implicated in the story of Lieutenant Alexei Shubin, who fabricated a conspiracy against the emperor that he had allegedly revealed in order to curry favor. Poltoratsky, believing Shubin (who shot himself in the Summer Garden), went to the palace at night and raised Alexander I.

He took part in the War of the Third Coalition and in the War of the Fourth Coalition. He proved himself in the Battle of Austerlitz (he was awarded the Order of Saint Anna, 4th class and promoted to stabs-kapitan) and in 1807 in the Battle of Heilsberg and Battle of Friedland, for which he was awarded the Order of Saint Vladimir, 4th class and promoted to captain. On May 20, 1808, he was promoted to colonel.

In the Russo-Turkish War of 1806–1812, he took part in the Danube army, where he was seconded in 1810. He proved himself in Battle of Batin, during the siege and capture of Silistria. On May 15, 1811, he was appointed chief of the Nishloth Infantry Regiment. For the assault of Lovcha in 1811, he was awarded the Golden Sword "For Bravery". For the liberation of the village of Gromadi – Order of Saint Vladimir, 3rd class. From January 10, 1812, he was chief of the Tiflis Infantry Regiment, in February he was appointed commander, and from March 12, 1812, he was appointed Chief of the Nasheburg Infantry Regiment, which was part of the 1st Brigade of the 9th Infantry Division of the Corps of Eugene Markov of the 3rd Reserve Observational Army. As part of his regiment participated in the French invasion of Russia. For the Battle of Kobrin and Battle of Gorodechno he was awarded the Order of Saint George, 4th class (November 22, 1812). For his distinction in the battle near Konigsvart on September 15, 1813, he was promoted to major general and was appointed brigade commander from the Apsheron and Nasheburg regiments. In 1813, he fought at the siege of the fortress of Thorn, in the Battle of Leipzig, for which he received the Order of Saint Anna, 1st class.

In 1814, he participated in the battles of Brienne, La Rothière, and Champaubert, where he was wounded and taken prisoner by the French together with his corps commander General Zakhar Olsufiev. From captivity released after the capture of Paris. Returned to his brigade. July 29, 1817, he was appointed commander of the 3rd Brigade of the 23rd Infantry division. He continued his service in France as part of the corps of Mikhail Vorontsov until 1818. After returning to Russia, he was appointed commander of the 2nd brigade of the 9th Infantry Division. The officers and soldiers of the Nasheburgsky regiment, according to the memoirs of a contemporary, wept at parting with Poltoratsky, he deserved so much love and disposition of his subordinates. March 13, 1822, he was appointed to "patronize the army". On January 28, 1830, he was renamed as Privy Councillor and appointed as Yaroslavl Civil Governor. On February 18, 1835, he received the rank of lieutenant general and was renamed as the Yaroslavl Military Governor with civilian control. Made a lot of useful for the development of education and charity in the Yaroslavl Province. In 1842 he retired for health reasons. In last years he lived in Saint Petersburg, where he died on March 15, 1858, and was buried in the Coastal Monastery of Saint Sergius.

== Family ==
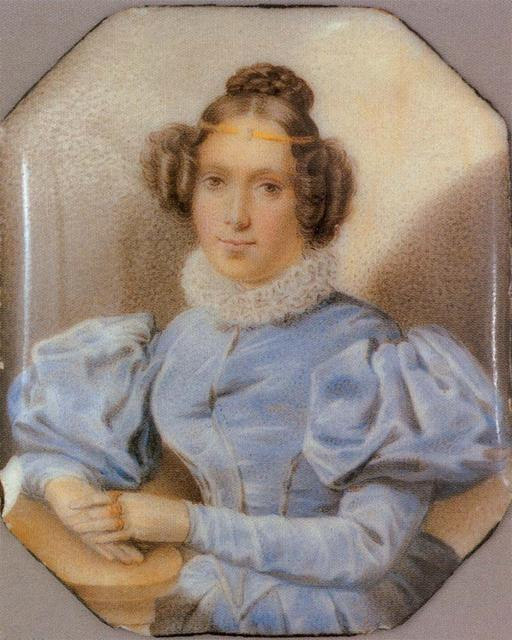
Sofya Borisovna Golitsyna

- Wife – on August 18, 1818, in Pavlovsk, married Princess Sofya Borisovna Golitsyna (April 15, 1795 – November 19, 1871), daughter of Lieutenant-General Prince Boris Golitsyn; the maid of honor of the highest court and the cavalier lady of the Order of Saint Catherine of the Lesser Cross; for which he received a dowry of more than 1,000 souls of serfs in Kozelsky and Novotorzhsky counties. She was raised by a Frenchwoman from the retinue of the Duchess of Polignac. According to contemporaries, Madame Poltoratskaya was "definitely not beautiful, but pretty, she spoke well and courteously, which was already a charm". In her Yaroslavl parlor, Marquis de Custine, by his own admission, felt like "in London or rather in Petersburg". Widowed, she lived in the capital in the house of her sister, the famous philanthropist Tatiana Potemkina on Millionnaya Street, 22, where she died suddenly from cardiac arrest. Buried next to her husband in the Sergius Monastery. As noted by relative:

In general, few people regretted the death of Mrs. Poltoratskaya because of her despotic character, which completely obscured her good qualities in her. In general, selfishness, vanity, despotism and the habit of not seeing anyone but herself around her were her distinguishing qualities.

- Son – Boris Konstantinovich (January 9, 1820 – February 10, 1850), the captain of the Life Guards Regiment of His Majesty, died unmarried.

== Sources ==
- Dictionary of Russian generals, participants in hostilities against the army of Napoleon Bonaparte in 1812 – 1815
- Konstantin Markovich Poltoratsky (Russian Biographical Dictionary)
