= Tyurin =

Tyurin (Russian: Тюрин) is a Russian masculine surname, its feminine counterpart is Tyurina. It may refer to

- Anatoly Tyurin (born 1968), Russian canoer
- Denis Tyurin (born 1980), Russian ice hockey player
- Galina Tyurina (1938–1970), Soviet mathematician
- Lyubov Tyurina (1943–2015), Russian volleyball player
- Mikhail Tyurin (born 1960), Russian cosmonaut
- Oleg Tyurin (1937–2010), Russian rower
- Platon Tyurin (1816–1882), Russian painter
- Vadim Tyurin (born 1971), Russian football player
- Yelena Tyurina (born 1971), Russian volleyball player
- Yevgraph Tyurin (c.1793–1875), Russian architect and art collector
