= Alexey Buturlin =

Alexey Petrovich Buturlin
- Алексей Петрович Бутурлин
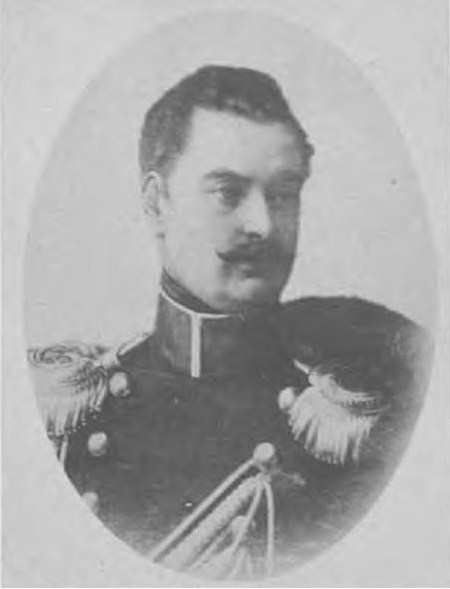
- Photo of the 1850s

Senator of the Russian Empire
- In office 1861–1863

Yaroslavl Governor
- In office June 1, 1846 – January 1, 1861
- Preceded by: Irakly Baratynsky
- Succeeded by: Alexey Obolensky

Personal details
- Born: January 13, 1802
- Died: January 26, 1863 (aged 61)
- Relations: Buturlins
- Parents: Peter Buturlin (father); Maria Shakhovskaya (mother)
- Known for: Orthodoxy (religion)
- Awards: Order of Saint George; Order of Saint Vladimir; Order of Saint Anna; Order of Saint Stanislaus; Virtuti Militari; Order of the Red Eagle

Military service
- Allegiance: Russian Empire
- Branch/service: Army
- Years of service: 1819–1863
- Rank: Lieutenant General
- Battles/wars: Suppression of the Polish Uprising (1830); Storming of Warsaw (1831)

Alexey Petrovich Buturlin (January 13, 1802 – January 26, 1863) was a Russian lieutenant general, Governor of Yaroslavl, senator; brother of Dmitry and Mikhail Buturlin. The owner of the large family estate Marinka.

== Biography ==
The son of a retired captain of the Izmailovsky Life Guards Regiment Pyotr Buturlin (1763–1828) and Maria Shakhovskaya (d. April 22, 1803).

Received a good education at home. Having started his service in 1819 as a cadet in the Life Guards Jaeger Regiment, he soon, of his own free will, was transferred to the Chevalier Guard Regiment and in 1822, he was promoted to cornet.

In 1829, with the rank of His Majesty's aide–de–camp, after the conclusion of peace with Turkey, Buturlin was sent to the active army to be handed over from the Sovereign Field Marshal's baton to the Commander–in–Chief Count Diebitsch. Since 1830, he was under the Grand Duke Konstantin Pavlovich in Poland, where the next year he took part in the suppression of the uprising and, for the storming of Warsaw, was awarded the Order of Saint Vladimir, 4th Degree.

In 1839, Colonel Buturlin was entrusted with overseeing the recruitment process in the Yekaterinoslav Governorate, which was carried out according to the new, first introduced in Russia, lottery system. In 1841, he was entrusted with the destruction of the riots that arose between the peasants of the Livonian Governorate.

On January 12, 1846 he was awarded the Order of Saint George, 4th Degree (No. 7391). On July 1, 1846, Buturlin was promoted to major general, enrolled in the retinue of His Majesty, and was appointed military and civilian Governor of Yaroslavl. He remained in this position for 15 years. On August 26, 1856, Buturlin was promoted to lieutenant general, and in 1861, he was appointed a senator and assigned to the 1st Department of the 5th Department of the Governing Senate, where he remained until his death "from softening of the brain" on January 26, 1863. He was buried in Saint Petersburg, in the Feodorovskaya Church of the Alexander Nevsky Lavra.

== Awards ==
- Order of Saint Anna, 3rd Class (January 16, 1826)
- Order of Saint Vladimir, 4th Class With a Bow (June 25, 1831)
- Badge of Distinction for Military Merit, 4th Class (1831)
- Order of Saint Anna, 2nd Class (September 1, 1839)
- Insignia of Blameless Service for 20 Years (1845)
- Order of Saint George, 4th Class for 25 Years of Immaculate Service in the Officer Ranks (January 12, 1846)
- Order of Saint Vladimir, 3rd Class (1848)
- Order of Saint Stanislaus, 1st Class (April 22, 1850)
- Order of Saint Anna, 1st Class (1854)
- Insignia of Immaculate Service for 30 Years (1855)
- Order of Saint Vladimir, 2nd Class With Swords (1858)
- Order of the Red Eagle, 2nd Class With a Star (1851, Kingdom of Prussia)

== Family ==
From 1835, he was married to the maid of honor Olga Sukhtelen (December 13, 1816 – April 12, 1891), daughter of General Pavel Sukhtelen (1788–1833) and Countess Varvara Zubova (1799–1880), who abandoned her husband and daughter, and "had other children from other men". About their marriage, Alexander Bulgakov wrote to his daughter:

Pretty Sukhtelen, in whom the rich Maltsov is in love, whom she, in turn, does not want, marries Buturlin. When she came to ask the Empress for permission to marry, the Empress told her: And finally, this poor Maltsov has achieved his happiness. Sukhtelen, amazed, replied: I am asking your permission to marry Buturlin. – In my opinion, he is not the kind of husband that this interesting person should follow.

They had two daughters in marriage:

- Alexandra Alekseevna (1836–1907), married to Vasily Popov (1835–1866);
- Maria Alekseevna (1849–?), married to Naydenov.
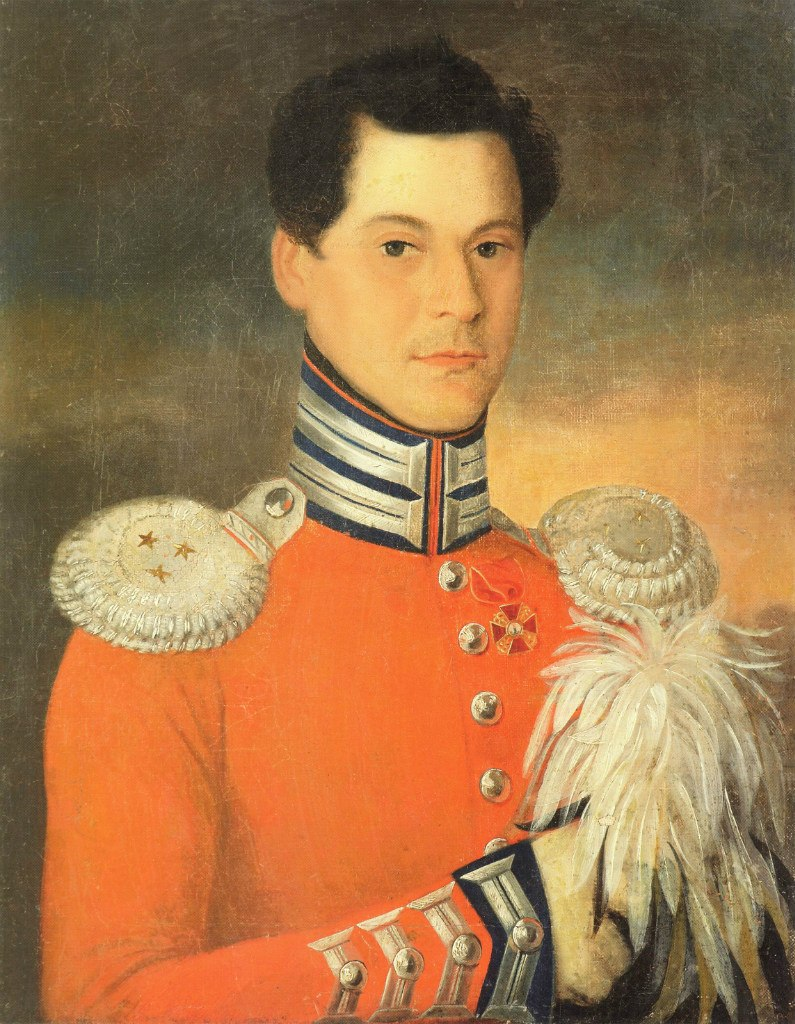
Buturlin in the uniform of a lieutenant of the Life Guards Cavalry Regiment. Portrait by Platon Aliptov, 1829

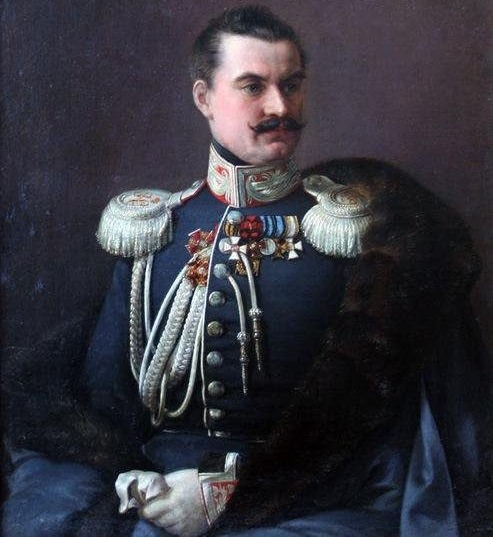
Portrait by Platon Tyurin, 1846

== Sources ==
- Buturlin, Alexey Petrovich // Russian Biographical Dictionary: in 25 Volumes – Saint Petersburg – Moscow, 1896–1918
