= Irakly Baratynsky =

Irakly Abramovich Baratynsky
- Ираклий Абрамович Баратынский
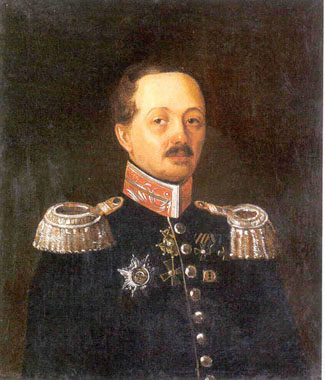

Kazan Governor
- In office March 14, 1846 – December 31, 1857
- Preceded by: Sergey Shipov
- Succeeded by: Pyotr Kozlyaninov

Yaroslavl Governor
- In office August 30, 1842 – March 14, 1846
- Preceded by: Konstantin Poltoratsky
- Succeeded by: Alexey Buturlin

Personal details
- Born: February 24, 1802 Vyazhlya, Kirsanovsky Uyezd, Tambov Governorate
- Died: May 4, 1859 (aged 57) Saint Petersburg
- Resting place: Novodevichye Cemetery of Saint Petersburg
- Spouse: Anna Abamelek
- Relations: Baratynskys
- Parents: Abram Baratynsky (father); Alexandra Cherepanova (mother)
- Education: Page Corps
- Awards: Order of Saint George; Golden Weapon "For Bravery"; Order of the White Eagle; Order of Saint Vladimir; Order of Saint Anna; Order of Saint Stanislaus; Virtuti Militari

Military service
- Allegiance: Russian Empire
- Branch/service: Cavalry
- Rank: Lieutenant General
- Battles/wars: Russian–Turkish War (1828–1829); Polish Uprising (1830–1831); Caucasian War (1840)

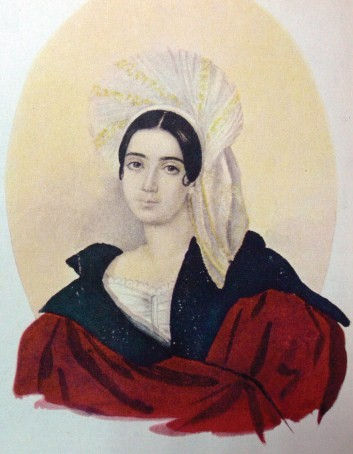
Anna Baratynskaya

Irakly Abramovich Baratynsky (Russian: Ира́клий Абра́мович Бараты́нский; February 24, 1802 – May 4, 1859) was a Russian soldier and statesman, a participant in the Russian–Turkish War of 1828–1829 and the Suppression of the Polish Uprising of 1830–1831, lieutenant general, Governor of Yaroslavl (1842–1846) and Kazan (1846–1857), and senator.

== Biography ==
Irakly Baratynsky was born on February 24, 1802, in the village of Vyazhlya of the Kirsanovsky District of the Tambov Governorate. Descended from the old Polish noble family of Boratynskys: the son of Lieutenant General and Senator Abram Andreevich (1767–1811) and the maid of honor Alexandra Feodorovna, née Cherepanova (1776–1852), brother of the poet Yevgeny Abramovich, uncle of the scientist Sergei Rachinsky. As an inheritance from his father, he received an estate in the Tambov Province with two hundred souls of serfs.

Educated at the Corps of Pages; on December 31, 1819, he was promoted to warrant officer and assigned to the Equestrian Jaeger of His Majesty the King of the Wiertemberg Regiment, from where on April 17, 1824, in the rank of lieutenant, he was transferred to the Courland Uhlan Regiment, and on January 1, 1827, he was appointed adjutant to the commander–in–chief of the 2nd Army, Count Wittgenstein.

The next year, with the rank of captain, Baratynsky took part in the Turkish War and distinguished himself in engagements against the Turks at the village of Boldanskoshty and during the imposition of the Brailov Fortress; sent to the vanguard under the command of Lieutenant–General Ridiger, he took part in the engagements of Kozludzhi and Yenibazar, for which he was awarded a Gold Saber with the Inscription "For Bravery". Then again he was with the commander–in–chief of the 2nd Army and participated on July 8 in offensive movements against the Shumly Fortress, and for the distinction he was transferred to the Life Guards Uhlan Regiment; then he distinguished himself in a number of battles during the siege and capture of the Fortress of Varna, for which he was awarded the Order of Saint Anna of the 3rd Degree with a Bow. On April 7, 1829, Baratynsky was appointed adjutant to the commander–in–chief, Count Dibich. In the Campaign of 1829, he was at the imposition of the Fortress of Silistria, then fought near the town of Bulanin and at the village of Kulevcha, for which he was awarded the Order of Saint Vladimir of the 4th Degree with a Bow. Then he took part in the battle of Dervillezhevol, for which he was awarded the Order of Saint Anna, 2nd Degree. He crossed the Balkan Mountains with the army and took part in the occupation of Adrianople, for which he was awarded the rank of captain.

During the Polish Uprising of 1831, Baratynsky, being in the corps of Count Palen, fought at the town of Kalushin, at Wavre, at Kalandzin and on the Grokhov Fields; for all these deeds he was awarded the Order of Saint Anne of the 2nd Degree with a Crown. Then he took part in repelling the sortie from Praga, in the movement of the main army to the Verkhona River, in the engagement on the Markhovec River, on the Isaka River, in the movement of the army from Siedlce to Minsk, in the engagement near Minsk, in the movement of the army to Ostrolenka, in the battle of the town of Nure and, finally, in the general battle at Ostrolenka, from where he was sent with a report to Saint Petersburg to the Tsar. For the Polish Campaign, Baratynsky was awarded in 1832 the Polish Insignia for Military Dignity of the 4th Degree.

On June 7, 1831, he was granted an aide–de–camp to His Majesty, and on July 20, 1831, he was sent to Vitebsk to accompany the body of Tsarevich Konstantin Pavlovich. Then he several times (in 1831, 1833, 1834, 1836, 1837 and 1839) received business trips to various provinces to observe the actions of recruits and the selection of recruits for the guard and was repeatedly awarded the Highest Grace for his zealous service. In 1834, he accompanied the Prussian prince Adalbert to the Prussian border. In the same year, he was transferred to the Life Guards Hussar Regiment, was awarded an annual salary of 2000 silver rubles, and from the next year he entered the front of the same regiment. Baratynsky carried his frontline service with outstanding zeal, and in less than two years (1835–1836) he was awarded the Highest Grace 25 times for the exact execution of the orders entrusted to him during the Highest reviews and maneuvers. On December 6, 1836, Baratynsky was promoted to colonel, retaining the rank of adjutant wing, and on February 1, 1838, he was expelled from the front. The following year, he had several business trips for the production of military court cases, as well as on the occasion of the Highest reviews. In the same 1839, he received the distinction of impeccable service for 15 years and orders: Saint Vladimir, 3rd Class and Saint George, 4th Class. In 1840, while in the Caucasus, Baratynsky participated in the capture of the forts occupied by the mountaineers on the Black Sea coast and in several reconnaissance, for which he was awarded a diamond ring with the monogram image of the Emperor. On July 12, 1842, he was sent to Kovno to meet the Archduke of Austria Karl Ferdinand.

On August 30, 1842, he was promoted to major general, with the appointment of executing the post of the Yaroslavl Governor. During his service in Yaroslavl, Baratynsky received the following favors: for the proper collection of taxes, he was declared the Monarch's favor on February 9, 1845; on July 12, 1845, 4300 rubles were granted to him in a lump sum; on July 20, 1845, he was ordered to be in the retinue of His Majesty, with the abandonment of his post; on January 14, 1846, he was assigned a surplus salary of 4000 silver rubles a year; on March 13, 1846, he was awarded the Order of Saint Stanislaus, 1st Degree.

On March 14, 1846, Baratynsky was appointed Kazan Governor. For about 12 years he ruled this region and for his successful actions in collecting state revenues and organizing troops, he was repeatedly awarded the Highest favor. Likewise, Baratynsky received expressions of gratitude from the Empress many times for his constant concern for the needs of orphanages in the Department of Empress Maria.

In May 1851, he destroyed in Kazan the center of the Kazan Old Believers – the church in the name of the icon of the Most Holy Theotokos "Joy of All Who Sorrow" ("Korovinskaya Prayer"). The church was demolished, the building materials left over from the demolition of the church were capitalized in the amount of 682 rubles 29 kopecks in silver. Old Believer icons and liturgical items were transferred to the Kazan Spiritual Consistory, which transferred them to the Cathedral.

In addition, he received the following awards in Kazan: in 1848 – a badge of distinction of blameless service for 20 years; on December 13, 1849 – Order of Saint Anna, 1st Degree; on December 6, 1851 – Order of Saint Anna, 1st Class with the Imperial Crown; on December 6, 1853, promoted to lieutenant general; on August 22, 1855, he received the distinction of impeccable service for 30 years; on December 31, 1855 – Order of Saint Vladimir, 2nd Degree; on January 7, 1857, he was granted a rent of 1,500 rubles a year for 6 years; on December 31, 1857, he was awarded the Order of the White Eagle and appointed to be present in the Senate, with the reservation on the army cavalry; from January 5, 1858, he was listed as present in the First Division of the 5th Department of the Senate, and during the vacation time of 1858, he was appointed to be present in the United Departments of the Senate.

Irakly Baratynsky died on May 4, 1859, being in the service. Buried in the Resurrection Novodevichy Convent in Saint Petersburg; the grave is lost.

== Family ==
Baratynsky was distinguished by a lively mind, courtesy and high education. From 1835, he was married to the maid of honor Princess Anna Abamelek (1814–1889). In her early youth she began to study literature and translated into French Kozlov's "Chernets" (published in Moscow in 1831: "Le Moine, Poeme de Kosloff, Traduit en Prose"). Her remarkable beauty and subtle mind have made her one of the wonderful members of modern literary circles. Pushkin, Kozlov, and Vyazemsky dedicated poems to her.

== Sources ==
- Baratynsky, Irakli Abramovich // Russian Biographical Dictionary: In 25 Volumes – Saint Petersburg, 1900 – Volume 2: Aleksinsky – Bestuzhev–Ryumin – Pages 494–496
- Evgeny Dolgov. Kazan Governor Irakly Baratynsky
