= Dmitry Mertvago =

Russian politician and military officer (1760–1824)

Dmitry Borisovich Mertvago
- Дмитрий Борисович Мертваго
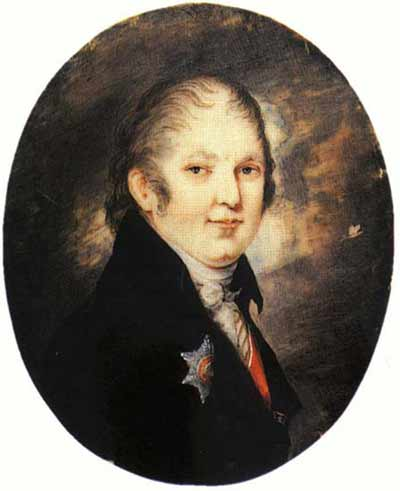

Tauride Governor
- In office 1803–1807
- Preceded by: Grigory Miloradovich
- Succeeded by: Andrey Borozdin

Personal details
- Born: 16 August 1760 Alatyr, Kazan Governorate, Russian Empire
- Died: 5 June 1824 (aged 63) Moscow, Russian Empire

Dmitry Borisovich Mertvago (Russian: Дми́трий Бори́сович Мертва́го; 16 August 1760, Mertovshchina village, near the town of Alatyr, Kazan Governorate, Russian Empire – 5 July 1824, Moscow) was a Russian official, senator, Privy Councillor (1817), Tauride Civil Governor (1803–07), Provisions Master General (1807–10), memoirist. Grandfather of Elizaveta Bezobrazova.

== Biography ==
Dmitry came from a noble family and received a home education. In 1774, he, along with his family, was captured by Yemelyan Pugachev, and Dmitry's father was hanged in his own village. In 1775, he entered the guard as a non-commissioned officer and joined the service in 1779 as a sergeant. From 1781, he worked in the civil service: first, as a prosecutor in Orenburg, then from 1786 as an adviser to the civil chamber in Ufa, and from 1787 as an adviser to the Ufa provincial government.

He married one of the daughters of state councilor Mark Poltoratsky. From 1797, he served in the Provisional Expedition of the College of War in St. Petersburg and was promoted to major general. In early 1802, he retired.

At the end of 1802, under the patronage of Gavrila Derzhavin (then Minister of Justice), he was appointed chief overseer of the Crimean salt lakes. In December 1803 – October 1807, the Taurian civil governor. Since 1807, Provisions Master General, head of the Provision Department of the War Ministry. In this position, he repeatedly clashed with the Minister of War Aleksey Arakcheyev. In 1810, he was dismissed from service and lived in his estate in the Tver province.

In 1817, he was appointed senator to Moscow; in 1818, under the personal order of Emperor Alexander I, he headed a senatorial audit investigating abuses committed by the administrations of Vladimir, Astrakhan, and Caucasus provinces. In the last years of his life, he maintained close relations with the Archbishop of Moscow and Kolomna Philaret Drozdov.

== Memoirs ==
From 1807, at the insistence of Derzhavin, Mertvago began working on the "Notes" in which he described the events of the Pugachev's Rebellion, the reign of Emperor Paul I, and he gave portraits of prominent statesmen of the late 18th – early 19th centuries.

== Bibliography ==
- Mertvago, Dmitry (1760–1824). Notes.

== Sources ==
- Aksakov, Sergey (1857). Memories of Dmitriy Mertvago. The Russian Messenger.
- Arnoldov, Mikhail (1868). Dmitriy Mertvago. Simbirsk: Collection of historical and statistical materials about Simbirsk province.
- Kravchuk, Alexander (2012). Dmitry Borisovich Mertvago as a Taurian civilian governor. Scientific notes of the Vernadsky Tauride National University. pp. 116–127.
- Kravchuk, Alexander (2011). To the biography of Tavrichesky Governor Dmitry Mertvago. Kiev: Third Zarembiv Readings: Materials of the Third All-Ukrainian Zaremche Scientific Readings "Ukrainian Memory of the Matter: Modern Problems and Trends" dedicated to the 20th Anniversary of the Center of Memorization of the NAS of Ukraine and UTOPIK, Kyiv, May 23, 2011. pp. 77–85.
- Kravchuk, Alexander (2011). "The states of the spiritual rule of Mohammedan law and the rules for the production and the duties of the spiritual" of Governor Dmitry Mertvago. Kiev: Third Zarembiv Readings: Materials of the Third All-Ukrainian Zaremche Scientific Readings "Ukrainian Memory of the Matter: Modern Problems and Trends" dedicated to the 20th Anniversary of the Center of Memorization of the NAS of Ukraine and UTOPIK, Kyiv, May 23, 2011. pp. 126–132.
- Kravchuk, Alexander (2012). Governor Dmitry Mertvago and the re-establishment of industrial viticulture in the South-Eastern Crimea. Current Issues of History, Culture and Ethnography of the South-Eastern Crimea: Proceedings of the IV International Scientific Conference. pp. 53–58.
- Kravchuk, Alexander (2016). On the history of the administrative practices of Tavricheskaya civil governor Dmitry Borisovich Mertvago (1803–1807). Electronic scientific publication Almanac "Space and Time".
- Russian life in the memoirs of contemporaries of the 18th century. Moscow. 2012. pp. 646–663.
