= Anna Davidovna Abamelik-Lazareva =

Russian-Armenian translator (1814–1889)

Anna Davidovna Abamelek Աննա Դավթի Աբամելիք
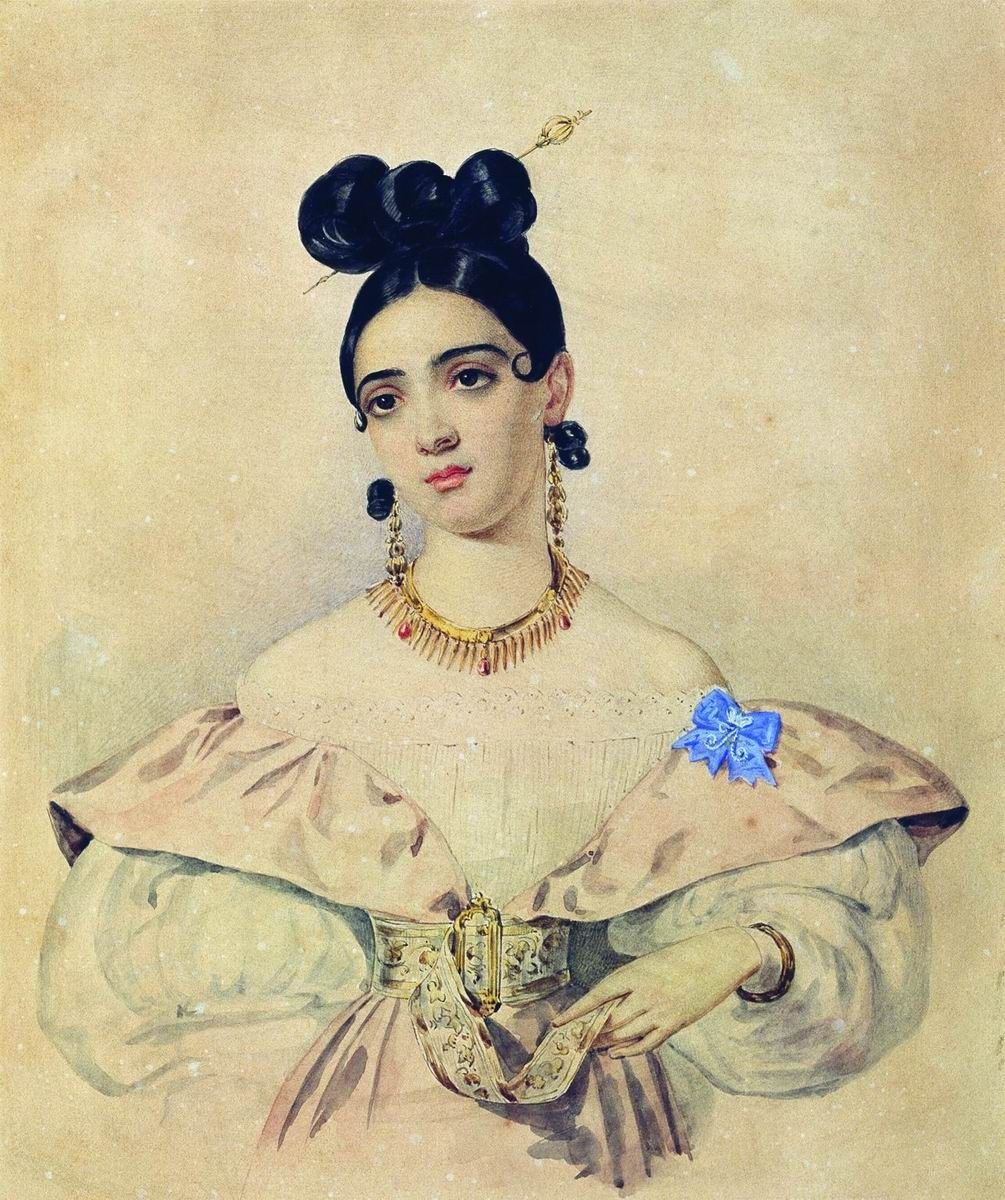
- Born: April 15, 1814; Saint-Petersburg, Russian Empire
- Died: November 25, 1889 (aged 75); Saint-Petersburg
- Occupations: translator, public figure
- Spouse: Irakli Baratinsky
- Father: David Semyonovich Abamelik
- Awards: Order of Saint Catherine

Anna Davidovna Abamelek (Armenian: Աննա Դավիդովնա Աբամելեկ) Baratinskaya, born on April 15, 1814, in Saint-Petersburg into the noble Abamelik family of Armenian origin. Anna was a Russian-Armenian translator, lady-in-waiting, socialite and public figure.

She was the daughter of David Semyonovich Abamelik. She married Irakli Baratinsky, who was the governor of Kazan and the brother of Russian poet Yevgeny Baratynsky.

Abamelik-Lazareva was a friend and translator of Alexander Pushkin. She knew English, French, Armenian and German. She translated poems by Pushkin, Mikhail Lermontov, and others, and published them in Europe; she also translated some prominent European poets into Russian.

In her time, she was regarded as one of the most beautiful women in Russia.

== Sources ==
- Armenian Concise Encyclopedia, Ed. by acad. K. Khudaverdian, Yerevan, 1990, Vol. 1, p. 8
