= Utkina Dacha =

18th-century architectural ensemble in St. Petersburg

Coordinates: 59°56′05″N 30°25′22″E

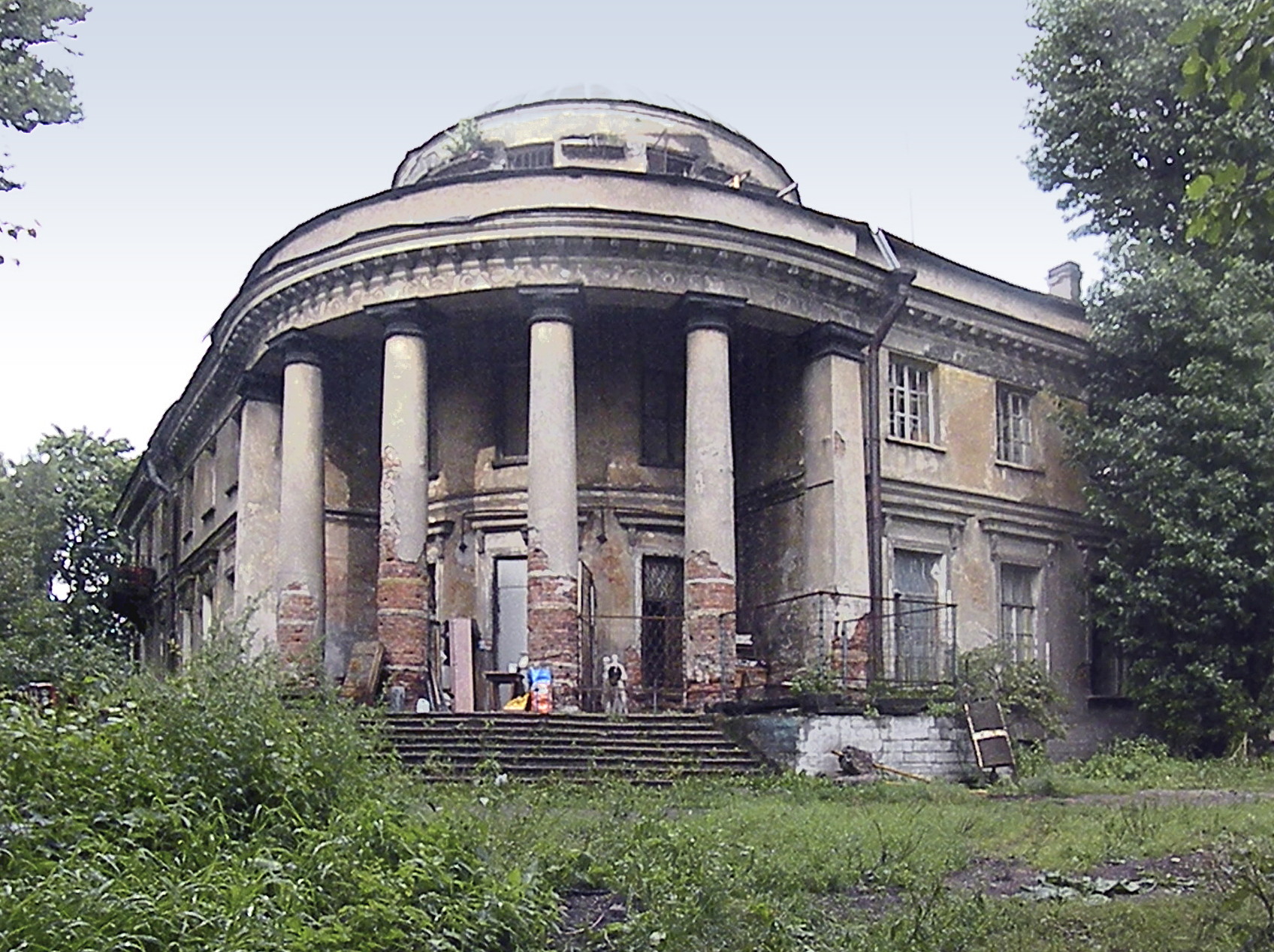
Main building of Utkina Dacha

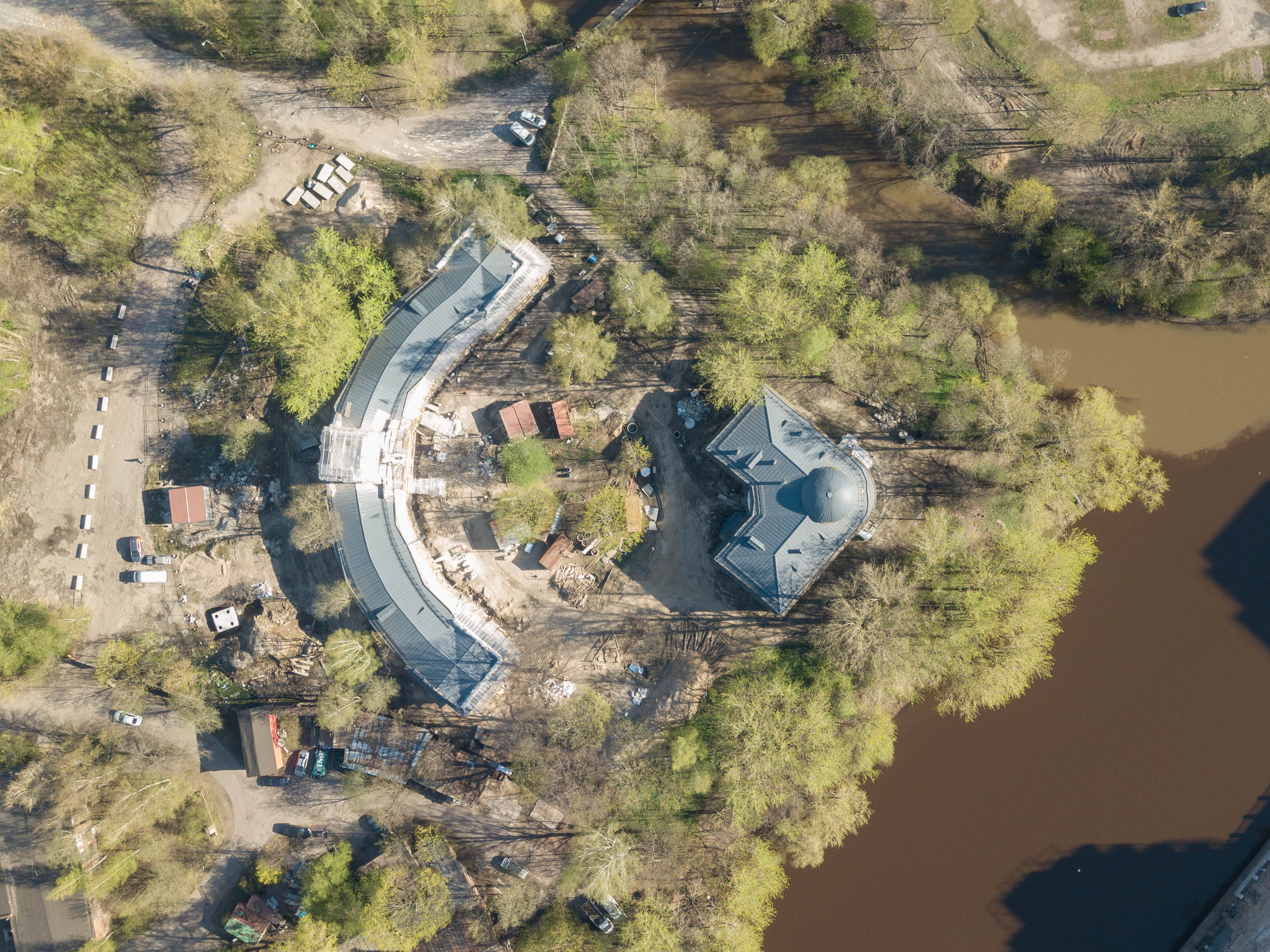
Aerial view

Utkina Dacha (Utkin's Dacha, Russian: Уткина дача) is an 18th-century architectural ensemble in St. Petersburg, at the junction of the Okkervil and the Okhta rivers. It is included in Russian cultural heritage register under number 7810250000. As of 2019 the neglected building is a branch of a museum (ru:Государственный музей городской скульптуры).

Prior to the founding of St. Petersburg this land near the Nyenschantz fortress was owned by Swedish colonel Okkervil. Later the chief of the Secret Chancellery general Andrey Ushakov became an owner. In the middle of the 18th century this land was granted to Agafokleya Poltoratskaya and her husband Mark Poltoratsky as an award for their involvement in opera productions.

The Manor of Okkervil was managed by their daughter Agafokleya Sukhareva, who also owned the neighboring site upstream the river Okhta. One of their daughters, Elizabeth, became the wife of Alexey Olenin, the future president of the Imperial Academy of Arts. Alexander Pushkin fell in love with another their daughter, Anna Olenina, granddaughter of Poltoratsky. Pushkin asked for her hand in the summer of 1828, but was turned down.

There is a speculation that the designer of the manor was the famous architect Nikolay Lvov. In the 1820–1830s a service building was erected.

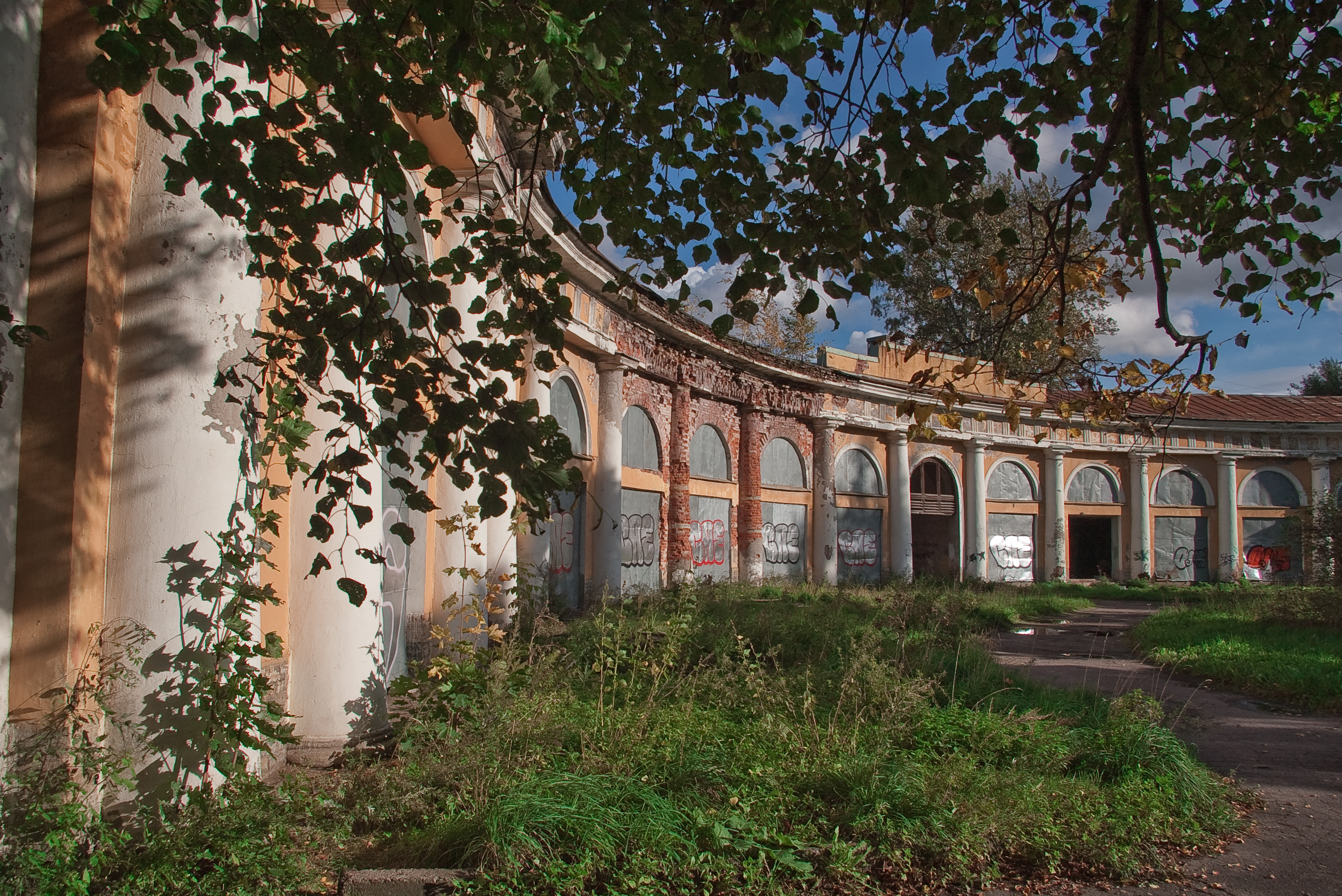
Service building of Utkina Dacha

After the 1917 Russian Revolution, the estate passed to the Commissariat of Health, and housed Malookhtinsky office of the 2nd psychiatric hospital. In the late 1930s, parts of the buildings were re-planned for residential apartments, while other premises were used by various institutions.
