= E. M. Almedingen =

English author, biographer and lecturer

- Born: Marta Aleksandrovna Almedingen; 21 July 1898; Saint Petersburg, Russian Empire
- Died: 5 March 1971 (aged 72); England
- Resting place: St James Churchyard, Ashwick, Somerset, England
- Occupations: Biographer, children's author, novelist
- Parents: Alexander Almedingen (father); Olga Sergeevna (mother)

E. M. Almedingen (born Marta Aleksandrovna Almedingen, also known as Martha Edith Almedingen or von Almedingen; 21 July 1898 – 5 March 1971) was a British novelist, biographer, children's author, and member of the Royal Society of Literature.

== Family ==
On her mother's side, she was descended from the aristocratic Poltoratsky family; her maternal grandfather was Serge Poltoratzky, the literary scholar and bibliophile who ended his days in exile, shuttling between France and England. His second wife, Ellen Sarah Southee, the daughter of an English gentleman farmer, grew up in Kent, and was related to poet Robert Southey. Their children had English governesses and grew up speaking English. Their daughter and the novelist's mother, Olga Sergeevna, grew up in Kent— but, fascinated by her father's native Russian, moved to Russia in 1800s. There, she married Alexander Almedingen, who had turned his back on his family's military traditions to become a scientist.

== Early life ==
After her father abandoned his family in 1900, they increasingly lived in impoverishment. Despite this, the author was able to attend the Kseniinsky Institute in 1913 and eke out a living in the increasingly desperate times of the Russian revolution and civil war. She received the highest honors in history and literature at Kseniinsky. She transferred from Kseniinsky to Petrograd University in 1916, where she attended until she earned her first doctorate in 1920.

== Career ==
From 1920, Almedingen taught English history and literature at Petrograd University. She then emigrated to England in 1923, where she began work as a journalist. She settled in Shropshire, living initially at Worfield, and later at Church Stretton by time of the Second World War.

In parallel, she dabbled in fiction writing with works such as “An Examination in Diplomacy”, before ultimately going on to publish upwards of 60 books over the next several decades. Despite her wide range of work from biography to poetry, she became well known for her children's novels in particular. Almedingen wrote two historical novels: The Lion of the North (1938), about Charles XII of Sweden, and Fair Haven (1956), about Peter the Great. In 1951, she became a lecturer in Russian literature at Oxford University.

In 1941 she won the $5,000 Atlantic Monthly nonfiction prize for one of her autobiographical works, Tomorrow Will Come. Five years later she moved to Frogmore, a house near Upton Magna in Shropshire, where she remained until her death.

== Bibliography ==
=== Fiction ===
- “An Examination in Diplomacy” (1929)
- Young Catherine (1938)
- The Lion of the North: Charles XII, King of Sweden (1938)
- She Married Pushkin (1939)
- Frossia (1943)
- Dasha (1944)
- The Golden Sequence (1949; Published in England as The Inmost Heart)
- Flame on the Water (1952)
- Stand Fast, Beloved City (1954)
- Life of Many Colours: The Story of Grandmother Ellen; US edition: A Very Far Country (1958)
- Fair Haven (1956)
- Stephen's Light (1956)
- The Scarlet Goose (1957)
- The Little Stairway; US edition: Winter in the Heart (1960)
- Dark Splendour (1961)
- One Little Tree: A Christmas Card of a Finnish Landscape (1963)
- The Knights of the Golden Table (1963)
- The Treasure of Siegfried (1964)
- The Ladies at St. Hedwig's (1965)
- Little Katia (1966)
- The Story of Gudrun; based on the Third Part of the Epic of Gudrun (1967)
- Young Mark: The Story of a Venture (1967)
- Candle at Dusk (1969)
- Too Early Lilac (1970)
- Ellen (1970)
- The Crimson Oak (1983)

=== Non-fiction ===
- The Catholic Church in Russia today (1923)
- The English Pope (Adrian IV) (1925)
- Pilgrimage of a Soul (1934)
- Through Many Windows Opened by the Book of Common Prayer (1935)
- From Rome to Canterbury (1937)
- Tomorrow Will Come (1941, 1961, 1964)
- Dom Benard Clements: A Portrait (1945)
- The Almond Tree (1947)
- Within the Harbour (1950)
- Late Arrival (1952)
- So Dark a Stream: A Study of the Emperor Paul I of Russia, 1754-1801 (1959)
- The Young Pavlova (1960)
- Catherine: Empress of Russia (1961)
- The Empress Alexandra, 1872-1918: A Study (1961)
- The Emperor Alexander II: A Study (1962)
- Catherine the Great: A Portrait (1963)
- The Young Leonardo da Vinci (1963)
- The Emperor Alexander I (1964)
- A Picture History of Russia (1964)
- An Unbroken Unity: A Memoir of Grand Duchess Serge of Russia, 1864-1918 (1964)
- The Young Catherine the Great (1965)
- Retreat from Moscow (1966)
- The Romanovs: Three Centuries of an Ill-Fated Dynasty (1966)
- St. Francis of Assisi (1967)
- Charlemagne: A Study (1968)
- I Remember St. Petersburg (1969)
- Rus into Muscovy: The History of Early Russia (1971); US edition: Land of Muscovy: The History of Early Russia (1972)
- Anna (1972)

=== Poetry ===
- Poloniae Testamentum (1942)
- Out of Seir (1943)
- The Unnamed Stream and Other Poems (1965)

=== Plays ===
- Storm at Westminster: A Play in Twelve Scenes (1952)

=== Compilations ===
- Russian Fairy Tales (1958)
- Russian Folk and Fairy Tales (1963)
- Fanny (Frances Hermione de Poltoratzky, 1850-1916) (1970)

=== Translations ===
- The Lord's Passion (1940)
