= List of leaders of the Yaroslavl Governorate =

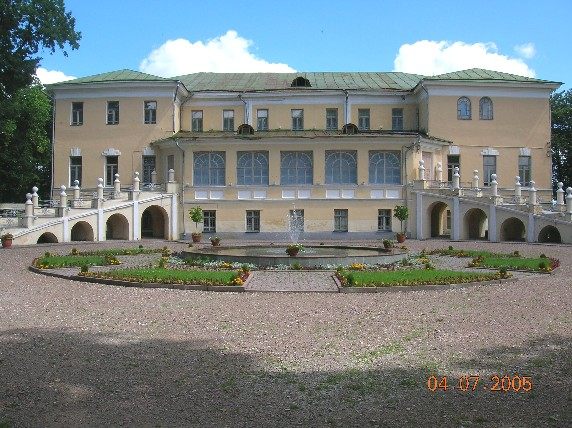
The residence of the governors of Yaroslavl – Governor's house on the Volga embankment

== Yaroslavl Governorship ==
Governors-general

- Alexey Melgunov (1777–1788)
- Yevgeny Kashkin (1788–1793)
- Peter Lopukhin (1794–1796)
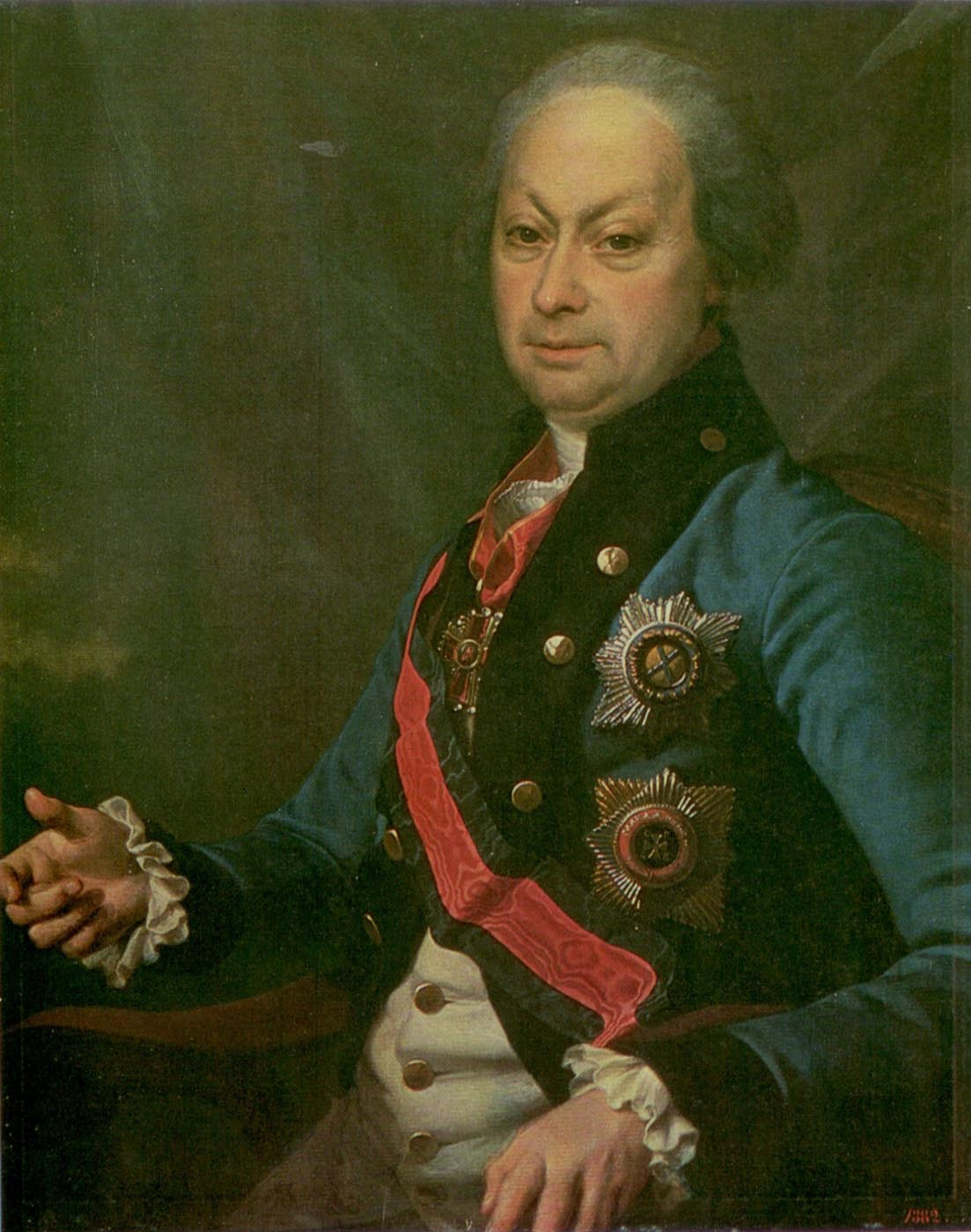
Alexey Melgunov

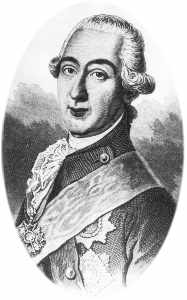
Evgeny Kashkin

Governors

- Ivan Zaborovsky (1777–1781)
- Ivan Golokhvastov (1781–1793)
- Nikita Urusov (1793–1797)

== Yaroslavl Governorate before the revolution ==
The leaders of the Yaroslavl Governorate before the revolution.

Governors

- Lev Tredyakovsky (September 10, 1797 – December 11, 1797)
- Nikolai Aksakov (December 11, 1797 – January 8, 1799)
- Mikhail Aksakov (January 8, 1799 – November 1, 1800)
- Vasily Sludin (November 2, 1800 – June 10, 1801)
- Mikhail Golitsyn (June 10, 1801 – January 12, 1817)
- Gabriel Politkovsky (February 1, 1817 – February 12, 1820)
- Alexander Bezobrazov (February 16, 1820 – November 25, 1826)
- Michael Bravin (November 25, 1826 – January 28, 1830)
- Konstantin Poltoratsky (January 29, 1830 – July 17, 1842)
- Anton Myasoyedov (Acting Governor: November 16, 1830 – December 9, 1830, May 14–16, 1834, July 27–29, 1841)
- Irakli Baratynsky (August 30, 1842 – March 14, 1846)
- Alexey Buturlin (June 1, 1846 – January 1, 1861)
- Alexey Obolensky (January 8, 1861 – May 9, 1861)
- Ivan Unkovsky (June 28, 1861 – March 17, 1877)
- Nikolay Schmidt (April 3, 1877 – December 9, 1878)
- Nikolay Bezak (December 30, 1878 – February 2, 1880)
- Vladimir Levshin (February 2, 1880 – April 1, 1887)
- Alexey Friede (May 21, 1887 – July 9, 1897)
- Boris Stürmer (July 30, 1896 – August 10, 1902)
- Alexey Rogovich (August 10, 1902 – October 18, 1905)
- Alexander Rimsky-Korsakov (November 8, 1905 – May 20, 1909)
- Dmitry Tatishchev (June 7, 1909 – October 20, 1915)
- Sergey Evreinov (November 11, 1915 – October 16, 1916)
- Nikolai Obolensky (November 1, 1916 – March 3, 1917)
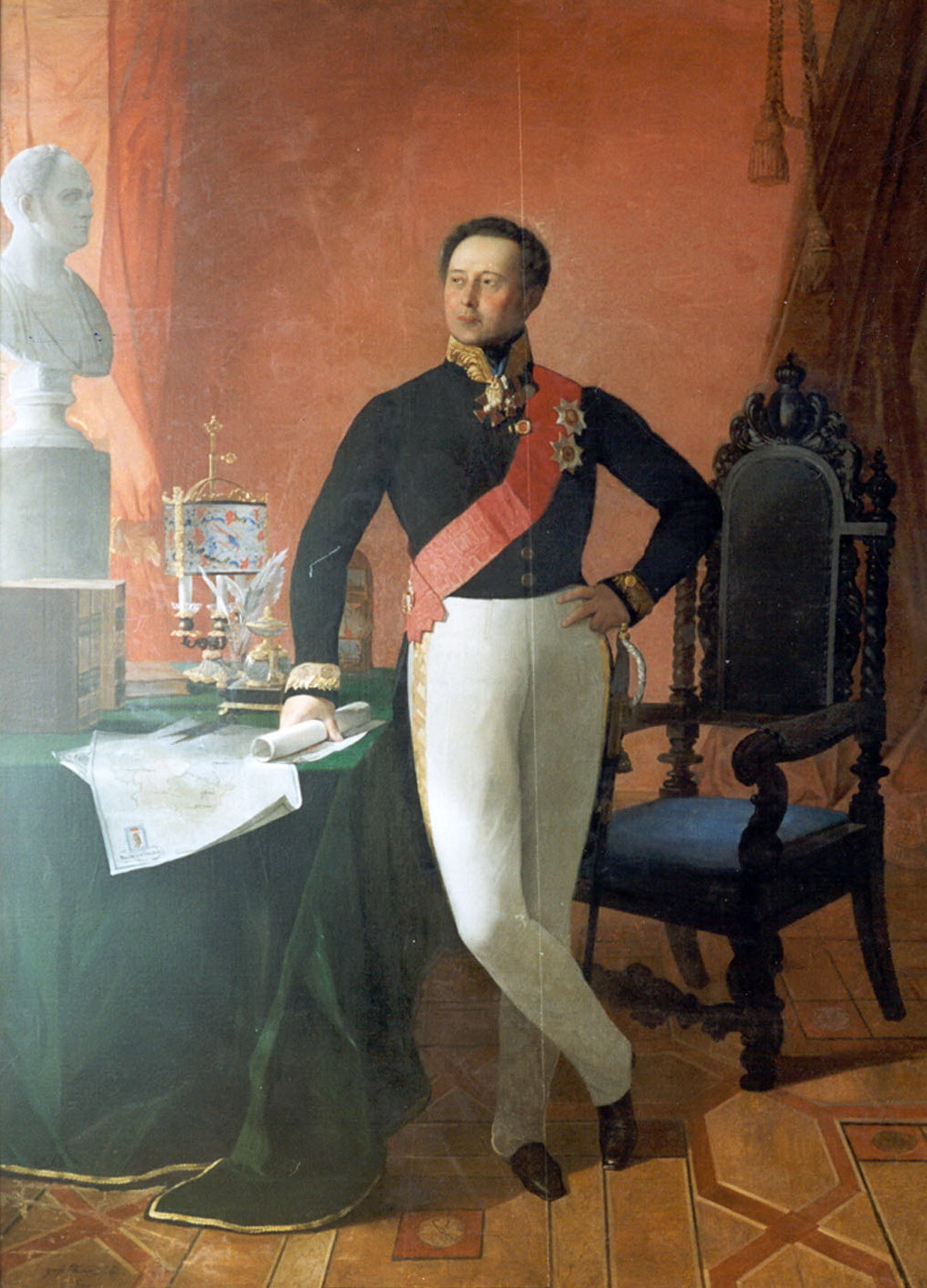
Alexander Bezobrazov

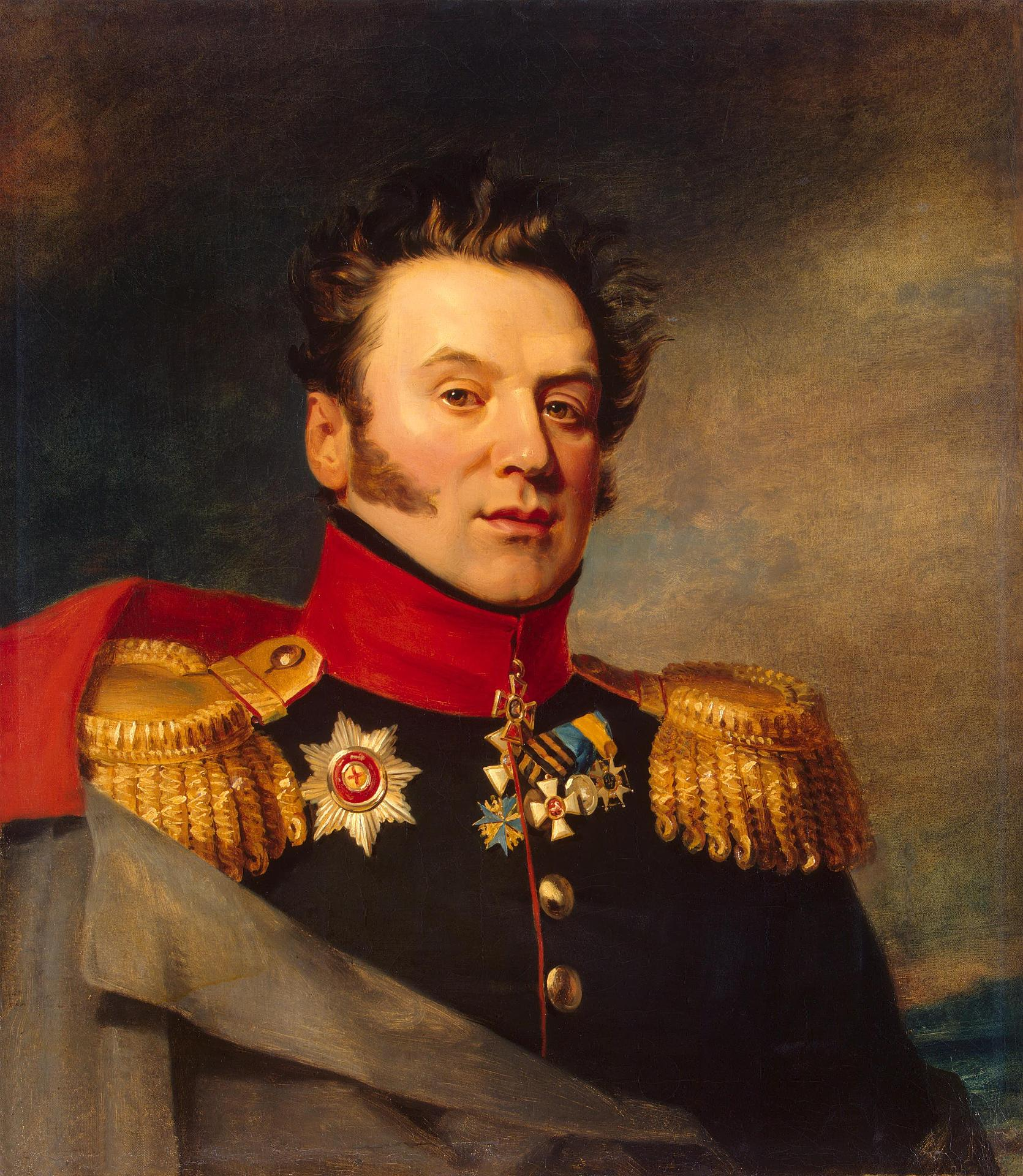
Konstantin Poltoratsky

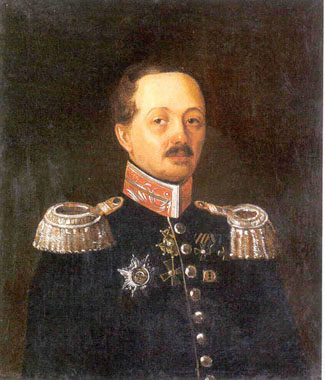
Irakli Baratynsky

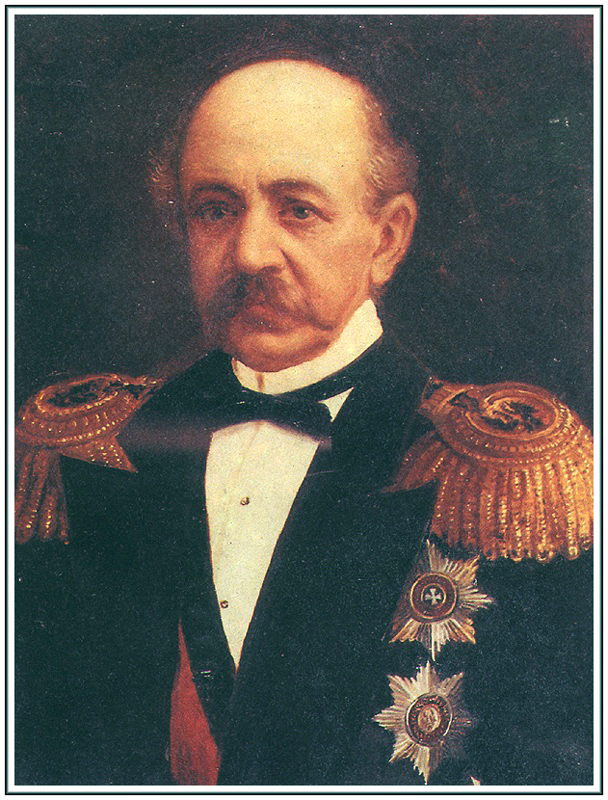
Ivan Unkovsky

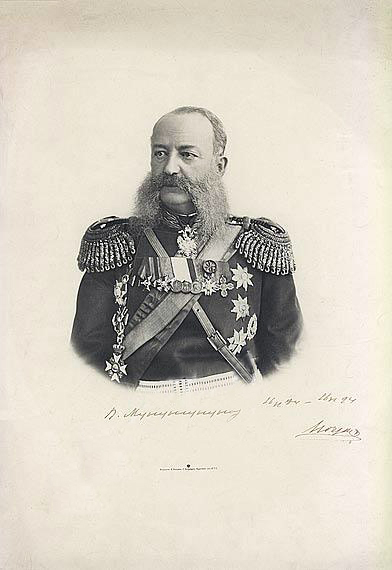
Nikolay Bezak

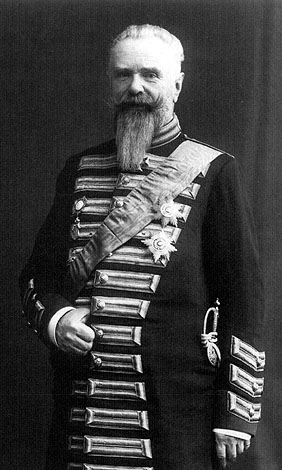
Boris Stürmer

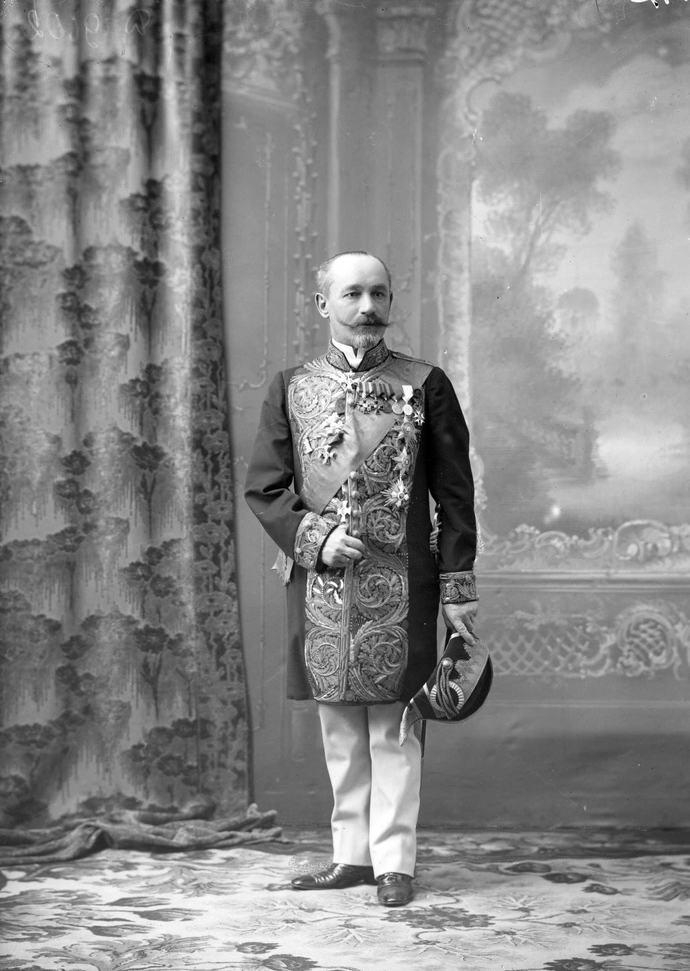
Alexey Rogovich

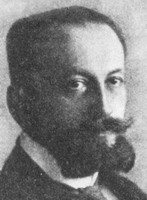
Sergey Evreinov

Provincial leaders of the nobility

- Nikolai Maikov (1805–1814)
- Vladimir Filatyev (1815 – December 11, 1826)
- Pavel Sokolov (December 11, 1826 – January 14, 1830)
- Semyon Urusov (January 14, 1830 – December 21, 1832)
- Michael Selifontov (December 21, 1832 – June 27, 1835)
- Andrey Glebov (January 23, 1836 – January 22, 1842)
- Alexander Glebov (January 22, 1842 – December 17, 1853)
- Peter Bem (December 17, 1853 – December 16, 1859)
- Nikolay Yakovlev (December 16, 1859 – October 3, 1860)
- Ivan Osokin (October 3, 1860 – December 19, 1862)
- Nikolay Skrynitsin (January 4, 1863 – January 24, 1878)
- Victor Kalachov (February 4, 1878 – August 22, 1882)
- Vasily Shakhovskoy (February 16, 1884 – February 8, 1896)
- Sergey Mikhalkov (February 8, 1896 – 1905)
- Ivan Kurakin (February 22, 1906 – 1915)
- Gennady Kalachov (1915–1917)
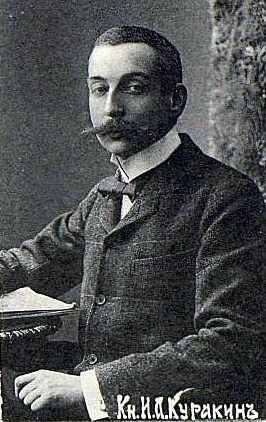
Ivan Kurakin

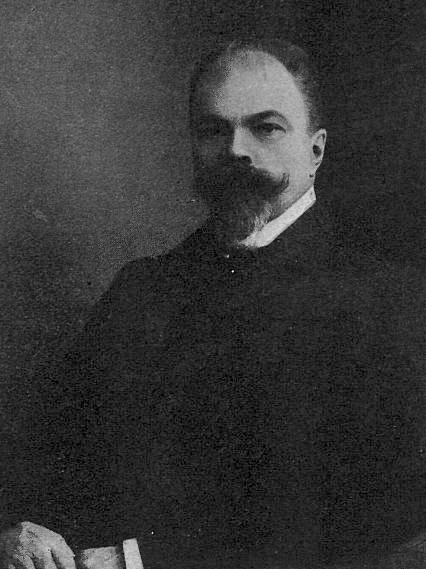
Gennady Kalachov

== Yaroslavl Governorate after the revolution ==
The leaders of the Yaroslavl Governorate after the revolution.

Provincial commissars

- Konstantin Chernosvitov (March 5, 1917 – August 2, 1917)
- Boris Duchesne (August 2, 1917 – September 28, 1917)
- Urusov (1917 – December 1917)

Military leaders

- Dmitry Garnovsky (November 10, 1917 – ?) – Chairman of the Military Revolutionary Committee
- Kirill Babich (July 11, 1918 – September 2, 1918) – Chairman of the Provincial Revolutionary Committee
- Alexander Perkhurov (July 6, 1918 – July 22, 1918) – the head of the anti-Bolshevik administration during the Yaroslavl uprising

Chairpersons of the Regional Council Executive Committee

- Nikolai Dobrokhotov (November 4, 1917 – June 2, 1918)
- Semyon Nakhimson (June 2, 1918 – July 6, 1918)
- Vacancy (July 6, 1918 – September 1918)
- Nikolai Pozharov (July 1918 – December 1918)
- Peter Rayevsky (December 1918 – April 1919)
- Ivan Tsvetkov (April 1919 – July 1919)
- Nikolai Dobrokhotov (Acting, July 1919)
- Ivan Rumyantsev (1919–1920)
- Reuben Levin (1922)
- Ilya Shelekhes (June 20, 1922 – February 1924)
- Yakov Egorov (February 1924 – November 1924)
- Vasily Korolev (November 1924 – ?)
- Mikhail Boldyrev (December 1928 – 1929)

Chairs, since 1920, Responsible Secretaries of the Provincial Committee of the Bolshevik Party

- Alexander Dadukin (May 1920 – January 1921)
- Semyon Berg (September 1918 – February 1919)
- Ivan Tsvetkov (February 1919 – April 1919)
- Peter Rayevsky (April 1919 – May 1919)
- Edward Lepin (May 1919 – October 1919)
- Nikolay Rostopchin (October 1919 – May 1920)
- Mikhail Ivanov (May 1920 – January 1921)
- Vladimir Ivanov (January 1921 – July 1921)
- Ivan Nevsky (June 1921 – December 1922)
- Ivan Kabakov (December 1922 – February 1924)
- Ilya Shelekhes (February 1924 – November 1924)
- Yakov Egorov (November 1924 – April 1925)
- Vasily Stroganov (April 1925 – October 1927)
- Yakov Bykin (October 1927 – July 1929)
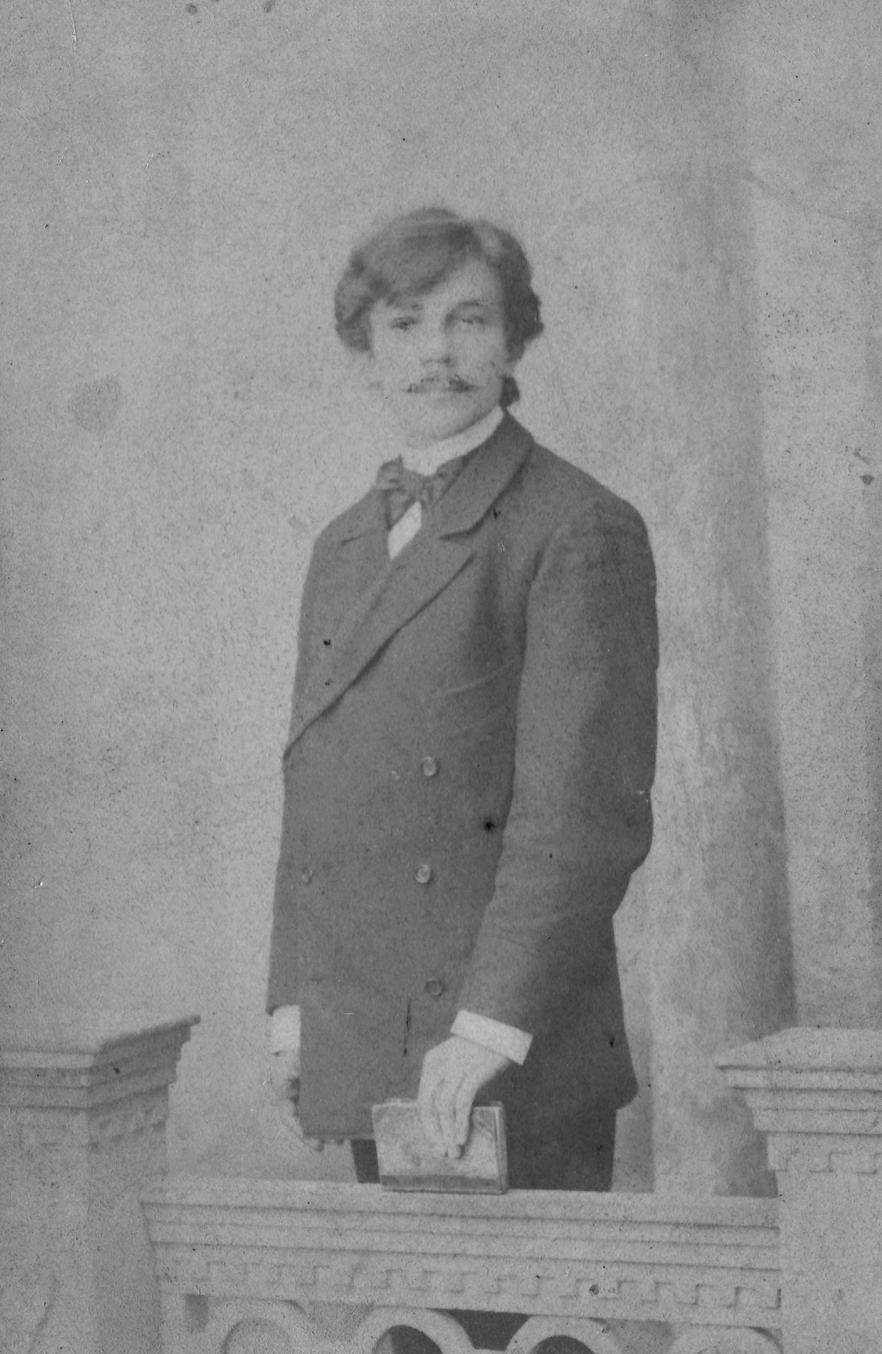
Nikolai Dobrokhotov

== See also ==
- Georgy Oldenburgsky – Governor-General of Tver, Yaroslavl and Novgorod

== Sources ==
- Yaroslavl Province Handbook of the History of the Communist Party and the Soviet Union
- List of rulers of Yaroslavl
- Victoria Marasanova, Fedyuk. Yaroslavl governors. 1777–1917. Yaroslavl, 1998.
