= Platon Tyurin =

Russian painter

- Платон Тюрин
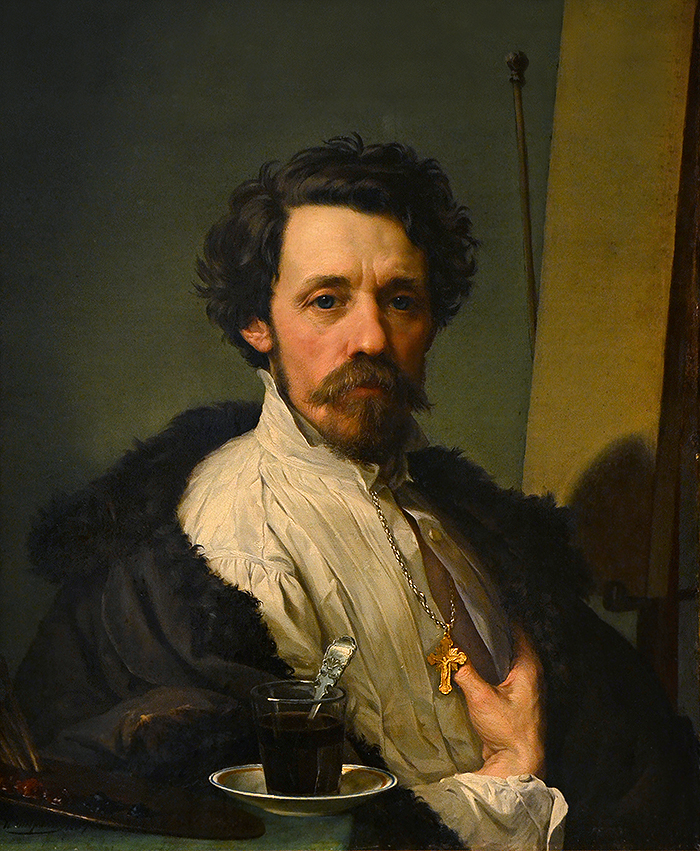
- Self Portrait (1857)
- Born: November 7, 1816; Vologda Governorate
- Died: August 6, 1882 (aged 65); Vologda
- Education: Imperial Academy of Arts (1850); Member Academy of Arts (1857)
- Known for: Painting
- Style: Classicism

Platon Semyonovich Tyurin (Russian: Платон Семёнович Тюрин; 19 November [O.S. 7 November] 1816 – 18 August [O.S. 6 August] 1882) was a Russian portrait painter and muralist. He was a member of the Imperial Academy of Arts.

== Biography ==
He was born to a family of serfs and was given his freedom in 1843. Two years later, he went to Saint Petersburg, where he audited classes at the Imperial Academy of Arts and studied with Alexey Markov. In 1850, he was awarded the title of "Artist" for historical and portrait painting. From 1850 to 1860, he was a regular exhibitor at the academy. In 1857, he was named an "Academician" for portraiture and received the title of "Titular Councilor" (a civil service position).

After 1860, his work was intimately connected with Vologda and the surrounding region. he received orders for portraits from all the local landowning families, including the Zubovs, as well as the clergy and other notable citizens. Throughout the 1860s, he received commissions to paint icons at local churches and, in 1862, his former manorial lords invited him to paint a church on their estate in the Gryazovetsky District.

He also worked at the church of Quriaqos and Julietta in nearby Tolstikovo, where Sergei Yesenin would later marry his first wife, Zinaida Reich. The building was demolished during the Soviet period.

In 1865, Tyurin married a local peasant woman. From 1876 to 1877, he was one of the artists who participated in decorating the new Cathedral of Christ the Saviour, creating 34 icons. Overtaxed physically by his work there, he was ill for several years and died of tuberculosis in 1882.

== Works ==
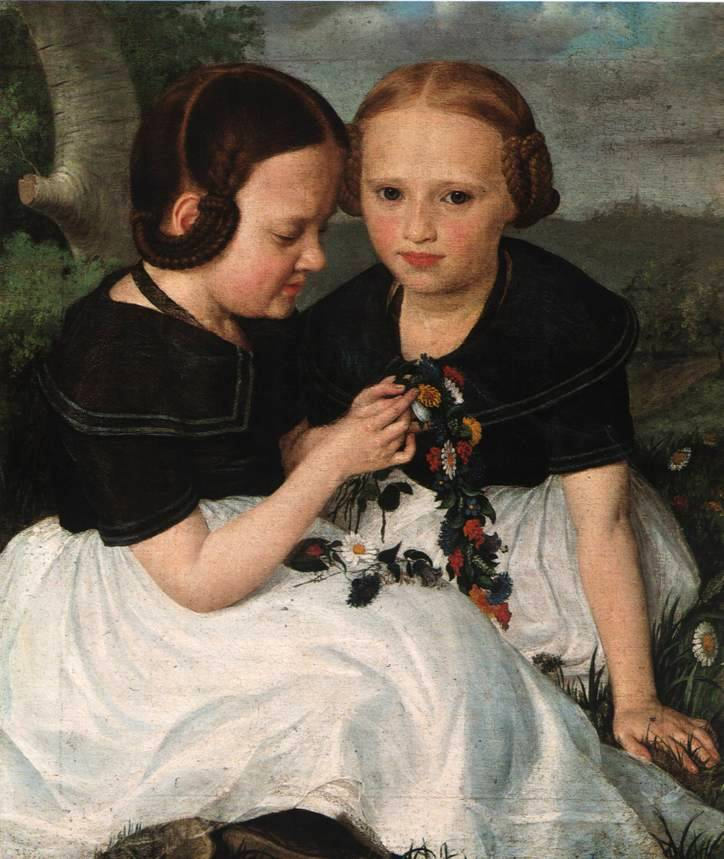
The Zaytsev Sisters

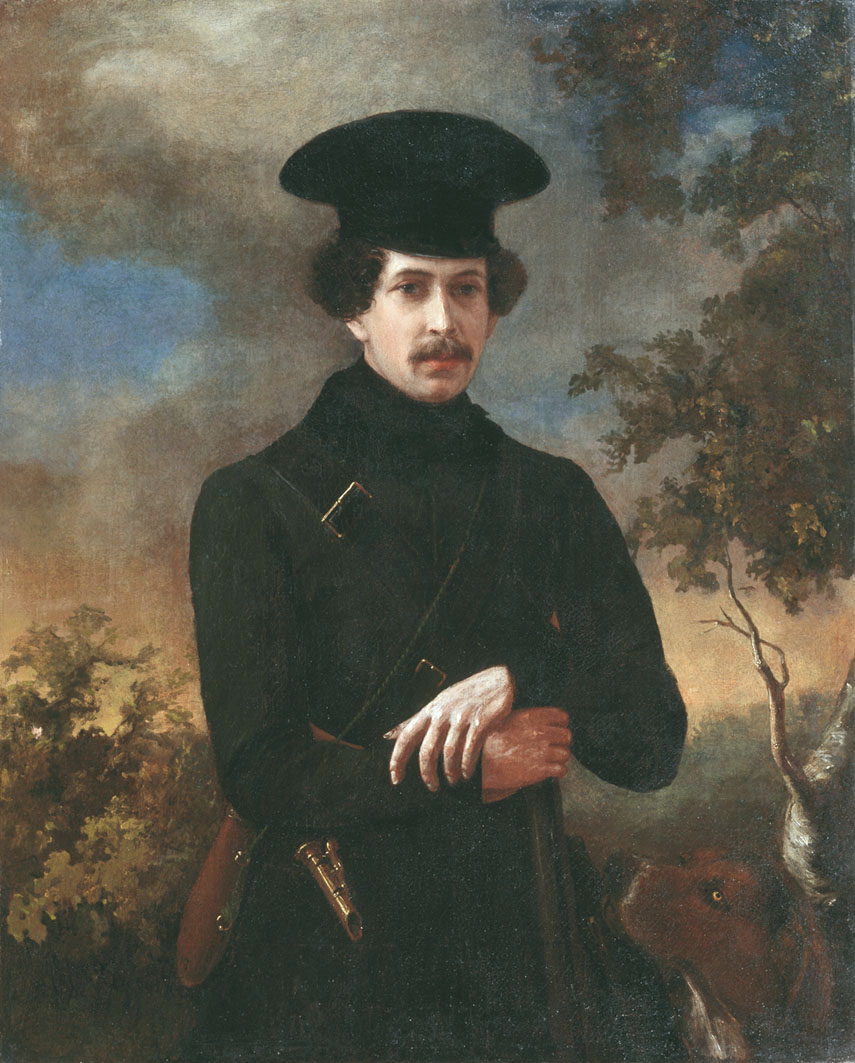
Portrait of S. A. Zubov

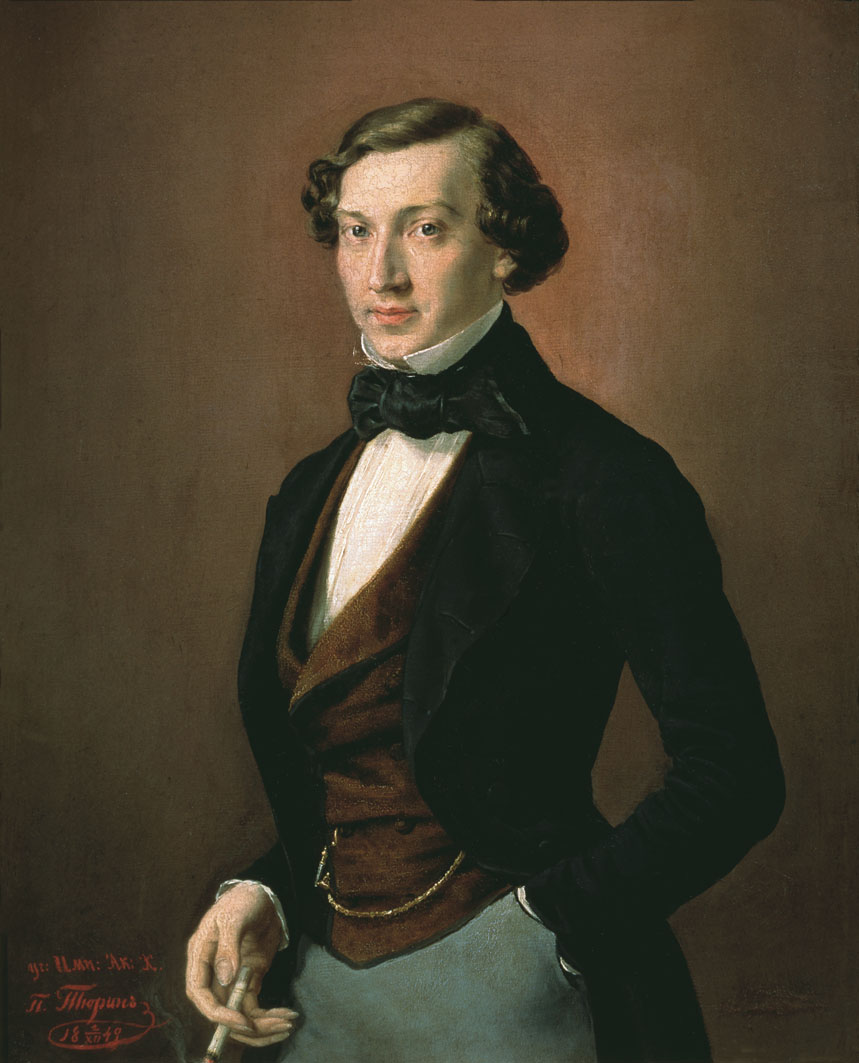
Male portrait (1849)

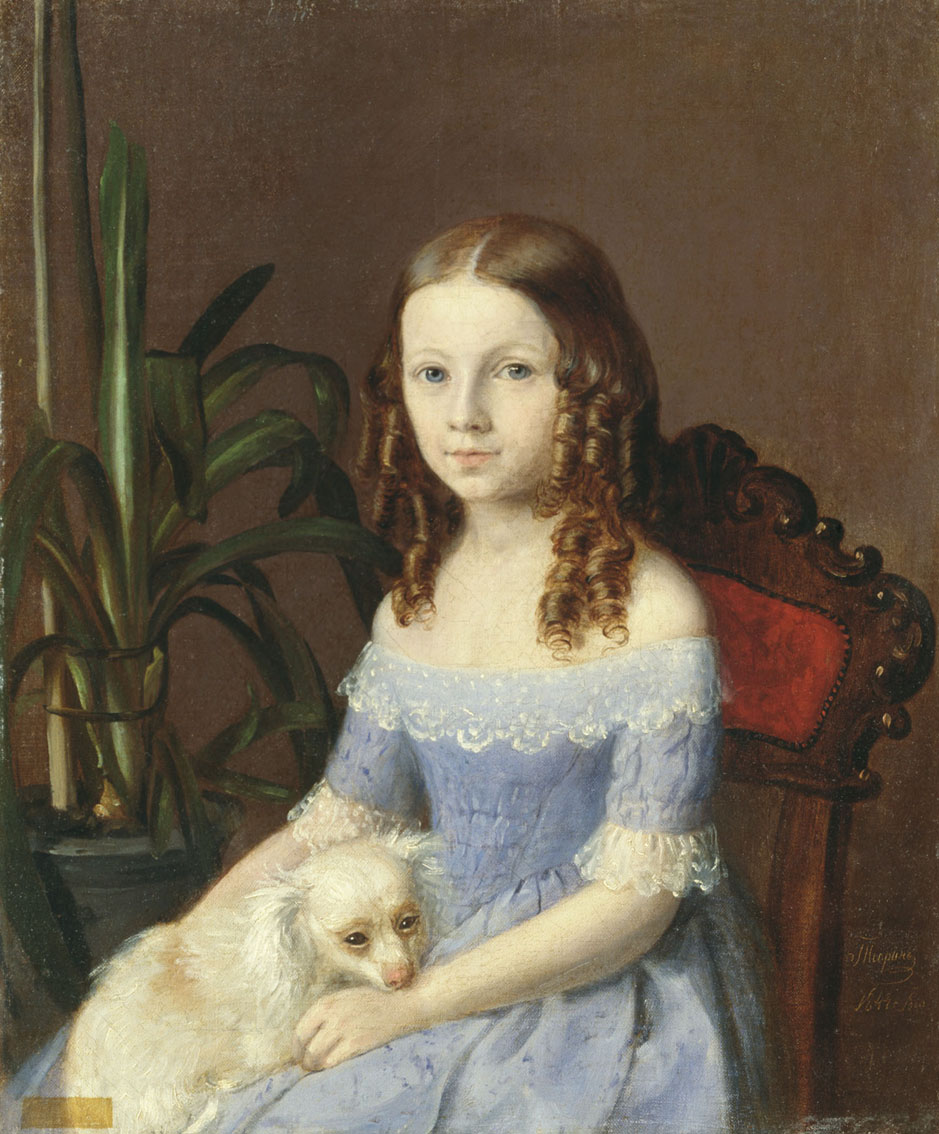
Portrait of a girl in a blue dress (1844)

== Literary sources ==
- С. Н. Кондаков (1915). Юбилейный справочник Императорской Академии художеств. 1764-1914 (in Russian). Vol. 2. p. 202.
