= Mark Poltoratsky =

Russian opera singer (1729–1795)

Mark Fedorovich Poltoratsky
- Марк Фёдорович Полторацкий
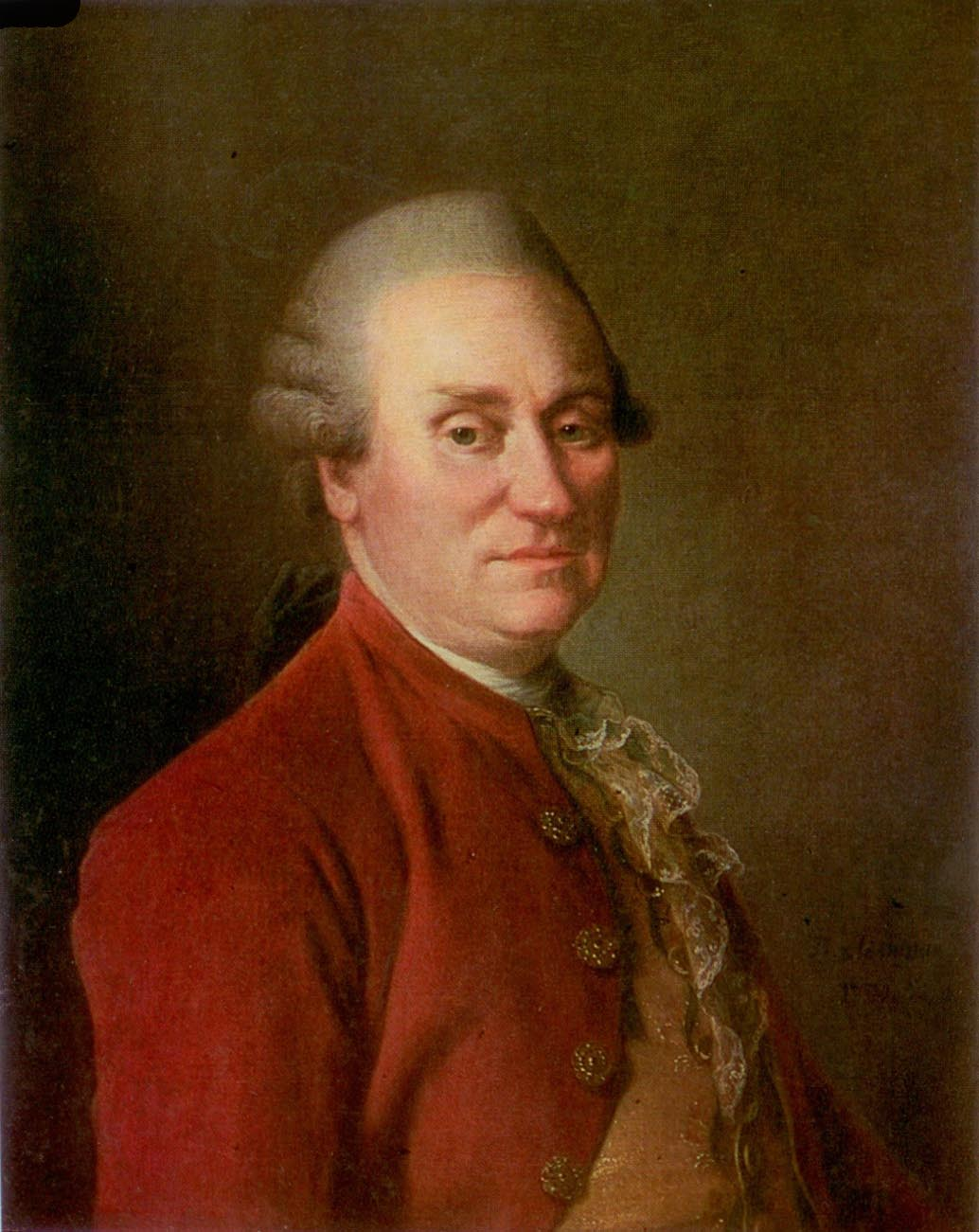
- Portrait of Mark Poltoratsky by Dmitry Levitzky
- Born: 28 April 1729; Sosnitsa, Kiev Governorate, Russian Empire
- Died: 24 April 1795 (aged 65); Saint Petersburg, Russian Empire
- Resting place: Lazarevskoe Cemetery, St. Petersburg
- Known for: Singer
- Style: Baritone

Mark Fyodorovich Poltoratsky (Russian: Марк Фёдорович Полтора́цкий, Ukrainian: Марко Федорович Полторацький, Marko Fedorovych Poltoratskyi; 28 April 1729, Sosnitsa, Kiev Governorate – 24 April 1795, Saint Petersburg) was a Russian Imperial singer (baritone). He was of Ukrainian Cossack descent and an Active State Councillor of Russia. He is the founder of the Russian noble Poltoratsky family.

== Early life ==
His father was Fyodor Poltoratsky, who settled in the sotnia town of Sosnitsa of the Chernigov Regiment of the Hetman's Ukraine and accepted the priesthood. During the period of the hetmanship of Daniel Apostle, on 28 April 1729, Mark was born. The boy was clever, inquisitive, and his father sent him to the "Latin schools" of Chernigov, where he studied for four years.

His studies continued at Kiev-Mogila Academy. In childhood, Mark had a beautiful voice and, as a student, he sang in an academic choir.

In 1744 Mark's voice was heard by Count Alexei Razumovsky (a former chorister), who accompanied Empress Elizabeth Petrovna on her trip to Ukraine. A year later, the young man left his Kiev classmates and traveled to St. Petersburg to sing in the choir at the imperial court. Mark's career was soon appointed "installer" of the court choir.

In 1750 he was the first Slav to be enlisted in the Italian opera troupe, acting under the name "Marko Porturatsky". Three years later he was appointed regent of the Court Singing Chapel. With nominal decrees of the Empress, he repeatedly traveled to select the best voices in Ukraine. In 1754 he was promoted to colonel.

Mark Poltoratsky selected the "small singers", listening to church, monastic, school and other choirs in the hetman's regiments. Dmitry Bortniansky, 9 years old, the son of a Cossack of the Glukhovsky Hundreds of the Nezhinsky Regiment, got into the register of "small singers" of 30 October 1760.

In 1763 Poltoratsky headed the Court Singing Chapel and received hereditary nobility. He died in St. Petersburg and was buried at the Lazarevskoe Cemetery of the Alexander Nevsky Lavra.

== Manors ==
In the 1740s Poltoratsky acquired the village of Gruziny in the Novotorzhsky Uyezd of the Tver Province. The main house with outbuildings, a service building, a forge, a cellar, a boulder bridge, a landscape park, and stone residential peasant houses (21 houses) are preserved.

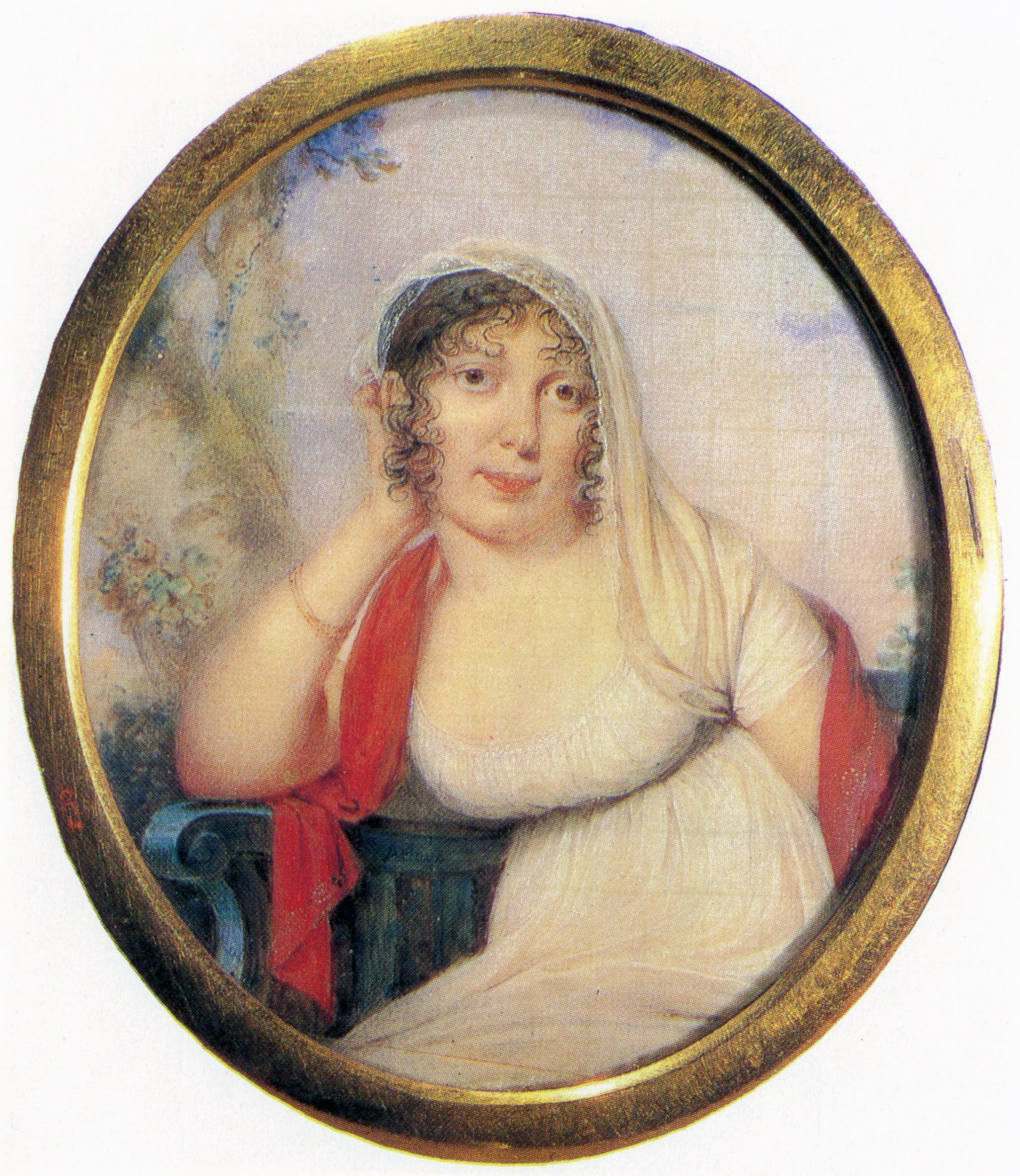
Agafokleya Poltoratskaya, Mark Poltoratsky's wife

In 1790 the Transfiguration Church, a replica of the Chesme Church in the capital, was founded by state councilor Mark Fedorovich Poltoratsky in the village of Krasnoye, Staritsky Uyezd, Tver Province.

== Family ==
Poltoratsky married the daughter of merchant Shemyakin. Widowed, he married the daughter of poor nobles of the Tver Province, Agafokleya Shishkova (29 June 1737 – 12 October 1822), who was not yet 15 years old. She "skillfully disposed of enormous wealth and large economy, holding her servants, kin and a bunch of already married children in her fists". Anna Kern remembered that her grandmother did not know how to read or write, but was "intelligent and responsive". The family had 22 children who formed the Poltoratsky family.
