= Agafokleya Poltoratskaya =

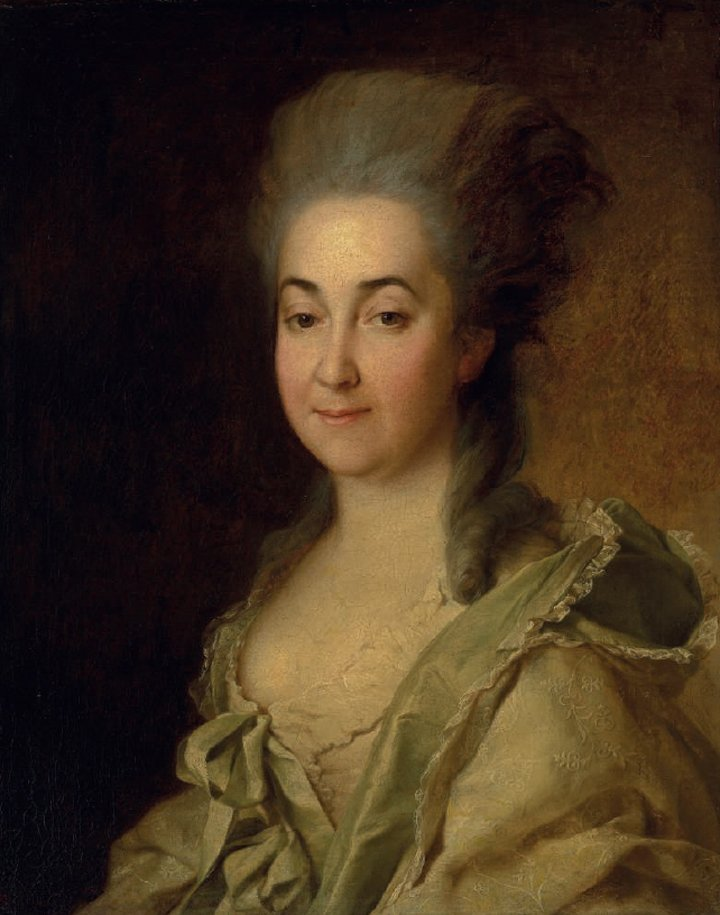
Dmitry Levitsky, Agafokleya Poltoratskaya, 1781, oils

Agafokleya Aleksandrovna Poltoratskaya (née Shishkova; 1737-1822), was a Russian entrepreneur and major landowner. She and her spouse Mark Poltoratsky were the founders of the noble family of Poltoratsky. She was a major business person and landowner of her time, and created a substantial fortune which helped her spouse attain nobility. She was a great contributor to the church, and also infamous because of her alleged great mistreatment of her serfs, which reportedly led Emperor Alexander of Russia to have her prosecuted.
