= Anna Kern =

Russian socialite and memoirist (1800–1879)

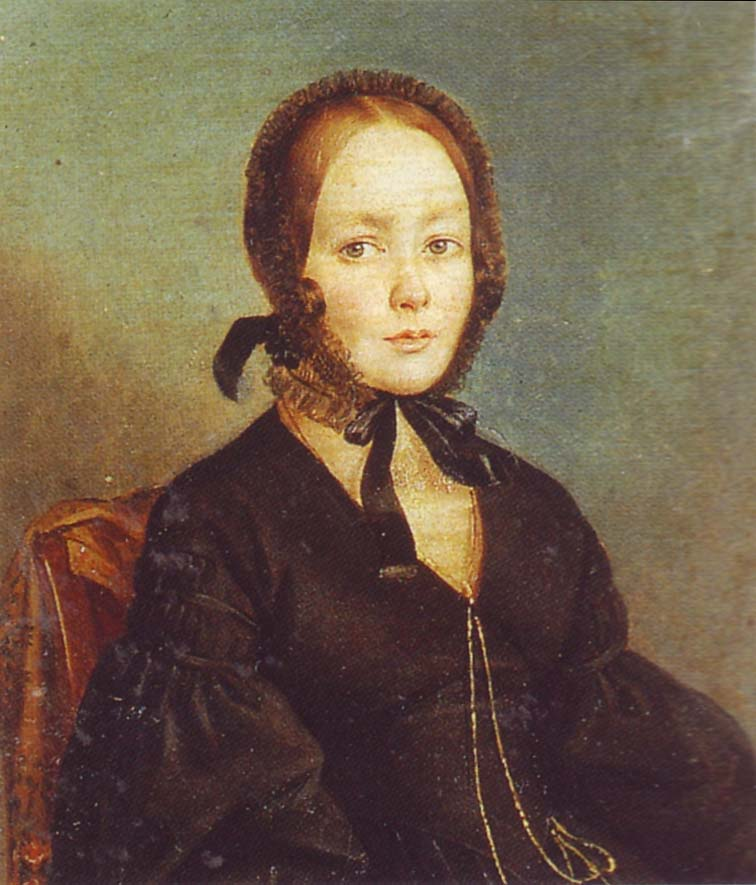
Anna Petrovna Kern Markova-Vinogradskaya (née Poltoratskaya), 1840.

Anna Petrovna Kern (Russian: Анна Петровна Керн, née Poltoratskaya (Полторацкая), name after second marriage: Markova-Vinogradskaya (Маркова-Виноградская); 22 February [O.S. 11 February] 1800 – 8 June [O.S. 27 May] 1879) was a Russian socialite and memoirist, notable as the addressee of a noted love poem written by Aleksandr Pushkin in 1825.

== Biography ==
Anna was born in Oryol at the mansion of her grandfather, the local governor. She was brought up in Lubny in the Poltava Governorate (present-day Ukraine). On 8 January 1817 she was married by her parents to the 52-year-old General Ermolai Fedorovich Kern (1765–1841), whom she professed to detest thoroughly.

After they settled in Saint Petersburg, Anna flirted with a number of Romantic poets, but her chief claim to fame was a love affair with Pushkin in the summer of 1825, during her stay with relatives in Trigorskoe, a manor adjacent to Mikhailovskoye, where the great poet was living in exile.

"Lately, our land has been visited by a beauty, who sings the Venetian Night in a heavenly way, in the manner of the gondolier's cantillation", Pushkin wrote to his friend Pyotr Pletnyov. Kern was one of many liaisons in Pushkin's life and she would not have become the most famous of his mistresses were it not for the poem that Pushkin put between the pages of the second canto of Eugene Onegin which he presented to her on the day of their parting.

The poem starts with the lines Ya pomnyu chudnoe mgnovenie, and Nabokov famously ridiculed attempts to translate these magic lines into English. Aleksandr Blok metamorphosed Pushkin's poem into his own "O podvigakh, o doblestyakh, o slave...", while Mikhail Glinka set the poem to music and dedicated the result to Kern's daughter Catherine.

"Every night I stroll through a garden and repeat in my mind: she was there - a boulder she stumbled upon rests on my desk, beside a withered branch of heliotrope; I write a lot of poems - and this, you may be sure, has all the symptoms of love..." Pushkin wrote to Kern's sister several days after her departure. He kept up a correspondence with Kern for a year and a half, but this was largely facetious. Although Pushkin's biographers tend to idealise their relationship, it is known that he referred to her later as the "whore of Babylon" and wrote to one of his friends that "with God's help I screwed her the other day".

In 1826, Kern divorced her aged husband. Ten years later, she married her 16-year-old cousin, Aleksandr Markov-Vinogradsky. The result of the rapture was the birth of a son, Alexander. Her last years were spent in such abject penury that she was constrained to sell off Pushkin's letters to her. She died alone on 27 May 1879 in Moscow (where her son moved her) in a furnished apartment at the corner of Gruzinskaya (Georgia) and Tverskaya streets. Anna Petrovna was buried in the churchyard near the old stone church in the village Prutnya (Russian: д. Прутня), which is 6 kilometers from Torzhok, near Tver. The rain washed away the road, preventing her coffin from being moved to the cemetery and "to her husband". The exact place of her burial in the cemetery of Prutnya cannot be determined today, but the cemetery has a symbolic tombstone. According to an urban legend, her funeral procession passed Pushkin Square just as the famous statue of the poet was being erected there. This was their last meeting, so to speak.

== Sources ==
- "Керн, Анна Петровна" . Brockhaus and Efron Encyclopedic Dictionary (in Russian). 1906.
