= Tobolsk Viceroyalty =

1782–1796 unit of Russia

Tobolsk Viceroyalty Тобольское наме́стничество (Russian)
- Viceroyalty of Russian Empire
- 1782–1796
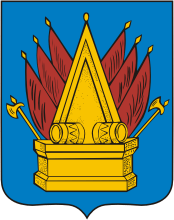
- Coat of arms

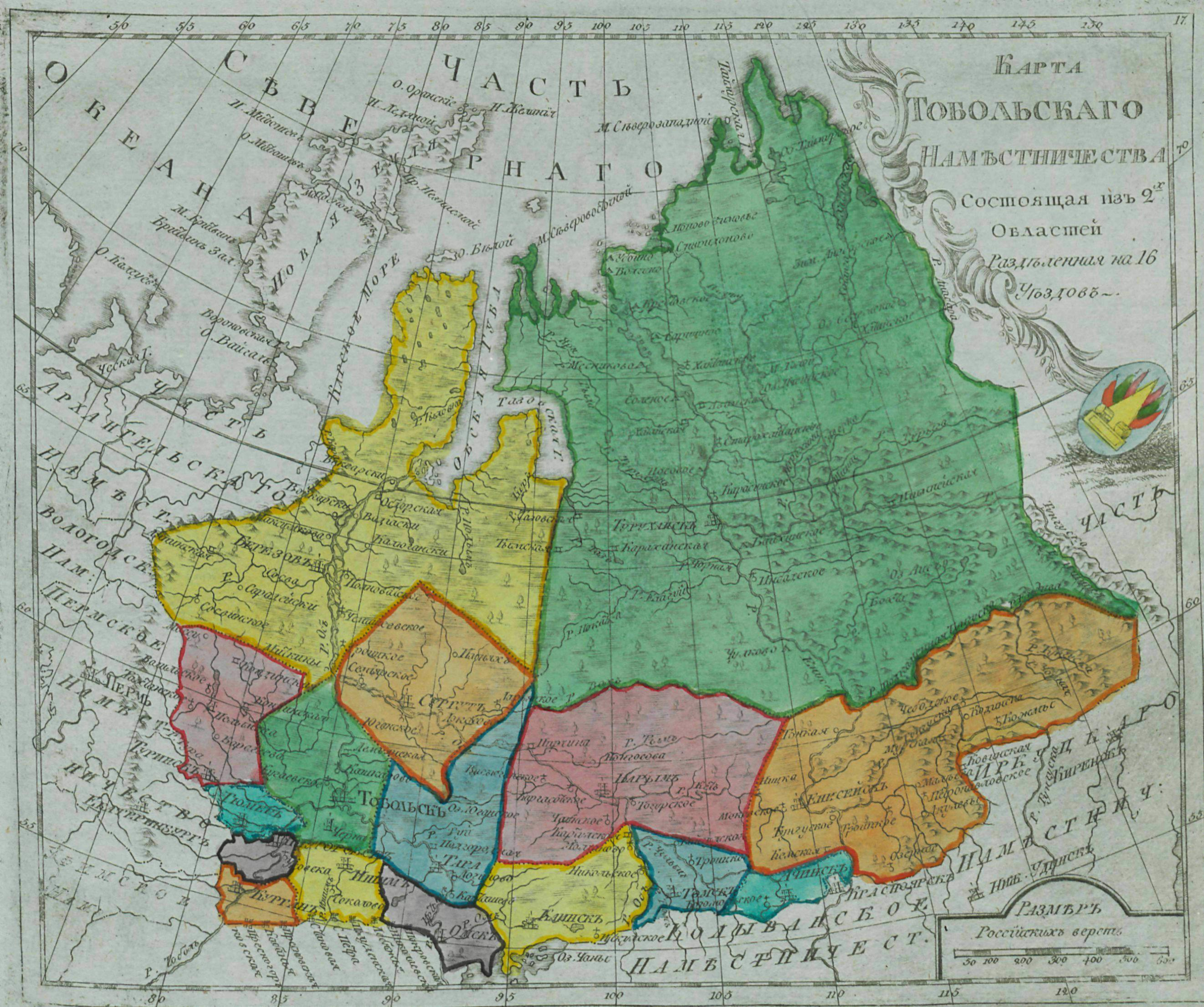
- Map of the Tobolsk Viceroyalty, consisting of 2 oblasts divided into 16 uezds (1792)

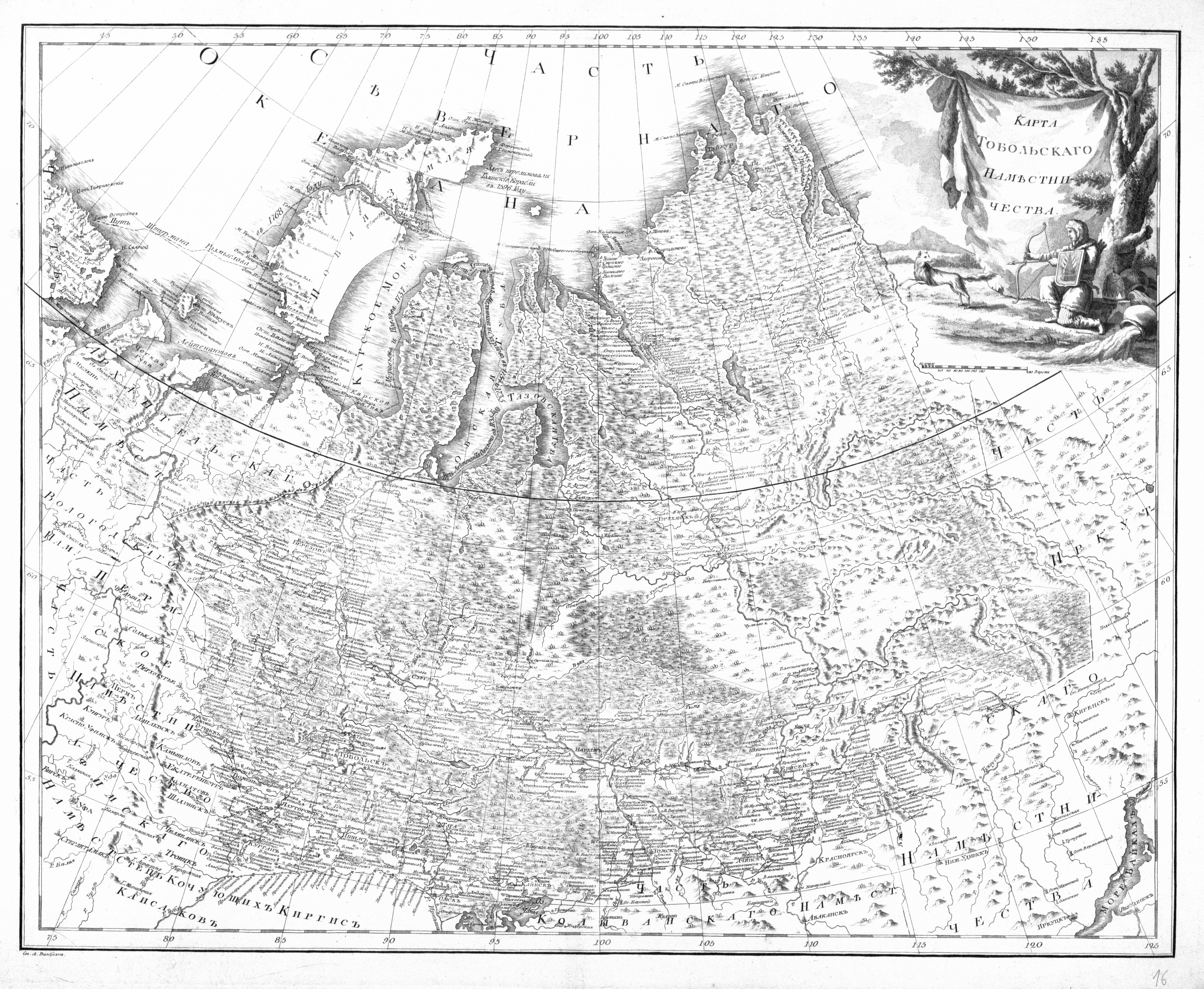
- Map of the Tobolsk governorship from "Russian atlas of forty-four maps consisting of forty-two governorships dividing the Empire" (1792).
- Capital: Tobolsk
- Population
  - 1785: 514,700
- History
  - Established: January 30 [O.S. January 19 ] 1782
  - Disestablished: December 23 [O.S. December 12] 1796
Preceded by	Succeeded by
Tobolsk (Russian Empire)	Tobolsk Governorate

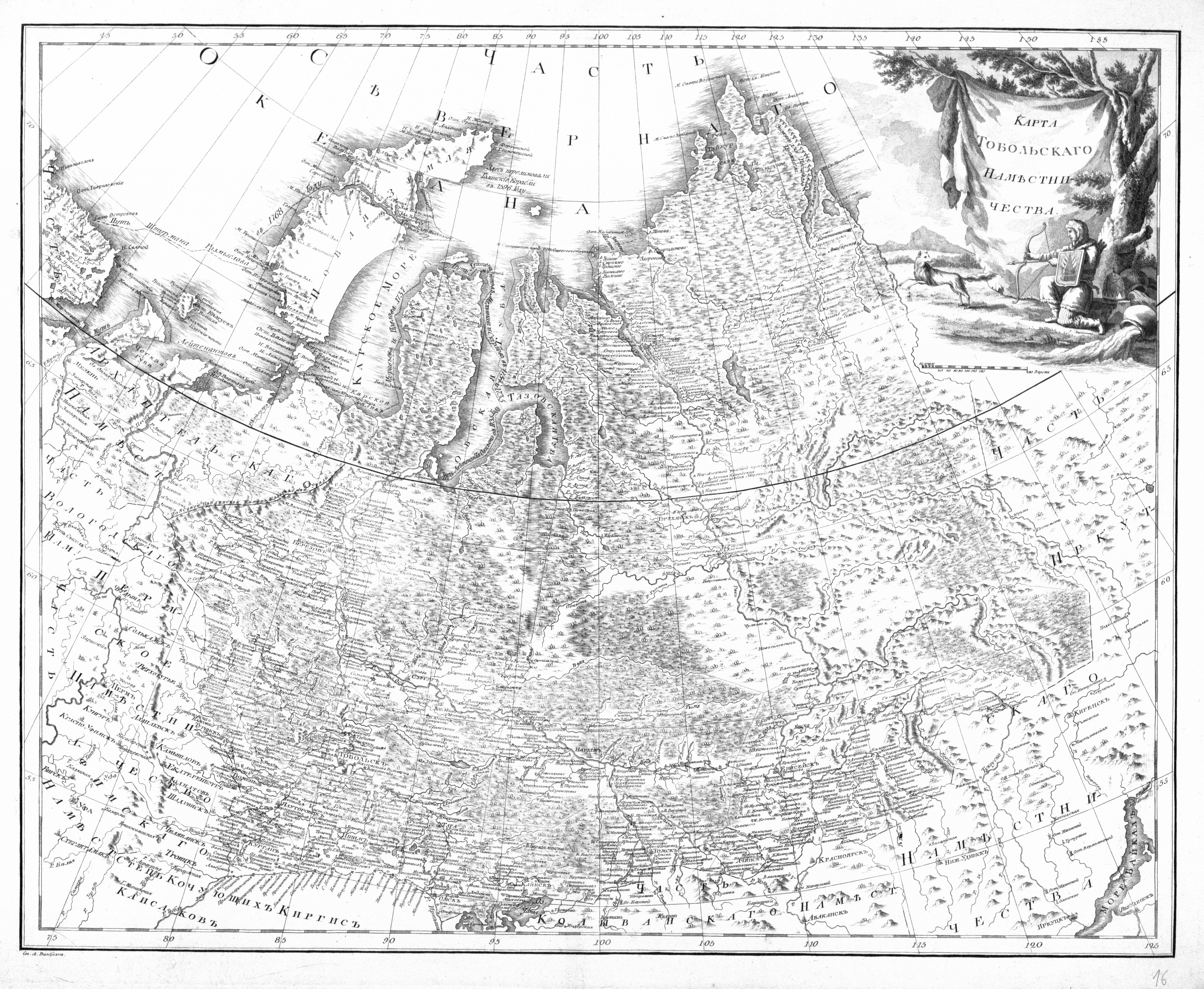
Map of Tobolsk Viceroyalty from the official Atlas of the Russian Empire (1792)

Tobolsk Viceroyalty (Russian: Тобольское наместничество, romanized: Tobol'skoye namestnichestvo) was an administrative-territorial unit (namestnichestvo) of the Russian Empire, which existed in 1782–1796. It was located in Siberia with its capital in Tobolsk.

== History ==
=== Establishment ===
The Tobolsk Viceroyalty was established by the personal decree of Catherine II from the territory of the dissolved Tobolsk province.

In 1780–1782, the three-story stone Palace of the Tobolsk Viceroys was rebuilt in Tobolsk. The palace was located on the site of the old clerk's chamber, built by Semyon Ulyanovich Remezov, on a high ravine between the Pryamskoy Vzvoz (gatehouse of the Tobolsk Kremlin) and the banks of the Irtysh river. In its spacious throne room, furnished with expensive carpets, was the gold-decorated imperial throne, from the steps of which the Tobolsk Viceroys received officials and foreign ambassadors.

To commemorate the opening of the Tobolsk Viceroyalty, ceremonial events were held in August 1782. In attendance were the Khan of the middle Kirghiz horde with the sultans, the Vogul ancestors, Prince Taishin of the Principality of Obdorsk, and other Ostyak princes.

Celebrations in Tobolsk began on August 21, 1782. In the evening, Major Yakov Meibom, who was appointed mayor, second-major, and collegiate secretary Matvey Yurlov, 6 horse trumpeters and 12 hussars, informed Tobolyakov and guests of the city about the upcoming festivities. At 4:00 a.m., after a cannon shot, a military team of 1,000 people arrived at the Tobolsk Kremlin. At 7:00 a.m. following another cannon shot, commanding officials began to arrive at the Viceroy’s Palace, to be met by Governor General, Lieutenant General of the Life Guards, and Prime Major Yevgeny Petrovich Kashkin. Another cannon shot at 8:00 a.m. signalled the beginning of a church service led by Archbishop of Tobolsk and Siberia, which was attended by all officials. They arrived at the Cathedral from the Viceroy's Palace in a special procession, proceeding along a special platform upholstered in scarlet cloth. During the prayer service, two rapid canon salutes were performed using 101 cannons. The prayer service was followed in turn by a celebratory dinner, an evening ball, and a supper after midnight.

On August 23, 1782, a dinner was given in the throne room of the Tobolsk Viceroy's Palace.

On August 30, 1782, the formal opening ceremony of the Tobolsk Viceroyalty took place. According to the description of Abramov N.A., from the words of a participant in these celebrations:

At the end of the Divine Liturgy and a prayer service, a procession with holy icons was made from the cathedral to the Tobolsk Viceroy's palace. Upon arrival at the palace, a prayer service was served on the occasion of the opening of the Offices. And after pronouncing many years to the Empress and the entire August House, cannons were fired. The food for the people was plentiful. There were whole roasted bulls with gilded horns, and various edible preparations were put inside the bulls. Barrels of plain wine and beer were installed. Fountains were arranged, from which grape wine was poured into the framed barrels. Everywhere there was expanse and fun. At night, the city was gracefully lit. A magnificent illumination was arranged, shining with different colors of lights, at the Tobolsk Viceroy's palace, where a majestic picture depicting Empress Catherine II was installed.

This description of the celebrations possibly belongs to Pyotr Slovtsov, a 15-year-old student of the Tobolsk Theological Seminary who read the ode "To Siberia" of his own composition at the celebrations from the seminary.

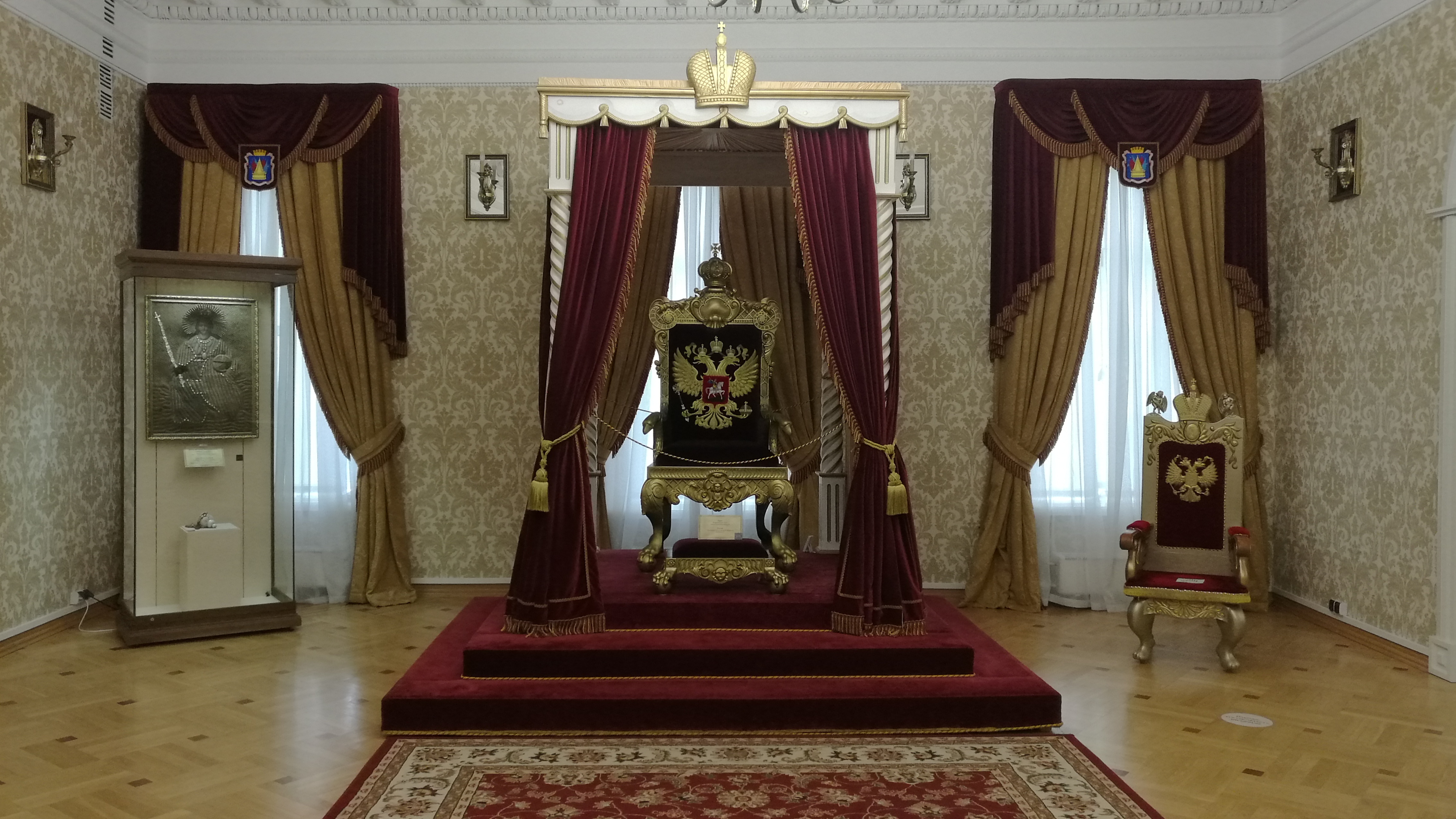
Tsar's throne in the throne room of the Tobolsk Viceroy's Palace (reconstruction)
Tobolsk State Historical Architectural Museum Reserve
The Viceroy's House (Tobolsk)

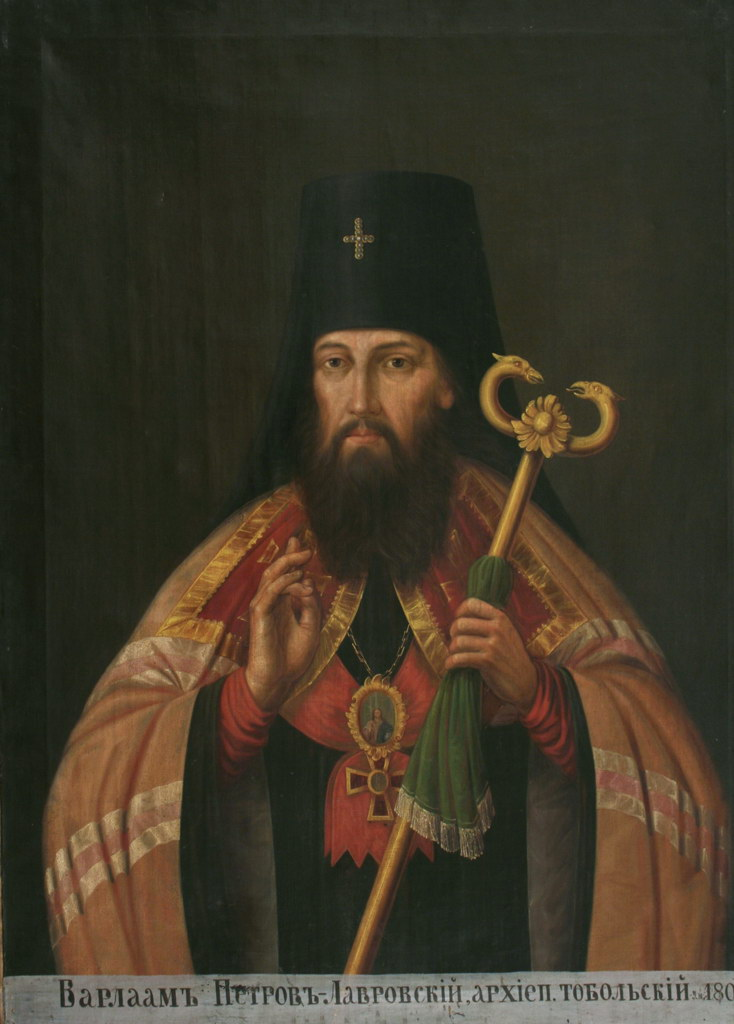
Varlaam Archbishop of Tobolsk and Siberia
Varlaam

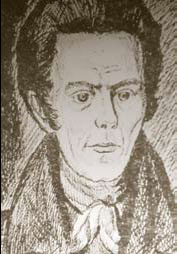
Pyotr Slovtsov, Siberian historian and poet

=== Structure ===
In 1785, the Tobolsk Viceroyalty consisted of two regions: Tobolsk Oblast and Tomsk Oblast.

The oblast (region) is an intermediate link in territorial administration between the namestnichestvo (vicegerency) and the uezd (county). By that, the administration of Empress Catherine II adapted the governing system to the vast Siberian territories.

Tobolsk Oblast includes 10 uezds: Beryozovsky Uezd, Ishimsky Uezd, Kurgansky Uezd, Omsky Uezd, Surgutsky Uezd, Tarsky Uezd, Tobolsky Uezd, Turinsky Uezd, Tyumensky Uezd, and Yalturovsky Uezd—the uezd-less town of Pelym (located within Turinsky Uezd), and 11 fortresses that made up the Ishim line (the southern border of Kurgansky Uezd, Ishimsky Uezd, and Omsky Uezd).

Tomsk Oblast includes 6 uezds: Achinsky Uezd, Yeniseisk Uezd, Kainsky Uezd, Narymsky Uezd, Tomsk Uezd, and Turukhansky Uezd.

Oblasts and Uezds of Tobolsk Viceroyalty
Oblast	Uezd	Coat of arms (1785)	City	Modern entity	Notes
Tobolsk Oblast	Beryozovsky Uezd		Beryozovo	Now Berezovo, urban-type settlement in Khanty-Mansi Autonomous Okrug	Has now lost city status.
Tobolsk Oblast	Ishimsky Uezd		Ishim	Town in Tyumen Oblast	
Tobolsk Oblast	Kurgansky Uezd		Kurgan	City in Kurgan Oblast	Received city status during the reform of Catherine II
Tobolsk Oblast	Omsky Uezd		Omsk	City in Omsk Oblast	Received city status during the reform of Catherine II
Tobolsk Oblast	Surgutsky Uezd		Surgut	City in Khanty-Mansi Autonomous Okrug	
Tobolsk Oblast	Tarsky Uezd		Tara	Town in Omsk Oblast	
Tobolsk Oblast	Tobolsky Uezd		Tobolsk	Town in Tyumen Oblast	
Tobolsk Oblast	Turinsky Uezd		Turinsk	Town in Sverdlovsk Oblast	
Tobolsk Oblast	Tyumensky Uezd		Tyumen	City in Tyumen Oblast	
Tobolsk Oblast	Yalturovsky Uezd		Yalutorovsk	Town in Tyumen Oblast	Received city status during the reform of Catherine II
Tomsk Oblast	Achinsky Uezd		Achinsk	City in Krasnoyarsk Krai	Received city status during the reform of Catherine II
Tomsk Oblast	Yeniseisk Uezd		Yeniseysk	Town in Krasnoyarsk Krai	
Tomsk Oblast	Kainsky Uezd		Kuybyshev	Now Kuybyshev, town in Novosibirsk Oblast	Received city status during the reform of Catherine II
Tomsk Oblast	Narymsky Uezd		Narym	Village (selo) in Parabelsky District of Tomsk Oblast, Russia	Has now lost city status
Tomsk Oblast	Tomsk Uezd		Tomsk	City in Tomsk Oblast	
Tomsk Oblast	Turukhansky Uezd		Turukhansk	Now Staroturukhansk, village in Turukhansky District, Krasnoyarsk Krai	Has now lost city status

=== Settlements ===
According to Catherine II's regional reform of 1785, which transformed provincial governments into viceroyalties, for a population to be considered a city, it required a special letter from Catherine II— creating a self-governing city society with rights as a legal entity—as well as the highest approved coat of arms and city plan. From 1788 until the early 1790s, general city dumas were organized in eight cities of the Tobolsk Viceroyalty: Tobolsk, Tomsk, Tyumen, Tara, Turukhansk, Yeniseisk, Narym, and Omsk.

The following cities were re-established in the Tobolsk Oblast: Omsk, from the Omsk fortress; Ishim, from the Korkina settlement; Kurgan, from the Kurgan settlement (Tsarevo Gorodishe settlement); and Yalutorovsk, from the Yalutorovsky ostrog.

The Tobolsk Viceroyalty had an area of 5 million square verst. It contained 16 cities, 16 ostrogs and suburbs, 42 pogosts, 43 slobodas, 124 villages; 10 fortresses; 5 monasteries; 18 outposts, camps, and redoubts; 2,994 villages and winter quarters; 1,232 auls and yurts of non-Christians; 72 landowners' lodges; and 6 state-owned and 14 private manufacturing establishments. In the vicegerency, 224 volosts of Russian settlers and 156 volosts of other faiths were organized.

=== Government ===
The management of the Tobolsk Viceroyalty was united with that of the Perm Viceroyalty under the authority of the governor-general, in whose hands all the threads of economic, police, and judicial administration were concentrated. He had full administrative and military power in the territory. E. P. Kashkin was appointed the first governor-general of the Tobolsk Viceroyalty and Perm Viceroyalty.

The Tobolsk Viceroyalty belongs to the I category (status, depending on which monetary payments were assigned to officials who served in them), uniting territories that had a more standardized administration.

=== Disestablishment ===
In 1796, the Tobolsk Viceroyalty was abolished by Paul I, and its territory was transferred to the newly formed Tobolsk Governorate.

== Population ==
The population of the Tobolsk Viceroyalty was represented by the following national and ethnic groups: Russians, Tatars, Сhuvalshchiki quitrents (Muslim settlers from other provinces, recorded as settled foreigners and endowed with 15 dessiatins of land), Bukharians, Ostyaks, Voguls, Samoyeds, Tungus, Chapogirs (one of the Yenisei clans of Tungus), and Yakuts.

== Economy ==
In 1783, there was a crop failure in the Tobolsk Viceroyalty.

== See also ==
- List of viceroyalties of the Russian Empire
- Viceroy of Russian Empire
