= Tyumen Governorate =

Administrative-territorial unit of the RSFSR

Tyumen Governorate (Russian: Тюменская губерния) is an administrative-territorial unit of the RSFSR, which existed in 1918 and 1920–1923. The provincial center is the city of Tyumen.

== History ==
=== 1918 ===
The provincial conference of Soviets held in Tyumen on April 3–5, 1918, decided to rename the Tobolsk Governorate to Tyumen and move the provincial center to Tyumen. A report on this was published in the Izvestia of the All-Russian Central Executive Committee on April 3. The Tobolsk Soviet opposed the decision of the conference and on May 3 declared itself the provincial.

Initially, the following counties were included in the province: Beryozovsky, Ishimsky, Kurgansky, Surgutsky, Tarsky, Tobolsky, Tyukalinsky, Tyumensky and Yalutorovsky.

After the capture of Tyumen by the White Czechs in the summer of the same year, the province again became Tobolsk.

=== 1920-1923 ===
After the capture of Western Siberia by the Reds and the retreat of the Kolchakites, provincial institutions were established in Tyumen, but the province continued to be alternately called Tobolsk and Tyumen. Thus, in the resolution of the VTsIK of August 27, 1919, it was called Tobolsk, and in the resolution of the SNK RSFSR of March 2, 1920, it was called Tyumen. The final renaming of the province to Tyumen was confirmed by the decree of the VTsIK "On the transfer of the Chelyabinsk and Tyumen provinces with the Ishim district to the jurisdiction of the Revolutionary Council of the 1st Labor Army..." dated April 21, 1920. The province included the Berezovsky, Ishimsky, Surgutsky, Tobolsky, Turinsky, Tyumensky and Yalutorovsky districts.

The process of transferring powers from the military revolutionary committees to the Soviets was completed in 1921.

In the early 1920s, the Reds suppressed the West Siberian Uprising — the largest anti-Bolshevik armed uprising of peasants, Cossacks, some workers and urban intelligentsia in the RSFSR. During February–May 1921, the rebels controlled a number of district centers (Berezovsky, Surgut, Tobolsk).

Abolished by the decree of the All-Russian Central Executive Committee of November 3, 1923. The territory became part of the newly formed Irbit, Ishim, Tobolsk and Tyumen districts of the Ural Region.

== Literature ==
- V. P. Petrova, ed. (2003). Administrative-territorial division of the Tyumen region (XVII-XX centuries) (PDF). Tyumen: OOO TNC "TyumenNIIGiprogaz", FGU IPP "Tyumen". p. 304. ISBN 5-87591-025-9.
- Administrative and political structure of the USSR: (materials on territorial transformations from 1917 to July 1, 1925) / S. I. Sulkevich, consultant of the Adm. Comm. All-Russian Central Executive Committee. - Leningrad: State Publishing House, 1926. 300 p.: tables - List of republics, regions and provinces with data on areas and population according to the calculation of the Central Statistical Office as of January 1, 1925.
- Administrative-territorial division of Siberia (August 1920 – July 1930), Western Siberia (July 1930 – September 1937), Novosibirsk Region (since September 1937); Handbook; West Siberian Book Publishing House; City of Novosibirsk; 1966; Art. 220.
- Preliminary results of the 1920 population census in Tyumen Province. Publication of the Tyumen Provincial Statistical Bureau. Printing House of the Council of the National Economy. Tobolsk. 1920.
- List of provinces, districts and volosts of Siberia as of March 1, 1921; Information and Instructor Political Department of the Management Department of the Siberian Revolutionary Committee; State Publishing House Siberian Regional Branch; City of Omsk; Art. 20.
- Kononenko, A. A. "Tyumen province". Archived from the original on 2022-10-21.
