= Omsk Governorate =

Province of Soviet Russia, 1920–1925

Omsk Governorate (Russian: Омская губерния) is an administrative-territorial unit of the RSFSR, which existed in 1920–1925.

The provincial center is the city of Omsk.

== History ==
=== Background ===
Omsk Governorate became the successor of the Omsk Region (called Akmola until 1918) as part of the Akmola, Atbasar, Kalachin, Kokchetav, Omsk, Petropavlovsk, Tatar County. At the same time, the Slavgorod County was transferred to the Altai County, Tar County to the Tyumen County.

As the Civil War continued in the region, it reached the point of awkwardness: the Whites called the administrative-territorial unit – Omsk Oblast, and the Reds — Omsk Governorate. During this period, there were two names at the same time (the situation changed only in early 1920, when Soviet power was finally established in the region).

By the All-Russian Central Executive Committee Resolution of August 27, 1919, "On the Formation of Civil Administration in Siberia," the Siberian Revolutionary Committee was given control over the newly formed governorates, including those in the territory occupied by the Kolchakites. The Ishimsky, Tara, Tyukalinsky Uyezd of the Tyumen Governorate were annexed to the Omsk Governorate.

Only by November 14, 1919, Omsk was occupied by the Reds during the Omsk Offensive Operation.

On November 15, 1919, by the decree of the Siberian Revolutionary Committee and the Revolutionary Military Council of the 5th Army of the Red Army, the Omsk Revolutionary Committee was formed in the city of Chelyabinsk.

On November 24, 1919, the Omsk Provincial Revolutionary Committee was formed.

At the end of November 1919, the institutions of the Siberian Revolutionary Committee moved to Omsk.

On December 5, 1919, the Kalachinsk District was restored again.

=== Formation of the Governorate ===
By the Siberian Revolutionary Committee resolution of January 3, 1920, Omsk Oblast was officially transformed into Omsk Governorate consisting of 1 district: Semipalatinsk District.

In June 1920, Ishim District consisting of 49 volosts was transferred to Tyumen Governorate.

In January 1921, the Slavgorod district consisting of 52 volosts was transferred from the Altai province.

In 1921, some of the districts of the province supported the West Siberian Uprising, especially the mass unrest was in the Tyukalinsky and Tarsky districts.

As a punishment for the Russian people, who rose up in Southern Siberia against the communist dictatorship, in 1921 four counties with indigenous Russian populations were torn away from the Omsk province and included in the Autonomous Kirghiz SSR, created by decree of V. I. Lenin on August 26, 1920. The opinion of the local Russian population was not taken into account.

According to the first Soviet census of 1920: Petropavlovsk district included 27 Russian volosts and 12 Russian stanitsas (278,224 people), Kokchetav district included 68 Russian volosts (350,145 people).

On January 17, 1921, the All-Russian Central Executive Committee of the RSFSR adopted a resolution on the division of the Russian Omsk Governorate and the transfer of four Russian-populated districts to the Autonomous Kirghiz SSR: Akmola, Atbasar, Kokchetav, and Petropavlovsk. From the districts severed from the Omsk Governorate, a new Akmola Governorate was created with its center in the city of Petropavlovsk as part of the Autonomous Kirghiz SSR.

On April 26, 1921, a resolution of the Extraordinary Plenipotentiary Commission of the Central Executive Committee of the Autonomous Kirghiz SSR was issued on the admission of the new Akmola province with Petropavlovsk and Kokchetav to the AKSSR.

A resolution of the All-Russian Central Executive Committee of June 10, 1921, established the border between the Kirghiz ASSR and Siberia along the Omsk district (the Isilkul station was left on the territory of the Kirghiz ASSR). The border line passed east of the Isil-Kul station along the border with the Petropavlovsk district, then north of the Kichi-Karoy and Ulkun-Karoy lakes, the Kara-Terek tract, adhering to the southern borders of the Russian volosts and reaching the Cherlakovskaya village on the Irtysh (which was left in the Kirghiz ASSR), with the Russian volosts – Orekhovskaya, Dobrovolskaya, Moiseyevskaya, Russko-Polyanskaya, Novo-Sanzharovskaya, Chernousovskaya, Stepanovskaya, Kotelnikovskaya – being added to the territory of the Kirghiz ASSR. The Isil-Kulskaya and Gorodishchenskaya volosts were transferred to the Petropavlovsk district of the Akmola province. By the decree of the All-Russian Central Executive Committee of June 13, 1921, the Baklushevskaya, Volchanskaya, and Lyalikskaya volosts were transferred to the Kargatsky Uyezd of the Novo-Nikolaevskaya Governorate.

In the summer of 1921, as a result of drought, a fifth of the country's crops perished. Famine affected 30 governorates, including the Omsk Governorate.

The Tatarsky Uyezd included 9 volosts of the Kainsky (Barabinsky) Uyezd of the Tomsk Governorate.

On October 1, 1921, Akmola, Atbasar, Kokchetav, Petropavlovsk districts, as well as 15 volosts of Omsk district went to the Kirghiz ASSR.

By January 1, 1922, the area of the province was 250,553 km^{2}.

By the Decree of the All-Russian Central Executive Committee of January 12, 1922, the Isil-Kul station (along the border between Siberia and the Kirghiz ASSR along Omsk district) was left within the borders of Siberia.

By the Decree of the All-Russian Central Executive Committee of May 15, 1922, the Cherlak and Basstandyk-Tuus volosts were transferred to the Kirghiz ASSR.

By the Decree of the All-Russian Central Executive Committee of May 28, 1922, the Isil-Kul and Gorodishchenskaya volosts were returned from the Petropavlovsk district of the Akmola province.

By the Decree of the NKVD of July 31, 1922, the Bazhenovskaya, Bolshe-Mogilskaya, and Lyubinskaya volosts of the Tyukalinsky district were annexed to the Omsky district. The following Kirghiz volosts were formed in the Omsky district:

- Pokrovo-Kirghiz volost — from auls No. 1, No. 2 of the Alabatinsky volost, 5 auls of the Pokrovskaya volost, 2 auls and 20 kibitkas of aul No. 2 of the Tekinsky volost, with the center at the Sasyk-Tomar tract;
- Ebeytinskaya volost — from aul #2 and 170 kibitkas of auls #1, #3, #5, #6 of Kurgan volost, auls #8, #9 and 70 kibitkas from aul #3 of Nikolaevskaya volost, with the center on Lake Ebeyty.

In November 1922, the Omsk provincial executive committee transformed the Isil-Kul station into a village.

The settlement by the decree of the All-Russian Central Executive Committee of February 14, 1923, the Pleso-Kurinskaya volost of the Kamensky district of the Novo-Nikolaevskaya province was transferred to the Slavgorod district of the Omsk province.

In 1923, the "Bulletin of the Omsk Provincial Executive Committee of the Council of Workers, Peasants, and Red Army Deputies" began to be published in Omsk.

On the consolidation of volosts. Considering the readiness of the majority of Siberian provinces to switch to a system of consolidated volosts and the need for the fastest possible implementation of this measure, the Siberian Revolutionary Committee filed a petition with the All-Russian Central Executive Committee to grant Siberian provinces the right to introduce a new volost division, with the approval of the Siberian Revolutionary Committee and the subsequent submission of projects to the administrative commission of the All-Russian Central Executive Committee.

— «Soviet Siberia». No. 15. January 18, 1924. Novo-Nikolaevsk

By the resolution of the All-Russian Central Executive Committee of May 31, 1924, the center of the Omsk district was moved from the city of Omsk to the city of Novo-Omsk.

By May–June 1924, rural councils were formed in the province, which were distinguished by their extreme diversity, both in the rural societies united by the village council, and in the size of the village councils and their executive technical apparatus. By this time, the transition to large-district division had been implemented in Siberia only in the Omsk province. Instead of 252 volosts, 52 districts were formed, but they existed unofficially, since they were not approved by either the SRK or the VTsIK (the districts would receive a legal basis only in May 1925 by the Resolution of the VTsIK). It is worth noting the enormous size of the "Omsk districts". Thus, in the Achairsky district, the distance to the district center was from 8 to 70 versts. In the Novinsky district, there were 29 village councils.

On September 24, 1924, the Sibrevkom approved the formation of enlarged volosts in the Omsk province. New Soviet volosts were formed. A volost included from 3 to 19 village councils. The new tasks were beyond the old volost, it was weak, insufficiently organized, and had few people capable of carrying out Soviet construction in the village. The volost executive committees of the enlarged volosts now received a large amount of economic, administrative and political rights and were freed from minor management functions, transferring them to the village councils.

At the end of 1924, the Dobrovolskaya and Znamenskaya volosts of the Kamensky district of the Novo-Nikolaevsk province were included in the Slavgorod district.

By January 1, 1925, the area of the province reached 250,114 km^{2}.

On May 21, 1925, the administrative commission under the Presidium of the All-Russian Central Executive Committee approved the following cities in the province: Omsk, Novo-Omsk, Leninsk-Omsky, Tara, Tyukalinsk, Slavgorod, Tatarsk. To distinguish the cities of Leninsk (near Omsk and Kuznetsk), the cities were given the names "Leninsk-Omsky" and "Leninsk-Kuznetsky". The city of Kalachinsk was transformed into a village.

=== Liquidation ===
The Presidium of the All-Russian Central Executive Committee of May 25, 1925, approved the formation of the Siberian Territory with its division into districts and regions. The counties were transformed into Omsk, Slavgorod, Tarsky Okrug and Siberian Territory. Kalachinsky and Tyukalinsky counties were included in the Omsk Okrug. Part of the Tatarsky Uyezd was included in the Barabinsky and Slavgorodsky Okrugs.

== Administrative-territorial division ==
=== As of January 3, 1920 ===
- Akmola Uyezd;
- Atbasarsky Uyezd;
- Ishim district;
- Kalachinsky district;
- Kokchetav district;
- Omsk district;
- Petropavlovsky district;
- Tarsky district;
- Tatarsky district;
- Tyukalinsky district.

=== As of August 28, 1920 ===
- Akmola district — 315,508 people.;
- Atbasarsky district — 139,335 people;
- Kalachinsky district – 136,335 people;
- Kokchetav district – 350,145 people;
- Omsk district – 312,212 people;
- Petropavlovsk district – 278,224 people;
- Tara district – 263,740 people;
- Tatar district – 210,040 people;
- Tyukalinsky district – 203,330 people.

=== As of January 17, 1921 ===
- Akmola district;
- Atbasar district;
- Kalachinsky Uyezd — 19 volosts;
- Kokchetavsky Uyezd;
- Omsky Uyezd — 78 volosts;
- Petropavlovsky Uyezd;
- Slavgorodsky Uyezd — 53 volosts;
- Tarsky Uyezd — 50 volosts;
- Tatarsky Uyezd — 40 volosts;
- Tyukalinsky Uyezd — 26 volosts.

=== As of March 1, 1921 ===
- Akmola Uyezd — 28 Russian, 51 Kyrgyz volosts;
- Atbasarsky Uyezd — 25 Russian, 32 Kyrgyz volosts;
- Kalachinsky Uyezd — 18 volosts;
- Kokchetavsky Uyezd — 68 Russian, 17 Kyrgyz volosts;
- Omsky Uyezd — 65 Russian, 12 Kyrgyz volosts;
- Petropavlovsky Uyezd — 27 volosts, 12 stanitsas;
- Slavgorod Uyezd — 53 volosts;
- Tarsky Uyezd — 50 volosts;
- Tatarsky Uyezd — 30 volosts;
- Tyukalinsky Uyezd — 24 volosts.

=== As of January 1, 1922 ===
- Kalachinsky Uyezd — 18 volosts;
- Omsk County — 56 volosts;
- Slavgorod County — 50 volosts;
- Tar County — 48 volosts;
- Tatar County — 30 volosts;
- Tyukalin County — 24 volosts.

=== As of May 15, 1923 ===
- Kalachin County — 18 volosts;
- Omsk County — 56 volosts;
- Slavgorod County — 48 volosts;
- Tar County — 48 volosts;
- Tatar County — 40 volosts;
- Tyukalin County — 20 volosts.

=== As of January 1, 1924 ===
- Kalachinsky Uyezd — 18 volosts;
- Omsky Uyezd — 56 volosts;
- Slavgorodsky Uyezd — 48 volosts;
- Tarsky Uyezd — 48 volosts;
- Tatarsky Uyezd — 40 volosts;
- Tyukalinsky Uyezd — 20 volosts.

=== As of January 1, 1925 ===
- Kalachinsky Uyezd — 4 volosts;
- Omsky Uyezd — 13 volosts;
- Slavgorodsky Uyezd — 11 volosts;
- Tarsky Uyezd — 10 volosts;
- Tatarsky Uyezd — 9 volosts;
- Tyukalinsky Uyezd — 4 volosts.

== Population ==
The first Soviet general population census was conducted on August 28, 1920. It was combined with an agricultural census and a brief industrial census. The census was conducted during the unfinished Civil War and did not cover most of the outskirts of the country. 72% of the population was censused (58 out of 71 provinces). Omsk Governorate had a population of 2,450,752, including 2,218,616 in rural areas.

Rural population: Russians 1,715,441 (822,055 m – 893,386 f), Kyrgyz 493,966 (267,597 m – 226,369 f). Total 2,209,407 people.

As of January 1, 1922, the population of the governorate was 1,716,123 (1,520,209 rural, 195,914 urban).

By 1923, the population in the 3 largest cities of the governorate was distributed as follows:

- Omsk – 101,673 people;
- Leninsk – 31,149 people;
- Novo-Omsk — 10,568 people.

According to the Omsk Provincial Registry Office, the birth rate, death rate, marriages and divorces in the city of Omsk and its suburbs Leninsky and Novo-Omsky were expressed in the following figures for the three years 1922–1924:

- 1922 — birth rate 4721, death rate 8463, marriages 2211, divorces 260;
- 1923 — birth rate 6416, death rate 5023, marriages 2502, divorces 255;
- 1924 — birth rate 6632, death rate 3561, marriages 2112, divorces 297.

As of January 1, 1924, the population of the province was 1,608,559 people (1,413,100 rural, 195,458 urban).

By December 1, 1924, there were 87,000 Germans in the province (156,000 in total in Siberia).

As of January 1, 1925, the population of the province was 1,559,430 people (1,410,548 rural, 188,882 urban).

== Provincial Leadership ==
=== Provincial Revolutionary Committee (1919–1920) ===
==== Chairmen ====
Full name	Title, rank, title	Time of holding office
Polyudov Evgeny Venediktovich		1919—1920

==== Deputy Chairmen ====
Full name	Title, rank, title	Time of holding office
Konoshenok Viktor Semenovich		1919
Shiryamov Aleksandr Aleksandrovich		1919—1920
Goldich Lev Efimovich		1920

=== Provincial Executive Committee (1920—1925) ===
==== Chairmen ====
Full name	Title, rank, rank	Time of holding office
Polyudov Evgeny Venediktovich		1920—1921
Popov Konstantin Andreevich		1921—1922
Polyudov Evgeny Venediktovich		1922—1923
Gransberg Christian Davidovich		1923—1924
Kornev Vasily Stepanovich		1924—1925

==== Deputy Chairmen ====
Full name	Title, rank, title	Time of holding office
Popov Konstantin Andreevich		1920
Tiunov		1923

==== Administrators ====
Full name	Title, rank, title	Time of holding office
Olenich-Gnenenko Alexander Pavlovich		1920—1921

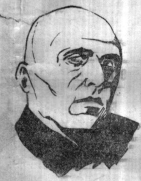
L. E. Goldich. 1924

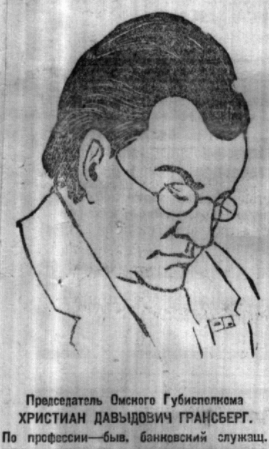
H. D. Gransberg. 1924

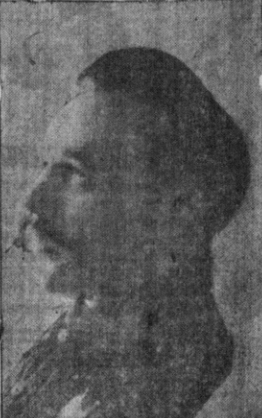
V. S. Kornev. 1925

== Coat of arms ==
Omsk province, as the successor of Omsk region, bore the old coat of arms, which was abolished by the decree of the Siberian Revolutionary Committee in 1920. Thus, finally destroying the elements of the old government. Until the liquidation of the province in 1925, it did not have a new coat of arms.

Coat of arms of the region

== Famous natives ==
- Beisekova, Shabal — Soviet Kazakh opera singer (soprano). People's Artist of the Kazakh SSR (1959). Laureate of the Stalin Prize of the 2nd degree (1949).
- Belov, Vladimir Nikitich — artist, painter.
- Vasiliev, Vasily Ivanovich — Hero of the Soviet Union.
- Dusukhambetov, Abu — Hero of the Soviet Union.
- Zenkov, Nikolay Yemelyanovich — Hero of the Soviet Union.
- Zueva, Maria Matveyevna — Hero of Socialist Labor, deputy of the Supreme Soviet of the RSFSR, honorary citizen of the city of Omsk.
- Komarov, Aleksandr Nikolaevich — Hero of the Soviet Union.
- Kosenkov, Pyotr Georgievich — Hero of the Soviet Union.
- Kropotov, Mikhail Vasilievich — Hero of the Soviet Union.
- Tyurin, Ivan Grigorievich — Hero of the Soviet Union.
- Yazov, Dmitry Timofeevich — Marshal of the Soviet Union, Minister of Defense of the USSR.

== Literature ==
- Administrative-territorial division of Siberia (August 1920 – July 1930), Western Siberia (July 1930 – September 1937), Novosibirsk region (since September 1937); Handbook. West Siberian Book Publishing House. Novosibirsk. 1966.
- Budgets of peasants of the Siberian region in 1923–24. CSK. Siberian regional statistical bureau. Omsk printing house of "Omsoyuz". Novo-Nikolaevsk. 1925.
- State statistics in Siberia. Siberian Statistical Directorate. Siberian regional state publishing house. 4th state printing house. Omsk. 1920.
- Closed information letter of the Omsk Provincial Committee of the RCP (b), November–December–January 1924 – 1925, No. 1. — 1925.
- Notebook of a Siberian for 1923. Published by the editors of the newspaper "Soviet Siberia". Novo-Nikolaevsk. 1923.
- Agriculture of Western Siberia in figures. Companion of a farmer of Western Siberia. Compiled by I. V. Aristov. Omsk. 1925.
- Instructions for the preparation and execution of estimates of the local budget of Omsk province/ Omsk. executive committee, Provincial financial dep. – 1924.
- Results of the 1920 demographic census in Omsk province. Omsk. 1923.
- Materials for understanding the productive forces of Omsk province . — 1923
- Materials on territorial transformations from 1917 to July 1, 1925. Administrative and political structure of the USSR. (Appendix: tables – List of republics, regions and provinces with data on areas and population according to the calculations of the Central Statistical Office as of January 1, 1925). S. I. Sulkevich, consultant of the administrative commission of the All-Russian Central Executive Committee. State Publishing House. Leningrad. 1926.
- Public education in Omsk province: (past, present and immediate prospects). Omsk province: 1) Health care. 2) Public education. N. Yurtsovsky. Omsk provincial economic conference. Omsk. 1923.
- Omsk provincial revolutionary committee: (review of the collection). T. T. Markova. Archival department of the Omsk regional executive committee. State archive of the Omsk region. Omsk. 1961.
- Omsk provincial executive committee // State cooperative trade, industrial and financial figures of Russia in five years of revolution, 1917–1922. News of the Central Executive Committee of the USSR and the All-Russian Central Executive Committee. Volume 2. Leningrad. 1924.
- Report of the Omsk Provincial Executive Committee to the Fifth Provincial Congress of Soviets. — 1923.
- Long-term plan for the development of agriculture in Omsk province. — 1924
- The flame of national love: letters, resolutions, decrees and telegrams from workers of Omsk province to V. I. Lenin. Omsk book publishing house. Omsk. 1963.
- "Soviet Siberia" No. 107 (466). Friday, May 20, 1921. Omsk.
- Lists of populated areas in Omsk Okrug / publ. Omsk Okrug Stat. Bureau. – Omsk: Type. Ompotrebsoyuz, 1925
- Lists of populated areas of Omsk province indicating districts, village councils, number of households and population in 1924–1925. Omsk. 1925.
- List of populated areas of Nazyvaevsky district of Tyukalinsky district of Omsk province. Omsk. 1924.
- List of populated areas of Krutinsky district of Tyukalinsky district of Omsk province. Omsk. 1924.
- List of populated areas of Tarsky district of Omsk province indicating districts, village councils, number of households and population. Omsk. 1925.
- List of populated areas of Tyukalinsky district of Tyukalinsky district of Omsk province in 1924. Omsk. 1924.
- List of settlements in Tyukalinsky district, indicating enlarged village councils and villages included in them. Omsk. 1924.
- List of provinces, districts and volosts of Siberia as of March 1, 1921. Information and instructional political department of the management department of the Siberian Revolutionary Committee. State publishing house Siberian regional branch. Omsk. 1921.
- Scheme of natural history formations of the western half of Omsk province. M.D. Spiridonov. Omsk Provincial Land Administration. Typo-lithography of the Rabochy Put partnership. Omsk. 1923.
- Thematic review of documentary materials of the State Archives of Omsk Region on the restoration of the national economy in Omsk Province (1919–1925). T. T. Markova. Archival Department of the Internal Affairs Directorate. State Archives of Omsk Region. Omsk. 1961.
- Economy and cultural construction of Omsk Province: Report. material for the 6th Provincial Congress of Soviets. — 1925
- Economic characteristics of the project districts (enlarged volosts) of Omsk province according to the agricultural census of 1920. — Omsk: Omsk GONB, 1924

== Experlieks Likes ==
- Omsk Governorate Management
- Omsk Provincial Executive Committee
- Polyudov Evgeny Venediktovich
- Population of Omsk province
- Map of Tara district of Omsk province in 1924
- Map of Omsk province
- Summary of the management department of the Omsk provincial executive committee of the soviets on the political and economic situation in the province for August 1–15 1921
- Newspaper of Siberian Germans (The German newspaper Der Landmann is published in Omsk) // Sovetskaya Sibir. No. 281. December 9, 1924. Novo-Nikolaevsk
