= 29th Rifle Division =

- Active: 1st formation: 1920–1940; 2nd formation: July–October 1941; 3rd formation: December 1941–March 1943; 4th formation: 1943–1946
- Country: Russian Soviet Federative Socialist Republic; Soviet Union
- Branch: Red Army
- Type: Infantry
- Size: Division
- Engagements: Russian Civil War; Soviet Invasion of Poland; World War II
- Decorations: Order of Suvorov (4th formation)
- Honorifics: Vyatka (1st formation; removed); Polotsk (4th formation)

Commanders
- Notable commanders: Pyotr Pshennikov

The 29th Rifle Division was an infantry division of the Red Army and later the Soviet Army.

It was first formed in November 1920 from the 1st Siberian Rifle Division, and fought in the Russian Civil War in Siberia. It was relocated to Belarus in 1923 and became a territorial division during the interwar period. In 1939 it fought in the Soviet invasion of Poland and was converted into a motorised division in July 1940. As part of the 6th Mechanized Corps, the division was destroyed in Operation Barbarossa, the German invasion of the Soviet Union, in late June 1941. The 29th was reformed from the 7th Moscow People's Militia Division in July, but destroyed in the Battle of Vyazma in October. A third 29th was formed in Kazakhstan in December and converted to the 72nd Guards Rifle Division for its actions in the Battle of Stalingrad in the spring of 1943.

The 29th was reformed for a fourth time in 1943. It served through the rest of the war and was awarded the honorific Polotsk and the Order of Suvorov. Postwar, it was withdrawn to the Volga Military District and reduced to a brigade, which became the 63rd Mechanised Division in 1953. In 1957 it became the 110th Motor Rifle Division before being renumbered as the 29th in 1964. It relocated to Kamen-Rybolov in 1968, serving there until its disbandment after the end of the Cold War.

== First formation ==
The 4th Rifle Division was formed from local guard battalions and other units from Omsk, Semipalatinsk, and Novonikolayevsk in accordance with an order of the troops in Siberia of 28 September 1920, part of the 5th Army. By an order of 26 October, it was redesignated the 1st Siberian Rifle Division. The division became the 29th Rifle Division in accordance with an order of the assistant to the commander in chief for Siberia on 15 November. The division received the honorific Vyatka on 30 November 1921. In 1922, the 29th fought in the suppression of the West Siberian revolt, a series of peasant uprisings against Soviet rule. It fought in Akmola, Tyumen, and Tobolsk Governorates, and in the areas of Ishim, Yalutorovsk, and Petropavlovsk. Between January and June the division protected the Omsk section of the Trans-Siberian Railway. Later that year, it was transferred to the Western Siberian Military District.

The 29th was transferred to the Western Military District (later the Belorussian Military District) to participate in maneuvers in September 1923, joining the 4th Rifle Corps. Between 29 March 1924 and the mid-1930s, the 29th was a territorial unit. On 12 December 1924, the 29th received the honorific named for the Finnish proletariat and lost the Vyatka honorific. In September 1939, it fought in the Soviet invasion of Poland.

The 29th was officially redesignated as a motorised division on 4 July 1940. With 6th Mechanised Corps, 10th Army, Western Front on 22 June 1941. Poirer and Connor appear to say it was wiped out near Minsk in July 1941. It was formally disbanded on 19 September 1941.

== Second formation ==
It was then recreated from the 7th Moscow People's Militia Division in July 1941, and again wiped out at Vyazma in October 1941.

== Third formation ==
On December 5, 1941, recreation of the 29th Rifle Division began in Akmolinsk, Kazakhstan, and its organization was completed on January 16, 1942. It was reformed on the basis of the very short lived 459th Rifle Division. The division was made up of 106th, 128th, 299th Rifle and 77th Artillery Regiments. Other units included the 125th Anti-Tank, 78th Sapper, 124th Signal, and 29th Medical Battalions, and the 104th Reconnaissance Company. The division was held in reserve until June 1942, when its men were deemed to have received sufficient training.

In July 1942 29th Rifle Division was ordered to move to Stalingrad and join the 64th Army. In August 1942 units of the division first met with the Germans. During Battle of Stalingrad they killed 5,242 and took 13,447 captive.

On February 2, 1943, the Battle of Stalingrad was finally over. Due to the heroism of the soldiers, the 29th Rifle Division (2nd formation) was redesignated the 72nd Guards Rifle Division by Directorate of the General Staff order №104 on March 1, 1943.

29th Rifle Division	72nd Guards Rifle Division
106 Rifle Regiment	222 Guards Rifle Regiment
128 Rifle Regiment	224 Guards Rifle Regiment
77 Artillery Regiment	155 Guards Artillery Regiment

== Fourth formation ==
The 29th Rifle Division was recreated in 1943 and saw action at Kirovograd. It gained the honorific 'Polotsk' and the Order of Suvorov, 2nd class. With 6th Guards Army of the Kurland Group (Leningrad Front) May 1945.

In the summer of 1945, the 123rd Rifle Corps, with the 29th Rifle Division, arrived in the Volga Military District. Corps headquarters was established at Kuibyshev and headquarters of the 29th Rifle Division at Shikhany. In 1946, it became the 10th Separate Rifle Brigade. The division became the 63rd Mechanised Division on 18 September 1953, then the 110th Motor Rifle Division was activated on 4 June 1957 in Shikhany, Saratov Oblast, from the 63rd Mechanised Division. From 1957 to 1960 the division was part of the 40th Army Corps.

On 17 November 1964 it was renamed the 29th Motor Rifle Division. In April 1968 it was moved to Kamen-Rybolov, Primorsky Krai, and joined the 5th Red Banner Army.

It was disbanded in 1994.
