= Sergei Mrachkovsky =

Russian revolutionary

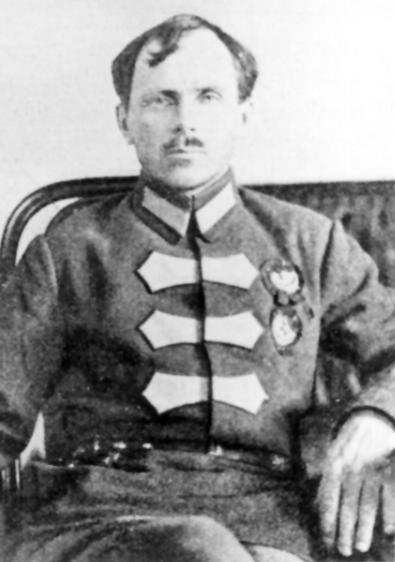
Sergei Mrachkovsky

Sergei Vitalevich Mrachkovsky (Russian: Серге́й Вита́льевич Мрачко́вский; 15 June 1888 – 24 August 1936) was a Russian revolutionary, Red Army commander, and supporter of Leon Trotsky, who was executed at the start of the Great Purge.

== Career ==
Mrachkovky was born in a family of Russian ethnicity in the Surgutsky Uyezd of Tobolsk Governorate, in Siberia, where his mother was a political exile. His grandfather was a founding member of one of Russia's first underground Marxist circles, the South Russian Workers' Union. His father, a locksmith, was also a revolutionary. After three years at a local school, Mrachkovsky was sent to a railway school in Chelyabinsk, then worked as a locksmith. Reportedly he was interested in anarchism and was in contact with criminals in his teens. He joined the Bolsheviks during the 1905 Revolution. Arrested in 1908, he was in prison until 1911, then returned to work as a locksmith.

After the February Revolution, Mrachkovsky was elected to the Yekaterinburg soviet (council) and the Ural Regional committee of the Bolshevik Party. In February 1918, at the start of the Russian Civil War, he was appointed a political commissar of the Red Army for the Yekaterinburg-Chelyabinsk front. In 1919, he led the Special Northern Expeditionary Detachment, which operated behind enemy lines, fighting against the White Army commanded by Admiral Kolchak. Their mission was to prevent the White army in Siberia from linking up with the British expeditionary force in the far north. He also commanded a division reputedly made up of army deserters and criminals released from prison by the revolution, who put down localised rebellions against Bolshevik rule with great severity. He was later political commissar of the 51st Rifle Division, commanded by Vasily Blyukher, and in 1920–22, was Red Army commander in West Siberia, where Ivan Smirnov was head of the regional communist party. In 1923–24, he was commander of the Volga Military District.

In 1923, Mrachkovsky supported Trotsky against the ruling triumvirate of Joseph Stalin, Grigory Zinoviev and Lev Kamenev in the power struggle that began while the Bolshevik leader, Vladimir Lenin was terminally ill. For this reason, he was prevented from continuing military service, and was appointed in charge of an industrial trust in Sverdlovsk. In 1926, when Zinoviev and Kamenev split with Stalin, Mrachkovsky warned against allying with either side. "We will not ally ourselves with anyone. Zinoviev would end by deserting us and Stalin would trick us." In September 1927, when the Politburo, which was controlled by Stalin, banned the publication of a political programme drawn up by the left opposition, Mrachkovsky arranged to have it printed illegally. The print shop was raided by the OGPU on 12 September, and Mrachkovsky was expelled from the Communist Party. In October, he was one of the first Trotskyists to be arrested and imprisoned. After three months in prison he was exiled to a village near Karaganda.

In 1929, Mrachkovsky submitted a statement to the Central Control Commission renouncing the opposition and in May 1930 he was readmitted to the Communist Party. In 1932, he was appointed head of construction for the Baikal–Amur Mainline. Unable to recruit a large workforce to complete the line, the Politburo decided to use convict labour, and put the OGPU in charge. Mrachkovsky remained head of construction, but with an OGPU officer, Nikolai Yeremin, as his deputy. In September 1933, he asked to be removed from this post, and was appointed to an economic post in Karaganda.

== Arrest and death ==
Mrachkovsky was arrested on 25 January 1935, in the wake of the assassination of Sergei Kirov. He was reported to have been interrogated for ninety hours by NKVD officers led by under instruction to force him to confess to being a terrorist, with Stalin's office ringing up "every couple of hours" to find out if he had been broken. He boasted to his chief interrogator, Abram Slutsky that when he was taken before the Soviet premier, Vyacheslav Molotov, he spat in his face. Eventually, worn down by sleep deprivation, on 20 July he signed a confession implicating himself in the Kirov murder and in plots to assassinate Stalin and other leaders, on instruction from Trotsky. Once broken, he was made to confront Ivan Smirnov, who was refusing to co-operate, but did not succeed in breaking him.

As a defendant at the first of the Moscow Show Trials, in which Zinoviev and Kamenev were the main defendants, Mrachkovsky was the first to give evidence, on 19 August 1936, making the first Old Bolshevik to be heard publicly confessing to crimes against the state. He was also the first to deliver a final statement, on 22 August, in which he declared "I depart as a traitor to my Party, as a traitor who should be shot."

Mrachkovsky was rehabilitated by a decree of the USSR Supreme Soviet in August 1988 after a commission appointed by the Politburo had acknowledged that there was no evidence against him or any of his co-defendants.
