= Konstantin Molodtsov =

Konstantin Molodtsov Russian: Константин Молодцо́в
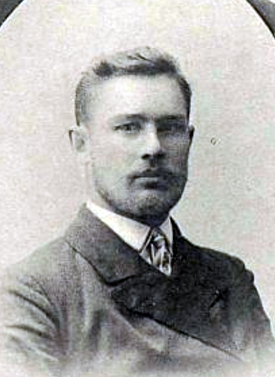
- photo of 1910

Deputy of the Third Imperial Duma
- In office 1 November 1907 – 9 June 1912
- Monarch: Nicholas II

Personal details
- Born: Konstantin Ivanovich Molodtsov; 20 May 1873 Tobolsk Governorate, Russian Empire
- Died: after 1912
- Party: Constitutional Democratic Party

Konstantin Ivanovich Molodtsov (sometimes Molodtsev, Russian: Константи́н Ива́нович Молодцо́в; May 20, 1873, Tobolsk Governorate — after 1912) was a peasant, a volost scribe (volostnoy pisar) and a deputy of the Third Imperial Duma from the Tobolsk Governorate between 1907 and 1912. In the Third Duma he joined the fraction of the Constitutional Democratic Party and became a member of three commissions: for resettlement, agricultural and budgetary; he was also a member of the Siberian parliamentary group (an assistant of its secretary).

== Literature ==
- Молодцов Константин Иванович (in Russian) // Государственная дума Российской империи: 1906—1917 / Б. Ю. Иванов, А. А. Комзолова, И. С. Ряховская. — Москва: РОССПЭН, 2008. — P. 380. — 735 p. — ISBN 978-5-8243-1031-3.
- Молодцов (in Russian) // Члены Государственной Думы (портреты и биографии). Третий созыв. 1907—1912 гг. / Сост. М. М. Боиович. — Москва, 1913. — P. 436. — 526 p.
- Павлова С. Первые представители Тобольской губернии в Государственной думе (in Russian) // Тюменские Известия: парламентская газета. — Тюмень, 2013. — 13 июля (№ 119).
