= Aqmola =

Aqmola may refer to:

- Aqmola Oblast (Russian Empire)
- Akmola Region, or Aqmola Region, a province of Kazakhstan
  - Astana, known as Aqmola until 1994, the capital of Kazakhstan
