= Tarsky District =

Tarsky District Тарский район (Russian)
- District
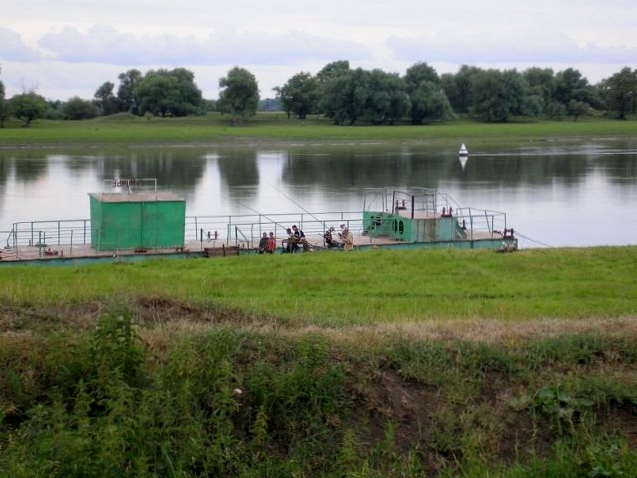
- Fishing from pier in Tarsky District

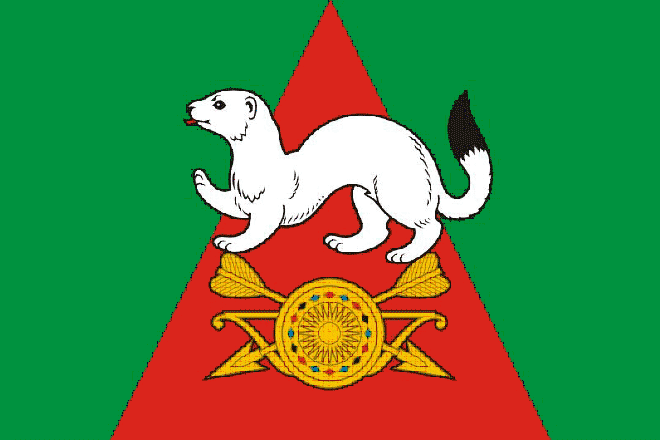
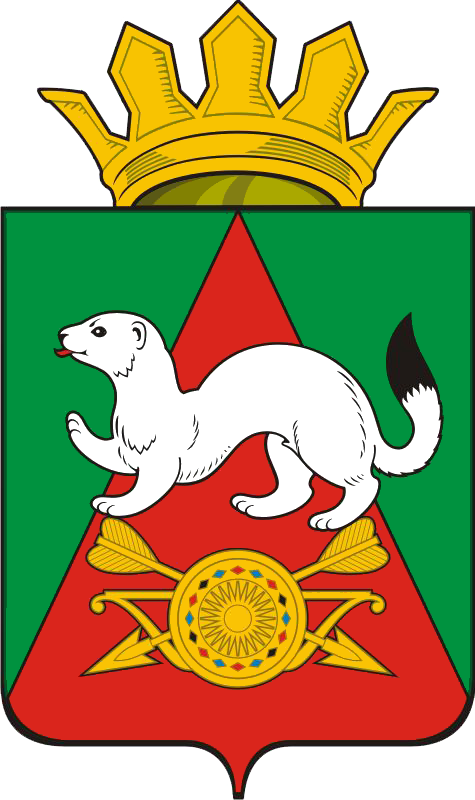
- Flag Coat of arms
- Location of Tarsky District in Omsk Oblast
- Coordinates: 56°54′N 74°22′E
- Country: Russia
- Federal subject: Omsk Oblast
- Established: 19 June 1929
- Administrative center: Tara

Area
  - Total: 15,700 km^{2} (6,100 sq mi)

Population (2010 Census)
  - Total: 19,242
  - Density: 1.23/km^{2} (3.17/sq mi)
  - Urban: 0%
  - Rural: 100%

Administrative structure
  - Administrative divisions: 21 rural okrug
  - Inhabited localities: 74 rural localities

Municipal structure
  - Municipally incorporated as: Tarsky Municipal District
  - Municipal divisions: 1 urban settlements, 21 rural settlements
- Time zone: UTC+6 (MSK+3)
- OKTMO ID: 52654000
- Website: http://tarsk.omskportal.ru/

Tarsky District (Russian: Та́рский райо́н) is an administrative and municipal district (raion), one of the thirty-two in Omsk Oblast, Russia. It is located in the northeast of the oblast. The area of the district is 15,700 square kilometers (6,100 sq mi). Its administrative center is the town of Tara (which is not administratively a part of the district). Population: 19,242 (2010 Census); 22,684 (2002 census); 25,563 (1989 Soviet census).

== Administrative and municipal status ==
Within the framework of administrative divisions, Tarsky District is one of the thirty-two in the oblast. The town of Tara serves as its administrative center, despite being incorporated separately as a town of oblast significance—an administrative unit with the status equal to that of the districts (and which, in addition to Tara, also includes two rural localities).

As a municipal division, the district is incorporated as Tarsky Municipal District, with the town of oblast significance of Tara being incorporated within it as Tara Urban Settlement.
