= Ishimsky District =

Ishimsky District Ишимский район (Russian)
- District
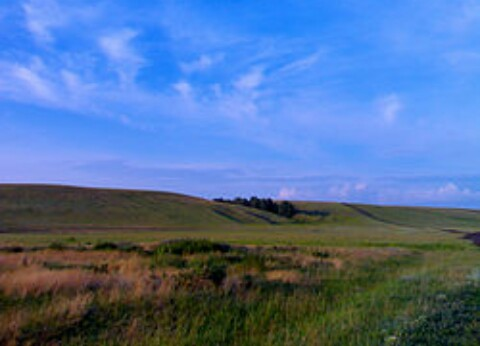
- Ishim Mounds, Ishimsky District

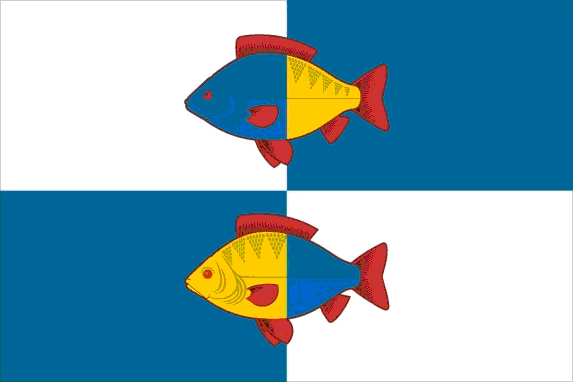
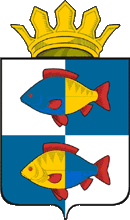
- Flag Coat of arms
- Location of Ishimsky District in Tyumen Oblast
- Coordinates: 56°07′N 69°30′E
- Country: Russia
- Federal subject: Tyumen Oblast
- Established: 10 June 1931
- Administrative center: Ishim

Area
  - Total: 5,500 km^{2} (2,100 sq mi)

Population (2010 Census)
  - Total: 31,085
  - Density: 5.7/km^{2} (15/sq mi)
  - Urban: 0%
  - Rural: 100%

Administrative structure
  - Administrative divisions: 22 rural okrug
  - Inhabited localities: 89 rural localities

Municipal structure
  - Municipally incorporated as: Ishimsky Municipal District
  - Municipal divisions: 0 urban settlements, 22 rural settlements
- Time zone: UTC+5 (MSK+2)
- OKTMO ID: 71626000
- Website: http://ishim-mr.admtyumen.ru/

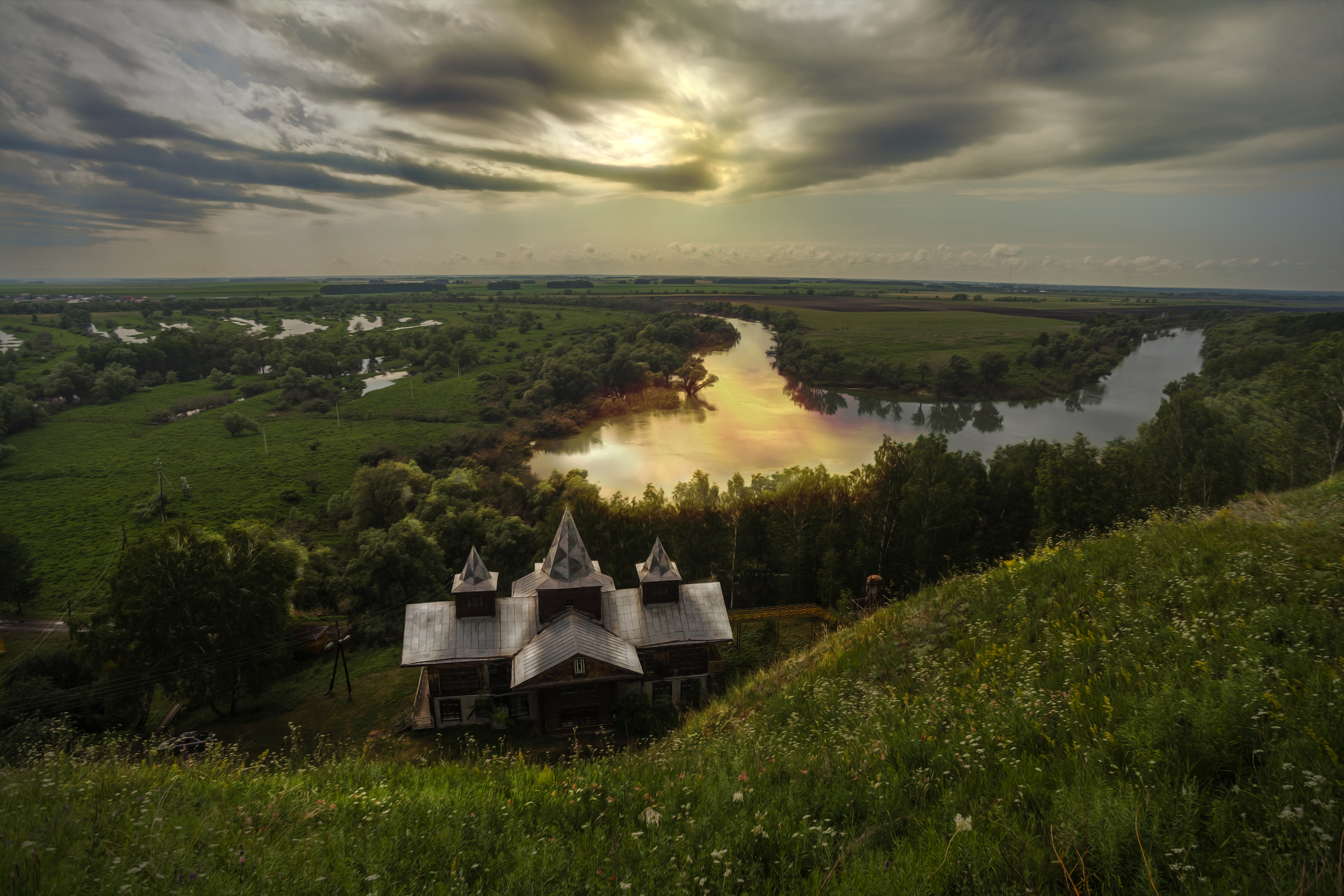
View from Mountain of Love, Ishimsky District

Ishimsky District (Russian: Иши́мский райо́н) is an administrative district (raion), one of the twenty-two in Tyumen Oblast, Russia. Within the framework of municipal divisions, it is incorporated as Ishimsky Municipal District. It is located in the south of the oblast. The area of the district is 5,500 square kilometers (2,100 sq mi). Its administrative center is the town of Ishim (which is not administratively a part of the district). Population: 31,085 (2010 Census); 34,693 (2002 census); 35,063 (1989 Soviet census).

== Geography ==
Ishimsky District is located in the southeast of Tyumen Oblast. The terrain is rolling plain with a forest-steppe landscape. The Ishim River runs south-northeast through the district. About 30% of the area is forested, and about 20% is agricultural cropland. The area is known for a protected forest (Sinitsinsky Bor) with recreational facilities and mineral springs. The district is centrally located in Tymen, with the Trans-Siberian Railway running west–east through the middle, and major highways running west–east and north–south.

Ishimsky District is 220 km southeast of the city of Tyumen, 230 km northwest of the city of Omsk, and 1,900 km east of Moscow. The area measures 90 km (north-south), 75 km (west-east); total area is 5,500 km2 (about 0.4% of Tyumen Oblast).

The district is bordered on the north and northeast by Aromashevsky District and Sorokinsky District, on the east by Abatsky District, on the south by Kazansky District, on the southwest by Berdyuzhsky District, and on the west by Golyshmanovsky District.

== History ==
The first permanent inhabitants are believed to be cattle-herders some 4,000 years ago. Turkic tribes appeared in the 9th century, blending in the people generally referred to as Siberian Tatars. Russians appeared in the 1600s, when Tobolsk sponsored agricultural colonists to the Ishimsky area, and the military outposts to defend them from the Tatars. The black soil (chernozem) was more fertile than that around Tobolsk, and more settlers were drawn in.

Ishimsky District was officially formed in November 1923 as part of the Ural Region. After a brief move to Chelyabinsk region in 1934 and then to Omsk Oblast for 1934-1944, the district was finally transferred to Tymen Oblast in 1944.

== Administrative and municipal status ==
Within the framework of administrative divisions, Ishimsky District is one of the twenty-two in the oblast. The town of Ishim serves as its administrative center, despite being incorporated separately as an administrative unit with the status equal to that of the districts.

As a municipal division, the district is incorporated as Ishimsky Municipal District. The Town of Ishim is incorporated separately from the district as Ishim Urban Okrug.
