= Oblast of Siberian Kirghiz =

Oblast of Siberian Kirghiz Область Сибирских Киргизов (Russian)
- Oblast of Russia
- 1854–1868
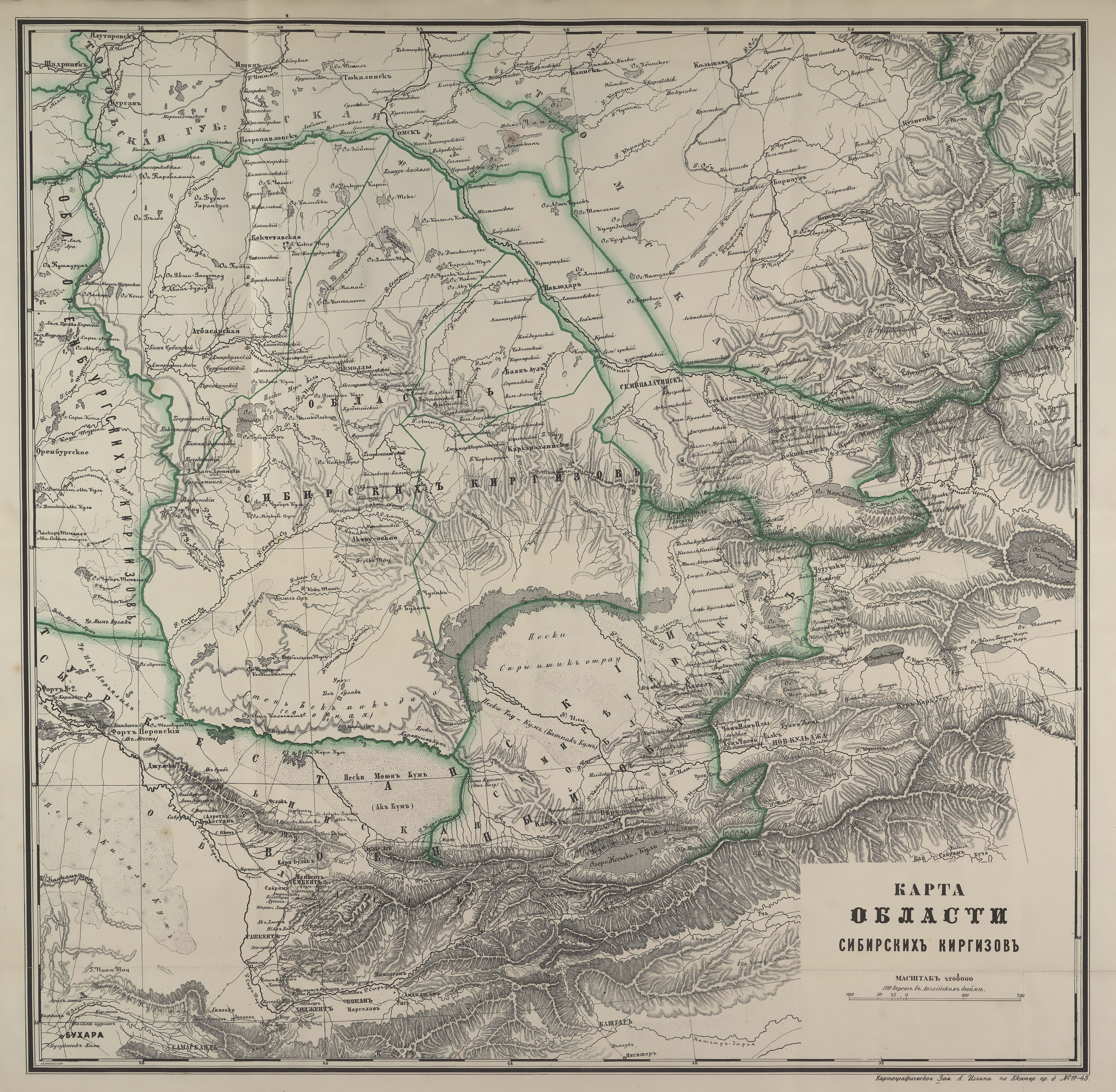
- Siberian Kirghiz in 1864
- Capital: Omsk
- Population
- 277,451
- History
  - Established: 19 May 1854
  - Disestablished: 21 October 1868
Preceded by
Tobolsk Governorate
Jüz
West-Siberian Governorate-General
Succeeded by
Akmolinsk Oblast
Semipalatinsk Oblast
Tobolsk Governorate

The Oblast of Siberian Kirghiz (Russian: Область Сибирских Киргизов) was an administrative-territorial unit of the Russian Empire, which existed from 1854 to 1868. The administrative centre was the city of Omsk.

== History ==
The Oblast was formed by the Supreme Approval on May 19, 1854.

In the personal decree given to the Senate on May 19, 1854, it was stated:

Due to the vastness of the Kirghiz steppe, the Siberian department, having recognized it useful to change the order of its administration in order to develop domestic industry in this region and to provide funds to the Siberian Kirghiz of the left flank, living at a distance from their current main local authorities, to receive the fastest possible resolution of their requests and complaints, We, in accordance with the submission of the Governor-General of Western Siberia, considered in the Ministries according to their affiliation, and the position of the Siberian Committee, command: ... with the separation of the left flank of the steppe, the right flank thereof, consisting of the remaining five districts, to leave under the current administration, renaming it the Region of Siberian Kirghiz. Then the Border Chief of the Siberian Kirghiz shall henceforth be called the Military Governor of the Siberian Kirghiz region, and the Border Administration shall be called the Regional Administration of the Siberian Kirghiz.

The region included the Kokchetav, Kushmurun, Akmola, Bayanaul and Karkaraly districts, populated by Kyrgyz Middle Zhuz.

By the decree of April 12, 1859, the Kush-Murunsky District was abolished, its volosts were included in the Kokchetav District, and the Atbasar District was formed.

The Siberian Kirghiz Region was liquidated by the Personal Decree given to the Senate on October 21, 1868, No. 46380 "On the transformation of the management of the Kirghiz steppes of the Orenburg and Siberian departments and the Ural and Siberian Cossack troops."

To eliminate the difficulties and inconveniences in the management of the Kirghiz steppes of the Orenburg and Siberian departments, as well as the Ural and Siberian Cossack troops, we command: From the regions of the Orenburg and Siberian Kirghiz and Semipalatinsk, in their present composition, and the lands of the Ural and Siberian Cossack troops, to form 4 regions: Ural, Turgai, Akmola and Semipalatinsk...

The territory is divided into Akmola and Semipalatinsk Oblast. Before the opening of Akmola Oblast on January 1, 1869, the city of Omsk was temporarily included in Tobolsk Governorate.

== Administrative division ==
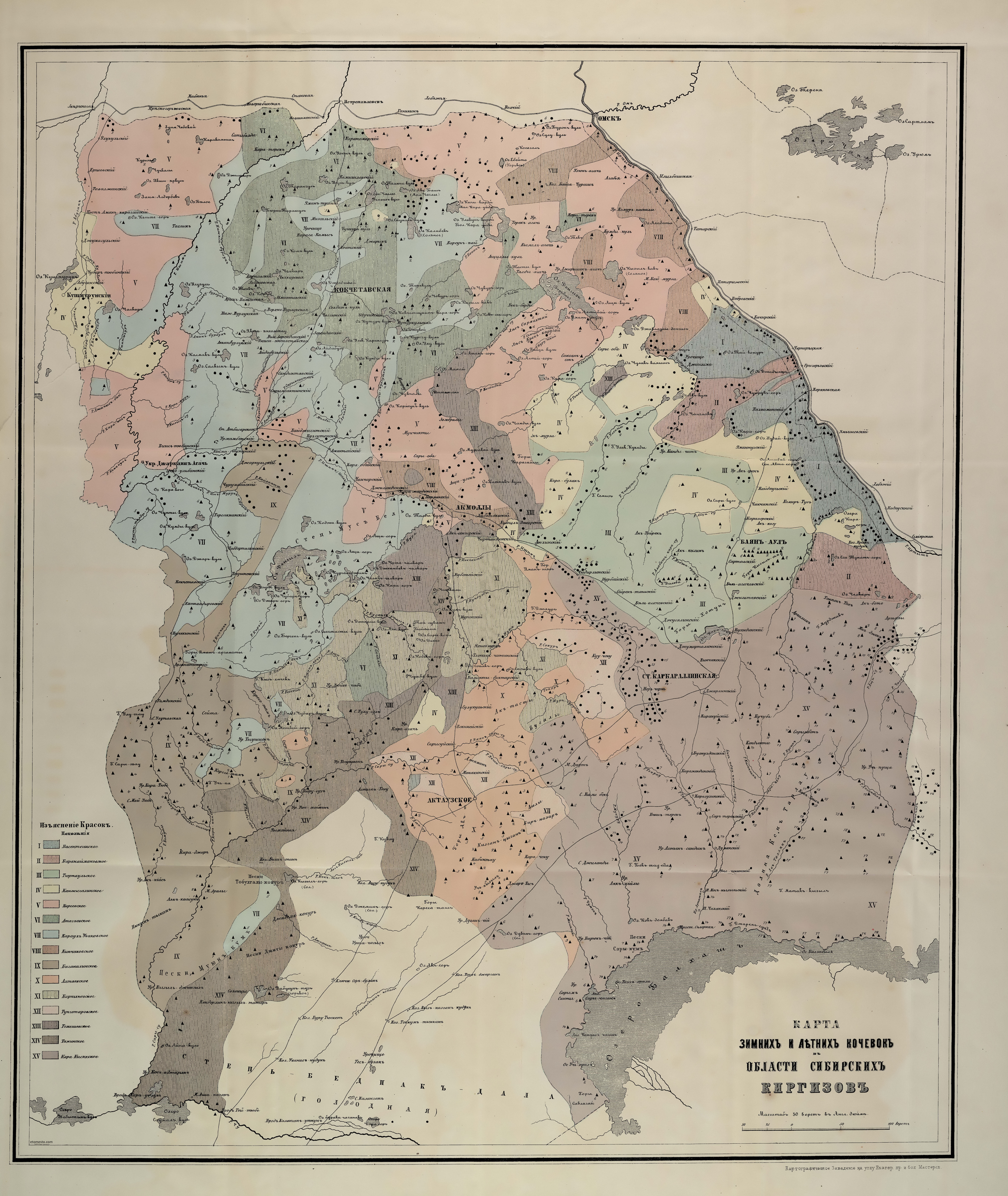
Map of winter and summer migrations in the region of the Siberian Kirghiz (Kazakhs) in 1868

The regional center, the city of Omsk, was not part of the region, being an independent administrative unit located on the territory of the Tobolsk province.

No.	District	Center	Area, versts^{2}	Population (1858), people
1	Akmola	city of Akmola	330,126.0	73,774
2	Bayan-Aulsky	stanitsa Bayan-Aulskaya	57,663.0	37,488
3	Kar-Karalinsky	stanitsa Karkaralinskaya	135,320.0	58,828
4	Kokchetavsky	city Kokchetav	142,156.0	73,174
5	Kush-Murunsky	village Kush-Murunskaya	38,446.0	18,562

== Symbolism ==
The Siberian Kirghiz Region did not have an approved coat of arms.

A draft coat of arms for this region is known - in a red field of the shield, Cossack pikes laid crosswise, on top of which is a horse's head. In 1868, this concept of the coat of arms will be used for the coat of arms of the Turgay Region.

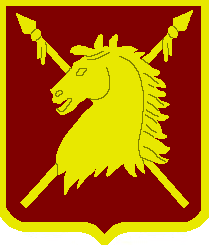
Unapproved coat of arms of the Siberian Kirghiz Region

== Regional leadership ==
=== Military governors ===
Full name	Title, rank, rank	Time of holding the position
Gustav Karlovich von Friedrichs II	Baron Lieutenant General, Acting	31.07.1854—22.01.1858
Fyodor Andreevich Panov	Lieutenant General	09.03.1858—29.11.1866
Nikolai Andreevich Okolnichy	Major General	27.03.1866—2.01.1869

== Literature ==
- Books for Schools. No. 53. Regions of Siberian and Orenburg Kirghiz. Published by the Society for the Distribution of Useful Books. Printed by S. P. Yakovlev. Moscow. 1872.
- Materials for the Geography and Statistics of Russia, Collected by Officers of the General Staff. Region of Siberian Kirghiz. Part 1. Compiled by Lieutenant Colonel Krasovsky of the General Staff. Printed in the printing houses of: Transhel, Retger and Schneider. Saint Petersburg. 1868.
- Materials for the geography and statistics of Russia, collected by officers of the General Staff. The region of the Siberian Kirghiz. Part 2. Compiled by Lieutenant Colonel Krasovsky of the General Staff. Printed in the printing houses of: Transhel, Retger and Schneider. Saint Petersburg. 1868.
- Materials for the geography and statistics of Russia, collected by officers of the General Staff. The region of the Siberian Kirghiz. Part 3. Compiled by the adjutant of the General Staff Lieutenant Colonel Krasovsky. Printed in the printing houses of: Transhel, Retger and Schneider. Saint Petersburg. 1868.
- Statistical tables of the Russian Empire, published, by order of the Ministry of Internal Affairs, by the Central Statistical Committee. Second issue. The current population of the empire for 1858 (with a map of the population of European Russia). Editor of the Central Statistical Committee A. Bushen. In the printing house of K. Wulf. Saint Petersburg. 1863.
- Tomsk Provincial Gazette No. 44 November 10, 1861. Tomsk (A look at the economic and social life of the Kirghiz: from Rusanov's travel notes)
