= Siberian Revolutionary Committee =

Russian Civil War

The Siberian Revolutionary Committee (Sibrevcom) (Russian: Сибирский революционный комитет, Сибревком) was an extraordinary organ of the Soviet power's revolutionary committee in Siberia created during the Russian Civil War under the circumstances preventing the formal creation of constitutional organs of government. Established on August 27, 1919, it functioned from September 1919 until December 1, 1925, when the Siberian Krai was formed.

== See also ==
- Omsk Governorate
