= Akmolinsk Oblast (Russian Empire) =

Oblast of the Russian Empire and RSFSR (1868–1920)

Coordinates: 54.9667°N 73.3833°E

Akmolinsk Oblast Акмолинская область (Russian)
- Oblast of the Russian Empire
- 1868–1920
- Coat of arms

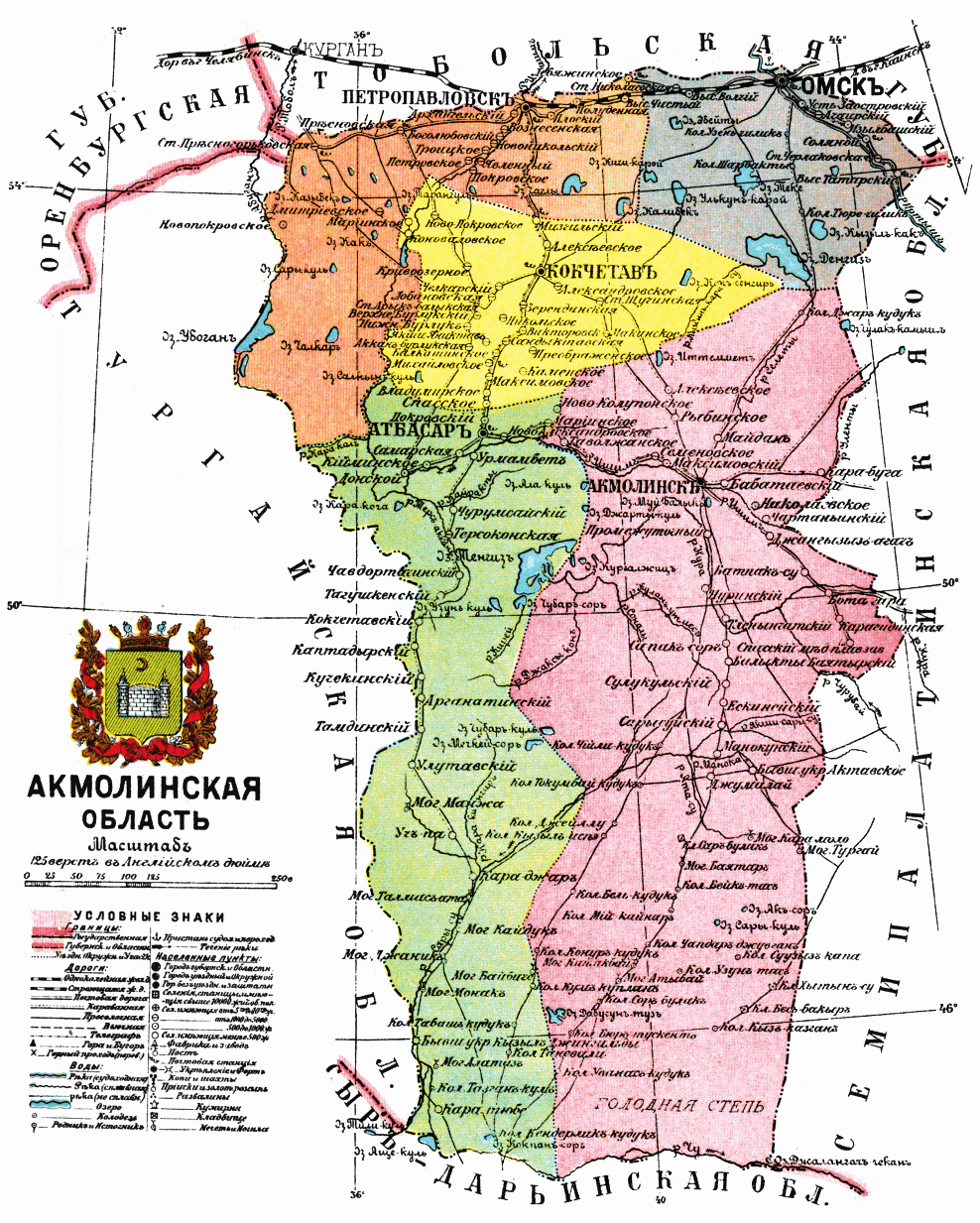
- Map of Akmolinsk Oblast

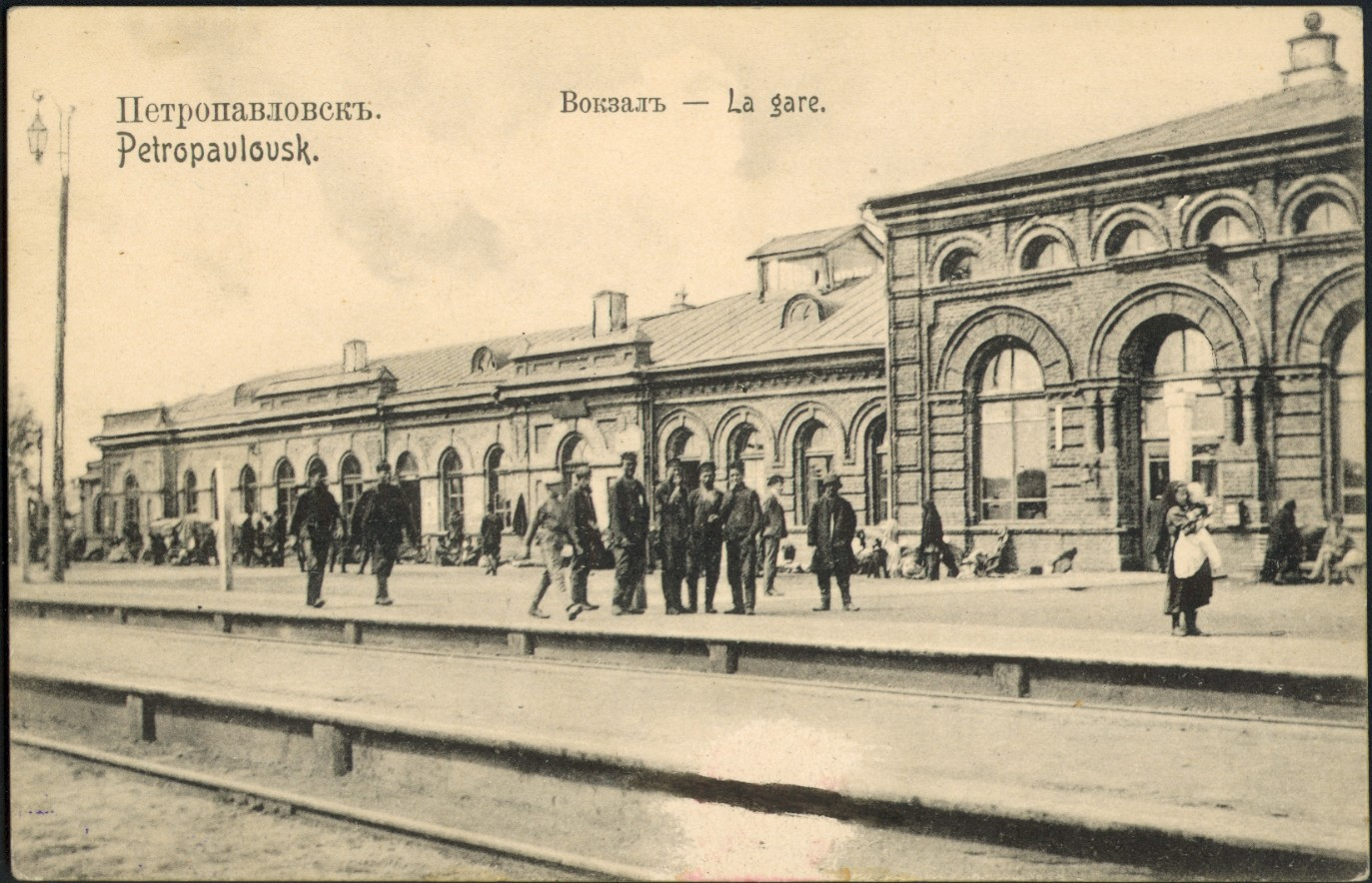
- Capital: Omsk
- History
  - Established: 21 October 1868
  - Disestablished: 3 January 1920
Preceded by	Succeeded by
Oblast of Siberian Kirghiz; Tobolsk Governorate	Omsk Governorate
- Today part of: Kazakhstan; Russia

Akmolinsk Oblast (Russian: Акмо́линская область) was an Oblast (province) of the Russian Empire. It roughly corresponded to most of present-day northern Kazakhstan and the southern part of Omsk Oblast in Russia. It was formerly part of Kazakh khanate. It was created after the division of the Oblast of Siberian Kirghiz into the Akmolinsk and Semipalatinsk Oblasts on 21 October 1868. Its center was Omsk and consisted of uezds of Akmolinsk, Atbasar, Kokchetav, Omsk and Petropavlovsk. It bordered Tobolsk Governorate to the north, Semipalatinsk Oblast to the east, Syr-Darya Oblast to the south, Turgay Oblast to the southwest and Orenburg Governorate to the northwest.

== Demographics ==
As of 1897, 682,608 people populated the oblast. Kazakhs constituted the majority of the population. Significant minorities consisted of Russians and Ukrainians. Total Turkic speaking were 438,889 (64.2%).

=== Ethnic groups in 1897 ===
TOTAL	682,608	100%
Kazakhs	427,389	62.6%
Russians	174,292	25.5%
Ukrainians	51,103	7.5%
Tatars	10,819	1.6%

After the defeat of the White Army in the Russian Civil War, it was renamed as Omsk Governorate on 3 January 1920.
