= Turinsky Uyezd =

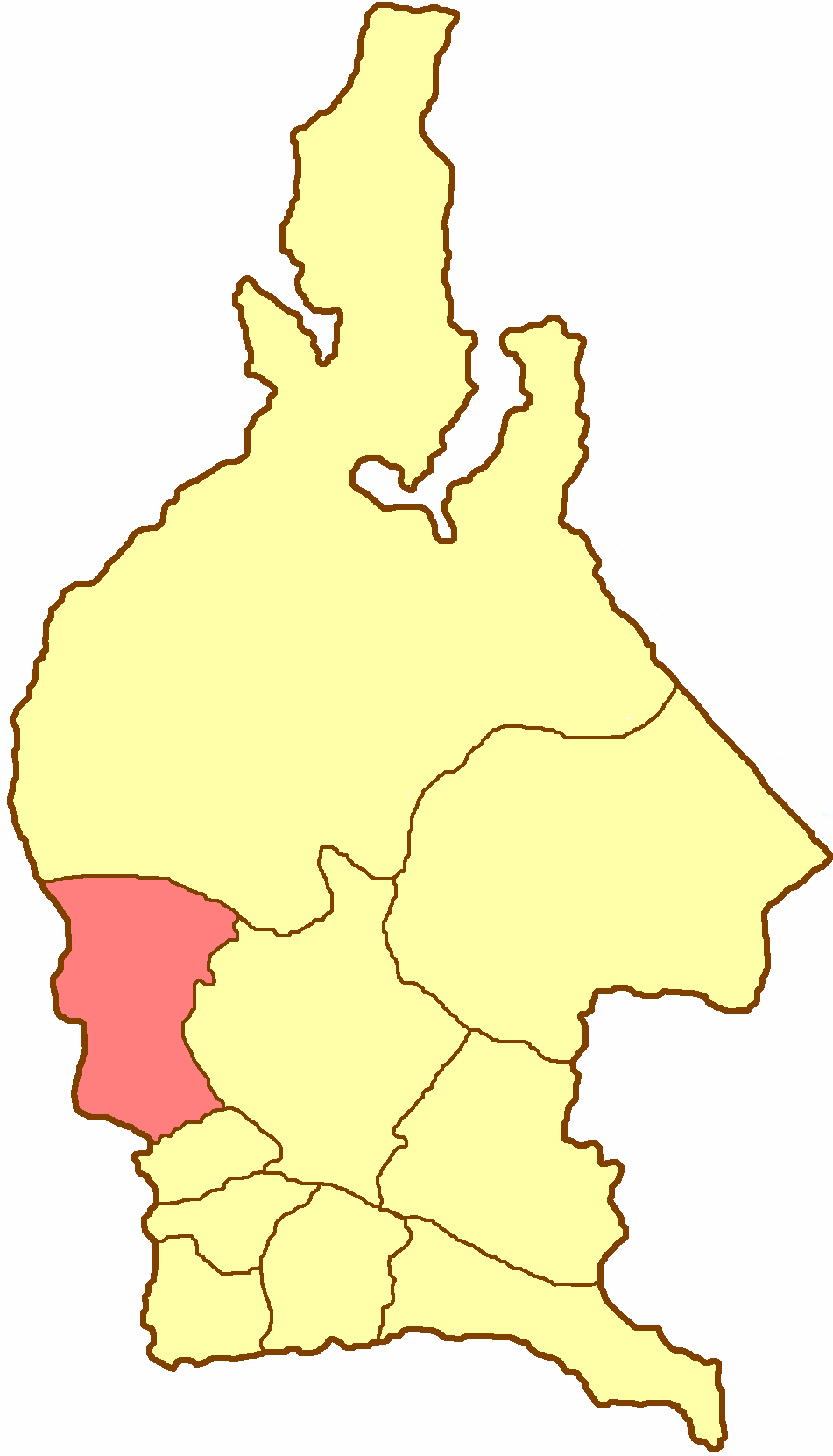

Turinsky Uyezd (Туринский уезд) was one of the subdivisions of the Tobolsk Governorate of the Russian Empire. It was situated in the western part of the governorate. Its administrative centre was Turinsk.

== Demographics ==
At the time of the Russian Empire Census of 1897, Turinsky Uyezd had a population of 68,719. Of these, 93.2% spoke Russian, 5.1% Mansi, 0.7% Ukrainian, 0.5% Siberian Tatar, 0.2% Polish, 0.1% Romani and 0.1% Komi-Zyrian as their native language.
