= Tobolsky Uyezd =

Uyezd of Tobolsk Governorate, Russian Empire

Tobolsky Uyezd (Тобольский уезд) was one of the subdivisions of the Tobolsk Governorate of the Russian Empire. It was situated in the central part of the governorate. Its administrative centre was Tobolsk.

== Demographics ==
At the time of the Russian Empire Census of 1897, Tobolsky Uyezd had a population of 127,860. Of these, 77.0% spoke Russian, 17.6% Siberian Tatar, 1.8% Khanty, 1.0% Yiddish, 1.0% Mansi, 0.5% Polish, 0.5% Ukrainian, 0.1% Mordvin, 0.1% German and 0.1% Adyghe as their native language.
