= Tara, Omsk Oblast =

Town in Omsk Oblast, Russia

Tara Тара
- Town
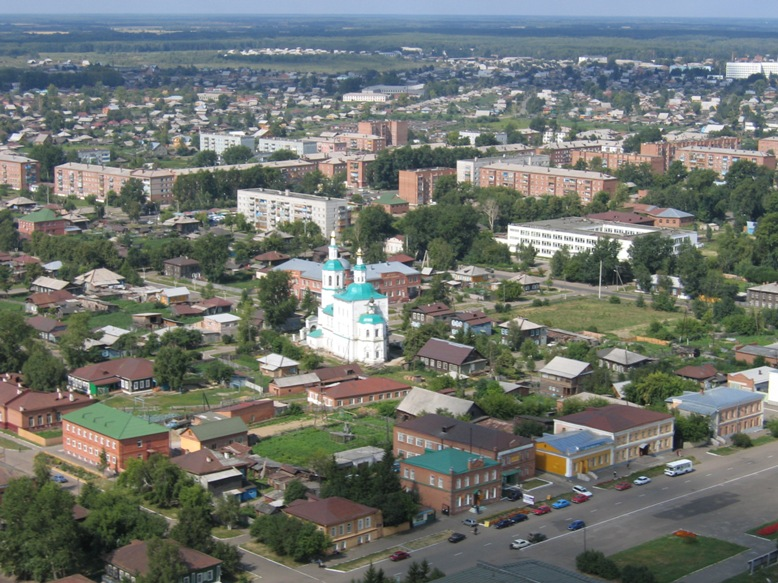
- View of Tara

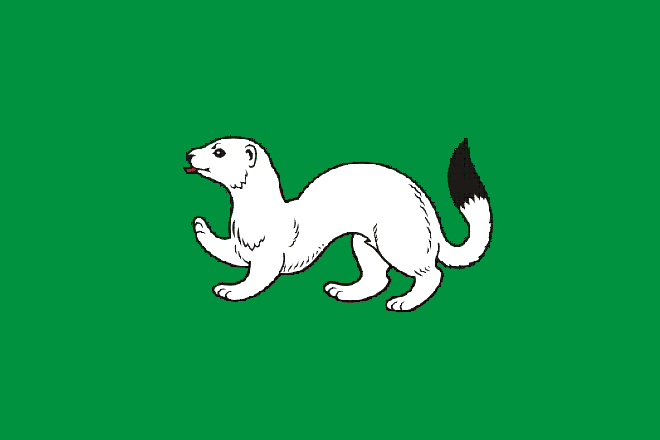
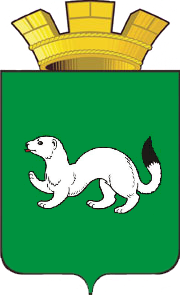
- Flag Coat of arms
- Interactive map of Tara
- Location of Tara Tara (Omsk Oblast)
- Coordinates: 56°53′N 74°22′E
- Country: Russia
- Federal subject: Omsk Oblast
- Founded: ca. 1594

Government
  - Head: Yevgeny Mikheyev
- Elevation: 70 m (230 ft)

Population (2010 Census)
  - Total: 27,318
  - Estimate (2025): 26,874 (−1.6%)

Administrative status
  - Subordinated to: town of oblast significance of Tara
  - Capital of: Tarsky District, town of oblast significance of Tara

Municipal status
  - Municipal district: Tarsky Municipal District
  - Urban settlement: Tara Urban Settlement
  - Capital of: Tarsky Municipal District, Tara Urban Settlement
- Time zone: UTC+6 (MSK+3)
- Postal codes: 646530, 646531, 646532, 646535, 646536, 646539
- OKTMO ID: 52654101001

Tara (Russian: Та́ра; Siberian Tatar: Тар Tar) is a town in Omsk Oblast, Russia, located at the confluence of the Tara and Irtysh Rivers at a point where the forested country merges into the steppe, about 300 kilometers (190 mi) north of Omsk, the administrative center of the oblast. As of 2021, the town's population was 26,878.

== Etymology ==
Name of the town comes from the river Tara, which is named after the Siberian Tatar word Tar, which means not wide, narrow (river).

== History ==
It was founded as a fort around 1594 as a direct result of Yermak's incursions into Siberia, and as such is one of the oldest towns in the region. Tara pre-dates many of Siberia's larger cities and for many years served as a gateway for further eastward settlement. Omsk, which subsequently eclipsed Tara in importance, was founded at the request of Tara's military commanders.

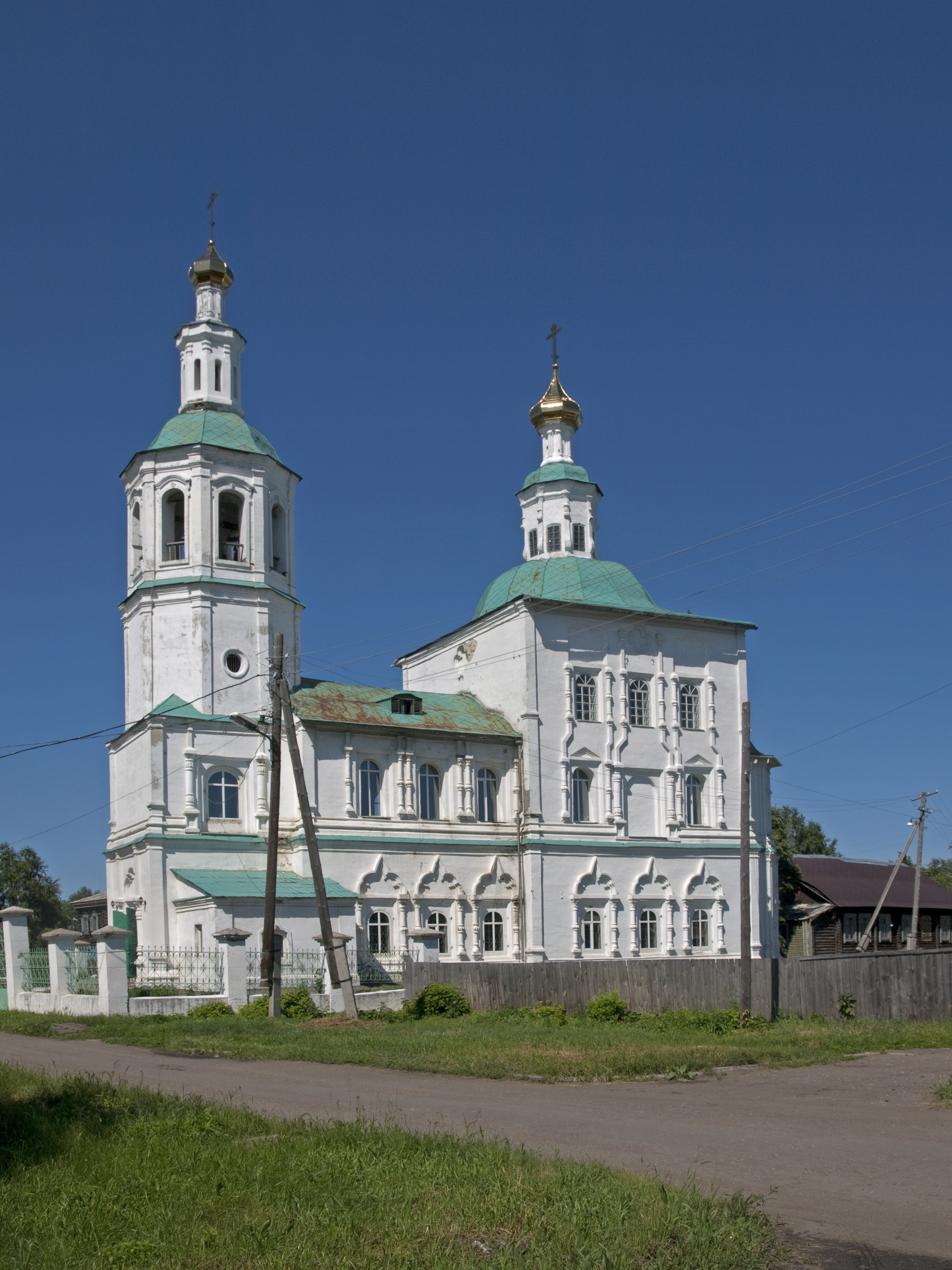
The St. Savior Church in Tara

Tara's historical churches recall a time when it was one of only two cities in Tobolsk Eparchy and Tara served as the first administrative division of the Russian Orthodox Church in Siberia. In the 18th–19th centuries, Tara was also the seat of Tarsky Uyezd of Tobolsk Governorate, with jurisdiction over Omsk.

Its early prominence notwithstanding, major developments in later history, including the 18th-century "Great Siberian Road" and the late 19th-century Trans-Siberian Railway, bypassed the town while spurring growth in other areas of Siberia.

In the 1930s, Tara was the administrative center of Tara Okrug, a part of Omsk Oblast, which at that time stretched from the Kazakh steppes in the south to the Arctic Ocean in the north.

In 1943, Tara was designated the administrative center of Tarsky District of redefined Omsk Oblast. It is still mentioned in the title of Archbishop of Omsk and Tara, whose authority is now limited to the oblast. Tara has been dropping in regional population rankings, slipping behind the towns of Isilkul, Kalachinsk, and Nazyvayevsk, all of which are located on the Trans-Siberian Railway.

== Administrative and municipal status ==
Within the framework of administrative divisions, Tara serves as the administrative center of Tarsky District, even though it is not a part of it. As an administrative division, it is, together with two rural localities, incorporated separately as the town of oblast significance of Tara—an administrative unit with the status equal to that of the districts. As a municipal division, the town of oblast significance of Tara is incorporated within Tarsky Municipal District as Tara Urban Settlement.

== Economy ==
In the 2000s, Tara somewhat revived economically after the general collapse of the 1990s. The construction of an automobile bridge across the Irtysh River completed the Tomsk–Tara–Tobolsk highway, a northern parallel to the railway. It has made Tara much more accessible, while the exploration and exploitation of the Krapivinskoye Oilfield in the north of the oblast have led to increased tanker traffic to Omsk, as well as a construction of a small refinery.

== Climate ==
Tara has a humid continental climate (Köppen climate classification Dfb) bordering on a subarctic climate (Köppen Dfc), with very cold winters and mild summers. Precipitation is quite low, but is significantly higher in summer than at other times of the year.

Climate data for Tara
Month	Jan	Feb	Mar	Apr	May	Jun	Jul	Aug	Sep	Oct	Nov	Dec	Year
Record high °C (°F)	5.0 (41.0)	7.2 (45.0)	12.4 (54.3)	28.4 (83.1)	36.4 (97.5)	39.0 (102.2)	40.0 (104.0)	33.1 (91.6)	32.5 (90.5)	23.9 (75.0)	11.1 (52.0)	4.7 (40.5)	40.0 (104.0)
Mean daily maximum °C (°F)	−14.5 (5.9)	−11.7 (10.9)	−3.4 (25.9)	7.0 (44.6)	16.6 (61.9)	22.3 (72.1)	24.1 (75.4)	20.7 (69.3)	14.9 (58.8)	5.5 (41.9)	−5.2 (22.6)	−11.8 (10.8)	5.4 (41.7)
Daily mean °C (°F)	−18.9 (−2.0)	−17.2 (1.0)	−9.3 (15.3)	1.8 (35.2)	10.3 (50.5)	16.3 (61.3)	18.4 (65.1)	15.1 (59.2)	9.2 (48.6)	1.4 (34.5)	−8.9 (16.0)	−16.1 (3.0)	0.2 (32.3)
Mean daily minimum °C (°F)	−23.8 (−10.8)	−22.8 (−9.0)	−15.2 (4.6)	−3.2 (26.2)	4.1 (39.4)	10.0 (50.0)	12.6 (54.7)	9.8 (49.6)	4.5 (40.1)	−2.2 (28.0)	−12.9 (8.8)	−20.9 (−5.6)	−5.0 (23.0)
Record low °C (°F)	−49.2 (−56.6)	−46.6 (−51.9)	−43.9 (−47.0)	−31.1 (−24.0)	−12.2 (10.0)	−2.8 (27.0)	0.0 (32.0)	−3.0 (26.6)	−9.3 (15.3)	−30.8 (−23.4)	−47.7 (−53.9)	−50.1 (−58.2)	−50.1 (−58.2)
Average precipitation mm (inches)	19.1 (0.75)	13.5 (0.53)	15.0 (0.59)	22.7 (0.89)	38.6 (1.52)	61.1 (2.41)	65.6 (2.58)	60.2 (2.37)	43.2 (1.70)	37.4 (1.47)	28.0 (1.10)	25.1 (0.99)	429.5 (16.9)
Average precipitation days (≥ 0.1 mm)	19.3	16.1	15.7	11.6	11.5	11.8	9.3	12.7	12.4	16.2	21.6	22.2	180.4
Average relative humidity (%)	80.0	77.5	72.3	63.0	59.9	69.1	73.8	77.5	75.6	76.9	84.1	81.9	74.3
Mean monthly sunshine hours	68.2	127.4	179.4	240.0	275.9	298.5	308.5	235.6	162.0	94.6	60.0	52.7	2,102.8
Source: climatebase.ru

== Notable people ==
- Abdurreshid Ibrahim (1857–1944), Muslim writer and traveller who sought to unite the Crimean Tatars
- Yuri Sipko (born 1952), Baptist pastor, president of the Russian Union of Evangelical Christians-Baptists
