= Beryozovsky Uyezd =

Subdivisions of the Tobolsk Governorate of Russia

Beryozovsky Uyezd (Берёзовский уезд) was one of the subdivisions of the Tobolsk Governorate of the Russian Empire. It was situated in the northern part of the governorate. Its administrative centre was Beryozovo.

== Demographics ==
At the time of the Russian Empire Census of 1897, Beryozovsky Uyezd had a population of 21,411. Of these, 51.8% spoke Khanty, 20.7% Nenets, 17.5% Russian, 9.4% Komi-Zyrian, 0.3% Mansi, 0.1% Yiddish and 0.1% Polish as their native language.

== See also ==
- Beryozovsky District, Khanty-Mansi Autonomous Okrug
