= Kurgansky Uyezd =

Kurgansky Uyezd (Курганский уезд) was one of the subdivisions of the Tobolsk Governorate of the Russian Empire. It was situated in the southwestern part of the governorate. Its administrative centre was Kurgan.

== Demographics ==
At the time of the Russian Empire Census of 1897, Kurgansky Uyezd had a population of 260,095. Of these, 98.8% spoke Russian, 0.5% Ukrainian, 0.2% Polish, 0.1% Kazakh, 0.1% Romani, 0.1% Mordvin and 0.1% Siberian Tatar as their native language.
