= Tyukalinsky Uyezd =

Tyukalinsky Uyezd (Тюкалинский уезд) was one of the subdivisions of the Tobolsk Governorate of the Russian Empire. It was situated in the southeastern part of the governorate. Its administrative centre was Tyukalinsk.

== Demographics ==
At the time of the Russian Empire Census of 1897, Tyukalinsky Uyezd had a population of 208,718. Of these, 81.9% spoke Russian, 9.5% Ukrainian, 2.5% Kazakh, 1.4% Latvian, 0.9% Belarusian, 0.8% Estonian, 0.8% Komi-Zyrian, 0.7% Polish, 0.4% Mordvin, 0.3% German, 0.3% Finnish, 0.2% Yiddish, 0.1% Siberian Tatar and 0.1% Romani as their native language.
