= Yalutorovsky Uyezd =

Yalutorovsky Uyezd (Ялуторовский уезд) was one of the subdivisions of the Tobolsk Governorate of the Russian Empire. It was situated in the southwestern part of the governorate. Its administrative centre was Yalutorovsk.

== Demographics ==
At the time of the Russian Empire Census of 1897, Yalutorovsky Uyezd had a population of 188,450. Of these, 94.8% spoke Russian, 2.9% Siberian Tatar, 1.3% Komi-Zyrian, 0.5% Ukrainian, 0.2% Polish, 0.1% Romani and 0.1% Yiddish as their native language.
