= Tobolsk Governorate =

1796–1920 unit of Russia

Coordinates: 58.1953°N 68.2581°E

Tobolsk Governorate Тобольская губерния (Russian)
- Governorate of the Russian Empire (1796–1917), Russian Republic and RSFSR (1917–1920)
- 1796–1920
- Coat of arms

- Location in the Russian Empire
- Capital: Tobolsk (1796–1919); Tyumen (1919–1920)
- Area
  - 1916: 1,385,000 km^{2} (535,000 sq mi)
- Population
  - 1897: 1,433,043
- History
  - Established: 1796
  - Disestablished: 1920
Preceded by
Tobolsk Viceroyalty
Oblast of Siberian Kirghiz
Succeeded by
Tyumen Governorate
Tomsk Governorate
Akmolinsk Oblast
Oblast of Siberian Kirghiz
- Today part of: Russia

Tobolsk Governorate (Russian: Тобольская губерния, romanized: Tobol'skaya guberniya) was an administrative-territorial unit (guberniya) of the Russian Empire, Russian Republic and Russian SFSR located in the Ural Mountains and Siberia. It existed from 1796 to 1920; its seat was in the city of Tobolsk, and from 1919 to 1920, in the city of Tyumen.

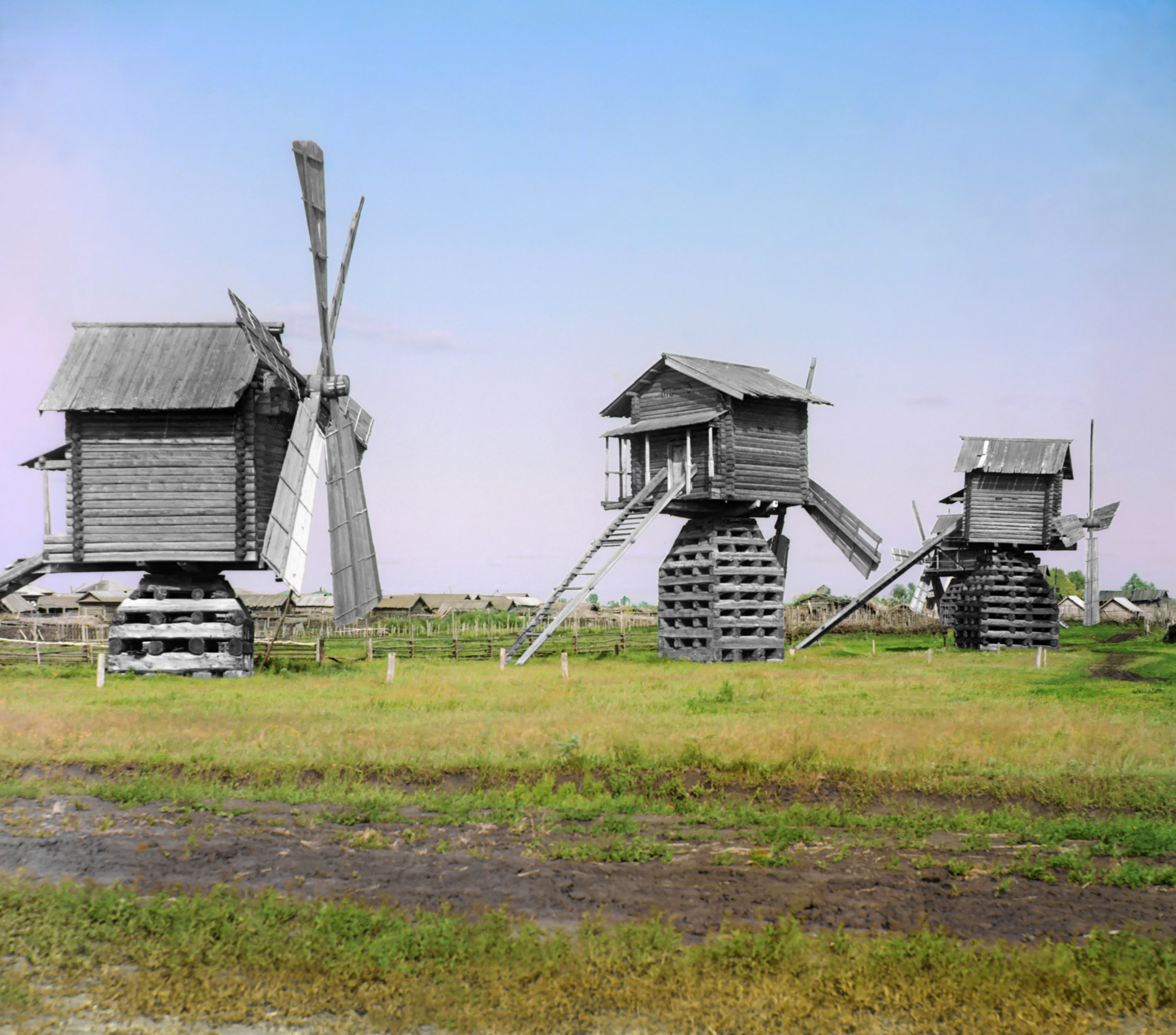
Windmills in the Yalutorovsky uezd of the Tobolsk Governorate (1912). Color photo by Sergei Prokudin-Gorskii.

== General information ==
Its total area as of 1913 was 1,300,000 km^{2} (500,000 sq mi). According to data at the end of the 19th century, the area of the Governorate was divided into 10 uezds (until 1898, okrugs).

== History ==
=== 18th century ===
In official documents of the second half of the 18th century, the name Tobolsk Governorate is often used as a designation for Siberia Governorate in the last stage of its existence (1764–1782).

On 19 January (30 January) 1782, Tobolsk Governorate was formed by decree of the Empress of Russia Catherine II as part of the Tobolsk Viceroyalty with two oblasts: Tobolsk Oblast (included ten uezds) and Tomsk Oblast (six uezds), which became part of the Governorate-General.

On 12 December 1796, the Tobolsk Governorate was formed by Emperor Paul I's Decree to the Senate "On the new division of the State into the Governorates". Kolyvan Oblast was annexed to Tobolsk Governorate.

In 1797, Tobolsk Governorate consisted of 16 uezds: Kuznetsk Uezd, Semipalatinsk Uezd, Krasnoyarsk Uezd, Ishimsky Uezd, Yalutorovsky Uezd, Kurgansky Uezd, Beryozovsky Uezd, Tarsky Uezd, Turinsky Uezd, Tyumensky Uezd, Tobolsky Uezd, Surgutsky Uezd, Tomsk Uezd, Narymsky Uezd, Yenisei Uezd, and Turukhansky Uezd.

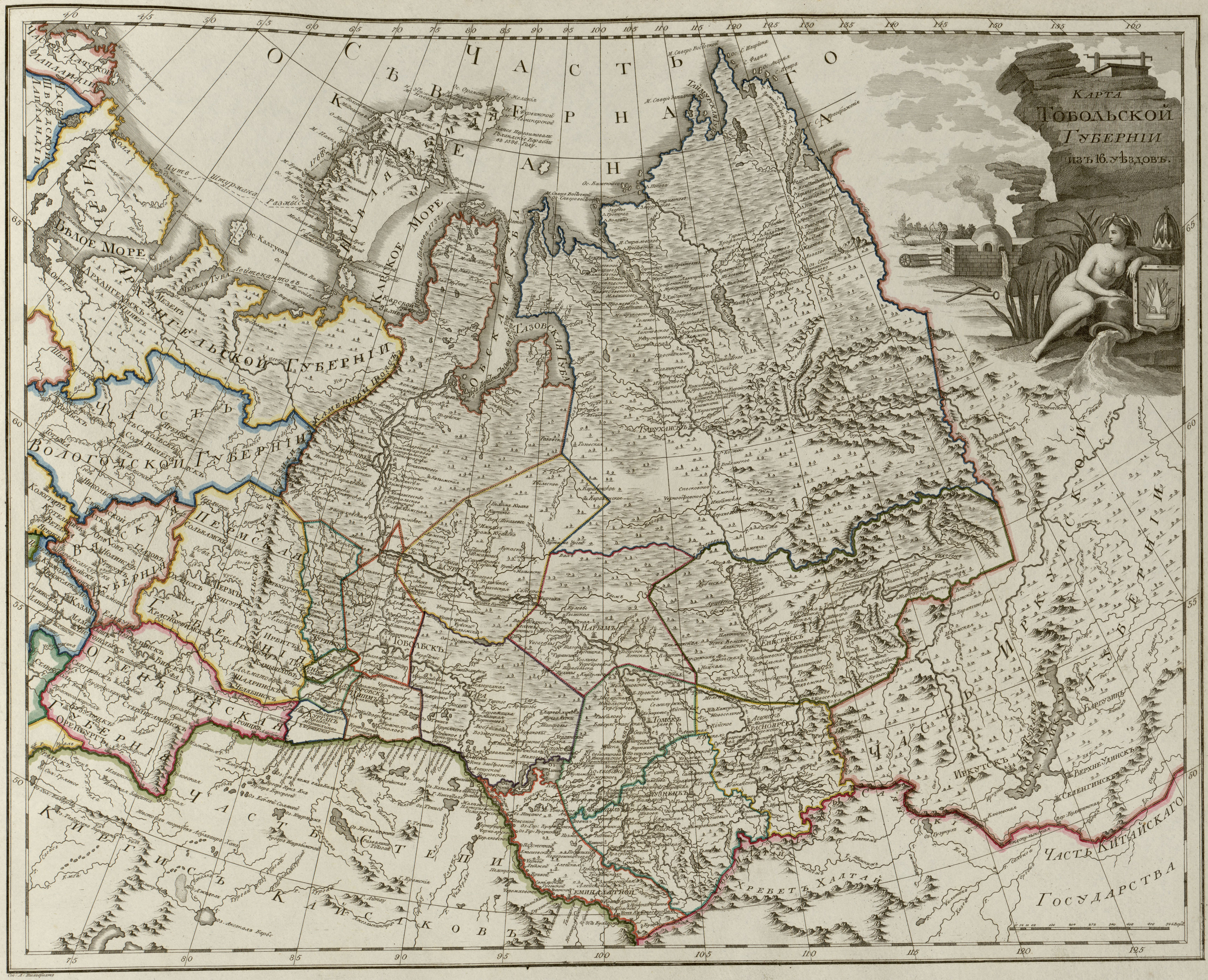
Tobolsk Governorate (16 uezds), Atlas of Russian Empire (Alexander Wilbrecht Mikhaylovich, 1800).

=== 19th century ===
The map of Tobolsk Governorate (16 uezds) from the publication "The Russian Atlas of forty-three maps consisting of forty-one provinces dividing the Empire" (Alexander Wilbrecht, 1800) shows the vast Siberian province of Tobol'sk with the borders of the province and its districts, population centers, monasteries, winter encampments, fortresses, mines, salt and fish industries, and the routes of voyages by Malygin Stepan (1734, 1735), Aleksej Ivanovič Skuratov (1734, 1735), Dmitry Ovtsyn (1735), Stepan Voinovich Muravyov (1737), Pavlov Mikhail Stepanovich (1737), Rozmyslov Feodor (1768), and the location where Dutch ships wintered in 1596. The title of this map is in an artistic cartouche with a drawing of a hunting scene, mining symbols, and a maiden with an urn – an allegorical symbol of the Ob' River.

In 1802, the Tobolsk Governorate along with the Irkutsk Governorate, became part of the Siberian General Governorate by decree of Emperor Alexander I.

In 1822, the Siberian General Governorate was divided into the West Siberian General Governorate and East Siberian General Governorate. Tobolsk Governorate became part of the West Siberian General Governorate, which existed until 1882.

On 26 February (9 March) 1804, part of the territory of the Tobolsk Governorate was allocated to the Tomsk Governorate. As part of the Tobolsk Governorate nine uezds remained: Beryozovsky Uezd, Ishimsky Uezd, Kurgansky Uezd, Omsky Uezd, Tarsky Uezd, Tobolsky Uezd, Turinsky Uezd, Tyumensky Uezd and Yalutorovsky Uezd.

In 1822, the Omsk Uezd and other territories were transferred to the Omsk Oblast (until 1838); the uezds of the Tobolsk Governorate were renamed okrugs, and the new Tyukalinsky Okrug was formed (which remained until 1838).

In 1838, the okrug city of Omsk became part of the Tobolsk Governorate.

In 1868 Omsk was transferred to the newly formed the Akmolinsk Oblast. The Surgut Okrug was newly formed by separation from the Berezovsky Okrug.

In 1876, the Omsk District was transformed into the Tyukalinsky District.

Tobolsk Governorate was among the 17 regions recognized as seriously affected during the famine of 1891–1892.

In 1898, the okrugs of the governorate were renamed uyezds.

In 1885, permanent traffic was opened along the railway lines Yekaterinburg–Tura (Tyumen), and in 1896 Chelyabinsk–Omsk–Novonikolaevsk of the Trans-Siberian Railway.

=== 20th century ===
Between 1909 and 1916, Sergey Mikhailovich Prokudin-Gorsky, pioneer of color photography, traveled a significant part of the Russian Empire including Tobolsk Governorate, photographing ancient temples, monasteries, factories, types of cities and various household scenes.

In 1917, after the Bolsheviks came to power, the first attempt to organize Kalachinsky Uezd from part of Tyukalinsky Uezd occurred for convenient control of the remote southeastern territories of the governorate. The first member of the food committee from Kalachinsky Uezd was Yakov Martynovich Kalnin, a Latvian poet and teacher. From 1917 to 1919, in the ups and downs of the Civil War, the uezd was liquidated more than once and re-created by different authorities, transferred from the Tobolsk Governorate to the Akmolinsk Oblast (Omsk).

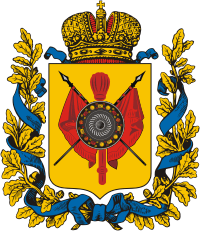
Coat of arms of the Tobolsk Governorate (1878)

On 1 January (14 January), 1918, according to the decree Article No.158 of administration of the Council of People's Commissars of the USSR, the Troitskaya volost of the Tyukalinsky Uezd was included in the newly formed Tatarsky Uezd of the Akmolinsk Oblast.

On 1 February (10 February), 1918, the First Extraordinary Session of the Tobolsk Governorate Zemstvo Assembly approved the separation of Kalachinsky Uezd from Tyukalinsky Uezd; Tarsky Uezd and Tyukalinsky Uezd moved to the Omsk Oblast. Kurgan Uezd remained an independent governorate, proclaimed Tyumen Governorate with Ishimsky Uezd, Yalutorovsky Uezd, Tyumensky Uezd and Turinsky Uezd.

Soviet power was established by the spring of 1918.

On 3–5 April 1918, the Soviet governorate conference decided to transfer the administrative center from Tobolsk to Tyumen and rename the province to Tyumen. The Tobolsk Soviets opposed this and on 30 April 1918 proclaimed themselves a separate governorate.

In June 1918, the Tobolsk Governorate came under the control of the White Army. The revolt of the Czechoslovak Legion temporarily restored the status quo.

From August to November 1919, as a result of the offensive of the Eastern Front, Tyumen and Tobolsk passed to the Bolsheviks and the governorate institutions moved to Tyumen.

On 27 August 1919, by the decree of the All-Russian Central Executive Committee of the RSFSR, Tobolsk Governorate consisted of the following six uezds: Obdorsky Uezd, Beryozovsky Uezd, Surgutsky Uezd, Tobolsky Uezd, Tyumensky Uezd and Yalutorovsky Uezd. Ishimsky Uezd, Tarsky Uezd and Tyukalinsky Uezd (including the territory of Kalachinsky Uezd, which actually existed since 1918, but was not officially registered) went to the Omsk Governorate. Kurgansky Uezd became part of the Chelyabinsk Governorate.

By a decree of the All-Russian Central Executive Committee dated 6 October 1919, Turin Uezd was returned to the Tobolsk Governorate.

From October 1919 to April 1920 the governorate was called either Tobolsk or Tyumen; the renaming of Tobolsk Governorate to Tyumen Governorate was finally fixed by the decree of the All-Russian Central Executive Committee of 21 April (2 March), 1920.

== Coat of arms of the Tobolsk Governorate ==
The coat of arms of the Tobolsk Governorate was approved on 5 July 1878:

"In the golden shield there is a scarlet ataman's mace, on which is Yermak's black shield, round, decorated with precious stones, between two scarlet banners with black shafts and points from a spear placed obliquely across. The shield is surmounted by the Imperial crown and surrounded by golden oak leaves connected by St. Andrew's ribbon."

== Subdivisions ==
No.	Uezd	Uezd Town (population)	Area sq. verst	Population (1916)
1	Beryozovsky Uezd	Beryozovo (1,301)	604,442.2	29,190
2	Ishimsky Uezd	Ishim (14,226)	37,604.6	367,066
3	Kurgansky Uezd	Kurgan (39,854)	20,281.6	359,223
4	Surgutsky Uezd	Surgut (1,602)	220,452.4	11,561
5	Tarsky Uezd	Tara (11,229)	71,542.1	268,410
6	Tobolsky Uezd	Tobolsk (23,357)	108,296.0	147,719
7	Turinsky Uezd	Turinsk (2,821)	67,008.6	96,942
8	Tyukalinsky Uezd	Tyukalinsk (2,702)	55,049.3	344,601
9	Tyumensky Uezd	Tyumen (56,668)	15,608.0	171,032
10	Yalutorovsky Uezd	Yalutorovsk (3,835)	18,944.9	216,792

== Demographics ==
The Tobolsk area long served the Tsars as a place of exile for dissidents and suspects. From its founding in 1796, the Tobolsk Governorate operated as a destination for convicts, including for the Decembrists. Sending exiled Decembrists to Siberia took two years - from 1826 to 1828. Wives, brides, sisters, and mothers of the Decembrists sentenced to hard labor voluntarily followed their men-folk to Siberia. Some of the exiles settled and remained in the Tobolsk area, even after amnesty. Others moved elsewhere. (The Russian Provisional Government moved the household of the deposed and arrested Imperial family to Tobolsk in August 1917, but the Bolsheviks transferred them to Yekaterinburg in April 1918.)

From the 18th to the early-20th centuries in the southern uyezdy (counties) of the Tobolsk province, peasant colonization continued.

The Governorate's population was 831,100 in 1846, 1,433,043 in 1897, and 2,100,000 in 1916.

At the time of the Russian Empire Census of 1897, the Tobolsk Governorate had a population of 1,433,043, of which 87,351 people lived in cities. Of these, 88.6% spoke Russian, 4.0% Siberian Tatar, 2.6% Ukrainian, 1.3% Khanty, 0.5% Kazakh, 0.5% Komi-Zyrian, 0.4% Polish, 0.3% Mansi, 0.3% Nenets, 0.3% Belarusian, 0.2% Latvian, 0.2% Yiddish, 0.1% Estonian, 0.1% Romani, 0.1% Mordvin, 0.1% German and 0.1% Finnish as their native language.

The religious composition of the population in 1897 was dominated by the Orthodox with 89.0%. 5.1% were Old Believers and "devoids of Orthodoxy;" 4.5% were Muslims.

The percentage of literacy was 11.3% (men 17.7%, women 5.0%)

== Economics ==
In the southern and central regions, agriculture played the main role in the economy.

Animal husbandry developed (including deer breeding in the north of the Tobolsk province), and butter-making was common.

In the northern and central regions of the Tobolsk Governorate, hunting, fishing, collecting pine nuts (predominant among inorodtsy), woodworking, etc. were important.

Permanent traffic was opened along the Yekaterinburg–Tura (Tyumen) railway line (1885), as well as the Chelyabinsk–Omsk–Novonikolaevsk stretch (1896) of the Trans-Siberian Railway.
