= Tyumensky Uyezd =

Subdivision of the Tobolsk Governorate of the Russian Empire

Tyumensky Uyezd (Тюменский уезд) was one of the subdivisions of the Tobolsk Governorate of the Russian Empire. It was situated in the southwestern part of the governorate. Its administrative centre was Tyumen.

== Demographics ==
At the time of the Russian Empire Census of 1897, Tyumensky Uyezd had a population of 121,357. Of these, 87.3% spoke Russian, 10.1% Siberian Tatar, 0.9% Ukrainian, 0.4% Polish, 0.3% Bashkir, 0.2% Yiddish, 0.1% Yiddish, 0.1% Komi-Zyrian, 0.1% German, 0.1% Romani and 0.1% Kazakh as their native language.
