= Tarsky Uyezd =

Tarsky Uyezd (Тарский уезд) was one of the subdivisions of the Tobolsk Governorate of the Russian Empire. It was situated in the southeastern part of the governorate. Its administrative centre was Tara.

== Demographics ==
At the time of the Russian Empire Census of 1897, Tarsky Uyezd had a population of 159,655. Of these, 85.7% spoke Russian, 9.0% Siberian Tatar, 2.9% Ukrainian, 0.7% Polish, 0.3% Chuvash, 0.2% Finnish, 0.2% Komi-Zyrian, 0.2% Kazakh, 0.2% Belarusian, 0.2% Romani, 0.1% Estonian, 0.1% Yiddish, 0.1% Latvian and 0.1% German as their native language.
