= Ishimsky Uyezd =

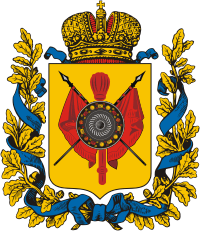
Tobolsk gubernia (Russian empire), coat of arms

Ishimsky Uyezd (Ишимский уезд) was one of the subdivisions of the Tobolsk Governorate of the Russian Empire. It was situated in the southern part of the governorate. Its administrative centre was Ishim.

== Demographics ==
At the time of the Russian Empire Census of 1897, Ishimsky Uyezd had a population of 269,031. Of these, 93.8% spoke Russian, 3.3% Ukrainian, 0.8% Belarusian, 0.6% Siberian Tatar, 0.6% Kazakh, 0.5% Polish, 0.1% Mordvin, 0.1% Romani and 0.1% Yiddish as their native language.
