= Surgutsky Uyezd =

Subdivision of the Tobolsk Governorate of the Russian Empire

Surgutsky Uyezd (Сургутский уезд) was one of the subdivisions of the Tobolsk Governorate of the Russian Empire. It was situated in the northeastern part of the governorate. Its administrative centre was Surgut.

== Demographics ==
At the time of the Russian Empire Census of 1897, Surgutsky Uyezd had a population of 7,747. Of these, 71.7% spoke Khanty, 27.8% Russian, 0.2% Siberian Tatar, 0.1% Polish, 0.1% Ukrainian and 0.1% Nenets as their native language.
