= Ishim, Tyumen Oblast =

Town in Tyumen Oblast, Russia

Ishim Ишим
- Town
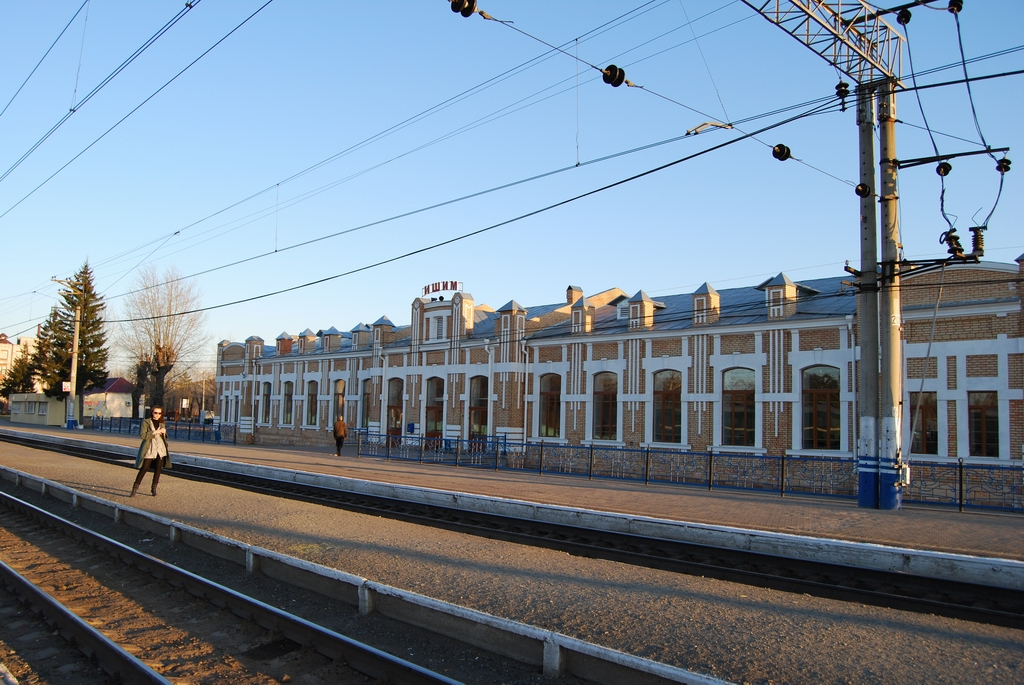
- Ishim railway station

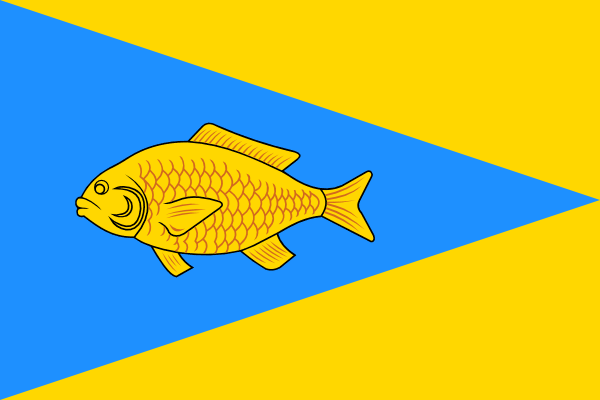
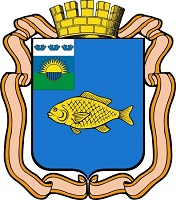
- Flag Coat of arms
- Interactive map of Ishim
- Location of Ishim Ishim (Tyumen Oblast)
- Coordinates: 56°07′N 69°30′E
- Country: Russia
- Federal subject: Tyumen Oblast
- Founded: 1670
- Town status since: 1782

Government
  - Head of Administration: Fedor Shishkin
- Elevation: 80 m (260 ft)

Population (2010 Census)
  - Total: 65,243
  - Estimate (2025): 67,345 (+3.2%)
  - Rank: 241st in 2010

Administrative status
  - Subordinated to: Town of Ishim
  - Capital of: Ishimsky District, Town of Ishim

Municipal status
  - Urban okrug: Ishim Urban Okrug
  - Capital of: Ishim Urban Okrug, Ishimsky Municipal District
- Time zone: UTC+5 (MSK+2)
- Postal code: 627750
- Dialing code: +7 34551
- OKTMO ID: 71705000001
- Town Day: Observed in summer

Ishim (Russian: Иши́м) is a town in the south of Tyumen Oblast, Russia. Population: 65,243 (2010 census); 67,757 (2002 census); 66,373 (1989 Soviet census). It was previously known as Korkina Sloboda (until 1782).

== History ==
It was founded in 1670 as the village of Korkina Sloboda. In 1721, by the order of Tsar Peter the Great the village gained the right to establish Nikolskaya Trade Fair which rapidly became one of the most important trade fairs in Siberia. This trade fair took place twice a year on the Saint Nicholas day (19 December and 22 May) until 1919. In 1782, by the order of Empress Catherine the Great, Korkina Sloboda was renamed Ishim and was granted town status. In 1918, Ishim became the administrative center of Ishimsky Uyezd. In 1921-1922 Ishim was the center of the West Siberian rebellion. In 1984, the city began a sister city relationship with Grand Forks, North Dakota in the United States. This relationship terminated in the late 1990s due to economic turmoil in Ishim. In 2017 Ishim began a sister relationship with Surovikino, Volgograd Oblast in Russia.

== Administrative and municipal status ==
Within the framework of administrative divisions, Ishim serves as the administrative center of Ishimsky District, even though it is not a part of it. As an administrative division, it is incorporated separately as the Town of Ishim—an administrative unit with the status equal to that of the districts. As a municipal division, the Town of Ishim is incorporated as Ishim Urban Okrug.

== Transport ==
Ishim is currently designated the eastern terminus of European route E22, a road route crossing Russia, Latvia, Sweden, Germany, the Netherlands, and the United Kingdom.

== Climate ==
Climate data for Ishim
Month	Jan	Feb	Mar	Apr	May	Jun	Jul	Aug	Sep	Oct	Nov	Dec	Year
Record high °C (°F)	3.9 (39.0)	8.4 (47.1)	14.2 (57.6)	30.6 (87.1)	36.5 (97.7)	37.5 (99.5)	38.7 (101.7)	36.5 (97.7)	32.4 (90.3)	24.8 (76.6)	13.8 (56.8)	4.1 (39.4)	38.7 (101.7)
Mean daily maximum °C (°F)	−12.5 (9.5)	−9.8 (14.4)	−1.7 (28.9)	9.3 (48.7)	18.8 (65.8)	23.3 (73.9)	24.4 (75.9)	22.0 (71.6)	15.6 (60.1)	7.8 (46.0)	−3.5 (25.7)	−10.0 (14.0)	7.0 (44.5)
Daily mean °C (°F)	−16.7 (1.9)	−15.0 (5.0)	−7.0 (19.4)	3.8 (38.8)	12.3 (54.1)	17.4 (63.3)	18.8 (65.8)	16.3 (61.3)	10.2 (50.4)	3.4 (38.1)	−7.0 (19.4)	−14.0 (6.8)	1.9 (35.4)
Mean daily minimum °C (°F)	−21.2 (−6.2)	−20.2 (−4.4)	−12.2 (10.0)	−1.3 (29.7)	6.0 (42.8)	11.4 (52.5)	13.2 (55.8)	11.0 (51.8)	5.4 (41.7)	−0.5 (31.1)	−10.5 (13.1)	−18.3 (−0.9)	−3.1 (26.4)
Record low °C (°F)	−47.3 (−53.1)	−46.3 (−51.3)	−41.1 (−42.0)	−28.9 (−20.0)	−11.8 (10.8)	−2.8 (27.0)	1.4 (34.5)	−3.3 (26.1)	−9.3 (15.3)	−26.7 (−16.1)	−40.3 (−40.5)	−51.1 (−60.0)	−51.1 (−60.0)
Average precipitation mm (inches)	19 (0.7)	14 (0.6)	20 (0.8)	23 (0.9)	37 (1.5)	56 (2.2)	72 (2.8)	58 (2.3)	42 (1.7)	31 (1.2)	29 (1.1)	24 (0.9)	425 (16.7)
Source: www.pogodaiklimat.ru

== Notable people ==
- Pyotr Pavlovich Yershov, writer
- Nikolai Nikitin, engineer
- Nikolay Anikin, Olympic cross country skier
- Boris Shakhlin, a Soviet gymnast, the 1960 Olympic all-around champion and the 1958 all-around World Champion
