= Grigori Rasputin in popular culture =

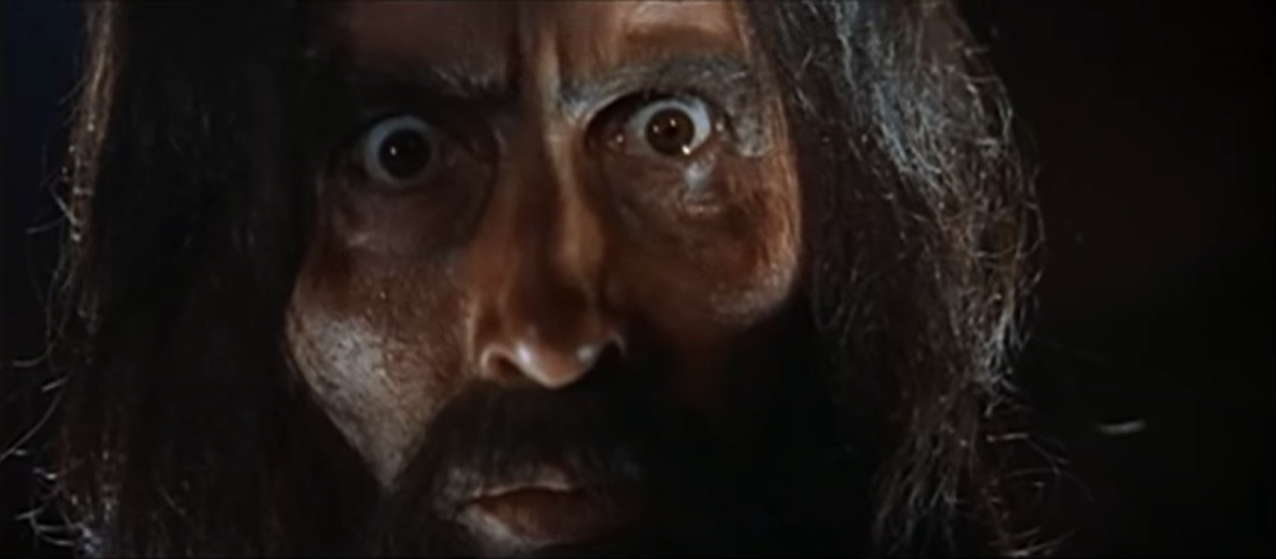
Rasputin as portrayed by Christopher Lee in Rasputin the Mad Monk (1966)

The life of the notorious Russian mystic Grigori Rasputin has been the subject of a variety of media since his death in 1916.

== Films ==
=== Historical fiction ===
Films that aim to be historically accurate:

- Within nine months of Rasputin's murder, two low budget silent films about Rasputin were released in September 1917. Producer-director Herbert Brenon released The Fall of the Romanoffs, while producer William A. Brady released Rasputin, the Black Monk. Rasputin was played by Edward Connelly in the former and Montagu Love in the latter.
- Rasputin, a 1917 silent film released by Worldart Films and directed by Max Neufield. Re-released in 1929 as Rasputin, the Holy Sinner.
- Rasputin, a 1929 silent film with synchronised sound effects. Produced by Momento Film Company and directed by Nikolai Larin. The titular character portrayed by Gregori Chmara.
- Rasputin, The Holy Sinner, a 1928 German film produced and directed by Martin Berger; Rasputin was played by Nikolai Malikoff.
- Rasputin, Dämon der Frauen, a 1932 German film; Rasputin was played by Conrad Veidt.
- Rasputin and the Empress, 1932 MGM production directed by Richard Boleslawski; Rasputin was played by Lionel Barrymore.
- La Tragédie impériale, a 1938 film directed by Marcel L'Herbier and based on the book by Alfred Neumann. Rasputin was played by Harry Baur.
- Raspoutine, a 1953 French film directed by Georges Combret; never released in the United States or England. Rasputin was played by Pierre Brasseur.
- The Night They Killed Rasputin, a 1960 film; Rasputin was played by Edmund Purdom.
- J'ai tué Raspoutine, a 1967 film directed by Robert Hossein, featuring an interview with the real Prince Felix Yussupov; Rasputin was played by Gert Fröbe.
- Nicholas and Alexandra, a 1971 epic British film directed by Franklin J. Schaffner; Rasputin was played by Tom Baker, who was nominated for two Golden Globes.
- Agony, finished in 1975 by filmmaker Elem Klimov. The road to screening took him nine years and many rewrites. The final edit was not released in the USSR until 1985, censored partly because of its orgy scenes and partly its sympathetic portrait of Tsar Nicholas II.
- Rasputin: Dark Servant of Destiny, a 1996 HBO TV film; Rasputin was played by Alan Rickman, who won a Golden Globe and an Emmy for his portrayal.
- Rasputin, a 2011 Italian film; Rasputin was played by Francesco Cabras.
- Raspoutine, a 2011 French-Russian TV film directed by Josée Dayan; Rasputin was played by Gérard Depardieu, who has said that it had long been his dream to play the character

=== Fantastical fiction ===
Films that portray Rasputin with magic powers or in an obviously fictional manner:

- Rasputin the Mad Monk, a 1966 Hammer film; Rasputin was played by Christopher Lee and is portrayed as a literal monk expelled from his monastery.
- Rasputin is the primary antagonist of the 1997 animated film Anastasia. He is portrayed as a sorcerer who sold his soul for dark powers. After drowning in the Neva River, he returned to life in order to complete a curse he placed on the Romanovs by killing the last of the royal family, Anastasia. He is accompanied by an albino bat named Bartok. Rasputin is voiced by Christopher Lloyd, while Jim Cummings performs his singing voice.
- Rasputin, played by Karel Roden, is the main antagonist of the 2004 film Hellboy, based on the comics series of the same name (see Comics, below). After his assassination in 1916, he became an servant of the Ogdru Jahad, an eldritch embodiment of chaos and evil, and repeatedly returns to life to free his imprisoned master. He is the one who summons Hellboy during World War II.
  - Another version of Rasputin appears in the 2019 Hellboy reboot. Again, he is a magician responsible for summoning Hellboy to Earth.
- Rasputin's legacy is a major plot element in the 1999 anime film Case Closed: The Last Wizard of the Century.
- The King's Man, a 2021 Matthew Vaughn film, features Rasputin as a secondary antagonist, played by Welsh actor Rhys Ifans. He is an agent for an international conspiracy to keep Britain, Germany, and Russia at war.

=== Characters based on Rasputin ===
- The 1972 British-Spanish film Horror Express (Spanish: Pánico en el Transiberiano, lit. "Panic on the Trans-Siberian"), directed by Eugenio Martín and starring Christopher Lee, Peter Cushing and Telly Savalas, with Argentine actor Alberto de Mendoza also starring as a version of Rasputin named Father Pujardov, a mystical monk who travels on train as the adviser of a Russian Tsar (who is based on Nicholas II).
- The 1980 Australian film Harlequin rehashes Rasputin's story in a contemporary setting; Robert Powell played the Rasputin character, a mysterious faith healer called Gregory Wolfe. The characters corresponding to Nicholas II and Alexandra Fyodorovna were called Nick and Sandra Rast ('Rast' being 'Tsar' backwards).
- The Russian villain of the stop-motion animated series The New Adventures of Pinocchio was named after Rasputin and bears a similar appearance.

== Television ==
=== Historical fiction ===
- "The Death of Rasputin", an episode of the CBS series You Are There, airing 2 May 1954; Rasputin is portrayed by Rod Steiger.
- Fall of Eagles, a 1974 BBC miniseries; Rasputin was played by Michael Aldridge
- Grigoriy R. (Григорий Р.) is a Russian biographical 2014 TV miniseries which chronicles the life of Grigori Rasputin until his death. Rasputin is portrayed by Vladimir Mashkov.
- In the 2019 Netflix mini-series The Last Czars, Rasputin is portrayed by Ben Cartwright.

=== Science fiction and fantasy ===
- In Season 3, Episode 12 ("Strings") of the Canadian vampire drama Forever Knight, Nick has a flashback which reveals his friendship with Emperor Nicholas II. Rasputin is shown to have significant influence over Empress Alexandra, because she believes he can cure her son Alexei. It is implied that Alexei is actually suffering from vampirism, and Rasputin himself is shown to be a newly turned vampire created by LaCroix. LaCroix turns him to enjoy the irony of a demonized holy man, (thus implying that Rasputin was actually a sage), and to control the Russian empire by controlling Rasputin (who is bound to him through the sire bond). However, Rasputin resists LaCroix's control so LaCroix has him shot and thrown into a river, even though it will not kill Rasputin, in order to ignite a "revolution". Rasputin comes back and tries to kill the emperor in order to gain control of Russia, but Nick stakes him, thus killing him permanently.
- In a 2001 episode on the daytime drama Passions, the witch Tabitha Lenox has a flashback to 1916 Imperial Russia where Rasputin is established as her love interest. Tabitha gives Rasputin advice of how to bring down the imperial family, and also gives him the idea to spare one certain member to which he agrees.
- Rasputin was referred to in the Buffy the Vampire Slayer novel Spike and Dru: Pretty Maids All in a Row, implying that Rasputin was a demon with mind-controlling powers which resided on his eyes. A 5th-season episode of the show also has a scene where Buffy debates with a history professor over whether Rasputin had genuinely been killed. A fifth season episode of Angel featured a vampire named Nostroyev who claimed to have been Rasputin's lover.
- In The Crow: Stairway to Heaven episode "Never Say Die", Rasputin's spirit is summoned, leading to a conflict with the show's protagonist, Eric Draven.
- In season 4, episode 6 ("And the Grave of Time") of the TNT show The Librarians, Col. Baird and Nicole Noone chase down a gang of grave robbers led by an immortal Grigori Rasputin.
- In season 5, episode 1 of DC's Legends of Tomorrow, Rasputin (Michael Eklund) is revealed to be one of the villainous historical figures resurrected by the demon Astra. He is depicted as having magical powers, as well as immortality as a result of his resurrection. His plans to assassinate the royal family is thwarted when Atom shrinks down, flies into his stomach, and re-enlarges, blowing apart his body and preventing it from reforming.
- In the 2022 Doctor Who special "The Power of the Doctor", Sacha Dhawan portrays The Master as having become Grigori Rasputin in 1916 Russia, where he allies with his CyberMasters and the Daleks.

=== Comedy ===
- An episode of Saturday Night Live had a sketch titled "The Death of Rasputin," in which he is portrayed by John Belushi.
- In the cartoon The Grim Adventures of Billy & Mandy, he appears with Attila the Hun and Abraham Lincoln to give Mandy advice after she summons spirits from Grim's skull. He is shown with a sword through his head, although no accounts of Rasputin's death involve a sword.
- Rasputin appears in the Animaniacs episode "Nothing But The Tooth", voiced by John Glover.
- In season 5, episode 2 ("Dangerous Minds") of the Comedy Central show Drunk History, Jerry O'Connell portrays Rasputin. Chris Romano comically narrates the life and assassination of Rasputin.
- In History of the World, Part II, Johnny Knoxville plays Rasputin in a series of sketches called Jackrasp, a parody of the Jackass franchise in which Knoxville stars. Fellow Jackass performers Preston Lacy, Chris Pontius, and Jason Acuña perform Jackass-style stunts to assassinate Rasputin.

=== Other references ===
- In season 3, episode 11 ("Pine Barrens") of The Sopranos, Paulie Walnuts compares a Russian mob figure to Rasputin after he evades them in the Pine Barrens, despite apparently being shot in the head.
- In the second season of G.I. Joe A Real American Hero, Cobra grows tired of failures and losses caused by Cobra Commander and genetically engineers a new leader--Serpentor—using the DNA of various warlords, generals, and despicable historical figures. One of Serpentor's "ancestors" was said to have been Grigori Rasputin. This is mentioned in "My Favorite Things" (season 2, episode 19), where the story involves Serpentor gaining additional powers from his proximity to artifacts once owned by his "ancestors", such as a portrait of Rasputin dating back to his time with Tsar Nicholas II. Serpentor was voiced by Richard Gautier.
- In the Red Dwarf episode "Meltdown", Rasputin is one of the rogue wax droids. The Abraham Lincoln wax droid mistakenly refers to him as "Rice-puddin'" due to his accent, describing Rasputin as "the most hated, loathed, and despised man of his era".
- In the Smallville episode "Run", Lex purchases a manuscript that was said to be the only thing that was hanging in Rasputin's chamber while he was studying at the Grigori monastery. He believed it would lead him to unimaginable power. Legend has it in the show's universe that Rasputin would stare at it for days at a time hoping to penetrate its secrets. The border designs of the manuscript say, in Kryptonian, "look deeper", and when Clark uses his X-ray vision, he sees that there is a map which leads to one of the three stones of power, which he later acquires and uses to assemble the Fortress of Solitude.
- In an episode of M*A*S*H, Trapper mentions to Radar that "Rasputin" (Hawkeye) "swallowed a whole drug store," and didn't fall asleep (as Trapper was trying to sedate Hawkeye).
- In the Seinfeld episode "The Suicide", Jerry asks Elaine if naming a child "Rasputin" would have a negative effect on the child. At the end of the episode, George mentions that he helped a fortune teller deliver her child, and when Jerry asks what name was given to the baby, he replied, "You won't believe it...Rasputin."
- In the Hanna-Barbera cartoon Top Cat and the Beverly Hills Cats, the antagonist's canine companion is called Rasputin.
- In the 2011 Doctor Who episode "Let's Kill Hitler", one of the Teselecta crew—who travel through time to punish those who did not suffer for their crimes when alive—says that in their previous assignment they copied Rasputin but got the skin tone green.
- Warehouse 13 featured his prayer rope, used to conjure images of the dead. Apparently after being successfully assassinated the first time, his followers used it to make it seem like he had cheated death.
- In season 3, episode 9 ("Red Menace") of Grimm, Nick's journals talk about Rasputin and claim that he is a Koschei, a Wesen with the power to both heal and harm, depending on the situation. The episode features another Koschei, who is depicted as having glowing green eyes.
- In season 2, episode 1 of The Chilling Adventures of Sabrina, Rasputin is referred to as a "Father Gregory Rasputin" who was murdered by poisoning, beating, shooting, drowning, and destroying the unholy reliquary which contained his mummified heart. This insinuates that Rasputin was a warlock and a high priest of a coven of witches who worship the Dark Lord Satan.

== Theater ==
- Rasputin's End (1958) is an opera in three acts; (libretto by Stephen Spender, music by Nicolas Nabokov).
- Rasputin was portrayed on stage in the play Rivers of Blood, written by the American playwright Jay Jeff Jones. This was presented in a workshop production in New York City in 1982 and received a full production at The Eaton in London in 1983. It was directed by the Irish novelist and poet Dermot Healy and Rasputin was played by Gabriel Connaughton.
- Comedian Richard Herring played Rasputin in his self-penned 1993 Edinburgh show Ra-Ra Rasputin which told the story of the Mad Monk, set to the music of Boney M, which also drew parallels between the British Royal Family and the doomed Romanovs. Richard appeared on Celebrity Mastermind on 27 December 2010, his specialist subject was Rasputin. In 2014 his play "I Killed Rasputin" premiered at the Edinburgh fringe.
- Beardo, a musical loosely based on the life of Rasputin, with book and lyrics by Jason Craig and music by Dave Malloy, was commissioned by the Berkeley, CA based Shotgun Players, to begin their 20th anniversary season in March 2011.
- Rasputin's Mother (2012), by British playwright Michael Davies, won what is now the Bristol Old Vic playwriting competition and was produced and performed in 2013 at the Ilkley Playhouse, Birmingham Old Joint Stock and Leeds Seven Arts theatres.
- Rasputin, an opera, was written by Jay Reise on his own libretto on request of New York City Opera and was devoted to Beverly Sills. The world premiere took place on 17 September 1988.
- Rasputin is an opera by Finnish composer Einojuhani Rautavaara, who wrote both the libretto and the music.
- The 2014 rock opera Rasputin – Miracles Lie in the Eye of the Beholder was developed by Michael Rapp, and starred Ted Neeley.

== Comics ==
- Rasputin is a recurrent villain in early collections of the ongoing comic book series Hellboy, in which he appears as the title character's archenemy and as the one who is responsible (in cooperation with a Nazi occult/scientific program) for summoning Hellboy to Earth during World War II and later for "cracking the prison" of the universe's embodiment of evil and chaos, the Ogdru Jahad, to whose worship he has converted after his failed assassination in 1916. Rasputin is destroyed by Hellboy at the end of their first meeting, but his spirit survives to catalyze several subsequent plots due to his having given part of his soul to the Baba Yaga as a boy, in the folkloric manner of Koschei the Deathless. His spirit dwindles over successive encounters, ceding chief villain status in the series to the goddess Hecate, the witch Nimue, and eventually the Ogdru Jahad itself/themselves.Rasputin returns in the BRPD in the last two arcs as the vessel for the Ogdru Jahad.
- Fantagraphics also released a comic book in 2006, Hotwire Comix & Capers, which features a six-page story about Rasputin by cartoonist M. Wartella.
- Rasputin makes a brief unnamed appearance as a vampire in the second volume and reappears named and redesigned in the twelfth volume of the French comic Requiem Chevalier Vampire.
- a character called Rasputin (with little similar to the actual Rasputin except for some personality traits and his physical appearance) is also depicted in Hugo Pratt's comic book series Corto Maltese as a sea-pirate during World War I.
- An X-Men miniseries revealed the superhero Colossus to be a descendant of Rasputin, who had worked with future X-Men foe Mister Sinister during Rasputin's lifetime to develop a means of bringing Rasputin back to life in the body of his last living descendant. This plan was defeated when Colossus's brother Mikhail willingly exiled himself to another dimension where he could never return and would never die, meaning that, even if Colossus died without any children, Rasputin would be stuck in Mikhail's body in a barren universe.
- A Dilbert comic strip, published 13 August 2000, features a Rasputin as a "Consultant", as a stand-alone joke. The character is likely heavily inspired by the real life Rasputin, including similar features and mystical powers. In the end of the comic, he was apparently killed by Wally due to the latter's "anti-charisma".
- In a bonus story in the first book of Atomic Robo, the ghost of Rasputin is sent by Thomas Edison to kill the titular Atomic Robo.
- In DC Comics' Firestorm, Mikhail Arkadin meets a psychic named Rasputin. He asks if the man is named after "the mad monk of legend"; the man responds "Perhaps. Or perhaps I am the mad monk of legend."
- In Kid Eternity #15, Master Man (Quality Comics) summons up Rasputin from Stygia (Hell) to help engineer a jail break, which he does by hypnotizing a guard.
- In Assassin's Creed: The Fall Rasputin's grave is exhumed by the assassin Nikolai Orelov to retrieve the shard from the Staff of Eden.
- In 2011, Oni Press published a graphic novel titled Petrograd. Set during the height of World War I, the story follows a reluctant British spy named Cleary stationed in the heart of the Russian empire who is handed the most difficult assignment of his career: to orchestrate the death of Rasputin.
- In 2014, Image Comics launched a new ongoing comic series titled Rasputin, in which a fictionalized version of the titular character recounts his life from his birth to his murder. The series includes elements of fantasy, as Rasputin appears to wield various supernatural powers, mostly related to necromancy.

== Manga and anime ==
- Rasputin appears in Detective Conan: The Last Wizard of the Century as the ancestor of Seiran Hoshi a.k.a. "Scorpion", who shoots her victims in the right eye to avenge him.
- Rasputin is a primary antagonist in the anime Master of Mosquiton. In the series, he is an immortal alien who has been on Earth since the dawn of humanity, and the name Rasputin is simply the latest of his many aliases.
- Rasputin appears in the manga Steel Angel Kurumi as one of three mystics who helps set up a barrier for a Steel Fight.
- Rasputin is a primary antagonist in the anime Raimuiro Senkitan.
- Rasputin makes a small cameo in the Soul Eater manga and anime, where he briefly fights the living scythe Soul Eater and Soul's wielder and partner, Maka.
- Rasputin is an antagonist in the Blood+ manga and anime, where he serves Diva as the second of her Chevaliers.
- Rasputin is an antagonist in the manga Drifters as well as its anime adaptation (voiced by Masahiko Tanaka), where he, together with the Grand Duchess Anastasia Nikolaevna of Russia, serves the Black King as an Ends.
- Rasputin makes a cameo in the Beyblade series where it is revealed he created the Sacred Beast for the Beyblade Black Dranzer.
- A descendant of Rasputin named Rasputon appears as the antagonist in the Lupin III television special episode "From Russia With Love".
- In Record of Ragnarok, Rasputin is listed as one of the 13 warriors representing humanity in the tournament against the gods.

== Books ==
- Rasputin appears as a comical antagonist in the 1978 alternate history science fiction novel And Having Writ... by Donald R. Bensen. He first appears in the novel after Nicholas II calls for him after his son Alexei Nikolaevich falls and strikes his head on a desk. Rasputin enters the room, chants over the suffering child, and then leaves. The alien visitors Raf, Ari, Valmis and Dark are soon told about Alexi's Haemophilia by Nicholas. They cure Alexi within three days after they are able to reproduce a necessary protein it using machinery and injected the new blood into the czarevitch. With Alexi cured, Nicholas II no longer has any use for Rasputin and he is thrown out of the Royal palace by Imperial soldiers. He eventually makes his way to New York City and later becomes successful in the advertising and film industries.
- In the 1999 book Our Dumb Century produced by The Onion, one of the articles for the 16 March 1923 edition is "Russians Continuing to Kill Rasputin", in which Rasputin not only is poisoned, shot, stabbed, and drowned, but is also run over by a freight train, shot from a cannon, set on fire, and decapitated twice (among many other things), yet still refuses to die.
- In the 1999 Doctor Who Past Doctor Adventures novel The Wages of Sin, the Third Doctor and his companions Jo Grant and Liz Shaw meet Rasputin prior to his death and learn that he is actually a more pleasant individual than history records — since all evidence of his villainy was written by his enemies — but the Doctor is nevertheless forced to allow Rasputin to die, in order to preserve history.
- In the 2003 novel The Romanov Prophecy by Steve Berry, Rasputin is depicted as a mysterious and prophetic figure who predicts his own demise, as well as that of the Russian Empire, but then a return of the Romanovs to power. The first two of those prophecies are based on an actual letter that the historical Rasputin wrote.
- In Mikheil Javakhishvili's novel Kvachi, the eponymous character befriends Rasputin through a ruse. Kvachi exploits his connection to him to gain favor with the tsar. After recognizing that the political tide is turning towards to Bolsheviks, however, Kvachi and his associates assassinate him in exactly the same way as is historically described.
- In the 2013 book The Blood Gospel, the first novel in the Order of the Sanguines series by James Rollins, Grigori Rasputin is portrayed as an exiled Russian vampire who reigns over a religious cult he created, and is one of the main antagonists of the series.
- The 2016 crypto-thriller The Apocalypse Fire by Dominic Selwood features cryptographs contained in personal notebooks belonging to Rasputin.
- Jeremy Robinson’s 2016 novel Empire portrays Rasputin as Vladimir, president of Russia. He met Alexander Diotrephes, the mythical Hercules, and obtained his elixir for immortality centuries prior. He is also responsible for the resurrection of Julie Sigler, sister of Jack Sigler, callsign: King, and brainwashing her into serving him. The book’s epilogue shows King infiltrating Valdimir’s private quarters and learning his true identity before stripping him of his immortality. Rasputin is rumored to return in the sequel novel, Kingdom.
- Charlaine Harris' alternate history/fantasy series Gunnie Rose (2018-ongoing) is set in a world where Rasputin, who was not assassinated in 1916, helped evacuate the Romanovs to California. The central character, a female gunslinger in Texas, is descended from Rasputin and has inherited his paranormal powers.
- John Boyne's novel The House of Special Purpose depicts a Russian village boy who, by saving Grand Duke Nicholas Nikolaevich from assassination, is granted a position in the household of Nicholas II as a companion to the tsar's son, Alexei. As a member of the royal entourage, Rasputin is featured in events both fictional and factual, leading up to his death.

== Music ==
=== Musicians ===
The rock musician Jon Symon performed mainly in the 1970s under his stage name Rasputin.

=== Bands ===
The cello rock band Rasputina, formed in 1992, derive their name from Rasputin; the lead singer Melora Creager was "into [him] at the time".

=== Songs ===
- "Rasputin" was a hit song by the disco band Boney M. The song loosely describes Rasputin and some of the events of his life, emphasizing and exaggerating his sexual liaisons. Bobby Farrell had dressed up as Rasputin in some band performances of the song. Coincidentally, Farrell died on 30 December 2010, the anniversary of Rasputin's death, in Saint Petersburg, the same city in which Rasputin was killed. In 2007, Finnish folk metal band Turisas released a cover of the song.
- The American progressive metal band Mastodon released a concept album in 2009 entitled Crack the Skye. It features a track called 'The Czar' which is about Rasputin.
- "Let Rasputin Do It" is a song on the Swedish rock band Fireside's 1998 album Uomini d'Onore.
- Rasputin is the subject of the song "The Khlysti Evangelist" on the Therion album Sirius B.
- The Austin Lounge Lizards depicted Rasputin's encounters with the American medical system in their song "Rasputin's HMO"; this portrayed Rasputin as being unable to obtain medical treatment from his HMO despite having been poisoned, burned, exploded, shot, and thrown in a river.
- The Brazilian/American thrash metal band Cavalera Conspiracy wrote a song entitled "Rasputin" on their second album Blunt Force Trauma.
- The Indigo Girls' 1989 song "Closer to Fine" includes the lyrics "I went to see the doctor of philosophy/With a poster of Rasputin and a beard down to his knee".
- Radio Tapok recently released a song named "Rasputin", narrating his death and the events which led to it.

=== Album covers ===
- Rasputin is on the album cover of Electronic's third album, Twisted Tenderness (1999).
- A rendering of Rasputin's face is visible on the single Thirty-Three by The Smashing Pumpkins.
- Rasputin is depicted on the cover of Type O Negative's 2007 album, Dead Again.
- The cover of the Raskol EP by polish band Batushka, released on 2020, shows Rasputin being struck by seven blades, resembling the Seven Pains of the Holy Mary.

=== Other ===
- Rasputin Music is an independent chain of music stores located in and around the San Francisco Bay Area. The first store, founded in Berkeley, California in 1971, was named after the Russian monk, and the chain today uses pictures of Rasputin in their store decorations and marketing/promotional materials.
- The second-season finale of the YouTube series Epic Rap Battles of History features Rasputin (portrayed by Nice Peter) and Joseph Stalin (portrayed by Epic Lloyd).

== Computer and video games ==
=== Games named after Rasputin ===
Rasputin was a platform game released by Firebird for the Commodore 64, ZX Spectrum and Amstrad CPC in 1985. The player takes the role of a knight tasked with preventing The Spirit of Rasputin from destroying the universe by destroying the source of his power, the Jewel of Seven Stars.

=== Rasputin as a character ===
- Grigoria Rasputin plays a major role in the game Shadow Hearts: Covenant. In the game, he is a genuine mystic with dark powers, and he is head of a secret group which is plotting the overthrow of the Czar.
- Rasputin appears as a primary antagonist in Shin Megami Tensei: Devil Summoner: Raidou Kuzunoha vs. The Soulless Army. He survived his historical death and is later revealed as an android and Dark Summoner from the distant future who time travelled to the game's alternate history of Taisho 20.
- Rasputin appears as a Servant in Fate/Grand Order, possessing the body of Kirei Kotomine, in an antagonistic role during the second arc of the game.
- Rasputin appears as an antagonist during the Third Arc storyline in Wizard101 who first appears in Polaris, a world based on Russia in the time where Rasputin was alive. During Polaris, he acts as an adviser to the Empress.
- Rasputin plays antagonistic roles in the 2016 board game Scythe and the 2020 real-time strategy game Iron Harvest, which share their "1920+" setting. In both, he heads the antagonistic, secretive Fenris faction, but in the latter he also serves as an advisor to Tsar Nicholas in Rusviet as a loose parallel to his role in history.
- Rasputin appears as a major character in the 2024 game The Thaumaturge.

=== Characters based on Rasputin ===
- The main character in the PS2/Xbox game Psychonauts is called Razputin (better known as 'Raz'). Raz's backstory includes a fear of drowning (like Rasputin's siblings) and a life in the circus (like his daughter Maria).
- In Command & Conquer: Red Alert 2, the character Yuri was most likely inspired by Rasputin; he is a mysterious man with special powers who has a hold on the Russian leader.
- In the Adult Swim cartoon Metalocalypse, the character of Vater Orlaag bears a physical resemblance to Rasputin, and is a spiritual advisor, much like Rasputin was to Tsar Nicholas II in real life
- In the game Resident Evil 4 and its remake, the village chief Bitorez Mendez bears a striking resemblance to Rasputin. Also, as Rasputin cared for the peasantry, Chief Mendez is the only possessor of a dominant Plagas that shows any care for the ganados as revealed by a note encountered shortly before the boss battle with him. Mendez' voice actor, Jesse Corti, even voiced him in a similar manner to Rasputin from the Hellboy film. His bio in supplementary materials also reveal he was formerly a Christian priest before the Los Illuminados arrived, just like how Rasputin was a monk.
- In the game Dishonored there is a character Anton Sokolov, chief inventor of the empire, based on Rasputin's image.
- In the game Destiny and its sequel, Rasputin is an artificial intelligence built to defend Old Earth. Rasputin occasionally speaks in Russian, quoting 19th century literature.
- A character named Rasputin can be found as a playable character in the World Heroes series of arcade fighting games by Alpha Denshi and SNK, being the leader of a pansexual love cult based in Russia. He has the ability to create fire, ice, and lightning projectiles, and his super attack heavily implies him sexually assaulting his foe.

=== Theme parks ===
One of the 11 portraits (Sinister Eleven), a Marc Davis concept which appears in Walt Disney's Haunted Mansion dark ride in the Magic Kingdom at Walt Disney World (Florida) and Tokyo Disneyland, is dedicated to Grigori Rasputin.

=== Other ===
- In White Wolf Game Studio's World of Darkness role-playing game metaverse, many factions of supernaturals claim Rasputin as one of their own, including one faction of mages (the Cult of Ecstasy), at least five factions of vampires (the Brujah, Malkavians, Nosferatu, Ventrue, and Followers of Set), and one faction of werewolves (the Shadow Lords). The second edition of Wraith: The Oblivion has a description of the 'Stamina' attribute referring to the stories of Rasputin's assassination. The in-game "truth" is still disputed, though Ethan Skemp (developer of Werewolf) has since mentioned that the multiple conflicting stories were meant as little more than an in-joke running through many of White Wolf's early books.
- In Team Fortress 2, there is an achievement for the Heavy class named after Rasputin, given for being shot, burned, bludgeoned and exploded in a single life. This is a reference to Rasputin's alleged survival of being poisoned, being shot several times, and being badly beaten before finally being shot in the head and being dropped into the Malaya Nevka River.
- In Assassin's Creed II, a series of glyphs and codices describe Rasputin as a Templar agent who infiltrates the Czar's palace so he can steal a powerful artifact in the Czar's possession.
- In Wolfenstein: Youngblood, there is an achievement where the player must be knocked down to near death and revived 20 times. The achievement is called Rasputin and the icon features a picture of Rasputin.

== Other media ==
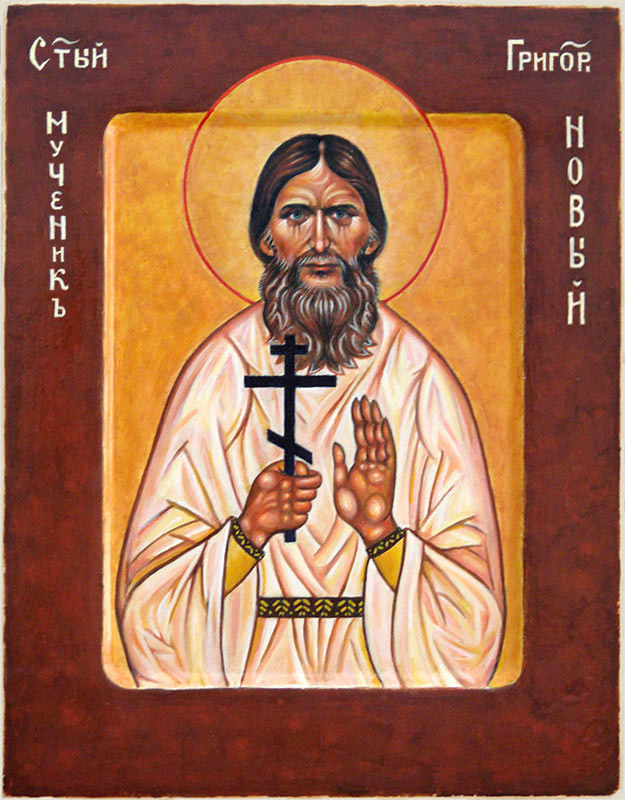
Icon of Grigori Rasputin

- Todd McFarlane's toy company, McFarlane Toys, made a Rasputin action figure.
- Skaters Natalia Bestemianova and Andrei Bukin performed an ice dance program titled Rasputin in which Bukin portrayed Rasputin.
- In the collaborative alternate history project Ill Bethisad (which began in 1997), Rasputin was never killed, and lives until the mid-20th century; he is canonized as an Orthodox saint in 1979.
- North Coast Brewing Company's Old Rasputin Imperial stout bears his name. According to its website, the stout is brewed in the tradition of 18th-century English brewers that supplied the court of Catherine the Great.
- Rasputin and The Mad Monk appear as playable collectable figures in the HorrorClix game produced by WizKids Games.
- One Pathfinder Adventure Path from Paizo Publishing features Rasputin (two years after his own death) as the son of Baba Yaga and a major villain for the player characters to thwart.
- Irish professional wrestler John Howard (1943-2013) aka Sean Doyle, was billed as Rasputin while wrestling in the UK in the 1980s and 1990s. Howard, as Rasputin, wrestled in bouts televised on ITV's World of Sport and subsequent stand-alone Wrestling show as well as S4C's Reslo programme.
