= John Bereslavsky =

Russian religious leader (born 1946)

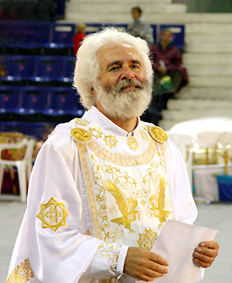
- Born: Veniamin Yakovlevich; 1946 (age 79–80)
- Organization(s): Bogorodichnij Centr, Association for the Study of Cathar Culture

John Bereslavsky (Russian: Иоанн Береславский, romanized: Ioann Bereslavskij), born Veniamin Yakovlevich Bereslavsky (Russian: Вениамин Яковлевич Береславский), is a Russian founder of new spirituality movements, described by his followers as a prophet. He is also known as Juan de San Grial and John Bogomil.

== Early life ==
Bereslavsky was born in Moscow in 1946. He graduated from the Ippolitov-Ivanov Academy in 1966, and earned a Foreign Languages degree from Maurice Thorez Foreign Language Institute in 1970. He began to investigate Eastern Orthodox Christianity in the mid-1970s, being baptised into the Russian Orthodox Church in 1980, in spite of the anti-religious policy of the Soviet state. Having considered becoming a Russian Orthodox Church priest, Bereslavsky says that he abandoned this career path when it became clear that he would be required to inform on congregation members to the secret police.

Bereslavsky claims to have received a revelation from the Mother of God in November 1984. In October 1985, Bereslavsky was ordained to the priesthood of the True Orthodox Church and adopted the name John, after either John the Baptist or John the Divine.

== Orthodox Church of the Sovereign Mother of God ==
In response to the greater religious freedom brought about by perestroika, Bereslavsky founded an organisation in Moscow called the Bogorodichnij Centr (Centre of the Mother of God), firstly as a trade union in 1989, then as a philanthropic, educational and publishing organisation in April 1991. In 1997, Bereslavsky’s church officially took the name ‘‘The Orthodox Church of the Sovereign Mother of God’’ (OCSMG), identifying itself with the famous ‘‘Sovereign’’ icon miraculously discovered on the very day of Nicholas II’s abdication. He is known as Archbishop Ioann in the religious movement. Bereslavsky wrote dozens of books.

There are authors who have a negative view of the new religious movement. Ekaterina Elbakyan, who has a doctorate in Philosophy and is a specialist in the field of religious studies, does not.

Bereslavsky opposes the teachings of Joseph Volotsky (which he terms "Josephism"), believing that these teachings have corrupted Russian Orthodoxy with legalism and hypocrisy, and views his movement as having revived the position of Nilus of Sora. He views members of the True Orthodox Church who died in Soviet prison camps as martyrs, and has spoken of Solovki prison camp as the "Golgotha of Solovki".

In December 2006, OCSMG members who had organised an exhibit, titled Solovki—The Second Golgotha, were arrested by federal agents, having been accused of causing psychological harm to a group of students by their teacher, a member of United Russia. These charges were never proven; however, the Russian state began revoking registrations from the OCSMG's local congregations, prompting Bereslavsky to begin to spend more time outside of Russia.

The OCSMG also venerates Grigori Rasputin.

== Association for the Study of Cathar Culture ==
In 2009, Bereslavsky resigned from his administrative position as the head of the OCSMG's council of bishops and relocated to Spain. Claiming a revelation from the medieval Cathar Perfects (who he claimed had ascended to heaven like Elijah), Bereslavsky adopted the Gnostic view of the god of the Old Testament as a vengeful demiurge (equated with Elohim, Jehovah and Yaltabaoth) whom he calls the "Chastiser", distinct from the Father revealed by Jesus.

Bereslavsky founded an association named the Association for the Study of Cathar Culture (Spanish: Asociación para el estudio de la cultura cátara). In that organisation he is known as John Bogomil (Serbo-Croatian: Ivan Bogumil) or John of the Holy Grail (Spanish: Juan de San Grial). This group has religious features such as the validation of its doctrine being based on a supposed revelation of the divinity. Bereslavsky's followers claim that he has "restored the green laurel of the Cathar Church back to life"—a reference to an Occitan tradition claiming that "after seven hundred years, the laurel will grow green again", meaning that Catharism would be restored seven centuries after it was eliminated.
