= Maria Rasputin =

Daughter of Grigori Rasputin (1898–1977)

Maria Rasputina
- Матрёна Распутина
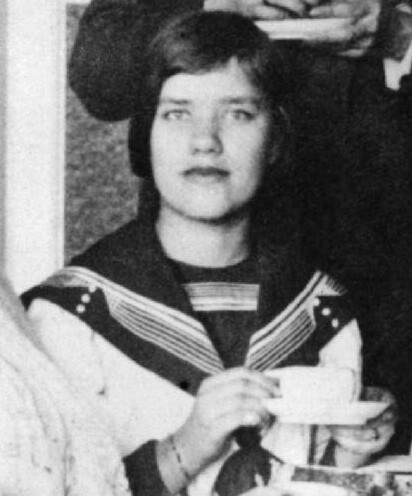
- Maria in 1911
- Born: Matryona Grigorievna Rasputina; March 27, 1898; Pokrovskoye, Russian Empire
- Died: September 27, 1977 (aged 79); Los Angeles, California, U.S.
- Other names: Mara, Matrena, Marochka, Maria Rasputina
- Occupations: Writer, cabaret dancer, circus performer, riveter
- Spouses: Boris Soloviev (m. 1917; died 1926) Gregory Bernadsky (m. 1940; div. 1946)
- Children: Tatyana Soloviev, Maria Soloviev
- Parents: Grigori Rasputin (father); Praskovya Fedorovna Dubrovina (mother)

Maria Rasputina (born Matryona Grigorievna Rasputina, Russian: Матрёна Григорьевна Распутина; 27 March 1898 – 27 September 1977) was the daughter of Grigori Rasputin and his wife Praskovya Fyodorovna Dubrovina. She wrote three memoirs about her father, dealing with Tsar Nicholas II and Tsaritsa Alexandra Feodorovna, the attack by Khionia Guseva, and his 1916 murder. The third one, The Man Behind the Myth, was published in 1977 in association with Patte Barham. In her three memoirs, the veracity of which has been questioned, she painted an almost saintly picture of her father, insisting that most of the negative stories were based on slander and the misinterpretation of facts by his enemies.

== Early life ==
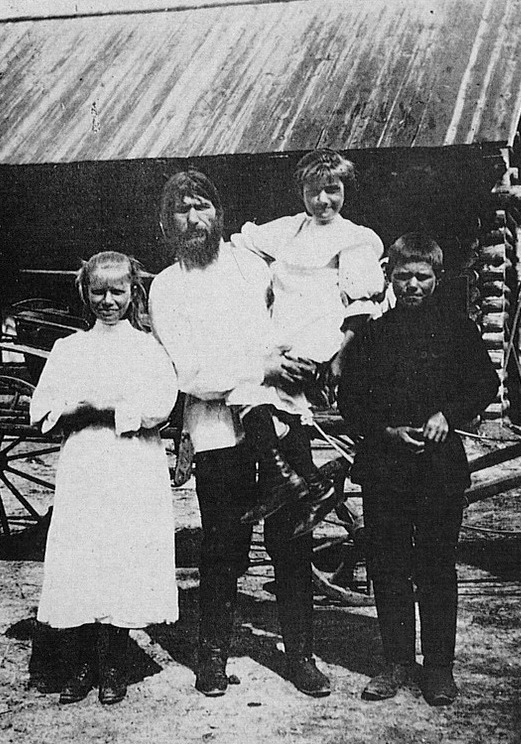
Rasputin with his children

Matryona (or Maria) Rasputin was born in the Siberian village of Pokrovskoye, Tobolsk Governorate on 26 March 1898 and baptized the next day. Some sources say she was born in 1899 — that year is also on her tombstone — but since 1990 the archives in Russia opened up, more information became available for researchers. In September 1910, she went to Kazan (perhaps the Mariinsky women's gymnasium) and then came to St. Petersburg, where her first name was changed to Maria to better fit with her social aspirations. Rasputin had brought Maria and her younger sister Varvara (Barbara) to live with him in the capital with the hope of turning them into "little ladies." After being refused at the Smolny Institute, they attended Steblin-Kamensky private preparatory school in October 1913.

== Father ==
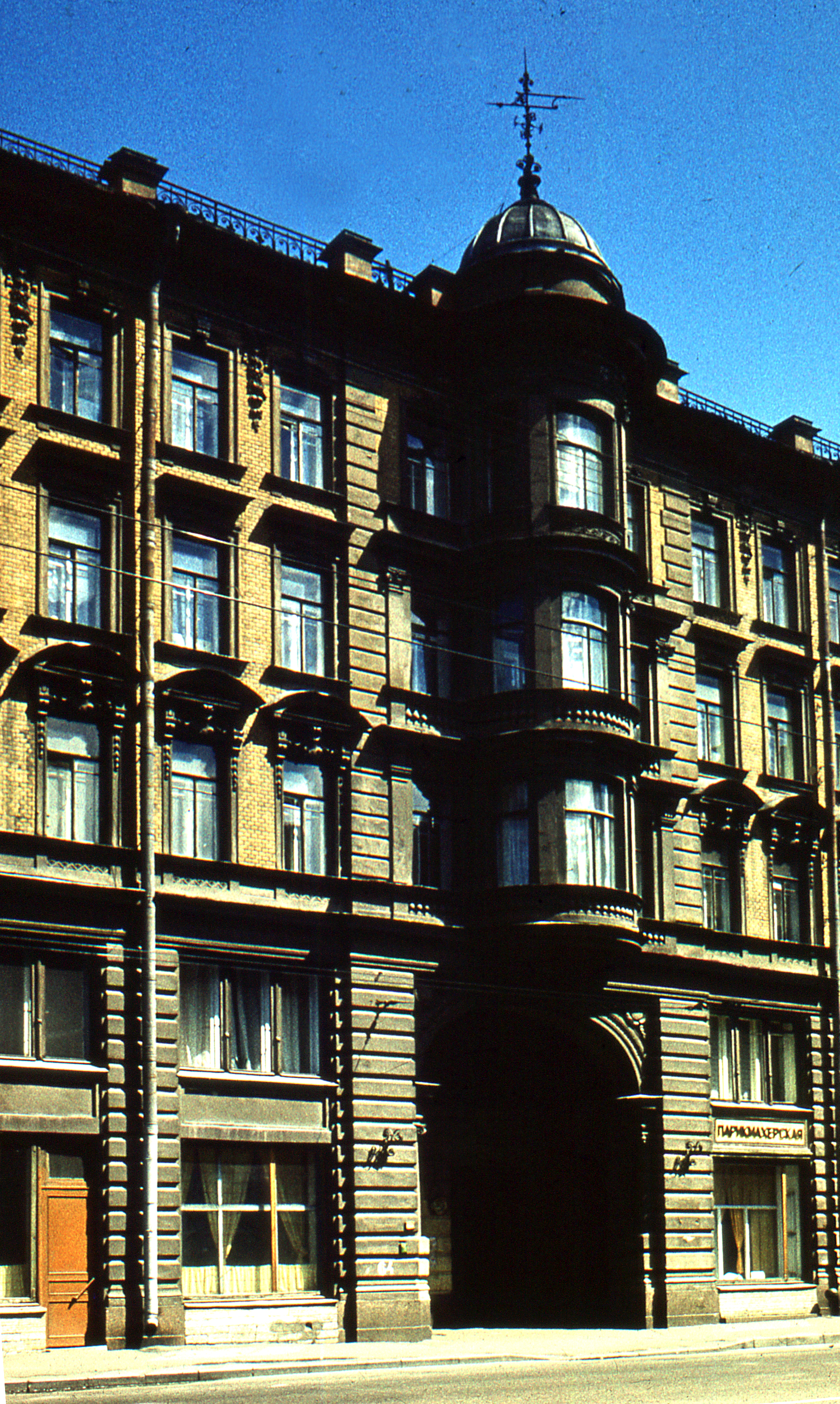
Entrance of Gorochovaia 64. Rasputin's apartment, No. 20, was on the third floor with a view in the courtyard, with the Tsarskoe train station nearby. He lived in this 5-room apartment from May 1914 with a housemaid, her niece and his two daughters.

What little is known about Rasputin's childhood was passed down by Maria. Maria expressed her ideas about their surname; Rasputin. According to her, he was never a monk, but a starets. (As he was not an elder, he would be referred to as a pilgrim.) For Maria, her father's healing practices on Tsarevich Alexei were based on magnetism. According to Maria, Grigory did "look into" the Khlysti's ideas.

Maria records that Rasputin was never the same after the attack by Khioniya Guseva on 12 July [O.S. 29 June] 1914. Maria and her mother accompanied their father to the hospital in Tyumen. Seven weeks later, Rasputin left the hospital and returned to St Petersburg. According to Maria, her father started to drink dessert wines.

Maria was briefly engaged during World War I to a Georgian officer named Pankhadze, who had avoided being sent to the war front due to Rasputin's intervention, and was doing his military service with the reserve battalions in Petrograd. Maria liked to visit the opera and the Ciniselli Circus.

On 17 December 1916, Rasputin was lured to the Moika Palace for a housewarming party organized by Felix Yusupov, whom Rasputin called "The Little One". Yusupov had visited Rasputin regularly in the past few weeks or months. The following day, the two sisters reported their father missing to Anna Vyrubova. Traces of blood were detected on the parapet of the Bolshoy Petrovsky bridge, as well as one of Rasputin's galoshes, stuck between the bridge piles. Maria and her sister affirmed the boot belonged to their father.

Maria asserts that after the attack by Guseva, her father developed hyperacidity and avoided anything with sugar. She and her father's former secretary, Simanovich, doubted he was poisoned at all. It is Maria who mentioned the homosexual advances of Felix Yusupov towards her father. According to her, he was murdered when this was denied. Fuhrmann does not believe Yusupov found Rasputin attractive.

It is not clear whether Rasputin's two daughters were present at Rasputin's burial in Vyrubova's garden, next to the Alexander Palace and the surrounding park, although Maria claimed she was. The two sisters were invited in the Alexandra Palace to play with the four grand duchesses, quite often referred to as OTMA; meanwhile, Maria and her sister had moved into a smaller apartment, owned by her French teacher. They each received an allowance of 50,000 rubles. In April 1917, their mother returned to Pokrovskoye. The next day, the two sisters were locked up in the Tauride Palace and questioned. Boris Soloviev succeeded in gaining their release.

== Life following the Revolution ==
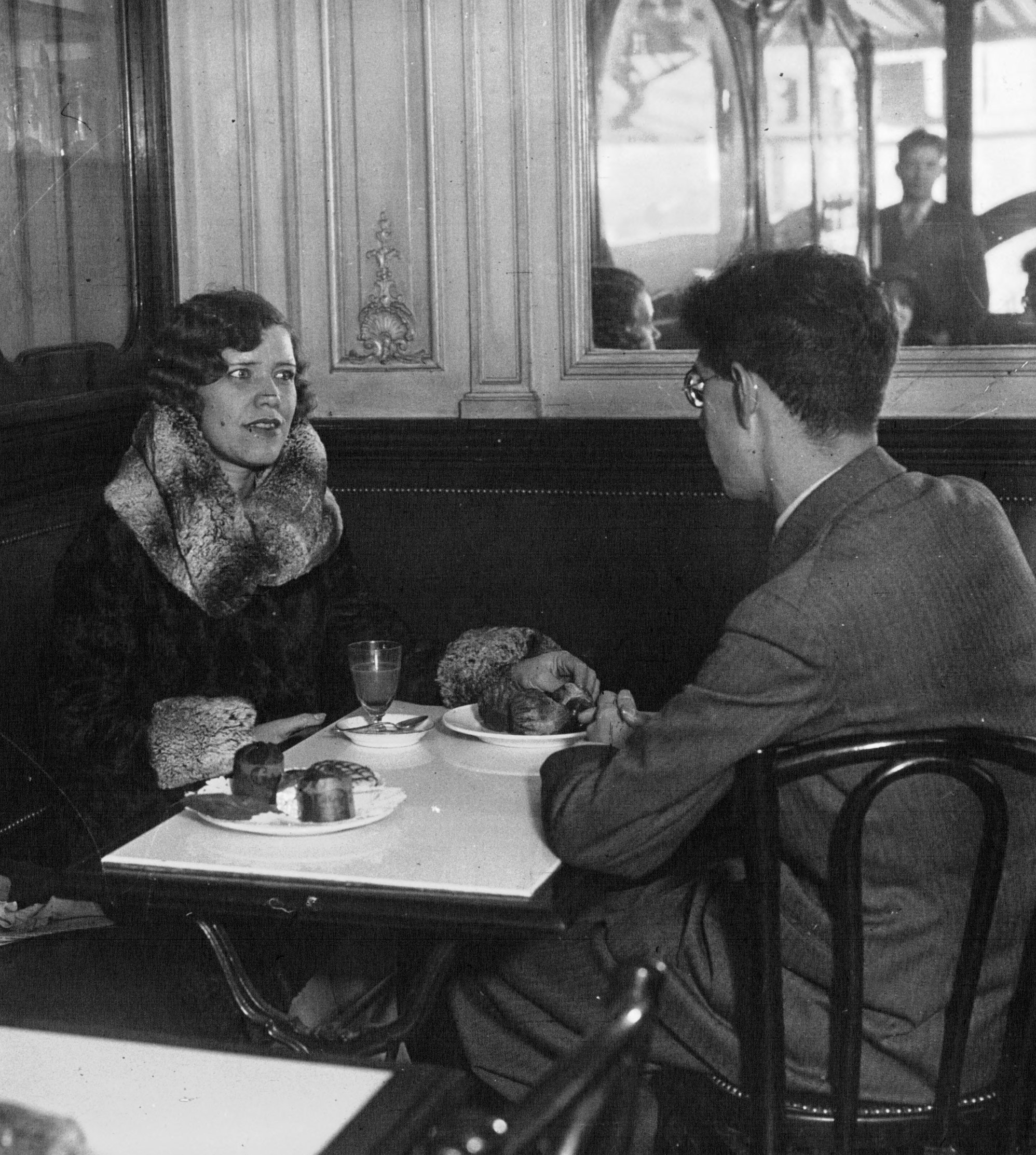
Maria Rasputin being interviewed by a journalist from the Spanish magazine Estampa in 1930

Rasputin had persuaded Maria to marry Boris Soloviev, the charismatic son of Nikolai Soloviev, the Treasurer of the Holy Synod, and one of her father's admirers. Boris Soloviev, a graduate of a school of mysticism, quickly emerged as Rasputin's successor after the murder. Boris, who had studied Madame Blavatsky's theosophy, and hypnotism, attended meetings at which Rasputin's followers attempted to communicate with the dead through prayer meetings and séances. Maria also attended the meetings but later wrote in her diary that she could not understand why her father kept telling her to "love Boris" when the group spoke to him at the séances. She said she did not like Boris at all. Boris was no more enthusiastic about Maria. In his own diary, he wrote that his wife was not even useful for sexual relations because there were so many women who had bodies he found more attractive than hers. In September 1917, Boris received jewels from the Tsarina to help arrange for their escape, but according to Radzinsky, he kept the funds for himself. Nonetheless, she married Boris on October 5, 1917, in the chapel of the Tauride Palace. After the fall of the Russian Provisional Government, the situation got worse. In spring 1918, the couple fled to her mother. They lived in Pokrovskoye, Tyumen and Tobolsk.

Boris and his brother Dmitry turned in the officers who had come to Ekaterinburg to plan the escape of the Romanovs. Boris lost the money he had obtained from the jewels during the Russian Civil War that followed. Boris defrauded prominent Russian families by asking for money for a Romanov impostor to escape to China. Boris also found young women willing to masquerade as one of the grand duchesses for the benefit of the families he had defrauded. (For more information on the betrayal and jewels see the account of Baroness Sophie Buxhoeveden.)

== Exile ==
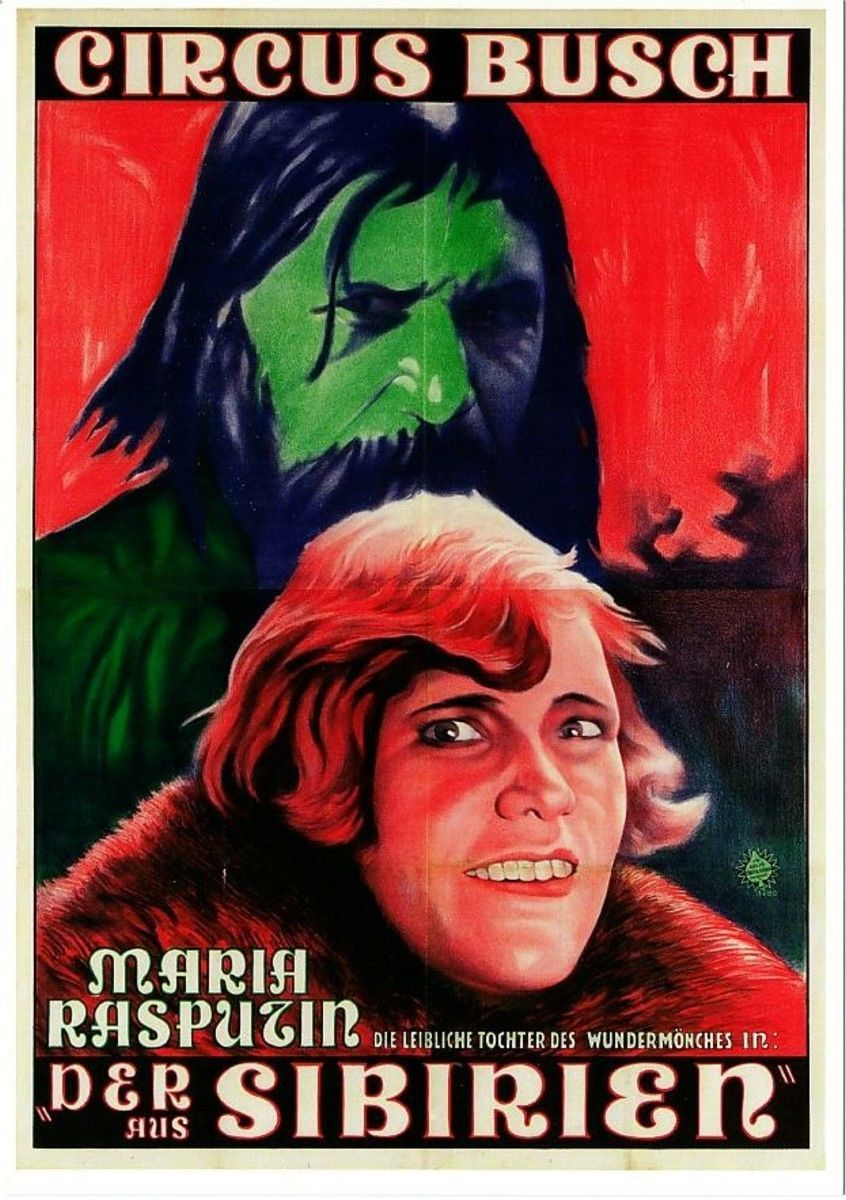
Maria Rasputin promoting Circus Busch in 1928

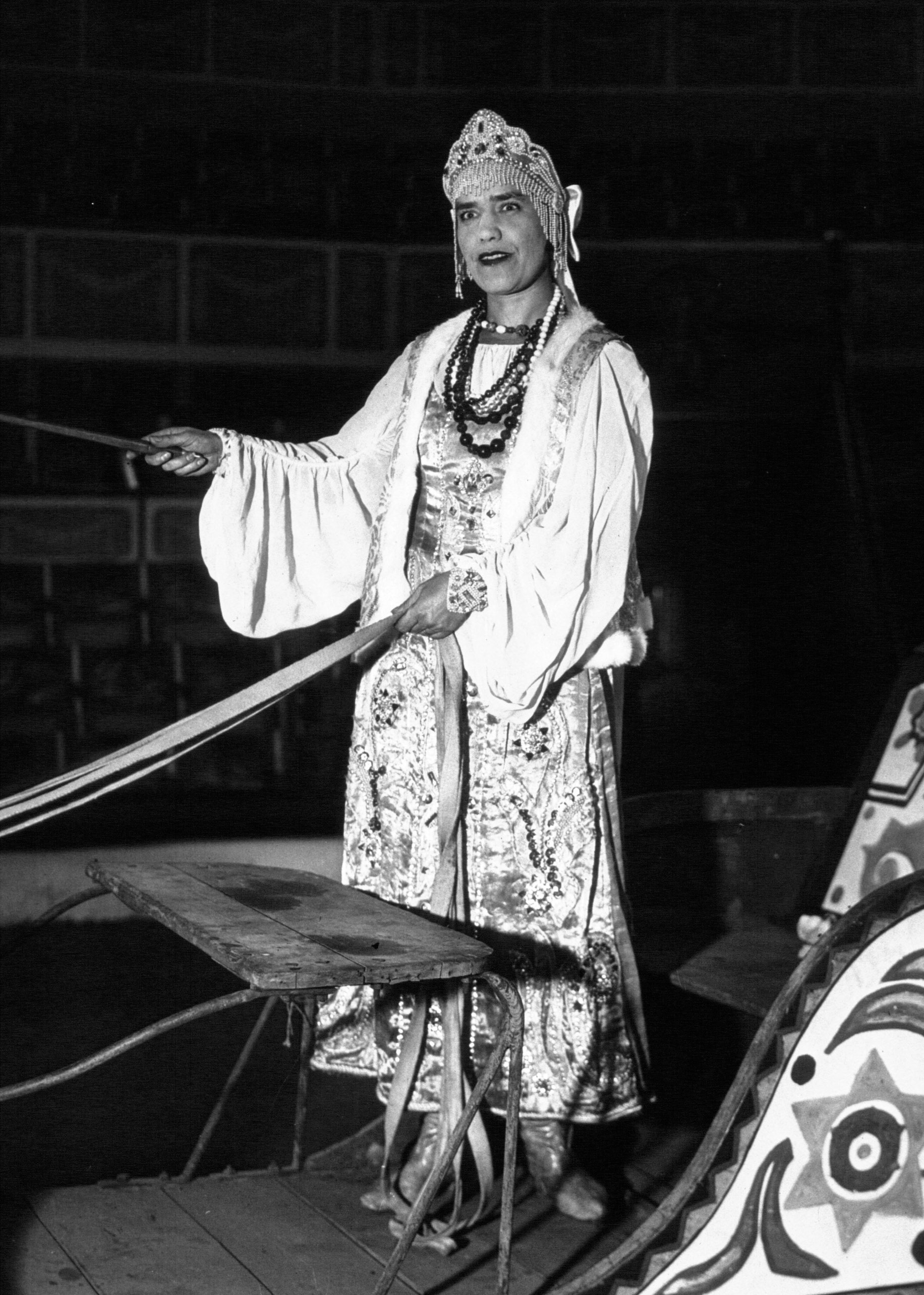
Maria Rasputina with pony act in Paris (1932)

Boris and Maria escaped to Vladivostok, where they lived for almost a year. Boris was arrested by the White Army and sent to Chita, Zabaykalsky Krai. Maria was questioned by Nikolai Sokolov about the Romanov jewels, which had disappeared.

The White émigrés were detained by the revolutionaries. After Tatyana (1920–2009) was born they left by ship for Ceylon, Suez, Trieste and Prague, where the couple opened a Russian restaurant, but business was slow. Then she was invited to work in Vienna. Their second daughter Maria (1922–1976) was born in Baden, Austria.

Maria took dancing lessons in Berlin and stayed with Aron Simanovich, her father's former "bookkeeper". They settled in Montmartre, Paris, where Boris worked in a soap factory, as night porter, car-washer and for the Waterman Pen Company; they lived at Avenue Jean Jaurès. He died of tuberculosis in July 1926 in Hôpital Cochin. Maria was offered a job as a cabaret dancer because of her name. She took more dancing lessons to support their two young daughters and invited her sister Varvara to come to Paris, but in 1925 Varvara died in Moscow of typhus. After Felix Yusupov published his memoir (in 1928) detailing the death of her father, Maria sued Yusupov and Grand Duke Dmitri Pavlovich of Russia in a Paris court for damages of $800,000. She condemned both men as murderers and said any decent person would be disgusted by the ferocity of Rasputin's killing. Maria's claim was dismissed. The French court ruled that it had no jurisdiction over a political killing that took place in Russia. Maria published the first of three memoirs about Rasputin in 1929: The Real Rasputin.

In 1929, she worked at Busch Circus, where she had to dance to "the tragedy of my father's life and death, and be brought face-to-face on the stage with actors who were impersonating him and his murderers. Every time I have to confront my father on the stage a pang of poignant memory shoots through my heart, and I could break down and weep." In 1932, Rasputin, My Father was published. In January 1933, she performed in Cirque d'hiver with a pony act. In December 1934 Maria was in London. In 1935 she found work in the Hagenbeck-Wallace Circus, based in Peru, Indiana. The circus toured America and Maria acted one season as a lion tamer, with Maria billed as "the daughter of the famous mad monk whose feats in Russia astonished the world." She was mauled by a bear in May 1935 but stayed with the circus until it reached Miami, Florida, where she quit before it ceased operations. In 1938, her two daughters were denied entry to the US. Maria was ordered to leave the country within 90 days, but then, in March 1940, she married Gregory Bernadsky, a childhood friend and former White Russian Army officer, in Miami. In 1946, they divorced and she became a U.S. citizen. In 1947 her younger daughter Maria married in Paris to Gideon Walrave Boissevain (1897–1985), minister plenipotentiary in Greece, Chile, Israel, then Dutch ambassador to Cuba.

She began work as a riveter, either in Miami or in a San Pedro, Los Angeles, California shipyard during World War II. Maria worked in defense plants until 1955 when she was forced to retire because of her age. After that, she supported herself by working in hospitals, giving Russian lessons, and babysitting for friends.

In 1968, Maria claimed to be psychic and said Pat Nixon had come to her in a dream. At one point, she said she recognized Anna Anderson as Grand Duchess Anastasia Nikolaevna of Russia, a claim she would later recant. Maria had two pet dogs, whom she called Ioussou and Pov after Felix Yusupov.

During the last years of her life, she lived in Los Angeles, living on Social Security benefits.

== Legacy ==
Maria told her grandchildren that her father taught her to be generous, even in times when she was in need herself. Rasputin said she should never leave home with empty pockets, but should always have something to give to the poor. Her granddaughter Laurence Huot-Solovieff, the daughter of Maria's daughter Tatyana, recalled in 2005 that according to Maria, their infamous great-grandfather was a "simple man with a big heart and strong spiritual power, who loved Russia, God, and the Tsar."

== See also ==
- Nicholas and Alexandra: An Intimate Account of the Last of the Romanovs and the Fall of Imperial Russia
