= Masterman =

Masterman may refer to:

- Masterman (horse), an American Thoroughbred racehorse
- Julia R. Masterman School, a middle and secondary school located in Philadelphia, Pennsylvania
- ST Masterman, an Admiralty tugboat
- A Lover in Pawn, a 1920 Swedish film, known as Mästerman in Swedish

== People ==
=== Sons of Thomas W. Masterman ===
- Arthur Masterman (1869–1941) British zoologist and author
- Charles Masterman (1873–1927), British Liberal politician and journalist
- Howard Masterman (1867–1933) Bishop of Plymouth
- Walter S. Masterman (1876–1946), English author of mystery, fantasy, horror and science fiction

=== Other people named Masterman ===
- Edward Masterman (1880–1957), senior Royal Air Force officer
- Jeff Masterman, Australian rugby league footballer (played in the 1970s and 1980s)
- John Cecil Masterman (1891–1977), academic and author involved in English anti-espionage during World War II
- Lucy Masterman (1884–1977), British Liberal politician, diarist, and poet; wife of Charles F. G. Masterman
- Margaret Masterman (1910–1986), British linguist and philosopher; daughter of Charles F. G. Masterman
- Rex Hunt (diplomat) or Sir Rex Masterman Hunt (born 1926), British diplomat and colonial administrator
- Sir Thomas Hardy, 1st Baronet or Sir Thomas Masterman Hardy (1769–1839), officer of the Royal Navy
- Wally Masterman (1888–1965), English footballer

=== Characters ===
- Edward Henry Masterman, a character in Agatha Christie's novel Murder on the Orient Express

== See also ==
- Master Man
