= Rasputin – Miracles Lie in the Eye of the Beholder =

Soundtrack album
- Released: March 11, 2009
- Label: Nasdrovia

Rasputin – Miracles Lie in the Eye of the Beholder is a rock opera about the mysterious and infamous Russian peasant, Grigori Rasputin. Written by Michael Rapp, musician and author of several musicals and film scores, Rasputin is a triple CD concept album featuring Ted Neeley (of Jesus Christ Superstar fame) as Rasputin, British actor John Hurt as the Narrator, and Amanda McBroom as Tsarina Alexandra. On December 18, 1999, a single night showcase of Rasputin was performed at the Grand Opera House in Wilmington, Delaware featuring:

- Ted Neeley as the Mad Monk Rasputin
- James O'Neil as Tsar Nicholas II
- M. Ross Ramone as Alexei
- Caitlin Custer as Anastasia
- Larry Friedman as Derevenko
- Christopher P. Carey as Doctor Botkin

Rasputin is one of many projects in line for a full production in the coming future, pending cast availability.

== Concept album cast ==
- Rasputin — Ted Neeley
- Narrator — John Hurt
- Tsarina Alexandra — Amanda McBroom
- Prince Yusupov — Bradley Dean
- Tsar Nicholas II — James O' Neil
- Alexei — Ross Ramone
- Gypsy — Dianna Collins Jennings
- Olga Nikolaevna — Sarah Gliko
- Tatiana Nikolaevna — Katie Walsh
- Maria Nikolaevna — Tracy Stephens
- Anastasia — Krissy Doyle
- Doctor Botkin — Christopher Carey
- Rebel — Anthony Dibenedetto
- Mysterious Lady/Peasant Girl — Christine Rea
- Derevenko — Larry Friedman

== Concept album track listing ==
Act I — Gold Disc

1. Assassination
2. Grand Waltz/Heaven Help Us
3. The Meeting
4. Don't Dress Me in Gray
5. God Save the Tsar
6. We'd Rather Die
7. Tell Me If You Think I'm Russian
8. Never Give Up On You
9. Prelude
10. Father Gregory
11. Prelude
12. Sweeter When Love is Secret

Act II – Green Disc

1. Eternity/Prelude
2. Never Say Die
3. The Bishop & the Empress
4. God is Good
5. Let's All Move to Sibera
6. Prelude
7. Peasant Dance
8. How You Gonna Know?
9. I Owe You
10. They Must Never Know
11. Prelude
12. Nasdrovia!

Act III — Purple Disc

1. Prelude
2. Because of You
3. Prelude
4. With Every Drop
5. Kill the Devil With a Kiss
6. Blood on Your Hands
7. Kill the Devil Too
8. Rasputin's Death/The Letter & Montage
9. God Where Are You Now?
10. The Other Side
11. The Other Side II
12. Bonus — Eternity Too
