= The Wages of Sin (novel) =

1999 novel by David A. McIntee

- Author: David A. McIntee
- Series: Doctor Who book: Past Doctor Adventures
- Release number: 19
- Subject: Featuring: Third Doctor; Jo Grant and Liz Shaw
- Set in: Period between; The Three Doctors and Carnival of Monsters; and before; "The Power of the Doctor"
- Publisher: BBC Books
- Publication date: 1 February 1999
- Pages: 250
- ISBN: 0-563-55567-X
- Preceded by: Salvation
- Followed by: Deep Blue

The Wages of Sin is a BBC Books original novel written by David A. McIntee and based on the long-running British science fiction television series Doctor Who. It features the Third Doctor, Liz Shaw and Jo Grant. The events of the novel apparently take place immediately following The Three Doctors.

It is noteworthy for depicting the Doctor's first test flight of the TARDIS following the restoration of his time-travelling abilities. It also shows Liz's first trip in the TARDIS, since the Doctor was unable to work the ship during her time with him as a companion.

During the story, the Doctor, Jo and Liz meet Rasputin, who would return in the 2022 television special "The Power of the Doctor", revealed to have been a form of the Master.
