= Pokrovskoye, Tyumen Oblast =

Village in Russia, birthplace of Grigori Rasputin

Pokrovskoye Покро́вское
- Village
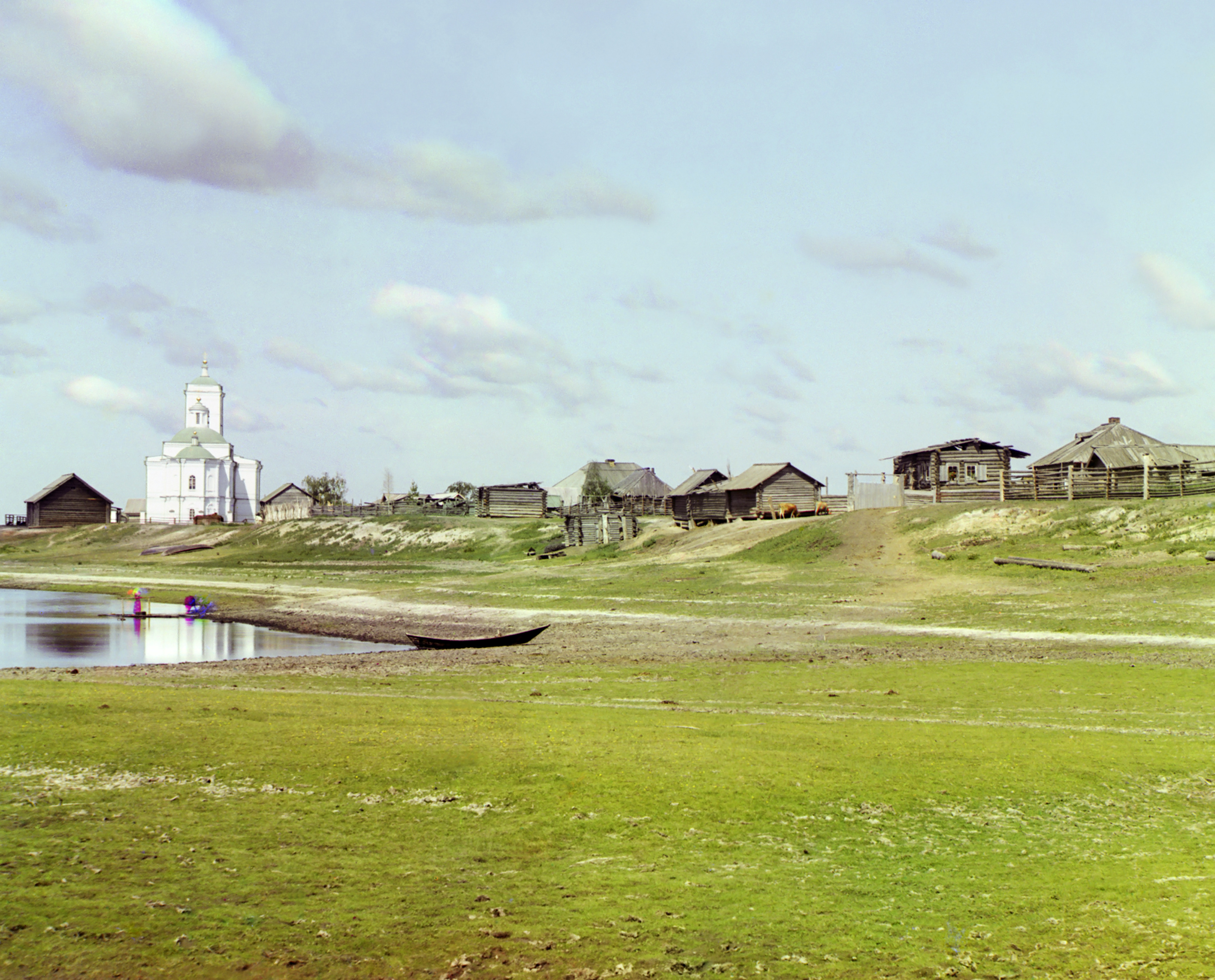
- Pokrovskoye in 1912

- Location of Pokrovskoye in Russia
- Coordinates: 57°14′33″N 66°47′26″E
- Country: Russia
- Federal subject: Tyumen Oblast
- District: Yarkovsky District

Pokrovskoye (Russian: Покро́вское) is a village in Yarkovsky District, Tyumen Oblast, Russia. It is known as the birthplace of Grigori Rasputin, and it has a museum dedicated to him.

== Grigori Rasputin House-Museum ==
The museum was founded by the villagers of Pokrovskoye in 1990. The actual house in which Rasputin lived is not preserved; it was across the street from the current museum. The museum resembles the original building. It is the first private museum dedicated to the life of Rasputin in Russia.

== Climate ==
Pokrovskoye has a typical southern Siberian humid continental climate (Köppen: Dfb), bordering on a subarctic climate (Köppen: Dfc).

Climate data for Pokrovskoye
Month	Jan	Feb	Mar	Apr	May	Jun	Jul	Aug	Sep	Oct	Nov	Dec	Year
Mean daily maximum °C (°F)	−14.1 (6.6)	−11.9 (10.6)	−3.0 (26.6)	7.5 (45.5)	16.1 (61.0)	21.6 (70.9)	23.8 (74.8)	20.1 (68.2)	14.4 (57.9)	4.4 (39.9)	−5.0 (23.0)	−10.8 (12.6)	5.3 (41.5)
Daily mean °C (°F)	−18.2 (−0.8)	−16.5 (2.3)	−8.1 (17.4)	2.7 (36.9)	10.4 (50.7)	16.2 (61.2)	18.8 (65.8)	15.3 (59.5)	9.8 (49.6)	1.1 (34.0)	−8.3 (17.1)	−14.6 (5.7)	0.7 (33.3)
Mean daily minimum °C (°F)	−22.3 (−8.1)	−21.1 (−6.0)	−13.1 (8.4)	−2.0 (28.4)	4.8 (40.6)	10.8 (51.4)	13.8 (56.8)	10.5 (50.9)	5.3 (41.5)	−2.1 (28.2)	−11.6 (11.1)	−18.4 (−1.1)	−3.8 (25.2)
Average precipitation mm (inches)	25 (1.0)	17 (0.7)	16 (0.6)	26 (1.0)	40 (1.6)	62 (2.4)	87 (3.4)	62 (2.4)	48 (1.9)	39 (1.5)	34 (1.3)	28 (1.1)	484 (18.9)
