= Abalak, Tyumen Oblast =

Abalak Абалак
- Selo
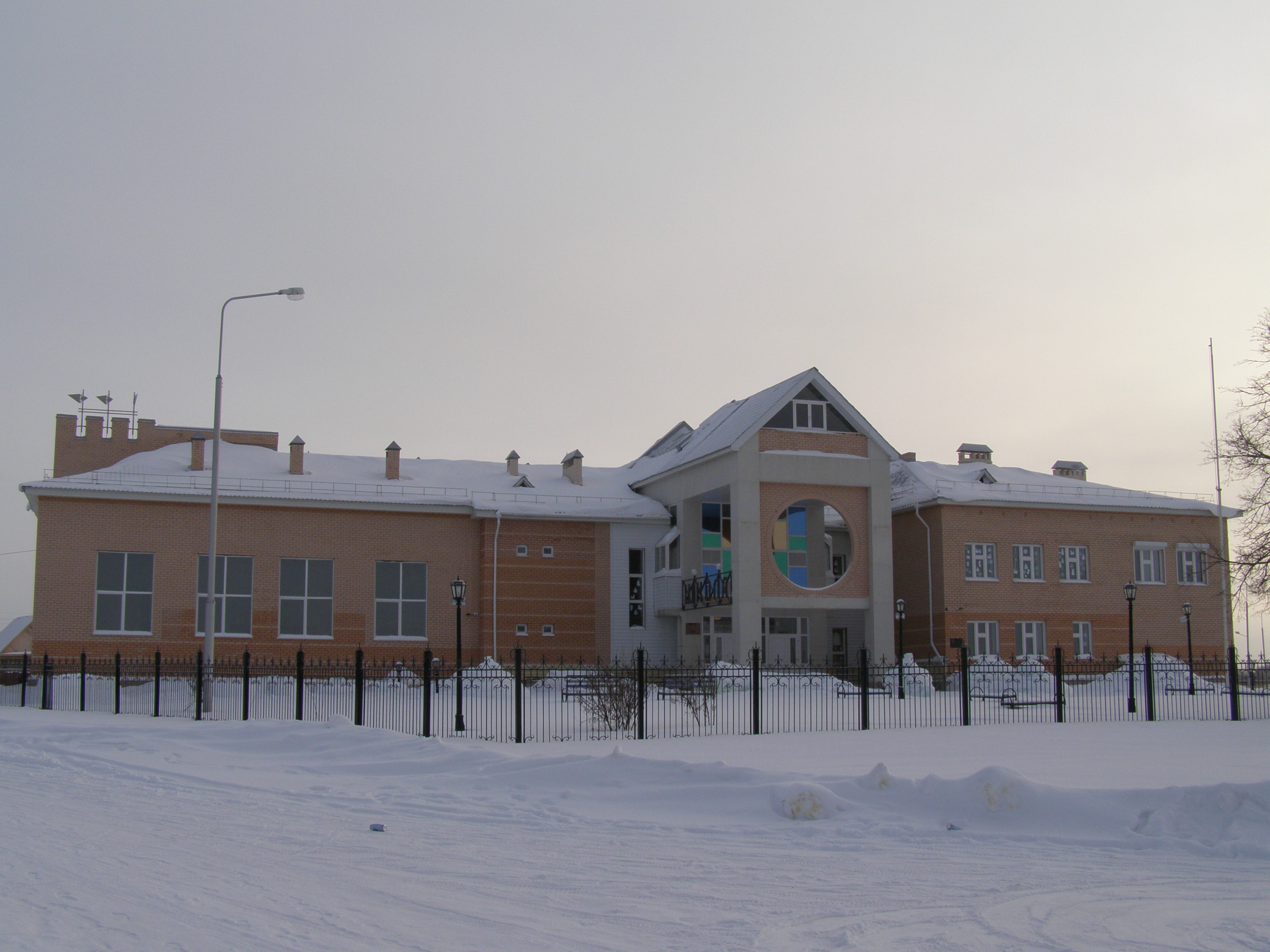

- Location within Tyumen Oblast Location within Russia
- Coordinates: 58°07′N 68°35′E
- Country: Russia
- Region: Tyumen Oblast
- District: Tobolsky District
- Time zone: UTC+5

Abalak (Russian: Абалак) is a rural locality (a selo) and the administrative center of Abalkskoye Rural Settlement of Tobolsky District, Tyumen Oblast, Russia. The population was 806 as of 2010. There are 20 streets.

== History ==
Before the conquest of Siberia, Abalak was a small Tatar town. It got its name from the Tatar prince Abalak, the son of the Siberian khan Mar. On December 5, 1584, near the walls of Abalak, a battle between the Cossacks and the horde of Mametkul took place, which opened Ermak the way to the further conquest of Siberia.

The modern village arose in the 17th century on the site of the fortress and estate of the Siberian khan Kuchum.

In 1636, the Abalak Sign of the Mother of God appeared to a local woman, Mary, after which the wooden Church of the Sign was built in Abalak. At the turn of the 17th-18th centuries, a whole complex of stone temples were erected here. In 1783, the Holy Sign Monastery was opened here.

== Geography ==
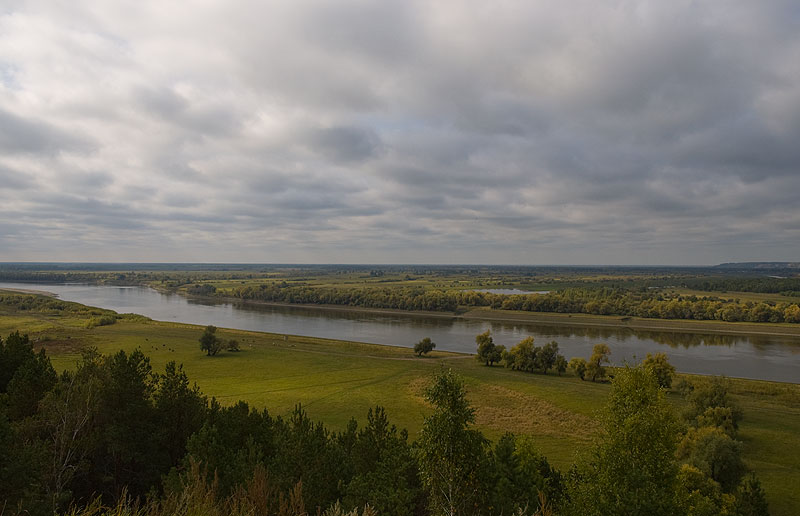
Irtysh river

Abalak is located 28 kilometres (17 mi) southeast of Tobolsk (the district's administrative centre) by road. Preobrazhenka is the nearest rural locality.

== Attractions ==
- Abalak Monastery with Abalak Sign of the Mother of God
- The tourist complex “Abalak” is located 20 km from the city of Tobolsk on the high bank of the Irtysh. The wooden fortress was erected next to the Abalaksky Holy Sign Monastery and is a reconstruction of the Siberian fort from the time of the conquest of Siberia by the Cossacks of Yermak Timofeyevich.
