= Ekaterina Elbakyan =

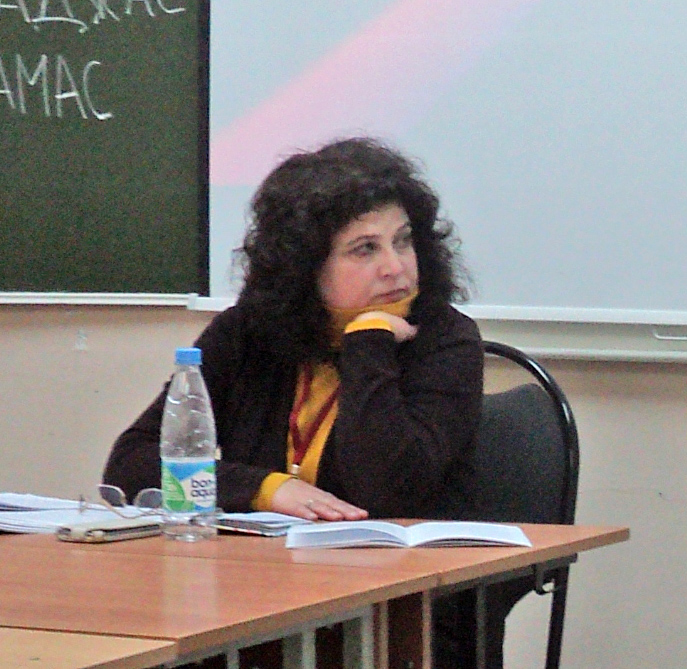
- E. S. Elbakyan at the Third Congress of Religious Studies Scholars.
- Born: February 21, 1962 (age 64); Moscow, Russian SFSR, USSR
- Alma mater: Moscow University's Department of Philosophy; Moscow State University
- Employer: Academy of Labour and Social Relations

Ekaterina Sergeyevna Elbakyan (born February 21, 1962, Moscow, USSR) is a Soviet and Russian religious studies scholar specializing in the philosophical and methodological foundations of religious studies, religious doctrines, and ideology.

== Life ==
In 1985, she graduated with honors from the Faculty of Philosophy at Lomonosov Moscow State University with a degree in philosophy. In 1989, she completed her postgraduate studies at the same university.

On January 8, 1990, at Lomonosov Moscow State University, under the academic supervision of Yuri F. Borunkov, she defended her dissertation for the degree of Candidate of Philosophical Sciences on the topic Критический анализ христианской трактовки социальной справедливости (A Critical Analysis of the Christian Interpretation of Social Justice), specialization in Scientific Atheism, Religion (History and Modernity). The official reviewers were Alexey Alekseevich Radugin and Nikolái Semiónovich Semionkin. The host institution was the Department of Marxist–Leninist Philosophy at the Moscow Aviation Institute.

From 1992 to 2002, she worked at the Religion in Modern Society Research Center at the Russian Independent Institute for Social and National Problems: from 1993 to 1997, she served as a senior research fellow, and from 1997 to 2002, as a principal research fellow. On June 10, 1999, the Council of the Autonomous Non-Profit Organization Russian Independent Institute for Social and National Problems awarded her the academic title of Senior Research Fellow.

In 1996, she defended her dissertation at the Russian Independent Institute for Social and National Problems (RINISNP) to earn a Doctor of Philosophy degree on the topic Религиозный феномен в сознании российской интеллигенции XIX — начала XX в. (Философско-исторический анализ) (The Religious Phenomenon in the Consciousness of the Russian Intelligentsia in the 19th and Early 20th Centuries (A Philosophical and Historical Analysis)).

As of December 2010, she held the position of senior research fellow at the Institute of General History of the Russian Academy of Sciences. From 2012 to 2017, she was a professor in the Academic department of Sociology of Social Process Management at the Academy of Labor and Social Relations (ATiSO). She is a member of the European Association for the Study of Religion. From 2009 to 2016, she served as director of the Autonomous Non-Profit Organization for Consulting and Expert Services "Center for Religious Studies 'ReligioPolis'" (founder and editor-in-chief of the online newspaper Religiopolis.org, the center's information resource, created with the active participation of the editorial staff of the Portal-Credo.ru, M. N. Sitnikov)

In March 2014, at the request of one of the defense attorneys for the defendants, Viktor Zhenkov, she participated as an expert witness in the trial of Jehovah's Witnesses in Taganrog.

Since 2017, she has been a member representing the Central Federal District on the Expert Council of Religious Researchers at the Department of State-Religious Relations of the Russian Presidential Academy of National Economy and Public Administration (RANEPA).

== Works ==
Elbakyan is the author of 391 scholarly works, including three monographs. She is a scholarly editor and member of the editorial boards of 11 academic journals; author of scholarly translations from English, including Friedrich Max Müller's Introduction to the Science of Religion (2002), the Westminster Dictionary of Theological Terms (2004), and a number of articles in the publications Anthology of Religious Studies and Classics of World Religious Studies. Coordinator, one of the chief editors, and author of such projects as Religious Studies. Encyclopedic Dictionary, Religious Studies: A Student's Dictionary, and Encyclopedia of Religions. Member of the Scientific and Expert Council and scientific editor for the Religion and Mythology section of the New Russian Encyclopedia. Executive Secretary of the editorial board of the scientific-theoretical journal Religious Studies. She has authored a number of scholarly religious studies expert reports on the doctrine and functioning of religious associations operating in Russia.

Theses

- Элбакян, Е. С. (1989). Критический анализ христианской трактовки социальной справедливости [A Critical Analysis of the Christian Interpretation of Social Justice] (автореферат дис. ... кандидата философских наук : 09.00.06). М.: МГУ имени М. В. Ломоносова. Archived from the original on 2015-12-08.
- Элбакян, Е. С. (1996). Религиозный феномен в сознании российской интеллигенции XIX - начала XX вв. : Философско-исторический анализ [The Religious Phenomenon in the Consciousness of the Russian Intelligentsia in the 19th and Early 20th Centuries (A Philosophical and Historical Analysis)] (автореферат дис. ... доктора философских наук : 09.00.06). М.: Рос. независимый ин-т социальных и национальных проблем.
