= Master Man =

Master Man, in comics, may refer to:

- Master Man (Fawcett Comics), Fawcett Comics superhero
- Master Man (Marvel Comics), Marvel Comics villain
- Master Man (Quality Comics), Kid Eternity villain who made several appearances
