= 1777 in Russia =

- Decades: 1750s; 1760s; 1770s; 1780s; 1790s
- See also: History of Russia; Timeline of Russian history; List of years in Russia

This is a list of notable events from the year 1777 in Russia.

== Incumbents ==
- Monarch – Catherine II

== Events ==
- Pavlovsk was founded.
- Rybnaya sloboda was renamed Rybinsk.
- Stavropol was founded.
- Russo-Prussian Alliance was extended.
- Beloozero was renamed Belozersk.

== Births ==
- Alexander I of Russia, Emperor of Russia
- Nikita Yakovlevich Bichurin, a Russian monk
- Alexander Bashilov, a Russian general
- Peter Petrovich Dolgorukov, Russian officer
- Anna Lopukhina, Russian imperial mistress
- Karl Wilhelm von Toll, Russian military leader

== Deaths ==
- Alexander Sumarokov, Russian poet
