= 1778 in Russia =

- Decades: 1750s; 1760s; 1770s; 1780s; 1790s
- See also: History of Russia; Timeline of Russian history; List of years in Russia

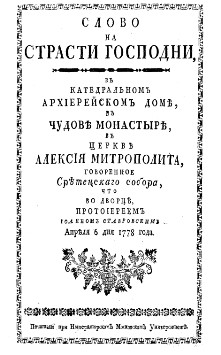
Stavrovskiy

Events from the year 1778 in Russia.

== Incumbents ==
- Monarch – Catherine II

== Events ==
- Emigration of Christians from the Crimea in 1778
- The city of Kherson is established.
- The city of Mariupol is established.
- Nikolas Novikov takes over the Moscow University Press and begins publishing "The Drone" for which he is later imprisoned by Catherine II.

== Births ==
- 20 September - Fabian Gottlieb von Bellingshausen, Cartographer and Explorer

== Deaths ==
- Anna Sergeyevna Dolgorukaya, Pedagogue, Noble, and Courtier
