= Grigory Golitsyn =

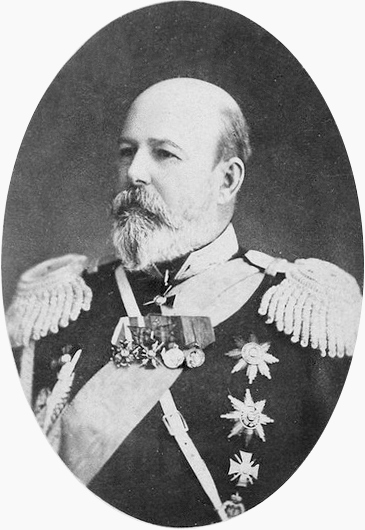
- Golitsyn in 1897
- Born: 20 December [O.S. 8 December] 1838; Podlasie Governorate, Poland
- Died: 28 March [O.S. 15 March] 1907; Saint Petersburg, Russian Empire
- Education: General Staff Academy
- Occupation: Military commander
- Family: Lev Golitsyn (brother)
- Awards: Order of Saint Alexander Nevsky (1895); Order of Saint Vladimir (1904)

Prince Grigory Sergeyevich Golitsyn (Russian: Григо́рий Серге́евич Голи́цын; 20 December 1838 – 28 March 1907) was a Russian general and statesman from the princely Golitsyn family.

== Biography ==
Born on 20 December 1838 (1 January 1839) on the estate Staraya Ves in the Hungrovsky district of the Podlasie Governorate (another date of birth is also indicated - 20 October 1838 and the place of birth - the village of Garbów, Lublin district, Lublin Governorate) ... His parents: father - Prince Sergei Grigorievich (1803-1868), retired captain of the Guards artillery, writer; mother - Maria Ivanovna, nee Countess Ezerskaya (1819-1881). Brothers and sisters: Julia (1840-1914, maid of honor), Maria (1841-1896, married to the chamberlain of the Austrian court, Count Friedrich Rummerskirch), Catherine (1844-1864), Lev (1845-1915, chief winemaker of the Main Directorate of estates), Fedor (1850-1920, chamberlain, leader of the nobility of the Khvalynsky district of the Saratov province).

Educated in the Page Corps, from where he was released on 16 June 1856 as a cornet in the Life Guards Hussar Regiment.

On 12 May 1858, he was assigned to the headquarters of the Guards Corps to prepare for admission to the Nikolaev Academy of the General Staff and on August 25 was admitted; On 12 April 1859, he was promoted to lieutenant and on 17 October 1860, to staff captain. After graduating from the course at the Academy on 18 December 1860, he was appointed to be at the main headquarters of the Caucasian army; On 19 January 1861, he was promoted to captain for advances in science.

In the campaign of 1861, as part of the Adagum detachment of Major General Pavel Babych, he took part in a number of expeditions against the mountaineers. In March–May he was in the Abinsky gorge and was engaged in correcting the roads between the camp of the detachment and the fortifications of Nikolayevsky, Crimean and Olginsky, all these activities were accompanied by numerous skirmishes with the mountaineers. At the end of May, he was on the move to Gelendzhik Bay, and distinguished himself in capturing enemy positions on the Kesegur ridge. For distinction in the campaign, he was awarded on 16 January 1861, the Order of Saint Anna, 3rd degree with swords and a bow.

On 22 January 1862, Golitsyn was promoted to lieutenant colonel and, after serving in the spring and summer in staff positions in Tbilisi, on 16 September, he was transferred to the Life Grenadier Erivan Regiment, where he took the post of commander of the combined rifle battalion.

In the campaign of 1863-1864, which ended the Caucasian War, Golitsyn took part, as part of the same Adagum detachment, in a campaign against the mountaineers of Abkhazia, and from 26 December 1863 to 17 January 1864, he temporarily commanded a regiment. 26 May 1864 dismissed for six months on vacation; On 2 October of the same year he was promoted to colonel.

On 10 December 1865, Golitsyn was appointed commander of the 14th Georgian Grenadier Regiment, which he commanded for six years. For bringing the regiment into exemplary condition on 13 August 1868, he was awarded the Order of St. Anna 2nd degree with swords. On 21 September 1871, he was appointed aide-de-camp to His Imperial Majesty, leaving his post, and the next year, on April 16, he was appointed commander of the Finnish Life Guards Regiment. On 30 August 1873, he was promoted to major general and appointed to the Retinue of His Imperial Majesty. On 26 August 1876 he was awarded the Order of St. Vladimir 3rd degree.

On 30 August 1876, Golitsyn was appointed military governor and commander of the troops of the Ural region and the chief chieftain of the Ural Cossack army. In September 1880, he temporarily performed the affairs of the Orenburg Governor-General and Commander of the Orenburg Military District; On 26 February 1883 he was promoted to lieutenant general.

Golitsyn fought in the Caucasian War, studied at the General Staff Academy, and commanded several regiments. In 1876, was appointed Governor of Ural Oblast; he later served in a variety of positions in other regions.

He was dismissed from his post as military governor and orderly chieftain and was appointed to be present in the 1st department of the Senate from 5 January 1885.

On 16 January 1892, he was sent to the Tobolsk province to arrange a food unit; in February, for the same purpose, he visited the Shadrinsky, Kamyshlovsky and Yekaterinburg districts of the Perm province and the Troitsky district of the Orenburg province. On 1 January 1893, he was appointed a member of the State Council.

On 14 May 1896, he was promoted to general from infantry, and after the death of SA Sheremetev in December of the same year, he was appointed chief of the Caucasian administration, commander of the Caucasian military district and ataman of the Caucasian Cossack troops; On 2 March 1897, he was appointed adjutant general, leaving his posts.

Golitsyn had a sharply negative attitude towards the Armenian national movement. The journalist A. V. Amfiteatrov has preserved one of the Golitsyn witticisms for history: "I will bring to the point that the only Armenian in Tbilisi will be a stuffed Armenian in the Tiflis Museum!" The unprincipled, but not mediocre publicist Vasily Velichko, editor of the official newspaper Kavkaz, became the main ideologist of the Golitsyn course. G.S. Golitsyn was one of the initiators of the adoption of the law on the confiscation of the property of the Armenian Apostolic Church and on the closure of Armenian schools on 12 June 1903. According to the law, all immovable property (including the territory of the Echmiadzin Monastery) and capital belonging to the Armenian Church and spiritual institutions were transferred to the jurisdiction of the state. From the proceeds from the confiscated property and funds, a share was allocated to their previous owners - Armenian spiritual institutions.

Between 1897 and 1904 Golitsyn was the Governor of Transcaucasia; known as the initiator of the confiscation of the properties of the Armenian Church. He was wounded in an assassination attempt near Tiflis in October 1903.

On 14 October of the same year, General Golitsyn was seriously wounded on the Kojorskoe highway near Tiflis as a result of a terrorist act committed by members of the Armenian Social Democratic Party "Hnchak". On 11 August 1904, Golitsyn was awarded the Order of St. Vladimir, 1st degree for his work in managing the Caucasus. Golitsyn remained in the post of chief executive until 1 January 1905, when he was appointed to be with the person of His Imperial Majesty.

After the reform of the State Council (1906), Golitsyn remained its member, was a member of the right-wing group.

He died on 28 March (10 April), 1907 in Saint Petersburg, was buried at the Nikolskoye cemetery of the Alexander Nevsky Lavra.

He was married to the daughter of Lieutenant General Count FV Orlov-Denisov, Maria; they had no children.
