= Okhansky =

Okhansky (masculine), Okhanskaya (feminine), or Okhanskoye (neuter) may refer to:

- Okhansky District, a district of Perm Krai, Russia
- Okhansky Uyezd (1781–1923), an administrative division of the Russian Empire and the early RSFSR
- Okhanskoye Urban Settlement, a municipal formation which the town of Okhansk in Okhansky District of Perm Krai, Russia is incorporated as
