= Anna Rasputina =

Russian revolutionary (1874–1908)

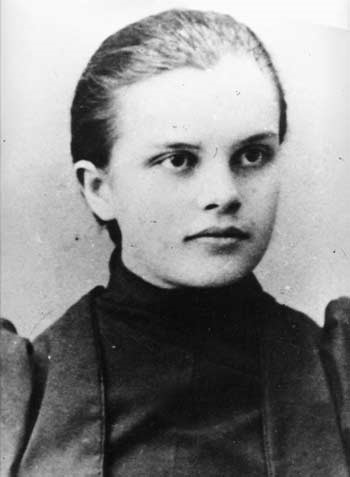
- Born: 6 December 1874; Novoye Ussolje, Solikamsky Uyezd, Perm Governorate, Russian Empire
- Died: 17 February 1908 (aged 33); Lisiy Nos, Saint Petersburg, Russian Empire
- Cause of death: Execution by hanging
- Education: Bestuzhev Courses
- Organization: Narodnaya Volya
- Political party: Socialist Revolutionary Party
- Spouse: Ivan Spiridonovic Rasputin (m. 1898)
- Children: 2

Anna Mikhailovna Rasputina (Russian: Анна Михайловна Распутина, née Shulyatikov, 6 December 1874 – 17 February 1908) was a Russian revolutionary and a member of the revolutionary socialist political organization Narodnaya Volya.

== Biography ==
Rasputina was born in the village of Novoye Ussolje in the Solikamsky Uyezd, Perm Governorate. Her father was the exile Mikhail Ivanovich Shulyatikov [ru] (who had participated in the attempt to raise a military-peasant rebellion in the Volga region during the January Uprising of 1863) and her brother was Vladimir Mikhailovich Shulyatikov [ru]. In 1882, the Shulyatikov family moved to Moscow.

Rasputina graduated from the 4th Moscow Women's Gymnasium then studied at the Imperial Russian women's institution, Bestuzhev Courses, in Saint Petersburg.

In 1894, Rasputina became a member of the revolutionary socialist organisation Narodnaya Volya, which conducted assassinations of government officials in an attempt to overthrow the autocratic Tsarist system. She participated in the formation of the illegal "Lakhta Printing House," which was destroyed in 1896. After the destruction of the printing house, she went into hiding with her brother in Cherepovets.

In December 1896, Rasputina was arrested alongside Ukrainian revolutionary Mariia Vetrova and was imprisoned in the Peter and Paul Fortress in Saint Petersburg. In January 1898, she was exiled to Eastern Siberia for five years.

While travelling to exile, Rasputina met fellow political exile Ivan Spiridonovic Rasputin and they married at the prison church of the transit prison in Yakutsk on 19 August 1898. She gave birth to their daughter Yekaterina in Nizhne-Kolymsk in 1899 and their second daughter Natalja in Yakutsk in 1902.

In November 1904, Rasputina returned to Saint Petersburg. She joined the Socialist Revolutionary Party (PSR) and was a member of the Combat Organization of the Socialist Revolutionary Party, the terrorist wing of the party. She participated in plotting assassination attempts on figures including Colonel Anatoly Ivanov and General Georgi Alexandrovich Min.

Rasputina organized the assassination attempt on the Minister of Justice Ivan Shcheglovitov. Due to the activities of the double agent and agent provocateur Yevno Azef, she was arrested on 7 February 1908. She was found carrying a bomb in her muff. She was again imprisoned in the Peter and Paul Fortress and the Saint Petersburg Military District Court sentenced her to death. She was hanged on 17 February 1908 at Lisiy Nos, aged 33, and was executed with Vsevolod Lebedintsev and Lydia Augustovna Petrovna.
