= Foki =

Foki Фоки
- Selo
- Location within Perm Krai Location within Russia
- Coordinates: 56°41′N 54°21′E
- Country: Russia
- Region: Perm Krai
- District: Chaykovsky
- Time zone: UTC+5:00

Foki (Russian: Фоки) is a rural locality (a selo) and the administrative center of Fokinskoye Rural Settlement, Chaykovsky, Perm Krai, Russia. The population was 3,593 as of 2010. There are 36 streets.

In ХІХ century the village (then known as Bogorodskoe) was part of Bukor-Yurkov volost, Osinsky Uyezd, Perm Governorate.
