= September 12 (Eastern Orthodox liturgics) =

Day in the Eastern Orthodox liturgical calendar

Eastern Orthodox liturgical calendar
September 11	September 12	September 13
September 12 O.S. ≍ September 25 N.S. September 12 N.S ≍ August 30 O.S.

An Eastern Orthodox cross

September 12 in Eastern Orthodox liturgical calendars is a feast day and a day of commemoration of saints and martyrs. Although some Orthodox churches use the Revised Julian Calendar and others use the traditional Julian calendar, the fixed commemorations for their respective September 12 are broadly the same, no matter which calendar is used. (Note: Despite the dates being the same, the days to which they refer typically differ by 13 days. The notation Old Style or O.S. is sometimes used to indicate a date in the traditional Julian Calendar (the "Old Calendar"). The notation New Style or N.S. indicates a date in the Revised Julian calendar (the "New Calendar").)

== Feasts ==
- Apodosis of the Nativity of the Theotokos.

== Saints ==
- Hieromartyr Coronatus, Bishop of Nicomedia at Iconium (249-259) (Note: "At Iconium, in Lycaonia, the holy bishop Curonotus, who received the crown of martyrdom by being beheaded under the governor Perennius.")
- Martyr Theodore of Alexandria. (Note: He has been erroneously identified with Patriarch Theodore I of Alexandria in the Hagiologion.)
- Martyr Oceanus.
- Hieromartyr Autonomus, Bishop, in Italy (313) (Note: "In Bithynia, St. Autonomus, bishop and martyr, who went to that country from Italy to avoid the persecution of Diocletian. After he had converted many to the faith, he was killed at the altar by the furious Gentiles, whilst celebrating the sacred mysteries, and so became the victim of Christ.")
- Martyr Julian of Galatia and 40 martyrs with him (4th century)
- Martyrs Macedonius, Tatian, and Theodulus, in Phrygia (4th century) (Note: "At Merum, in Phrygia, the holy martyrs Macedonius, Theodulus, and Tatian, under Julian the Apostate. After other torments, they joyfully consummated their martyrdom by being laid on burning gridirons by order of the governor Almachius.")
- Venerable Daniel of Thasos, monk, of the island of Thasos (c. 843)
- Venerable Andronicus of Atroa, in Bithynia (9th century)

== Pre-Schism Western saints ==
- Saint Juventius of Pavia, first Bishop of Pavia, Italy (1st century) (Note: The tradition is that St Hermagoras, Bishop of Aquileia and disciple of the Apostle Mark, sent Sts Syrus and Juventius to preach the Gospel in Pavia in Italy where the latter became the first bishop.) (Note: "At Pavia, St. Juventius, bishop, mentioned on the 8th of February. He was sent to that city with St. Cyrus by blessed Hermagoras, disciple of the evangelist St. Mark. They both preached the Gospel of Christ there, and being renowned for great virtues and miracles, illustrated the neighboring cities by divine works. They closed their glorious career in peace, invested with the episcopal dignity.") (see also: February 8)
- Saint Ailbhe of Emly (Albeus, Elvis), first Bishop of Emly, Ireland (527)
- Saint Silvinus, Bishop of Verona in Italy (c. 550)
- Saint Sacerdos of Lyon, Bishop of Lyon in Gaul (551) (Note: He presided over the Council of Orleans in 549.)
- Saint Molaise of Devenish Island (563)
- Saint Eanswythe, Abbess, of Folkestone Priory (c. 640)
- Saint Guy of Anderlecht (Guido), called 'the Poor Man of Anderlecht', Confessor (c. 1012) (Note: He was born in Brabant in Belgium and was sacrist of Our Lady of Laken. Afterwards he lived for seven years in the Holy Land. He returned to Anderlecht near Brussels where he reposed.)

== Post-Schism Orthodox saints ==
- Venerable Athanasius (1401), disciple of St. Sergius of Radonezh and first abbot of the Vysotsky Monastery in Serpukhov, and his disciple Venerable Athanasius (1395) (Note: See: (in Russian) Афанасий Высоцкий Старший. Википедии. (Russian Wikipedia).)
- Venerable Bassian of Tiksna in Vologda (1624-1633)
- Hieromartyr Dositheus, Metropolitan of Tbilisi, Georgia (1795) (Note: See: (in Georgian) დოსითეოზ თბილელი. ვიკიპედიაში. (Georgian Wikipedia).)

=== New martyrs and confessors ===
- New Hieromartyrs Theodore Lebedev, John Prudentov, and Nicholas Zhitov, Priests (1937)
- New Martyr Alexis Voroshin, Fool-for-Christ, of Elnat and Zharki, near Kineshma (1937)

== Other commemorations ==
- Commemoration of the vision and muting of Zechariah.
- Translation of the relics (1704) of Righteous Simeon of Verkhoturye (1642)

== Icon gallery ==
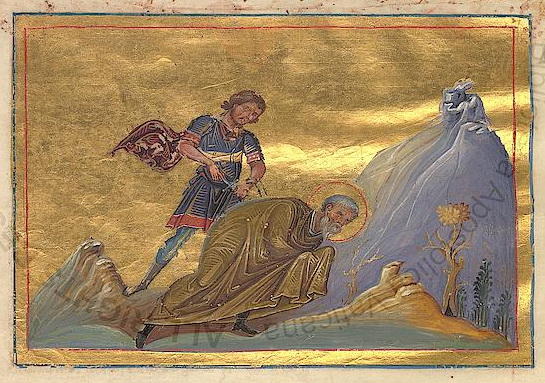
Saint Coronatus, Bishop of Nicomedia, at Iconium.
(Menologion of Basil II, 10th century).

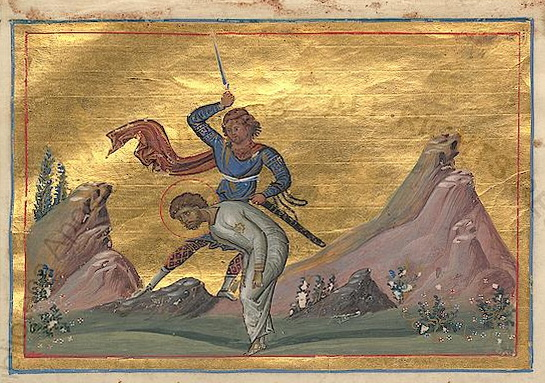
Martyr Theodore of Alexandria.
(Menologion of Basil II, 10th century).

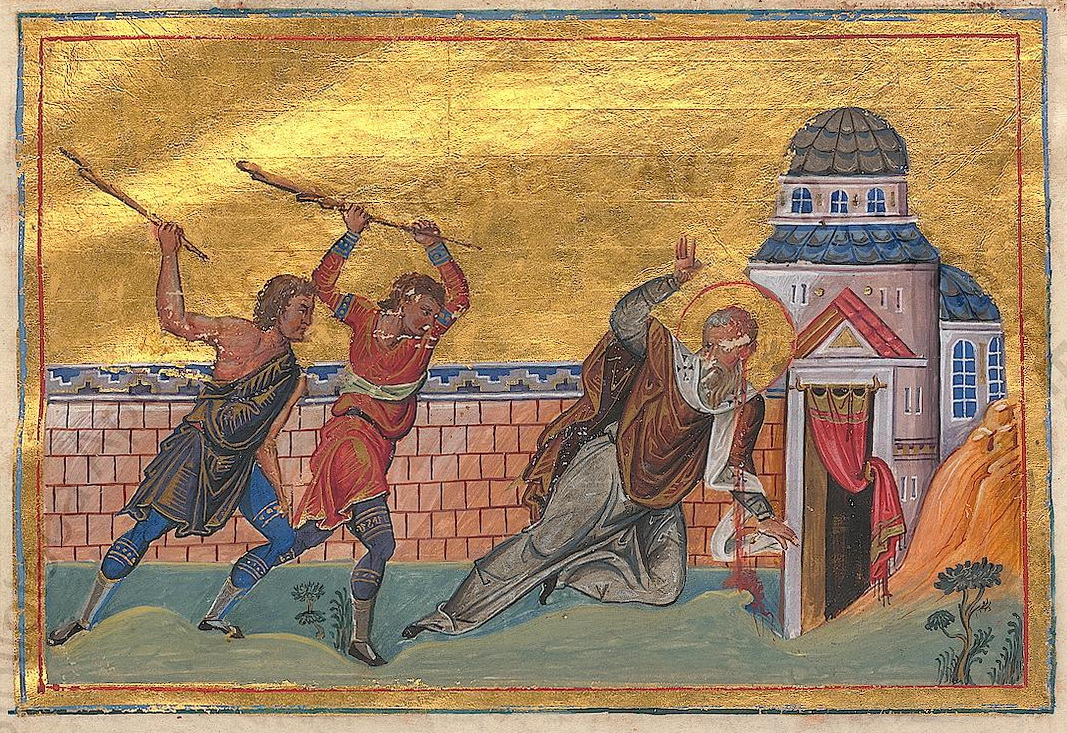
Hieromartyr Autonomus, Bishop, in Italy.
(Menologion of Basil II, 10th century).

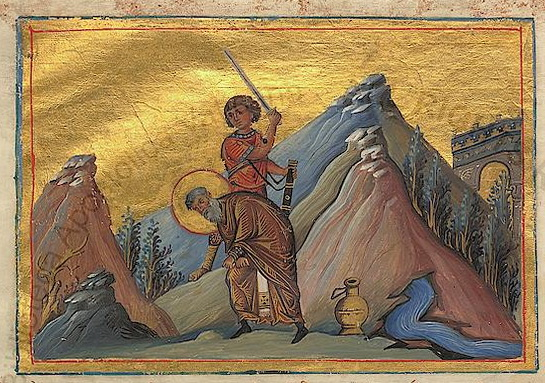
Martyr Julian of Galatia.
(Menologion of Basil II, 10th century).

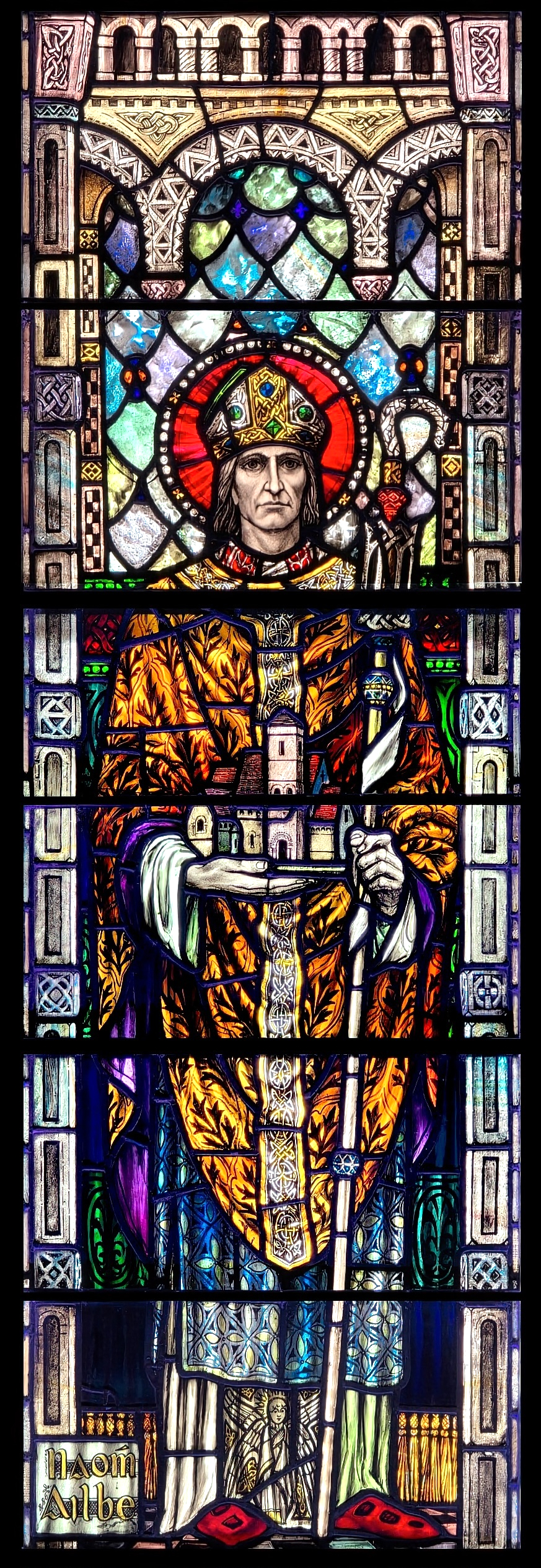
St. Ailbe of Emly.

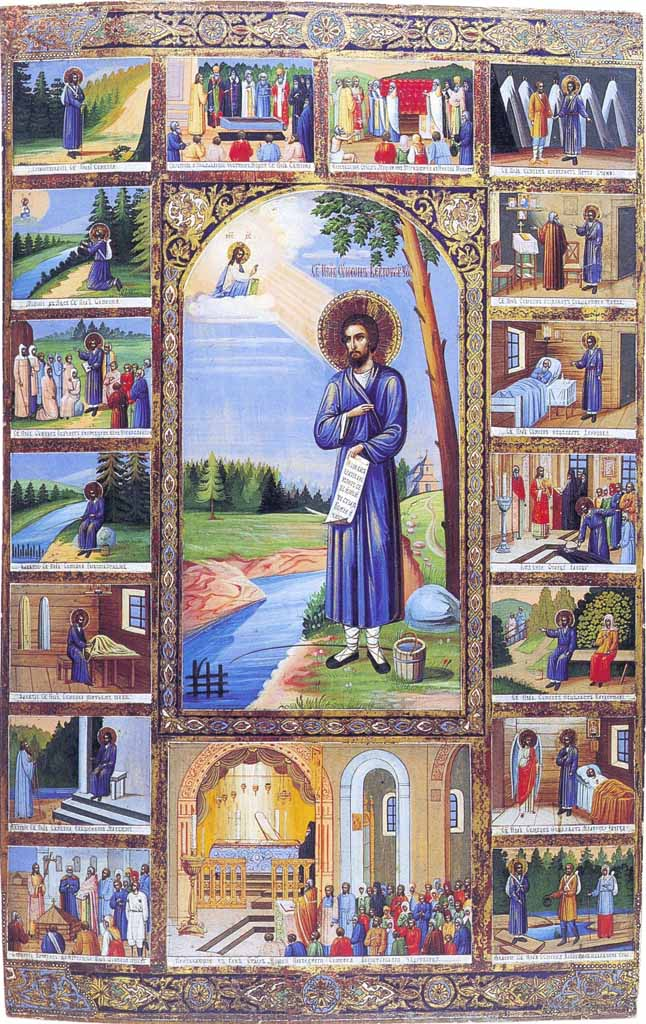
St. Simeon of Verkhoturye.

== Sources ==
- September 12/September 25. Orthodox Calendar (PRAVOSLAVIE.RU).
- September 25 / September 12. HOLY TRINITY RUSSIAN ORTHODOX CHURCH (A parish of the Patriarchate of Moscow).
- September 12. OCA - The Lives of the Saints.
- The Autonomous Orthodox Metropolia of Western Europe and the Americas (ROCOR). St. Hilarion Calendar of Saints for the year of our Lord 2004. St. Hilarion Press (Austin, TX). p. 68.
- The Twelfth Day of the Month of September. Orthodoxy in China.
- September 12. Latin Saints of the Orthodox Patriarchate of Rome.
- The Roman Martyrology. Transl. by the Archbishop of Baltimore. Last Edition, According to the Copy Printed at Rome in 1914. Revised Edition, with the Imprimatur of His Eminence Cardinal Gibbons. Baltimore: John Murphy Company, 1916. pp. 280–281.
- Rev. Richard Stanton. A Menology of England and Wales, or, Brief Memorials of the Ancient British and English Saints Arranged According to the Calendar, Together with the Martyrs of the 16th and 17th Centuries. London: Burns & Oates, 1892. p. 446.

Greek Sources

- Great Synaxaristes: (in Greek) 12 ΣΕΠΤΕΜΒΡΙΟΥ. ΜΕΓΑΣ ΣΥΝΑΞΑΡΙΣΤΗΣ.
- (in Greek) Συναξαριστής. 12 Σεπτεμβρίου. ECCLESIA.GR. (H ΕΚΚΛΗΣΙΑ ΤΗΣ ΕΛΛΑΔΟΣ).
- (in Greek) 12/09/2026. Ορθόδοξος Συναξαριστής.

Russian Sources

- (in Russian) 25 сентября (12 сентября). Православная Энциклопедия под редакцией Патриарха Московского и всея Руси Кирилла (электронная версия). (Orthodox Encyclopedia - Pravenc.ru).
- (in Russian) 12 сентября по старому стилю / 25 сентября по новому стилю. Русская Православная Церковь - Православный церковный календарь на 2026 год.
