= Sergey Nikolsky =

Russian mathematician

- Сергей Никольский
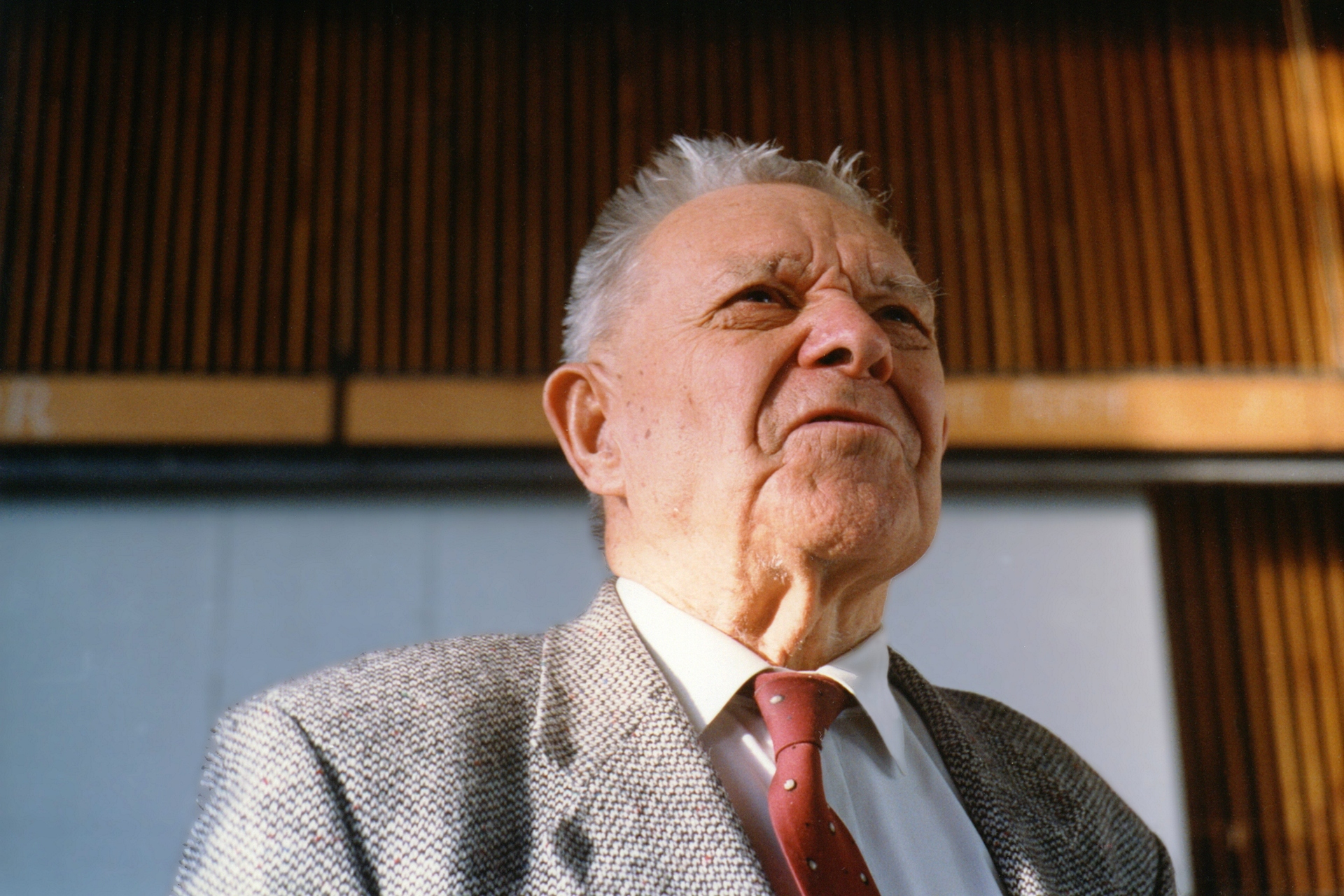
- Nikolsky giving a lecture at MIPT, 1997
- Born: 30 April 1905; Talitsa, Kamyshlovsky Uyezd, Perm Governorate, Russian Empire
- Died: 9 November 2012 (aged 107); Moscow, Russia
- Education: Dnipropetrovsk National University
- Awards: Kolmogorov Prize (2000)
- Scientific career
- Fields: Mathematics
- Workplaces: Moscow State University; Dnipropetrovsk National University; Steklov Institute of Mathematics; MIPT
- Doctoral advisor: Andrey Kolmogorov
- Doctoral students: Oleg Besov

Sergey Mikhailovich Nikolsky (Russian: Сергей Михайлович Никольский; 30 April 1905 – 9 November 2012) was a Soviet and Russian mathematician.

== Biography ==
Nikolsky was born in Talitsa, which was at that time located in Kamyshlovsky Uyezd of the Russian Empire. He had been an Academician since 28 November 1972. He also had won many scientific awards. At the age of 92 he was still actively giving lectures in Moscow Institute of Physics and Technology. In 2005, he was only giving talks at scientific conferences, but was still working in MIPT, at the age of 100. He died in Moscow in November 2012 at the age of 107.

== Scientific activities ==
Nikolsky made fundamental contributions to functional analysis, approximation of functions, quadrature formulas, enclosed functional spaces and their applications to variational solutions of partial differential equations. He created a large scientific school of functions' theory and its applications. He authored over 100 scientific publications, including 3 monographs, 2 college textbooks and 7 school textbooks.

== Selected publications ==
- 1964: Quadrature Formulae, Delhi, Hindustan Publishing
- 1967: (editor): Theory and Applications of Differentiable Functions of Several Variables, American Mathematical Society
- 1975: Course in Mathematical Analysis, 2 vols., Курс математического анализа, Nauka Publishing
- 1975: Approximation of Functions of Several variables and Imbedding Theorems, Springer Verlag (Russian original, Nauka, Moscow 1969)
- 1978,9: (with Valentin Petrovich Ilyin and Oleg Besov) Integral Representation of Functions and Embedding Theorems, 2 vols., Wiley
- 1983: (with Ya. S. Bugrov Differential Equations, Multiple Integrals, Series, Theory of Functions of a Complex Variable, Mir Publishers, Moscow
- 1986: Treatise on the Shift Operator, Springer Verlag (Russian original, Moscow 1980)
- 2002: Operators, Functions and Systems. An easy reading, Volume 1: Hardy, Hankel and Toeplitz, American Mathematical Society
