= Ostrozhka =

Ostrozhka Острожка
- Selo
- Location within Perm Krai Location within Russia
- Coordinates: 57°40′N 55°10′E
- Country: Russia
- Region: Perm Krai
- District: Okhansky District
- Time zone: UTC+5:00

Ostrozhka (Russian: Остро́жка) is a rural locality (a selo) and the administrative center of Ostrozhskoye Rural Settlement, Okhansky District, Perm Krai, Russia. The population was 1,349 as of 2010. There are 32 streets.

== Geography ==
Ostrozhka is located 16 km southwest of Okhansk (the district's administrative centre) by road. Kasyanovo is the nearest rural locality.
