= Krasnoufimsky =

Krasnoufimsky (masculine), Krasnoufimskaya (feminine), or Krasnoufimskoye (neuter) may refer to:

- Krasnoufimsky District, a district of Sverdlovsk Oblast, Russia
  - Krasnoufimsky Urban Okrug, the municipal formation which this district is incorporated as
- Krasnoufimsky Uyezd (1781–1923), an administrative division of Perm Governorate, Russian Empire (and later the Russian SFSR)
