= Simeon of Verkhoturye =

Patron Saint

Saint Simeon of Verkhoturye
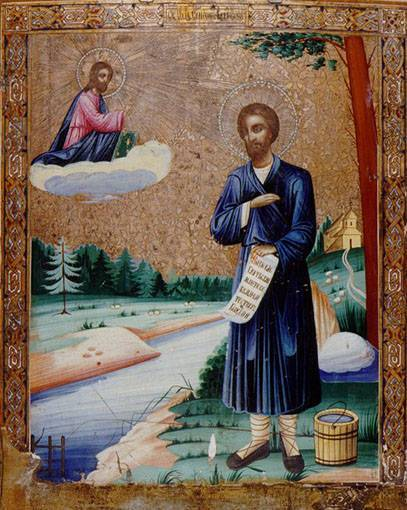

Righteous, Wonderworker
- Born: c. 1607
- Died: 1642
- Venerated in: Eastern Orthodox Church
- Canonized: 1694 by Holy Synod of the Russian Orthodox Church
- Major shrine: relics at the Nikolayevsky Monastery of Verkhoturye part of relics at the Ascension Church of Ekaterinburg and the Assumption cathedral of Ekaterinburg
- Feast: First translation of relics: 12 (25) May Synaxis of All Saints of Siberia: 10 (23) June; Second translation of relics: 12 (25) September; Glorification: 18 (31) December Synaxis of All Saints of Ekaterinburg: 29 January (11 February)
- Patronage: Ural

Simeon of Verkhoturye (Russian: Симеон Верхотурский; 1607–1642), also known as Simeon of Merkushino (Russian: Симеон Меркушинский), is a Russian Orthodox saint. He is the patron saint of the Ural region. The main feast day of Saint Simeon is 18 December (OS), or 31 December (NS).

Believers pray to God asking for Simeon for help, consolation, strengthening, correction, treatment of the soul and body, and delivering from evil. Needy people pray to Simeon to escape from death. Often believers with eye diseases or palsy refer to Simeon for help.

== Biography ==
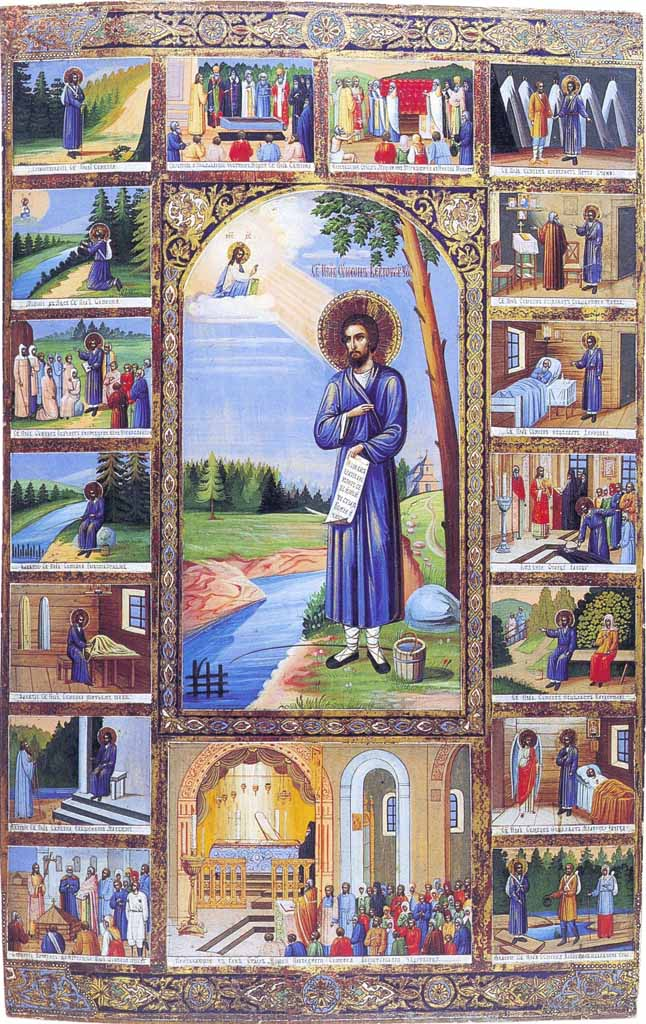
Simeon of Verkhoturye with hagiography

The facts of the life of Simeon are very short and only known through the hagiography compiled by Metropolitan Ignatius (Rimsky-Korsakov) of Tobolsk and Siberia in the late 17th century from stories by his contemporaries, after the priest had examined the translation of the relics of Simeon. The title of the story was "A Story Known and Witnessed on the Manifestation of the Sacred Relics and in Some Measure the Legend of the Holy and Righteous Simeon, the New Siberian Wondermaker".

According to the hagiography, Simeon was born to a noble boyar family in the European part of Russia. After the death of his parents during the Time of Troubles, Simeon moved to the Ural Mountains and settled in the town of Verkhoturye. In 1620, he moved to the village Merkushino (about 53 kilometres (33 mi), from Verkhoturye), in and around which he spent most of the rest of his life, hiding his origin and living simply.(Russian: социальное опрощение).

In Merkushino he visited the local wooden Archangel Michael church. In summer, Simeon cloistered himself for prayers along the bank of the Tura River ten verst (about 10.66 km, or 6.21 miles) from Merkushino, obtaining his living from fishing. In winter he sewed coats for the village peasants of the Verkhotursky Uyezd. He was known for his unselfishness; for example, to ensure he would not be paid for his sewing work, he would leave the garments he had worked on unfinished and then desert the village. Simeon preached humility, and even during his lifetime displayed the asceticism and honesty of a righteous person.

Simeon preached Christianity to the Voguls. He died in Merkushino in 1642 and was buried in a graveyard by the Archangel Michael church.

== Translation of the relics ==
In 1692, the coffin of Simeon miraculously rose from his grave, so that his relics were seen. Local residents regarded it as an indication for sainthood, but they could not recall his name. After that, new cases of miraculous healing seemingly related to Simeon appeared, mainly the healing of skin diseases with earth from his grave. In 1693, the Siberian eparch sent a clerk named Matthew to study the reports of wonders. After contacting metropolitan Ignatius (Rimsky-Korsakov), he was instructed to build a small symbolic cover – a "golubets" – above the grave of Simeon.

On 18 December 1694, at the metropolitan's request, an examination of Simeon's relics and the apparent instances of healing were led by hegumen Isaac of the Dalmatian Monastery and other clerks. Merkushino was visited by the metropolitan a day later, but after listening to Isaac, who said that "an entire body was found at the grove, excluding decaying fingers on one hand and robe, and, according to witnesses, the body smelled pleasant", Ignatius was skeptical. The hagiography tells how, after the metropolitan's eye suffered an injury, he took it as a judgement on his skepticism and himself examined the relics. In the coffin that had been raised from the grave were found bone remains, tightly covered with flesh, and decaying clothes. Ignatius pronounced them as incorruptible, and, according to the hagiography, received a revelation in a dream about the name of the saint, whom he ordered be called "righteous Saint Simeon". On 30 December 1694 Ignatius again visited Merkushino where he examined the relics for a second time. He had them moved to a church and the coffin covered with a silk podea, and ordered that information about Simeon's life be collected. After that, he wrote the hagiography and akathist of Simeon.

== Sainthood ==
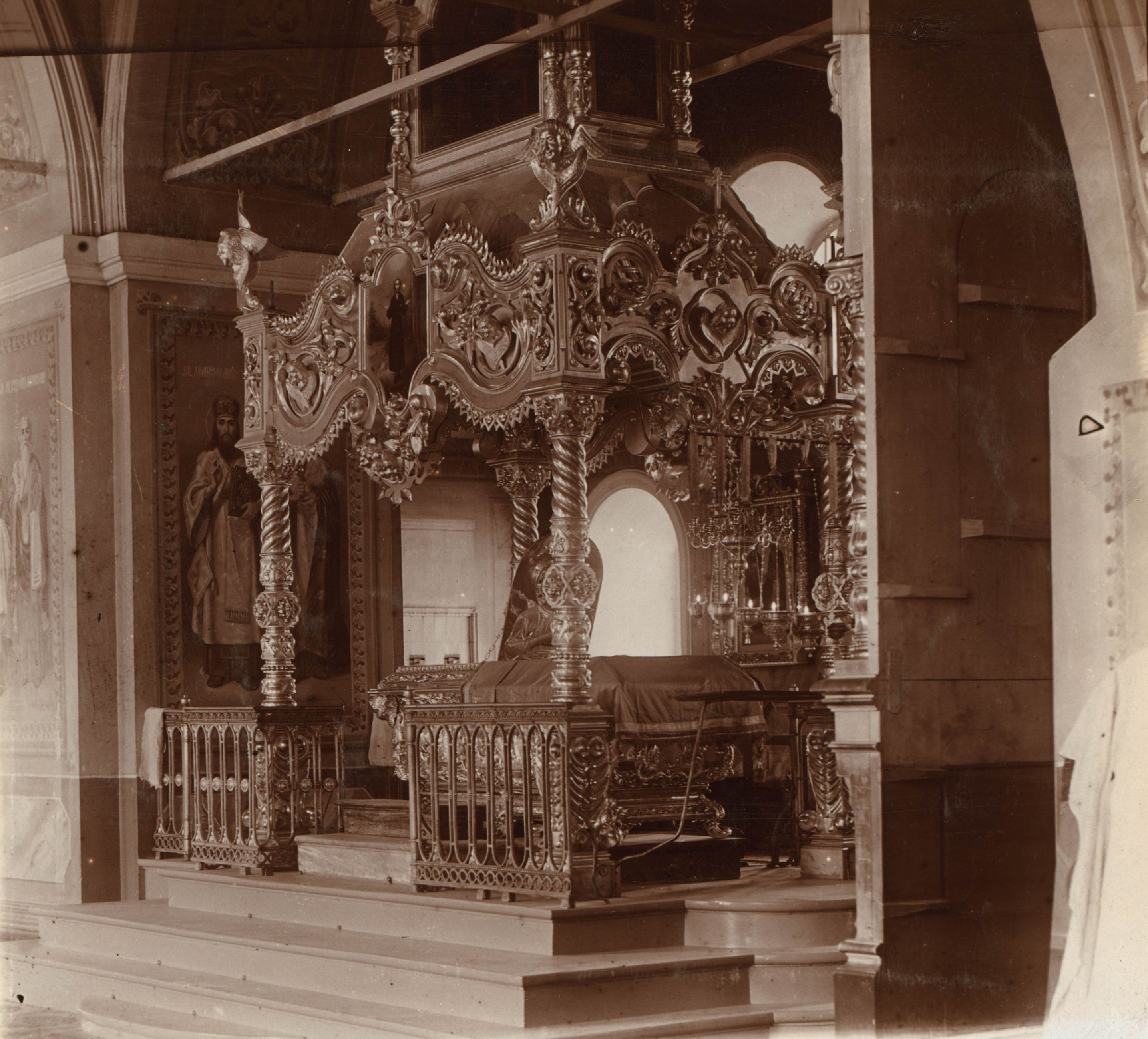
Shrine with relics of Simeon of Verkhoturye at the Nikolayevsky Monastery, 1910

On 12 September 1704, the relics of Simeon were translated to the Nikolayevsky Monastery of Verkhoturye with the blessings of metropolitan Philotheus, and brought to the right-sided kliros of the monastery church. According to a legend, the translation was related to a cross procession, after lame Fool Cosmas prayed and wished to take rest. In 1716, the church was burnt down, but the shrine with the relics was unaffected and in 1838 was placed to the side-altar of Simeon the God-Receiver and Anna the Prophetess, which was renamed in honour of Simeon of Verkhoturye in 1863. The burial place of Simeon in Merkushino, where a spring gushed, was also honoured. The wooden chapel above it was replaced by a new stone chapel in 1808.

The Brotherhood of the Righteous St. Simeon, Wonderworker of Verkhoturye, was founded in Ekaterinburg in 1886 for the enlightenment of people. Members of the brotherhood on the money of the Eparchy, the Synod and volunteers opened schools and supported missionaries. 300 schools, where over 10 thousand pupils learned grammar and God's Law, were maintained by the brotherhood. A missionary foundation was created in 1901 for the support of the disadvantaged and people returning from a schism or a sect.

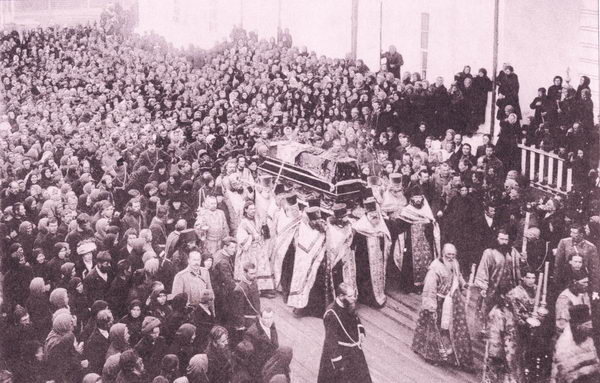
Cross procession with the relics of St. Simeon, 27 May 1914

The relics of Simeon draw many pilgrims to the monastery; in the early 20th century the number of visitors reached 60,000 people in a year. Incidentally, the Exaltation Cathedral was built in the Nikolayevsky Monastery in 1913 to hold eight to ten thousand people. The dedication and the translation of the relics of Simeon took place on 11 September 1913, when the 300th anniversary of the Romanov dynasty was celebrated. That day, a telegram from the Tsar's family arrived from Livadiya: "Verkhoturye. Nikolayevsky Monastery. To the abbot Father Xenophon. I wholeheartedly greet you and the community with this solemn day of dedication of the new church, the cherished monastery and tomorrow's great feast. I seek for your prayers in front of the righteous' shrine. Nicholas. Anastasia". In 1914, the Tsar family donated a silver baldachin for the shrine. It was solemnly moved from Ekaterinburg to Verkhoturye during a cross procession that lasted 20 days. Several thousand pilgrims walked over 350 kilometres (220 mi). On 27 May, the relics of Simeon were translated from the Nikolayevsky church to the Exaltation Cathedral of the Nikolayevsky Monastery.

=== Opening, withdrawal and return of the relics ===
After the October Revolution, the authority of Verkhoturye passed to the Bolsheviks. On 17 August 1918, at the request of the head of the Extraordinary Board of Inquiry, A. V. Saburov, the first public opening of the relics of Simeon took place. Archimandrit Xenophon (Medvedev), abbot of the Nikolayevsky Monastery, conciliated his parish about this sacrilege, and explained that the opening was limited to the removal of the shroud. In September 1918, the town was taken over by Kolchak's army.

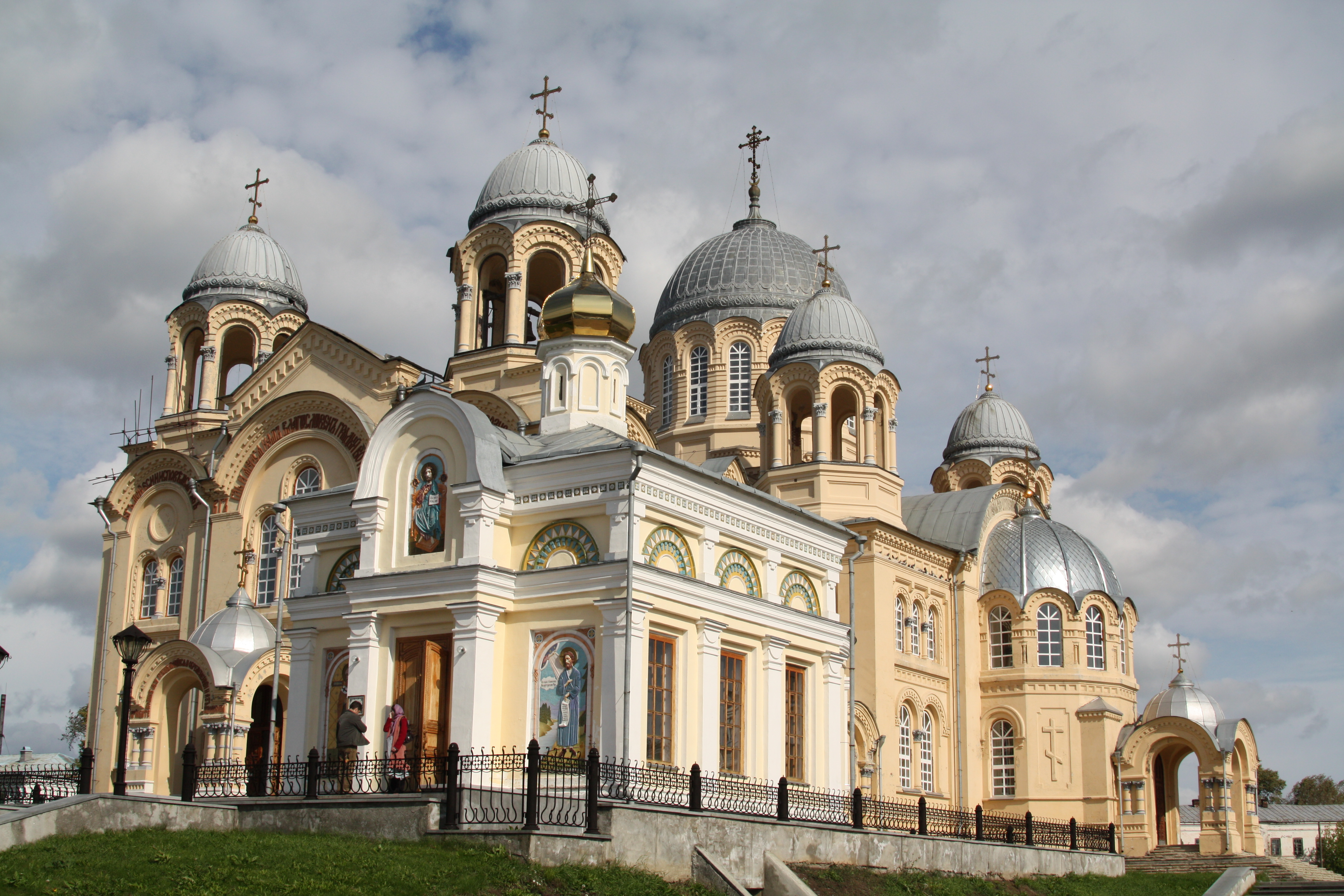
The Exaltation Cathedral of the Nikolayevsky Monastery of Verkhoturye

In June 1919, the White Army began to retreat from Verkhoturye. Archimandrit Xenophon made the decision to evacuate the monks together with the White Guards. The church property and relics, including the one of St. Simeon, were hidden in the monastery and its skete; the monks took only the silver shrine from under the relics. Archmandrite Xenophon could not get far away from the monastery, as he later wrote: "some hooligans of white guards, in spite of my order as archimandrite, took away my horses and left their nags, on which nobody could ride". A group of seven monks headed by hegumen Abercius continued their movement with the shrine, but on the border of the Irbitsky Uyezd they paused at the Krasnoselsky nunnery, as the white guards did not really care about them. In February 1920 they returned with the shrine to Verkhoturye, now under control of the Soviets.

On 25 September 1920, on the feast day of Saint Simeon with over fifteen thousand pilgrims gathered at the monastery, the Soviets opened the shrine with the relics of Simeon as a part of their anti-religious campaign. Archimandrite Xenophon conciliated the outraged believers, explaining that the opening of the relics did not affect their sacredness, and together with the community carried the shrine from the church, opened it and placed the relics on a table. After two hours, the Soviets agreed to return the relics back to the monastery, but the costly shrine was allegedly seized for the hungry. On 2 June 1924, the relics were examined by the Public Health Administration commission, which found the result of the rite unsanitary, so they sealed the shrine and heavily restricted access to it. On 30 May 1929, the relics were seized from the monastery and given to a museum in Nizhny Tagil for anti-religious works. According to the survey, the museum should "reveal the exploitative nature of the Church Fathers by giving a demonstrative insight into the methods of priestlings and monks who spread their religious narcotic into people's mind". The journal Soviet Local Studies reacted in 1935 to the state of the museum exposition:

Poorly formalized is the anti-religious aspect of the museum. When going to the room with the bone fragments of the 'incorruptible' Simeon of Verkhoturye, one involuntarily feels, that he went to some preaching house. Here one can find every church utensil, chandeliers, a huge Evangelium. There is nothing anti-religious about that exhibition.

— Remembers Nina Goncharova, senior staff scientist of the Museum of Local Studies, and the last keeper of the relics of Simeon of Verkhoturye,

After the publication of that material, the director of the museum was arrested to ten years exile, and the relics were given to a Uralian anti-religious museum in Ekaterinburg, located in the Ipatiev House, in late 1935. After the dissolution of the museum funds, the relics were handed over to the store-room of the Regional Museum of Local Studies on 7 October 1946. On 29 September 1947, Tobias (Ostroumov), episcope of Sverdlovsk and Chelyabinsk, sent a letter to the director of the Council for Religious Affairs of the Sverdlovsk Oblast, V. N. Smirnov, requesting the return to the church of the relics of Simeon, but the letter was not answered.

On 11 April 1989, the relics were eventually returned to the Russian Orthodox Church and placed in the Spassky church of Ekaterinburg. On 25 September 1992, most of the relics were transferred to the Nikolayevsky Monastery of Verkhoturye in the restored and newly dedicated Exaltation Cathedral.

== Notes ==
=== References ===
- Житие Святого праведного Симеона Верхотурского [Hagiography of Righteous St. Simeon of Verkhoturye] (in Russian). Moscow. 1885. p. 36.
- Жития Сибирских святых [Hagiographies of Siberian Saints]. Novosibirsk. 2007. pp. 13–32. ISBN 978-5-88013-010-8.
- Предания и легенды Урала [Stories and Legends of the Ural] (in Russian). Sverdlovsk, 1991.
- Святые Древней Руси [Saints of the Ancient Rus' ] (in Russian). G. P. Fedotov. Paris, 1931.
