= September 25 (Eastern Orthodox liturgics) =

Day in the Eastern Orthodox liturgical calendar

Eastern Orthodox liturgical calendar
September 24	September 25	September 26
September 25 O.S. ≍ October 8 N.S. September 25 N.S ≍ September 12 O.S.

An Eastern Orthodox cross

September 25 in Eastern Orthodox liturgical calendars is a feast day and a day of commemoration of saints and martyrs. Although some Orthodox churches use the Revised Julian Calendar and others use the traditional Julian calendar, the fixed commemorations for their respective September 25 are broadly the same, no matter which calendar is used. (Note: Despite the dates being the same, the days to which they refer typically differ by 13 days. The notation Old Style or O.S. is sometimes used to indicate a date in the traditional Julian Calendar (the "Old Calendar"). The notation New Style or N.S. indicates a date in the Revised Julian calendar (the "New Calendar").)

== Saints ==
- Monk-martyr Paphnutius and 546 companions, in Egypt (c. 303) (see also: April 19 )
- Martyrs Paul and Tatta and their children Sabinian, Maximos, Rufus, and Eugene, of Damascus. (Note: "At Damascus, the holy martyr Paul, Tata, his wife, and Sabinian, Maximus, Rufus, and Eugenius, their sons. Accused of professing the Christian religion, they were scourged, and tortured in other ways, until they gave up their souls to God.")
- Venerable Euphrosyne of Alexandria, nun, (Note: Name days celebrated today include: Euphrosyne, Efrosini, Froso (Εὐφροσύνη).) and her father Venerable Paphnutius, monk (5th century)
- Venerable Theophilos the Confessor, Archbishop of Ephesus. (Note: He is not recorded in the Synaxaria. His memory, along with a service dedicated to him, is recorded in Parisian Codex 1619, page 62. In addition his memory is recorded on this day in the Synaxarion of Delahaye.)
- Saint Arsen the Great, Catholicos of Georgia (887) (Note: See: (in Georgian) არსენ I (კათოლიკოსი). ვიკიპედიაში (Georgian Wikipedia).)

== Pre-Schism Western saints ==
- Saints Aurelia and Neomisia, at Anagni, peacefully. (Note: Born in Asia, they visited Palestine and Rome. They were maltreated by pagans in Capua in Italy, but escaped under cover of a thunderstorm. They took shelter in Macerata near Anagni, where they reposed.)
- Saint Herculanus, a soldier martyred in Rome. (Note: "At Rome, under the emperor Antoninus, St. Herculanus, soldier and martyr, who, being converted to Christ by the miracles wrought during the martyrdom of the, blessed bishop Alexander, was put to the sword, after enduring many torments.")
- Saint Firminus of Amiens, First Bishop of Amiens (4th century) (Note: He was born in Pampeluna in Spain and was converted by St Saturninus, Bishop of Toulouse.) (Note: "At Amiens, in France, in the persecution of Diocletian, blessed Firmin, bishop. Under the governor Rictiovarus, after various torments, he suffered martyrdom by being beheaded.")
- Saint Caian of Tregaian (5th century) (Note: A church at Tregaian in Anglesey in Wales is dedicated to him.)
- Saint Principius, the elder brother of St Remigius of Rheims, he became Bishop of Soissons in France (c. 505) (Note: "The same day, St. Principius, bishop of Soissons, brother of the blessed bishop Remigius.")
- Saint Solemnis (Soleine, Solen), Bishop of Chartres (511) (Note: "At Blois, St. Solemnius, bishop of Chartres, renowned for miracles.")
- Saint Lupus of Lyon, Archbishop of Lyon (542) (Note: A monk at a monastery near Lyon in France who became Archbishop there. He suffered much in the troubles which followed the death of St Sigismund, King of Burgundy.) (Note: "At Lyon, the decease of St. Lupus, at one time an anchoret, but later a bishop.")
- Saint Anacharius (Aunacharius, Aunachaire, Aunaire), Bishop of Auxerre and Confessor (604) (Note: Born near Orleans in France and educated at the court of King Guntram of Burgundy, he became Bishop of Auxerre in 561.)
- Saint Finbarr of Cork (Barrocus, Barry), first Bishop of Cork (c. 633)
- Saint Ermenfridus, a monk at Luxeuil Abbey in France, who later founded the monastery of Cusance (c. 670)
- Saint Mewrog, a saint in Wales.
- Saint Fymbert, a bishop in the west of Scotland (7th century)
- Saint Ceolfrith (Ceolfrid, Geoffrey), Abbot, of Wearmouth-Jarrow Monastery (716) (Note: A Northumbrian who became a monk at Gilling in Yorkshire in England. From here he went to Ripon and later to Wearmouth. Eventually he became Abbot of Wearmouth-Jarrow for twenty-six years. He is remembered for inspiring St Bede and also producing the Codex Amiatinus, the oldest surviving copy of the Vulgate in one complete volume. He reposed at Langres in France on his way to Rome.)
- Saint Egelred, a monk at Crowland Abbey in England, martyred with his abbot and many others by the heathen Danes (c. 869)

== Post-Schism Orthodox saints ==
- Saint Byzantinos. (Note: His name does not appear in the Synaxaria. He is recorded in the Jerusalemitic Canonarion, published by Archimandrite Kallistos, on page 112.)
- Venerable Euphrosyne of Suzdal, nun (1250) (Note: See: (in Russian) Евфросиния Суздальская. Википедии. (Russian Wikipedia).)
- Repose of Venerable Sergius of Radonezh, Abbot of Radonezh and Wonderworker of All Russia (1392)
- Saint Pimen (Cherny), archbishop of Novgorod (1571)
- Saint Dosithea the Recluse, of the Kiev Caves (1776) (Note: See: (in Russian) Досифея Киевская. Википедии. (Russian Wikipedia).) (Note: A monastic woman who took up her struggle "in the guise of a man", and who blessed Saint Seraphim to go to Sarov.)

=== New martyrs and confessors ===
- Saint Nicholas Rozov the Confessor, Priest (1941)

== Other commemorations ==
- Commemoration of the earthquake in Constantinople in 447, when a boy was lifted up to heaven and heard the "Trisagion". (see also: January 26)
- First translation of the relics (1595) of St. Herman, Archbishop of Kazan (1567) (Note: St Herman is also commemorated on November 6 (his repose) and June 23 (second transfer of his relics in 1714).)
- Repose of philosopher Alexei Stepanovich Khomiakov, cofounder of the Slavophile movement (1860) (Note: The Slavophile movement drew on the works of Greek patristics and Russian poets and literary critics to reinforce Orthodox Christian values and Slavic cultural traditions, denouncing "westernizations" by Peter the Great and Catherine the Great, and stressing Russian mysticism over Western rationalism. See: Joseph L. Wieczynski. Khomyakov's Critique of Western Christianity. Church History. Vol.38, No.3, September 1969. pp. 291-299.)
- Uncovering of the relics of hieromartyrs Alexander Smirnov and Theodore Remizov, Presbyters (1985)

== Icon gallery ==
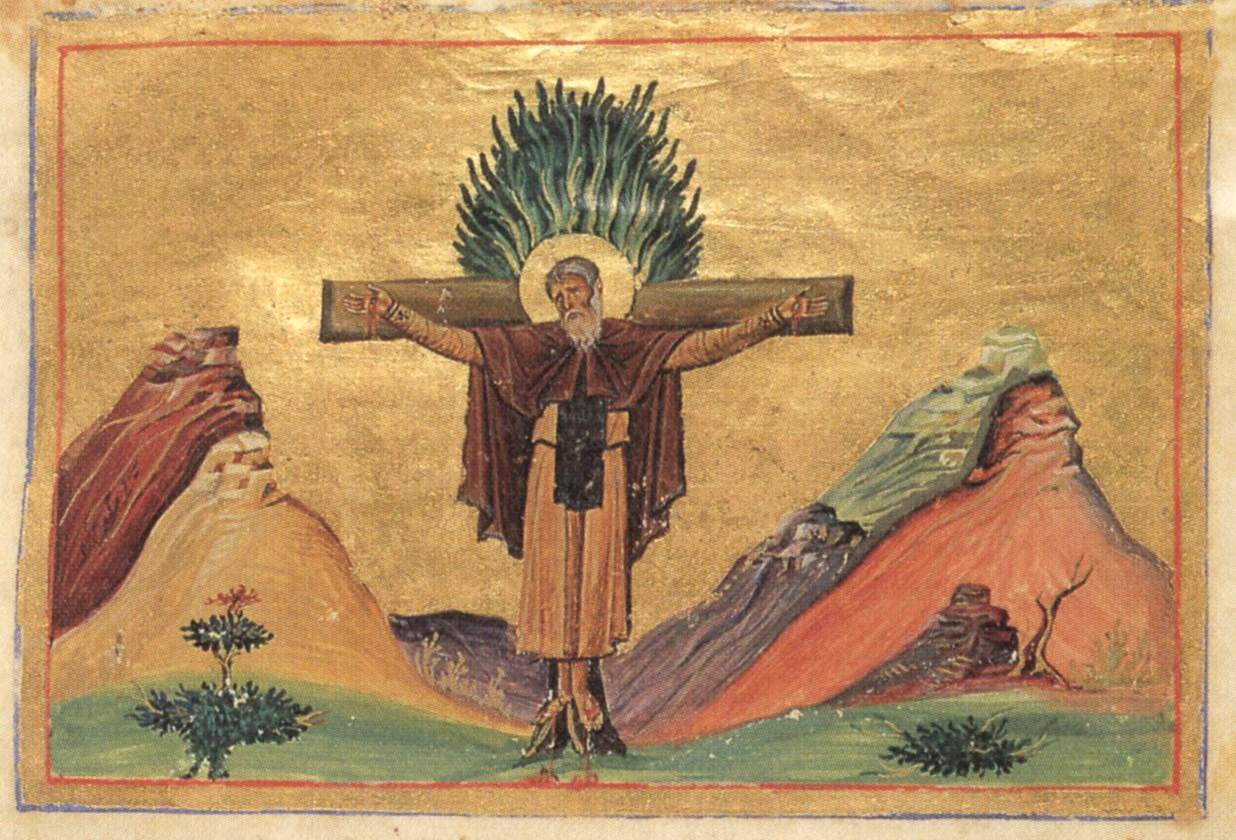
Monk-martyr Paphnutius, crucified.
(Menologion of Basil II, 10th century).

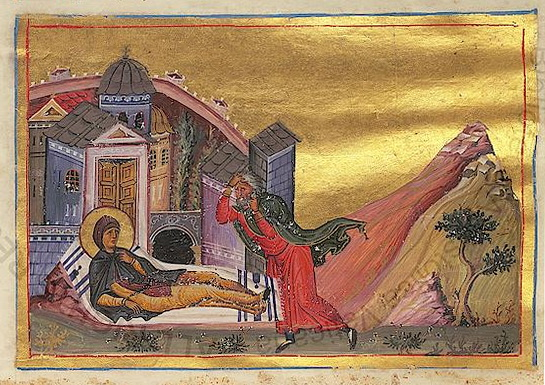
Venerable Euphrosyne of Alexandria.
(Menologion of Basil II, 10th century).

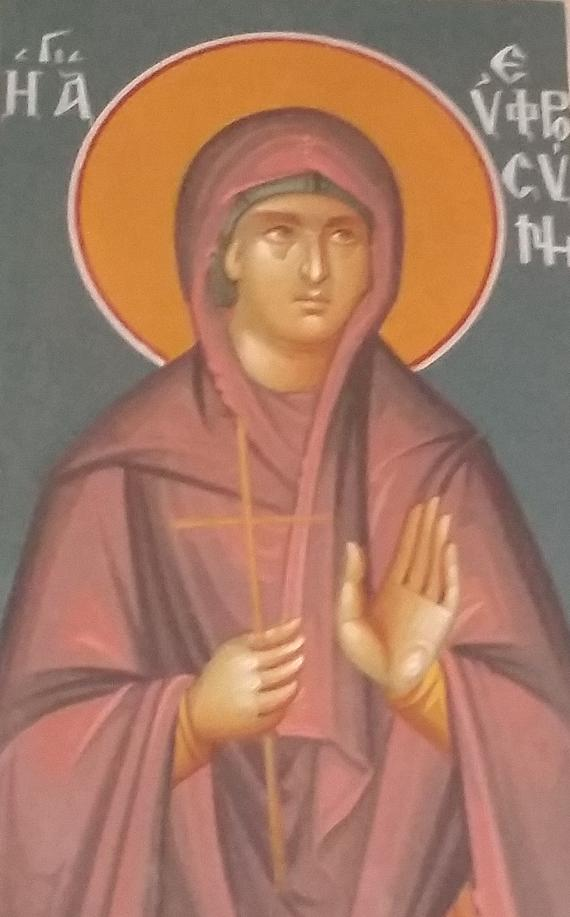
Venerable Euphrosyne of Alexandria.

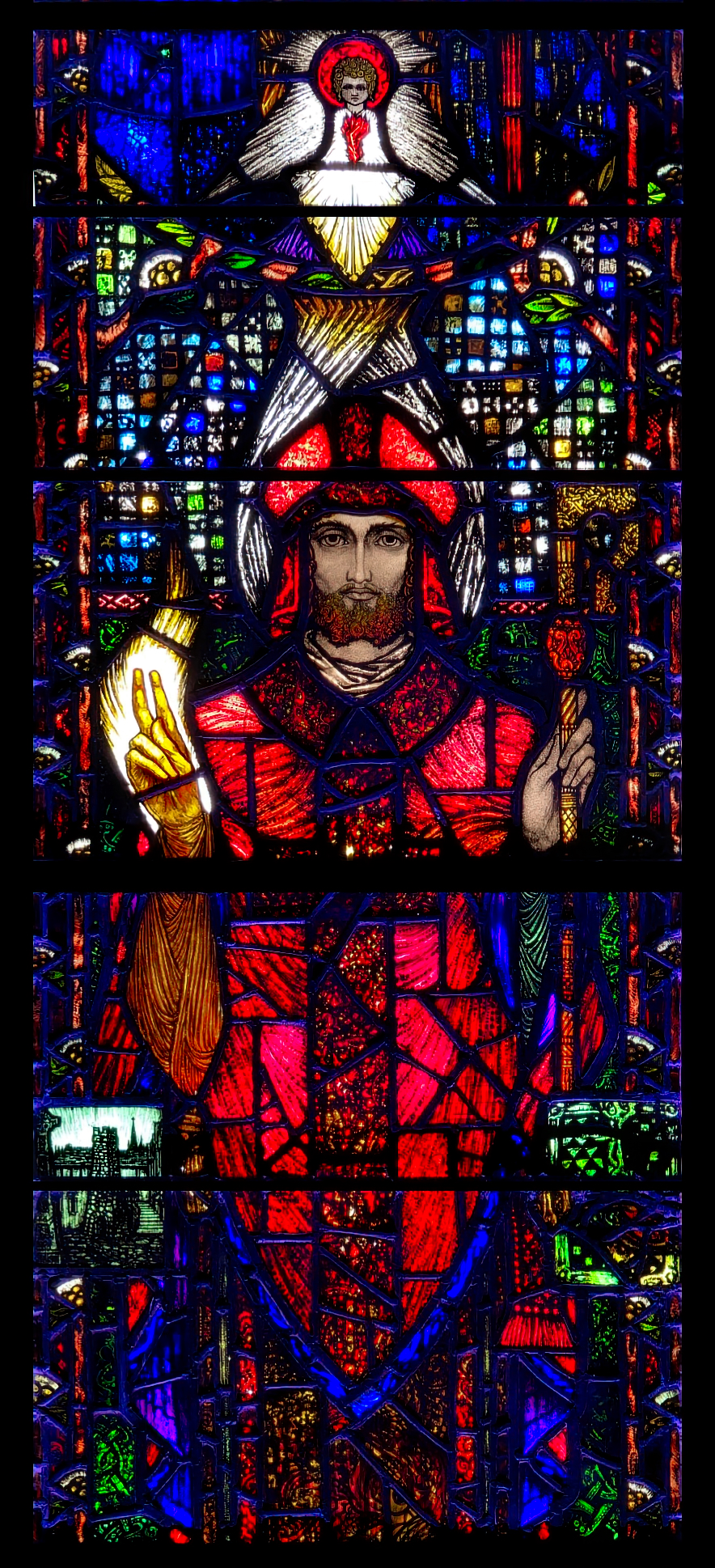
St. Finbarr of Cork, first Bishop of Cork.

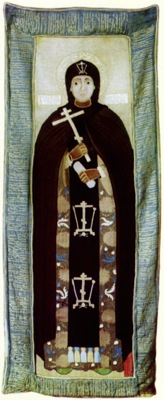
Venerable Euphrosyne of Suzdal.

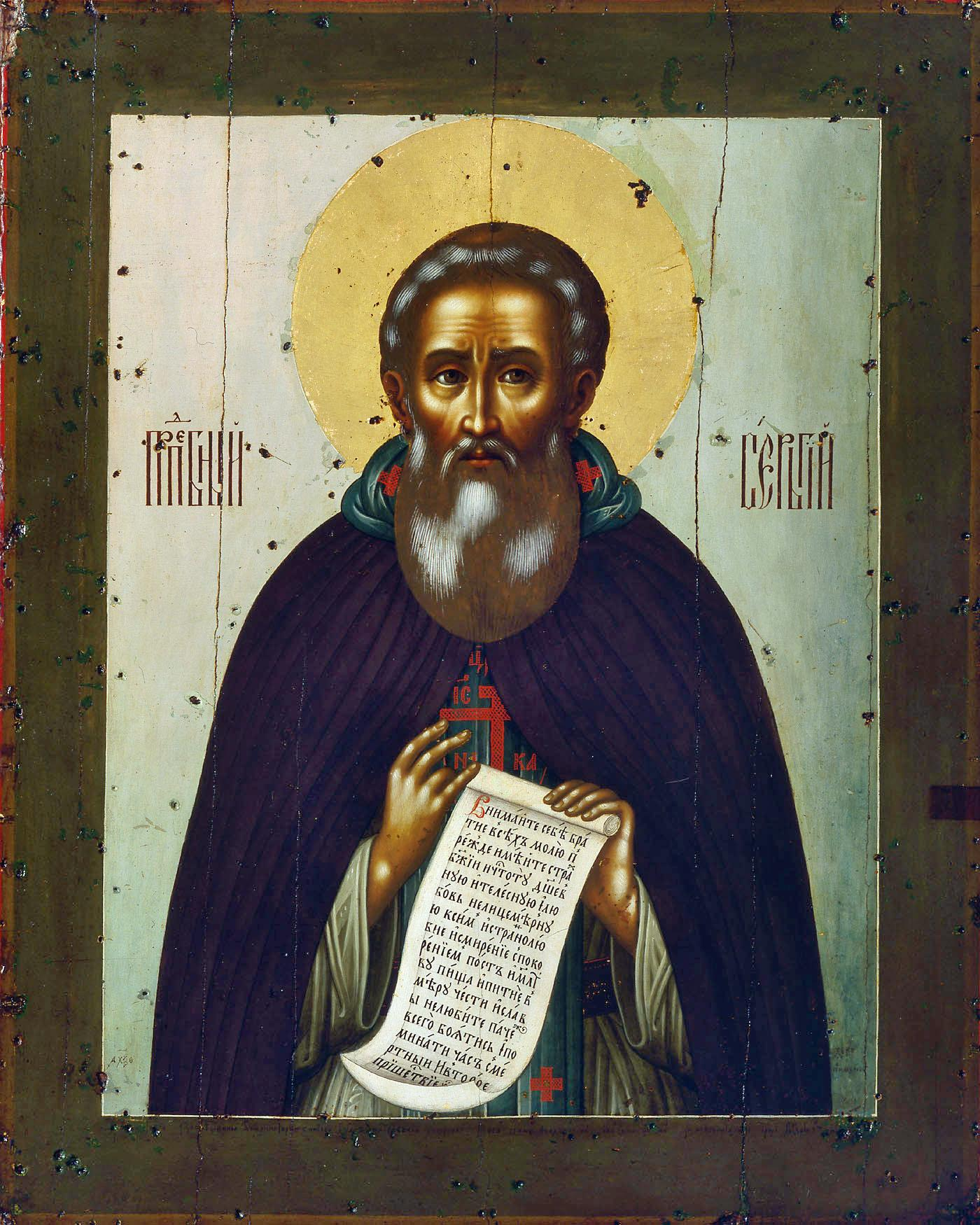
Venerable Sergius of Radonezh, Abbot of Radonezh and Wonderworker of All Russia.

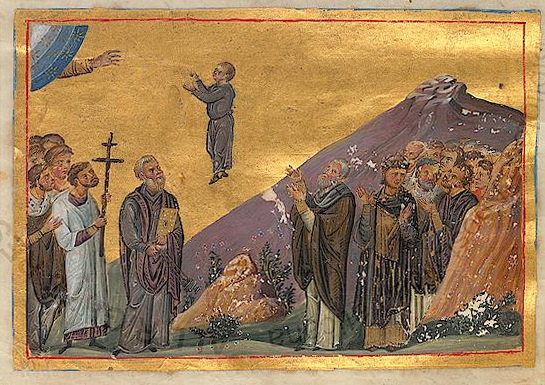
Commemoration of earthquake in Constantinople in 447, and the miracle of the revalation of the "Trisagion" Hymn, when a boy was raptured up to heaven.
(Menologion of Basil II, 10th century).

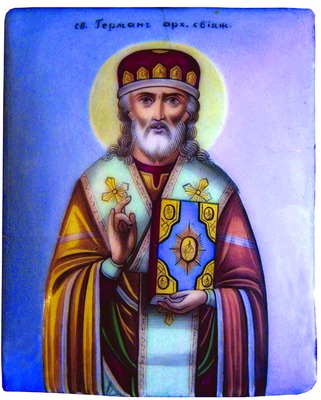
St. Herman, Archbishop of Kazan.

== Sources ==
- September 25/October 8. Orthodox Calendar (PRAVOSLAVIE.RU).
- October 8 / September 25. HOLY TRINITY RUSSIAN ORTHODOX CHURCH (A parish of the Patriarchate of Moscow).
- September 25. OCA - The Lives of the Saints.
- The Autonomous Orthodox Metropolia of Western Europe and the Americas (ROCOR). St. Hilarion Calendar of Saints for the year of our Lord 2004. St. Hilarion Press (Austin, TX). pp. 71–72.
- The Twenty-Fifth Day of the Month of September. Orthodoxy in China.
- September 25. Latin Saints of the Orthodox Patriarchate of Rome.
- The Roman Martyrology. Transl. by the Archbishop of Baltimore. Last Edition, According to the Copy Printed at Rome in 1914. Revised Edition, with the Imprimatur of His Eminence Cardinal Gibbons. Baltimore: John Murphy Company, 1916. pp. 296–297.
- Rev. Richard Stanton. A Menology of England and Wales, or, Brief Memorials of the Ancient British and English Saints Arranged According to the Calendar, Together with the Martyrs of the 16th and 17th Centuries. London: Burns & Oates, 1892. pp. 457–459.

Greek Sources

- Great Synaxaristes: (in Greek) 25 ΣΕΠΤΕΜΒΡΙΟΥ. ΜΕΓΑΣ ΣΥΝΑΞΑΡΙΣΤΗΣ.
- (in Greek) Συναξαριστής. 25 Σεπτεμβρίου. ECCLESIA.GR. (H ΕΚΚΛΗΣΙΑ ΤΗΣ ΕΛΛΑΔΟΣ).
- (in Greek) 25/09/2016. Ορθόδοξος Συναξαριστής.

Russian Sources

- (in Russian) 8 октября (25 сентября). Православная Энциклопедия под редакцией Патриарха Московского и всея Руси Кирилла (электронная версия). (Orthodox Encyclopedia - Pravenc.ru).
- (in Russian) 25 сентября по старому стилю / 8 октября по новому стилю. Русская Православная Церковь - Православный церковный календарь на 2016 год.
