= 1780 in Russia =

The events that occurred in the year 1780 in Russia

== Incumbents ==
- Monarch – Catherine II

== Events ==
- Catherine II issues a Declaration of Armed Neutrality, leading to the founding of the First League of Armed Neutrality
- Kharkov Governorate formed
- Perm Governorate formed
  - Kungursky Uyezd - administrative division of Perm Governate established
  - Osinsky Uyezd - administrative division of Perm Governate established
- Ministry of Finance (Russia)

== Births ==
- 18 February [O.S 7 February] Alexey Venetsianov, (d. 1847) — painter
- 3 July [O.S 21 June] Vasily Narezhny, (d. 1825) — writer
- 1780 Mikhail Petrovich Dolgorukov, (d. 1808) — prince, general
- 1780 Samson Makintsev, (d. 1849 or 1853) — Sergeant

== Deaths ==
- Fyodor Soimonov (1692 – July 22, 1780): A hydrographer, navigator, and explorer of the Caspian Sea. Serving as a Vice-Admiral in the Imperial Russian Navy and as the Governor of Siberia.
- Andrey Yakovlevich Bezborodko (1711 – March 2, 1780): A high-ranking state official and member of the prominent Bezborodko noble family.
