= Timyata =

Timyata Тимята
- Village
- Location within Perm Krai Location within Russia
- Coordinates: 57°34′N 57°28′E
- Country: Russia
- Region: Perm Krai
- District: Beryozovsky District

Population
  - Total: 11
- Time zone: UTC+5:00

Timyata (Russian: Тимята) is a rural locality (a village) in Klyapovskoye Rural Settlement, Beryozovsky District, Perm Krai, Russia. The population was 11 as of 2010.

== Geography ==
The village is located in the southeastern part of Perm Krai, within the Kungur-Krasnoufimskaya forest-steppe. It is situated on the banks of the Taz River, which is a right tributary of the Sylva River, and is approximately 10 kilometers southeast of the district center, Berezovka.

The climate in Timyata is characterized as temperate continental, with long, snowy, cold winters and short, moderately warm summers. The average annual rainfall is between 500 and 550 millimeters, and the average annual snow cover height reaches 70 centimeters. This climate is typical for the region and allows for a variety of vegetation to grow in the area.
