= Stepan Shchipachev =

Soviet Russian poet (1898–1980)

- Степан Петрович Щипачёв
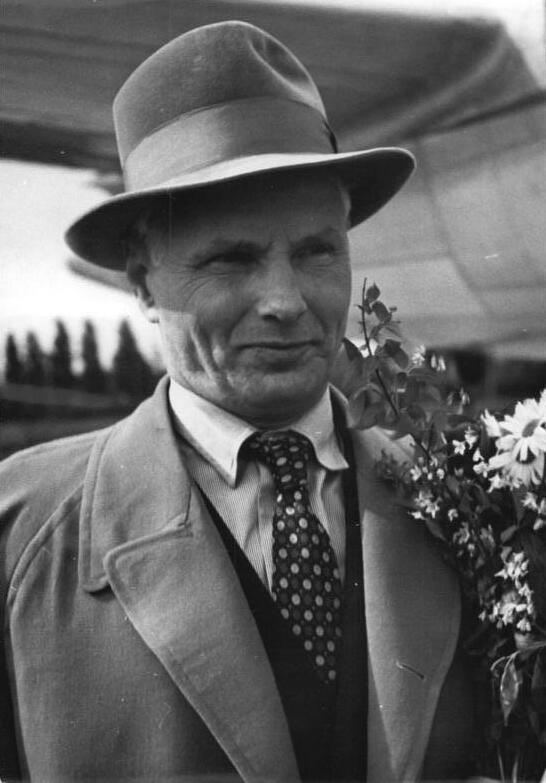
- Shchipachev in 1952
- Born: 26 December [O.S. 14 December] 1898; Schipachy, Kamyshlovsky Uyezd, Russian Empire
- Died: 1 January 1980 (aged 80); Moscow, Soviet Union
- Education: Institute of Red Professors
- Occupation: Poet
- Writing career
- Notable awards: Stalin Prize, Order of Lenin, Order of the Red Banner of Labour, Order of Friendship of Peoples, Order of the Red Star, Jubilee Medal "In Commemoration of the 100th Anniversary of the Birth of Vladimir Ilyich Lenin", Medal "For the Defence of Moscow", Medal "For the Victory over Germany in the Great Patriotic War 1941–1945", Jubilee Medal "Twenty Years of Victory in the Great Patriotic War 1941–1945", Jubilee Medal "Thirty Years of Victory in the Great Patriotic War 1941–1945", Medal "In Commemoration of the 800th Anniversary of Moscow"
- Movement: Socialist realism

Stepan Petrovich Schipachev (Russian: Степа́н Петро́вич Щипачёв; 7 January 1898 – 1 January 1980) was a Russian and later Soviet poet. He is best known for the poem Lines of Love and poetry collections Musings (1962), A Man's Hand (1964), and Selected Works (1965).

He was engaged in literary activity from 1919, after he became a member of the Communist Party and enlisting in the Red Army. He published more than 20 poetry collections. Many of his verses were published in the periodical press. His themes include reflection on nature and on romantic love, however he was primarily known for his lyrics on social subjects (what in Russian poetical tradition is called гражданская лирика).

Schipachev was a member of the board of the Union of Soviet Writers and head of its poets section.

Poet Yevgeny Yevtushenko claims that in 1960 Shchipachev actively opposed the ban for Yevtushenko travelling abroad. Shchipachev signed a famous letter from a group of Soviet writers that was published in Pravda on August 31, 1973, in which they condemned writer Aleksandr Solzhenitsyn and nuclear physicist Andrei Sakharov.

He was buried at the Kuntsevo Cemetery.

The Literary Museum of Stepan Shchipachev was established in 1993, dedicated to life and works of the Soviet poet.
