= Coat of arms of Perm =

Official municipal coat of arms of Perm, Russia

- Adopted: 9 June 1998
- Shield: Gules, a bear passant argent with Bible or resting above and an eight-pointed star argent at the honour point

The coat of arms of Perm (Russian: Герб Перми) is the official municipal coat of arms of Perm, Russia. The current design, adopted on 9 June 1998, features a red field with a silver bear with a yellow Bible resting on its back and a white four-pointed star above. The design is very similar to the coat of arms of Perm Krai.

Several different designs have served as the arms of the city. The first coat of arms was adopted in 1783 and was changed in 1969, during Soviet times. The current coat of arms is a modified version of the 1783 coat of arms.

== Design and symbolism ==
The bear symbolizes the abundance of animals that live in the area's forests. It is colored silver to symbolize natural resources, such as metal, salt, marble, and other stones, that can be found in the area of the city. The bear holds a special significance for Komi peoples, who lived in the area. Tales, songs, and legends were written about the creature. Fangs and claws were worn by hunters as amulets and special holidays were celebrated to honour the bear. The Bible symbolizes the Christian enlightenment of the city around the time that Russian Orthodoxy was becoming more popular. The silver four-pointed star represents the Sun and symbolizes protection and victory. The red field symbolizes the city's status as the capital of Perm Krai. This symbolism can also be found in the coat of arms of Moscow and Saint Petersburg.

== History ==
=== First coat of arms ===
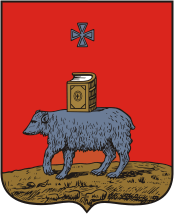
First coat of arms, used from 1783 until 1969

The first coat of arms was adopted on 17 July 1783, by decree of Catherine II. It featured a silver bear on a red field, with a gold Bible on its back and a silver four-pointed star above. The bear symbolizes the savagery of inhabitants prior to Christian enlightenment, which is represented by the Bible.

The bear and Bible design dates back to the times of Alexis of Russia, who used it as an emblem when he was Tsar. Francisco Santi is listed as the author of the emblem. The Perm Governorate submitted a draft of the coat of arms to the Senate in the mid-18th century, which featured the same design, topped with a crown.

=== Second coat of arms ===
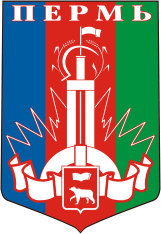
Second coat of arms, used from 1969 until 1998

In 1967, during Soviet rule, Perm City Council announced a competition for a new coat of arms, which continued through 1968. The winner was announced on 25 September 1969. It very much featured elements commonly found in heraldry for Soviet cities. The Bible was replaced by a generic open book and elements of the city's industry could be found throughout the flag. A modified version of the coat of arms, minus the silver star, was shrunk and placed near the bottom of the shield, representing the city's history. The shield itself was a vertical tricolour of red, blue, and green. The red and blue meant that it was a part of Russia, the blue and green represented the natural resources of the area, like its rivers and forests. The center of the shield depicts a monument to the Russian Revolution in Motovilikhinsky. A golden glow surrounds most of the emblem's design, representing the city's highly developed electrical and mechanical engineering industries.

=== Third coat of arms ===
On 23 December 1993, the city restored the historical coat of arms and on 9 June 1998 the current coat of arms, which is a modified version of the 1782 coat of arms, was adopted.
