= Cherdynsky Uyezd =

Administrative division of Perm Governorate, Russian Empire

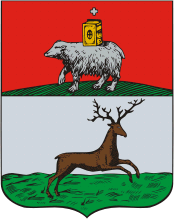
Coat of arms of Cherdyn

Cherdynsky Uyezd (Russian: Чердынский уезд) was an administrative division of Perm Governorate, Russian Empire, which existed until 1923. Its administrative center was town of Cherdyn. Area: 70,790 km². Population according to the 1897 Census: 105,791 (male:51,868; female: 53,923). Of these 73.1% spoke Russian, 25.4% Komi-Permyak, 1.1% Komi-Zyrian, 0.3% Tatar and 0.1% Mansi as their first language.

== Sources ==
- Энциклопедический словарь Брокгауза и Ефрона: В 86 томах (82 т. и 4 доп.). — СПб., 1890—1907.
