= Oleg Besov =

Russian mathematician

- Born: 1933 (age 92–93); Moscow, Russia
- Education: Steklov Institute of Mathematics
- Known for: Besov space Besov measure
- Awards: USSR State Prize (1977)
- Scientific career
- Fields: Mathematics
- Workplaces: Steklov Institute of Mathematics, Moscow Institute of Physics and Technology
- Thesis: On a family of functional spaces: embedding and extension theorems (1960)
- Doctoral advisor: Sergey Nikolsky

Oleg Vladimirovich Besov (Russian: Олег Владимирович Бесов; born 1933) is a Russian mathematician. He heads the Department of Function Theory at the Steklov Institute of Mathematics, where he defended his PhD in 1960 and habilitation in 1966. He was an Invited Speaker at the ICM in 1970 in Nice. He is professor at the Moscow Institute of Physics and Technology and a member of the Russian Academy of Sciences (since 1990) and European Academy of Sciences (since 2002). A festschrift was published in honor of Besov's 70th birthday.

== See also ==
- Besov space

== Selected publications ==
- with Valentin Petrovich Ilʹin and Sergeĭ Mikhaĭlovich Nikolʹskiĭ: Integral representations of functions and imbedding theorems. Vol. 1. V. H. Winston & Sons, 1978. Vol. 2, 1979.
