= Okhansky Uyezd =

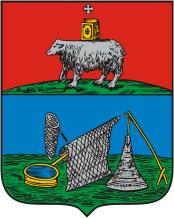
Coat of Arms of Okhansk

Okhansky Uyezd (Russian: Оханский уезд) was an administrative division (uyezd) of Perm Governorate, which existed until 1923. Administrative center was the town of Okhansk. Area: 14,280.17 km^{2}.

== Demographics ==
At the time of the Russian Empire Census of 1897, Okhansky Uyezd had a population of 268,390. Of these, 99.7% spoke Russian and 0.2% Tatar as their native language.
