= Irbitsky Uyezd =

Irbitsky Uyezd (Ирбитский уезд) was one of the subdivisions of the Perm Governorate of the Russian Empire. It was situated in the southeastern part of the governorate. Its administrative centre was Irbit.

== Demographics ==
At the time of the Russian Empire Census of 1897, Irbitsky Uyezd had a population of 159,068. Of these, 98.1% spoke Russian, 1.1% Tatar, 0.2% Bashkir, 0.2% Mansi, 0.1% Yiddish and 0.1% Komi-Zyrian as their native language.
