= Vsevolod Lebedintsev =

Russian astronomer and revolutionary

Vsevolod Vladimirovich Lebedintsev
- Всеволод Владимирович Лебединцев
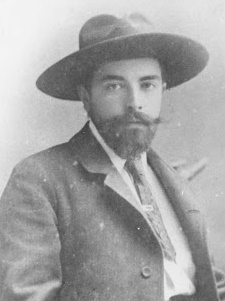
- Born: July 5, 1881
- Died: February 17, 1908 (aged 26)
- Occupation(s): Astronomer and revolutionary

Vsevolod Vladimirovich Lebedintsev (Russian: Всеволод Владимирович Лебединцев; 5 July 1881 – 17 February 1908) was a Russian astronomer and revolutionary. He is primarily known today for his participation in a failed plot in 1908 to assassinate Ivan Shcheglovitov, the Russian Minister of Justice, for which he was tried and executed. He was the inspiration behind the character Werner in Leonid Andreyev's short story "The Seven Who Were Hanged".

In 1904 he was hired at the Pulkovo Observatory.
