= Euphrosyne of Alexandria =

5th-century Egyptian saint

Saint Euphrosyne of Alexandria
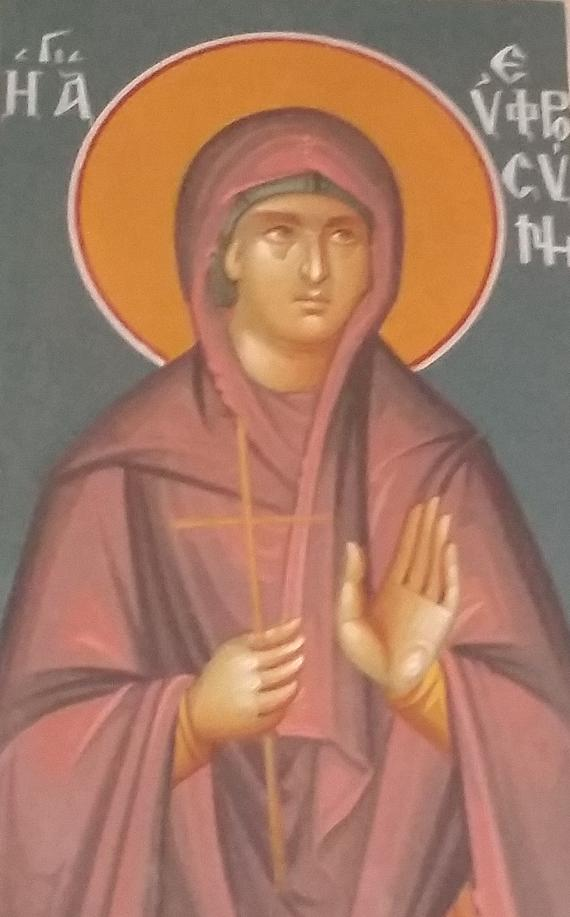
- Fresco of Saint Euphrosyne in a Greek Orthodox Church

Virgin
- Born: 410; Alexandria, Egypt
- Died: 470
- Venerated in: Eastern Orthodox Church; Catholic Church; Anglican Communion
- Feast: September 25, January 16

Euphrosyne of Alexandria (Greek: Ἁγία Εὐφροσύνη tr. "good cheer", 410–470), also called Euphrosynē, was a saint who disguised herself as a male to enter a monastery and live, for 38 years, as an ascetic. Her feast day is celebrated on September 25 by the Greek Orthodox Church and Byzantine Rite Catholics, on September 27 by the Episcopal Church, and on January 16 by the Roman Catholic Church.

Euphrosyne was purportedly born to a wealthy family in Alexandria. When she was 18, her father wanted her to marry, so she escaped, disguised as a man, and entered a monastery. She spent most of her years as a monk in seclusion from the other monks. During the final year of her life, Euphrosyne became her father's spiritual director, comforting his grief over losing his only daughter. Eventually, she revealed her identity to him and they reconciled. After she died, he entered her monastery and became an ascetic himself, living in her cell until he died ten years later. Ecclesiastical historian Johann Peter Kirsch considered her story a legend.

== Life ==
According to Johann Peter Kirsch in the Catholic Encyclopedia, "Her story belongs to that group of legends which relate how Christian virgins, in order the more successfully to lead the life of celibacy and asceticism to which they had dedicated themselves, put on male attire and passed for men".

Euphrosyne was born in 410, into a wealthy and illustrious family in Alexandria, the only daughter of Paphnutius, "a deeply believing and pious Christian". Paphnutius and his wife were having difficulty having children, so he went to a local monastery, which he visited often, and requested that the abbot, who was his spiritual advisor, and monks pray for them; Euphrosyne was born shortly afterwards. She was baptized at the age of seven, educated in the scriptures, and was well known for her wisdom and love of learning.

When Euphrosyne was twelve, her mother died and her father raised her alone. When she was 18, she had many suitors, so her father chose the most noble and wealthiest for her to marry. They visited the monastery together to receive a blessing from the abbot for her marriage, but the visit inspired Euphrosyne to enter the monastic life. As writer David Clark put it, she was "unwilling to allow her gender to be a barrier to adopting this lifestyle for herself". A year later, the abbot sent a monk to Paphnutius' home to invite him to the anniversary celebration of the abbot's ordination; she met with the monk, and admitted to him her wish to become an ascetic, despite her fears of disobeying her father. The monk advised her to disguise herself as a man "to escape her impending marriage". She sent a servant to bring another monk to her, a hermit from Scete, who gave her the same advice. At her request, the monk shaved her head and invested her as a monk. When her father left home for another spiritual retreat, Euphrosyne took advantage of his absence and decided to join a monastery, the same one her father visited, instead of a convent, because she was afraid that her father would find her. She disguised herself as a man, claiming to be a eunuch; the abbot did not recognize her, and welcomed her into the monastery. Euphrosyne took the name Smaragdus, and lived there as a monk for 38 years, until her death in about 470.

Euphrosyne, as Smaragdus, impressed the abbot with "the rapid strides which she made toward a perfect ascetic life", but as writer Laura Swan put it, "Dissension arose in the community over Euphrosyne's beauty, and the same abbot ordered her into seclusion". Smaragdus moved deeper into the desert to a solitary cell, reciting his prayers alone, without the rest of the community, and as Swan also said, grew to love "the intense solitude", eventually only seeing his spiritual director and the abbot. Clark, in his chapter about Euphrosyne in his book Between Medieval Men: Male Friendship and Desire in Early Medieval English Literature, compares her story with the story of Joseph in the Old Testament, which also includes themes of disguise and secret identities. Clark discusses "the complex and contradictory gender dynamic" in Euphrosyne's story, compares Euphrosyne with Eugenia of Rome, a 3rd-century saint who also disguised herself as a man, because they share a "similar dynamic". Clark also says that Eugenia and Euphrosyne's stories, which both include the aid of servants and the use of disguise to escape into a life of religious seclusion, "are typical of tales of lovers thwarting unwanted marriages. However, here the lover is Christ, and the aim is not conjugal bliss but the celibate life". (Note: See Clark pp. 197-203, for his discussion about sexual politics, the themes of homosexuality and gender identity, and same-sex religious communities in Euphrosyne's story.)

== Death and legacy ==
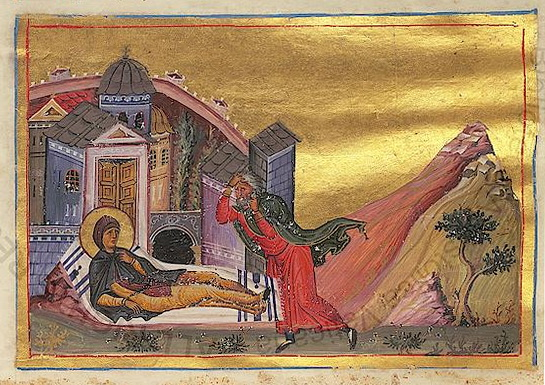
A dying Euphrosyne reveals herself to her father, miniature from the Menologion of Basil II

Euphrosyne's father Paphnutius went to the monastery "for solace for his grief" over the loss of his only daughter; the abbot sent Euphrosyne to provide him with spiritual direction and comfort, but Paphnutius did not recognize her because she covered her face with a veil and never revealed her identity. He received "helpful advice and comforting exhortation" from her anyway and returned to meet with her several times, becoming, as Clark put it, "the spiritual father to her own biological father". Eventually, in the last year before her death, she revealed to Paphnutius her secret; they reconciled, and she requested that he tell no one and that he prepare her body for burial. After she died, Paphnutius distributed all his wealth to the poor and to the monastery, and became a monk himself, living in his daughter's cell for ten years, until he died and was buried beside Euphrosyne. Clark stated that Paphnutius' actions was another instance of the theme of gender reversal in Euphrosyne's story, and a reworking and complication of the issues of physical and spiritual fatherhood revealed in the "reversal of the father-daughter relationship".

Euphrosyne's tomb "became a place of prayer with miracles attributed to her". Her feast day is celebrated on September 25 by the Greek Orthodox Church and January 16 by the Roman Catholic Church. According to Swan, an early version of Euphrosyne's life was written in iambic pentameter and another one was written in prose form. According to Clark, an account of her life, written in Old English, also exists.

In 2022, Euphrosyne was officially added to the Episcopal Church liturgical calendar with a feast day on 27 September.

== Works cited ==
- Clark, David (2009). Between Medieval Men: Male Friendship and Desire in Early Medieval English Literature. Oxford, England: Oxford University Press. ISBN 978-0-19-955815-5. OCLC 243546011.
- Swan, Laura (2001). The Forgotten Desert Mothers: Sayings, Lives, and Stories of Early Christian Women. New York: Paulist Press. ISBN 0-8091-4016-0. OCLC 45460900.
