= Yekaterinburgsky Uyezd =

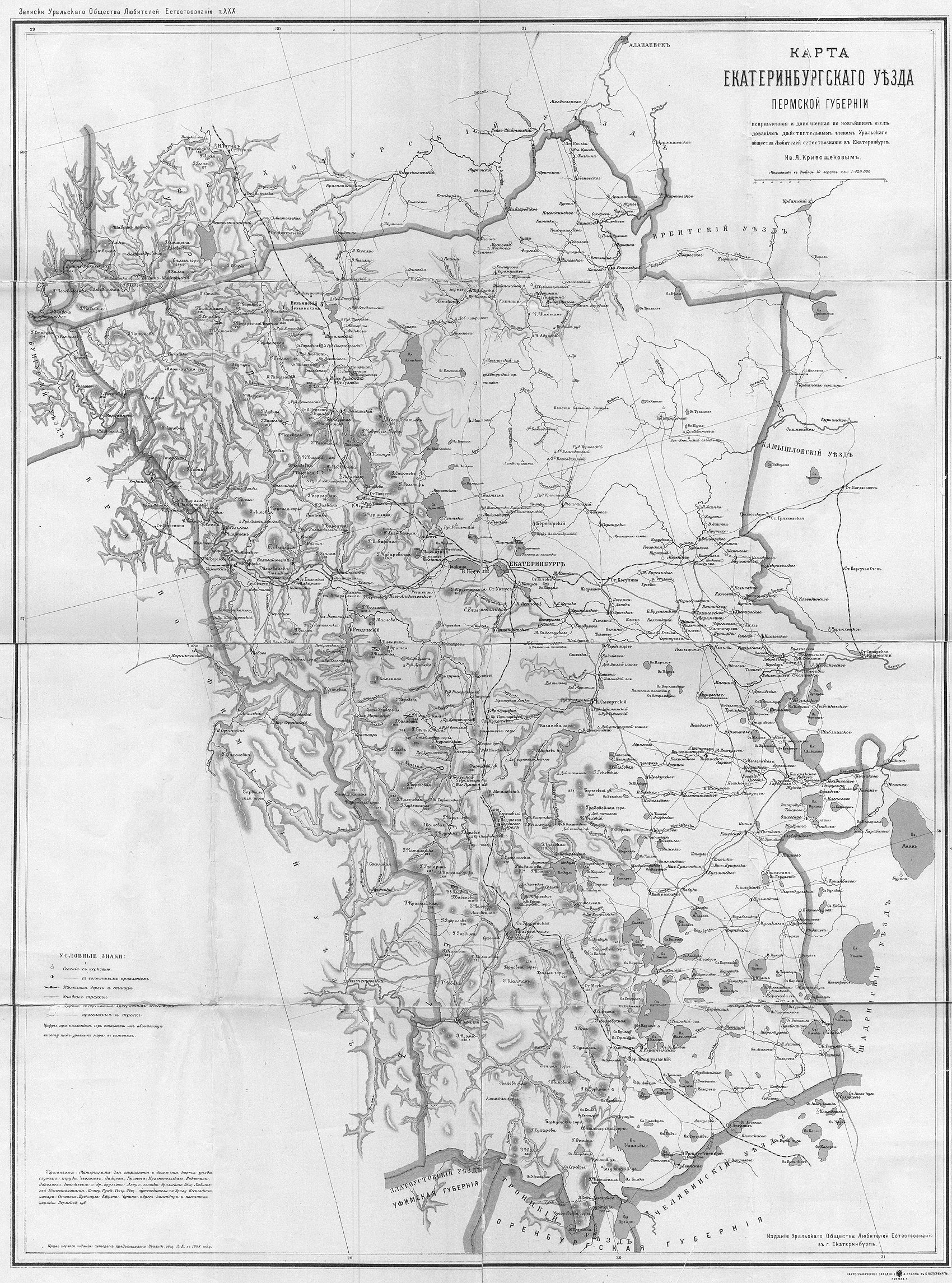

Yekaterinburgsky Uyezd (Екатеринбургский уезд) was one of the subdivisions of the Perm Governorate of the Russian Empire. It was situated in the southeastern part of the governorate. Its administrative centre was Yekaterinburg.

== Demographics ==
At the time of the Russian Empire Census of 1897, Yekaterinburgsky Uyezd had a population of 412,296. Of these, 96.6% spoke Russian, 2.1% Bashkir, 1.0% Tatar, 0.1% German, 0.1% Polish and 0.1% Yiddish as their native language.
