= Solikamsky Uyezd =

Subdivision of Perm Governorate, Russian Empire (1781–1923)

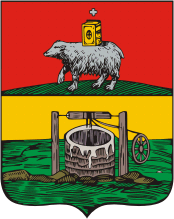
Coat of arms of Solikamsk

Solikamsky Uyezd (Russian: Соликамский уезд) was an administrative division (uyezd) of the Perm Governorate of the Russian Empire, which existed from 1781 to 1923. Its administrative center was the town of Solikamsk. Area: 29,334.3 km^{2}.

== Demographics ==
At the time of the Russian Empire Census of 1897, the uyezd had a population of 228,845. Of these, 70.5% spoke Russian, 28.4% Permyak, 0.7% Tatar, 0.2% Bashkir and 0.1% Komi as their native language.

== Sources ==
- Соликамск // Энциклопедический словарь Брокгауза и Ефрона: В 86 томах (82 т. и 4 доп.). — СПб., 1890–1907.
