= Verkhotursky Uyezd =

Verkhotursky uyezd (Russian: Верхотурский уезд) was an administrative division (an uyezd) of Perm Governorate in the Russian Empire, which existed in 1781–1923. Its seat was in the town of Verkhoturye and its area was 60,117 square kilometers (23,211 sq mi)

== Demographics ==
Its population, according to the Russian Empire Census of 1897, was 270,866. Of those, 96.8% spoke Russian, 1.0% Tatar, 0.7% Mansi, 0.7% Ukrainian, 0.5% Komi-Zyrian, 0.1% Bashkir, and 0.1% Belarusian as their first language.
