= Shadrinsky Uyezd =

Unit of administrative subdivision of the Russian Empire

Shadrinsky Uyezd (Шадринский уезд) was one of the subdivisions (uyezd) of the Perm Governorate of the Russian Empire. It was situated in the southeastern part of the governorate. Its administrative centre was Shadrinsk.

== Demographics ==
At the time of the Russian Empire Census of 1897, Shadrinsky Uyezd had a population of 310,669. Of these, 89.0% spoke Russian, 5.8% Tatar, 4.9% Bashkir and 0.2% Permyak as their native language.
