= Autonomus =

Saint Autonomus
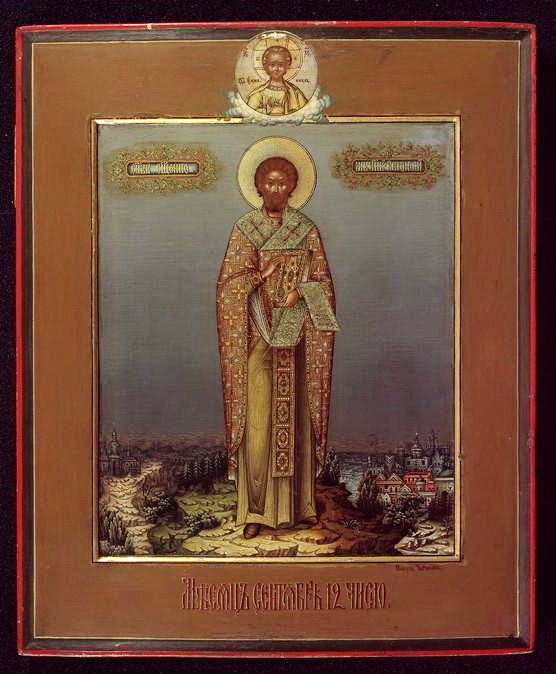

Bishop and Martyr
- Born: unknown Italy
- Died: c. 313; Asia Minor
- Venerated in: Roman Catholic Church; Eastern Orthodox Church
- Feast: 12 September

"Autonomus" is a frequent misspelling of "autonomous".

Saint Autonomus (Greek: Άγιος Αυτόνομος; died 313) is a martyr saint. He is said to have been an Italian bishop who escaped the Diocletianic Persecution by migrating to Bithynia in Asia Minor. He evangelized the region, served as first bishop of Claudiopolis and was subsequently martyred.

In the Eastern Orthodox Church, his feast day is celebrated on September 12.
