= Kungursky Uyezd =

Administrative division of Imperial Russia

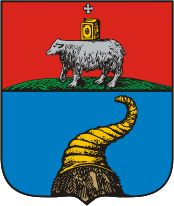
Coat of Arms of Kungur

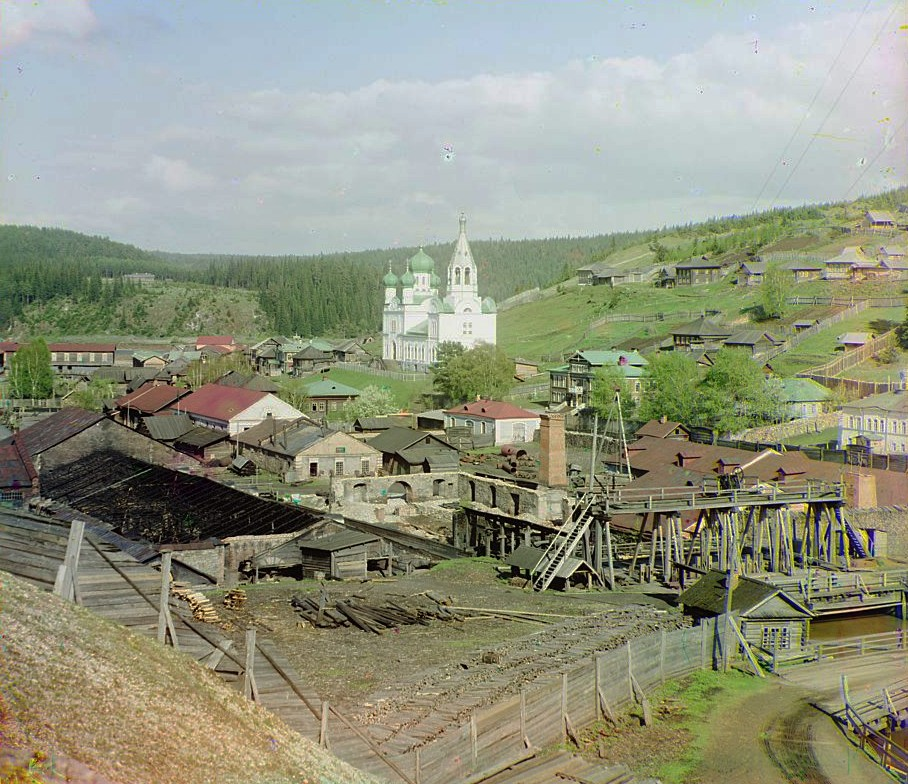
Factory in Kyn belonging to Count S.A.Stroganov (1910)

Kungursky Uyezd (Russian: Кунгурский уезд) was an administrative division of Perm Governorate, Russian Empire, which existed in 1781-1921. Its administrative center was the town of Kungur. Area: 11,372.6 km^{2}.

== Demographics ==
At the time of the Russian Empire Census of 1897, Kungursky Uyezd had a population of 136,343. Of these, 96.6% spoke Russian, 2.0% Tatar, 0.5% Komi-Zyrian, 0.4% Bashkir, 0.2% Mari, 0.1% Mansi and 0.1% Yiddish as their native language.

== Sources ==
- Brockhaus and Efron Encyclopedic Dictionary
