= Okhansky District =

Okhansky District Оханский район (Russian)
- District
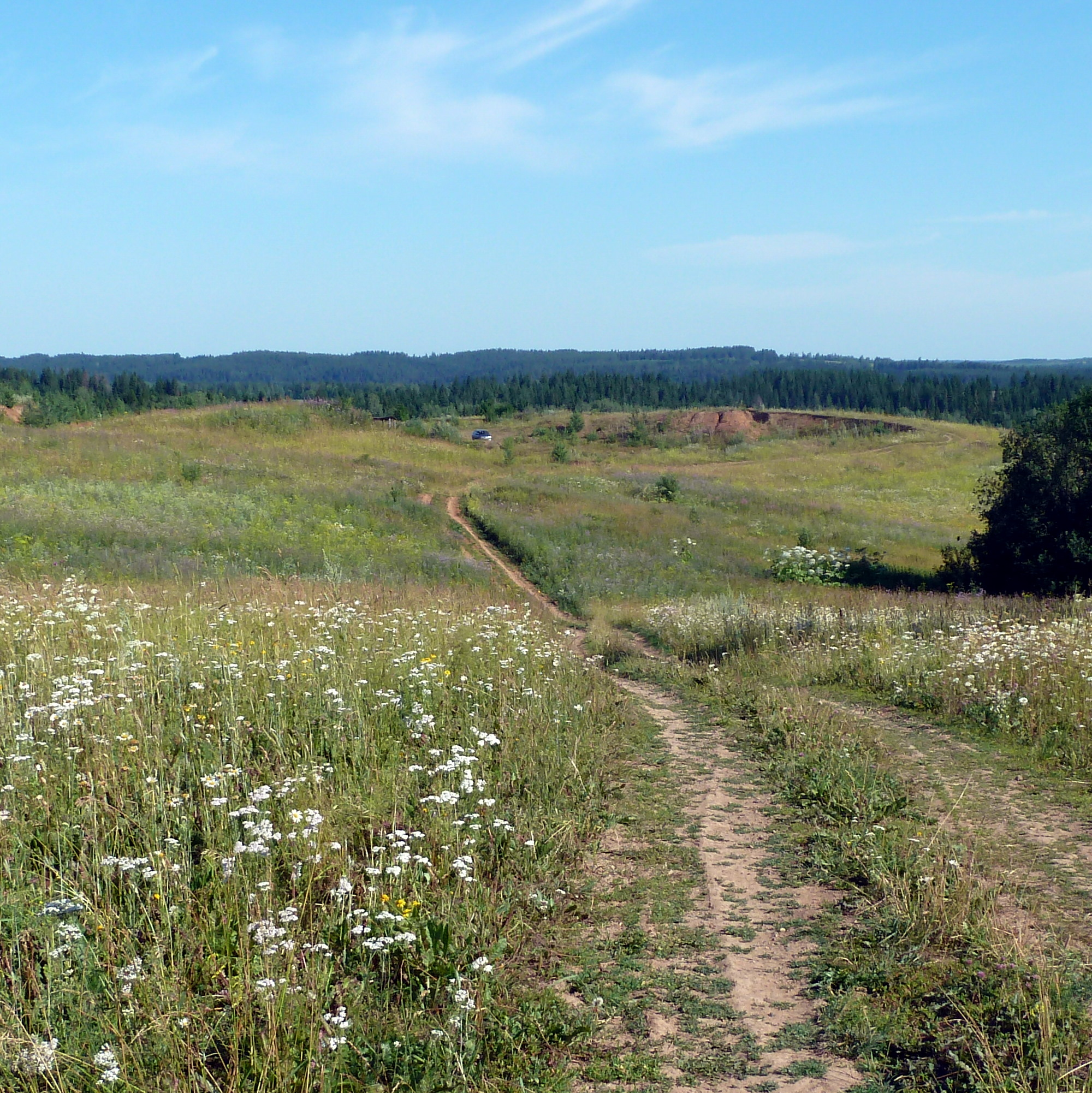
- Quarry in Okhansky District

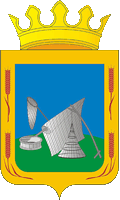
- Flag Coat of arms
- Location of Okhansky District in Perm Krai
- Coordinates: 57°39′N 55°18′E
- Country: Russia
- Federal subject: Perm Krai
- Established: December 1923 (first), January 12, 1965 (second)
- Administrative center: Okhansk

Area
  - Total: 1,516 km^{2} (585 sq mi)

Population (2010 Census)
  - Total: 16,272
  - Density: 10.73/km^{2} (27.80/sq mi)
  - Urban: 44.6%
  - Rural: 55.4%

Administrative structure
  - Inhabited localities: 1 cities/towns, 61 rural localities

Municipal structure
  - Municipally incorporated as: Okhansky Municipal District
  - Municipal divisions: 1 urban settlements, 7 rural settlements
- Time zone: UTC+5 (MSK+2)
- OKTMO ID: 57642000
- Website: http://ohansk-adm.ru/

Okhansky District (Russian: Оха́нский райо́н) is an administrative district (raion) of Perm Krai, Russia; one of the thirty-three in the krai. Municipally, it is incorporated as Okhansky Municipal District. It is located in the southwest of the krai. The area of the district is 1,516 square kilometers (585 sq mi). Its administrative center is the town of Okhansk. Population: 16,272 (2010 census); 17,873 (2002 census); 18,747 (1989 Soviet census). The population of Okhansk accounts for 44.6% of the district's total population.

== Geography ==
The Kama River is the largest in the district and forms the district's border with Permsky District.

== History ==
The district was established in December 1923. It was merged into Ochyorsky District on February 1, 1963 but was restored on January 12, 1965.

== Demographics ==
Ethnic composition:

- Russians: 94.3%
- Komi-Permyak people: 1.5%
- Tatars: 1.1%

== Economy ==
The economy of the district is based mostly on light industry and agriculture.

== Sources ==
- Законодательное собрание Пермской области. Закон №416-67 от 28 февраля 1996 г. «Об административно-территориальном устройстве Пермского края», в ред. Закона №504-ПК от 9 июля 2015 г. «О внесении изменений в Закон Пермской области "Об административно-территориальном устройстве Пермского края"». Вступил в силу с момента опубликования. Опубликован: "Звезда", №38, 12 марта 1996 г. (Legislative Assembly of Perm Oblast. Law #416-67 of February 28, 1996 On the Administrative-Territorial Structure of Perm Krai, as amended by the Law #504-PK of July 9, 2015 On Amending the Law of Perm Oblast "On the Administrative-Territorial Structure of Perm Krai". Effective as of the moment of publication.).
- Законодательное собрание Пермской области. Закон №1878-407 от 1 декабря 2004 г. «Об утверждении границ и о наделении статусом муниципальных образований Оханского района Пермского края», в ред. Закона №273-ПК от 14 декабря 2013 г. «О внесении изменений в отдельные Законы Пермской области, Коми-Пермяцкого автономного округа, Пермского края». Вступил в силу через десять дней со дня официального опубликования. Опубликован: "Бюллетень Законодательного Собрания и администрации Пермской области", №1, II часть, 27 января 2005 г. (Legislative Assembly of Perm Oblast. Law #1878-407 of December 1, 2004 On Establishing the Borders and on Granting the Status to the Municipal Formations of Okhansky District of Perm Krai, as amended by the Law #273-PK of December 14, 2013 On Amending Various Laws of Perm Oblast, Komi-Permyak Autonomous Okrug, Perm Krai. Effective as of the day which is ten days following the day of the official publication.).
