= 1779 in Russia =

Events from the year 1779 in Russia

== Incumbents ==
- Monarch – Catherine II

== Events ==
- Pavlograd founded, Lipetsk and Sergach granted town status.
- Seven Months War
- Treaty of Aynalikavak
- Russia and France acted as diplomatic intermediaries to end War of the Bavarian Succession.
- Seven Months' War (March-December)

== Births ==
- 2 February - Maria Naryshkina, mistress of Alexander I of Russia
- 27 April - Grand Duke Konstantin Pavlovich of Russia

== Deaths ==
- 13 April - Grigory Teplov, philosopher (born 1717)
- 25 September - Ekaterina Chernysheva, courtier (born 1715)
