= Krasnoufimsky Uyezd =

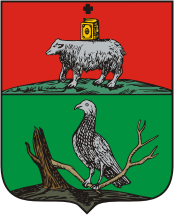
Coat of Atms of Krasnoufimsk

Krasnoufimsky Uyezd (Russian: Красноуфимский уезд) was an administrative division (uyezd) of Perm Governorate, Russian Empire, which existed in 1781-1923. Its administrative center was the town of Krasnoufimsk. The division's area was 24,485 km².

== Demographics ==
At the time of the Russian Empire Census of 1897, Krasnoufimsky Uyezd had a population of 259,165. Of these, 77.9% spoke Russian, 8.4% Bashkir, 7.3% Tatar, 5.9% Mari, 0.2% Udmurt and 0.2% Mansi as their native language.
