= 1775 in Russia =

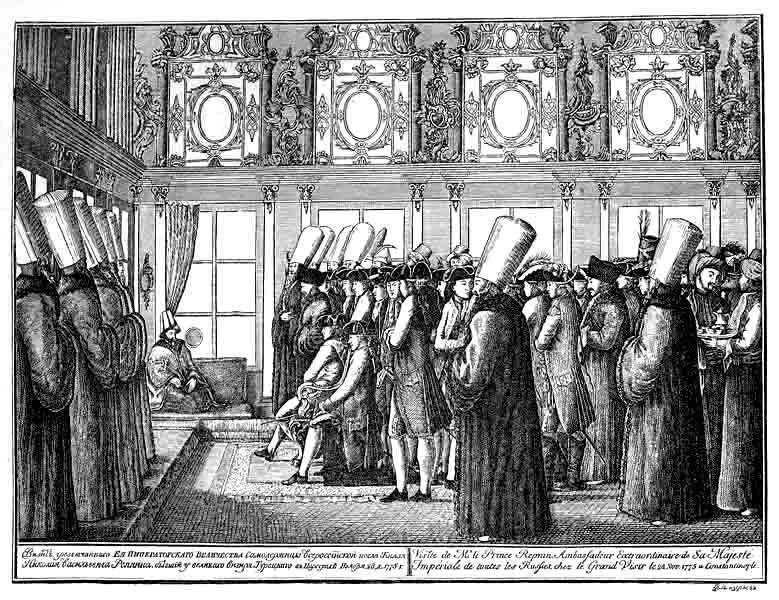
Prince N.Repnin's embassy to Turkey, engraving by I.Bugreev (1775)

Events from the year 1775 in Russia

== Incumbents ==
- Monarch – Catherine II

== Events ==
- The end of the Pugachev's Rebellion
- Great Reform of 1775 - this territorial reform divided Russia into 50 gubernis (governorates) based strictly on population size to increase local governmental efficiency.
- Destruction of the Zaporozhian Sich - In June 1775, Imperial Russian troops surrounded and systematically dissolved the Zaporozhian Sich.

== Births ==
- Andrey Ivanovich Ivanov (1775–1848) - Neo-Classical painter and educator
- Pyotr Grigoriyevich Butkov (1775–1857) - historian, academic, and state official
- Carlo Rossi (1775–1849) - Neoclassical architect moved to Russia as a child, designing milestones like Palace Square, the General Staff Building, and the Mikhailovsky Palace.
- Karl Ludwig von Budberg (1775–1829) - a Baltic German nobleman who served as a notable military officer in the Imperial Russian Army

== Deaths ==
- January 21 - Yemelyan Pugachev (born 1742)
- December 15 - Princess Tarakanova (born 1745)
