= 1776 in Russia =

Events from the year 1776 in the Russian Empire

== Incumbents ==
- Monarch – Catherine the Great

== Events ==
- 22 July – Empress Catherine the Great issues a revised Instruction (Nakaz), refining Enlightenment-inspired proposals for Russia’s legal code.
- August – Establishment of the Novgorod Viceroyalty, subdivided into Novgorod and Olonets oblasts, as part of Catherine’s administrative reforms.
- November – Russian troops intervene in the Crimean Khanate, enforcing Catherine’s decision to install Şahin Giray as khan.
- Expansion of the Russian Assignation Bank network, with a new branch established in Tobolsk to extend circulation of paper rubles.
- Further implementation of Catherine’s vice-regal reforms, aimed at centralising governance across the empire.
- Russia maintains formal neutrality in the American Revolutionary War, rejecting British requests for troops.

== Births ==
- No verifiable records of culturally significant births directly tied to Russia in 1776.

== Deaths ==
- 15 March – Natalia Alexeievna of Russia (1755–1776), first wife of the future Emperor Paul I.
- Anna Vorontsova (date uncertain), member of the prominent Vorontsov noble family.
