= Osinsky Uyezd =

Osinsky Uyezd (Russian: Оси́нский уе́зд) was an administrative division of Perm Governorate, Russian Empire, which existed in 1781–1923. The administrative center was the town of Osa. It had an area of 19,246 square kilometres (7,431 sq mi).

== Demographics ==
At the time of the Russian Empire Census of 1897, Osinsky Uyezd had a population of 321,774. Of these, 82.7% spoke Russian, 10.7% Bashkir, 4.8% Tatar and 1.8% Udmurt as their native language.

== Sources ==
- Brockhaus and Efron Encyclopedic Dictionary (1890–1907)
