= Kamyshlovsky Uyezd =

Subdivision of Perm Governorate, Russian Empire

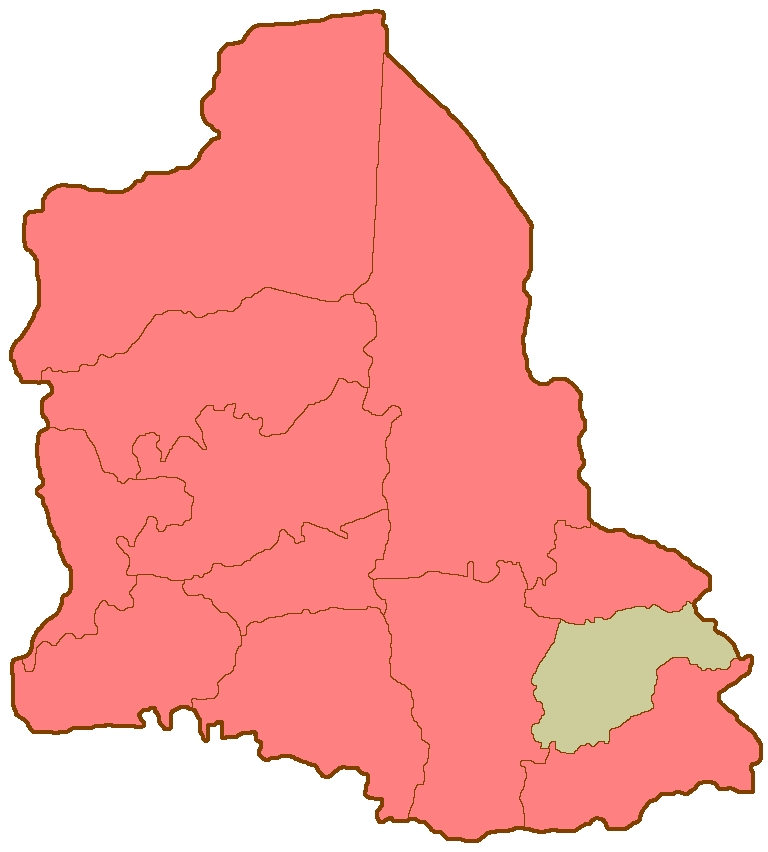
Kamyshlovsky Uyezd (in green) on the map of Perm Governorate.

Kamyshlovsky Uyezd (Камышловский уезд) was one of the subdivisions of the Perm Governorate of the Russian Empire. It was situated in the southeastern part of the governorate. Its administrative centre was Kamyshlov.

== Demographics ==
At the time of the Russian Empire Census of 1897, Kamyshlovsky Uyezd had a population of 248,128. Of these, 99.7% spoke Russian, 0.1% Tatar and 0.1% Polish as their native language.
