= Perm Governorate =

1781–1923 unit of Russia

Coordinates: 58.0139°N 56.2489°E

Perm Governorate Пермская губерния (Russian)
- Governorate of the Russian Empire, Russian Republic and Russian SFSR
- 1781–1923
- Coat of arms

- Location in the Russian Empire
- Capital: Perm
- Area
  - (1897): 332,052 km^{2} (128,206 sq mi)
- Population
  - (1897): 2,994,302
- History
  - Established: 1781
  - Disestablished: 3 November 1923
- Political subdivisions: uezds: 12
Preceded by	Succeeded by
Perm Viceroyalty	Ural Oblast

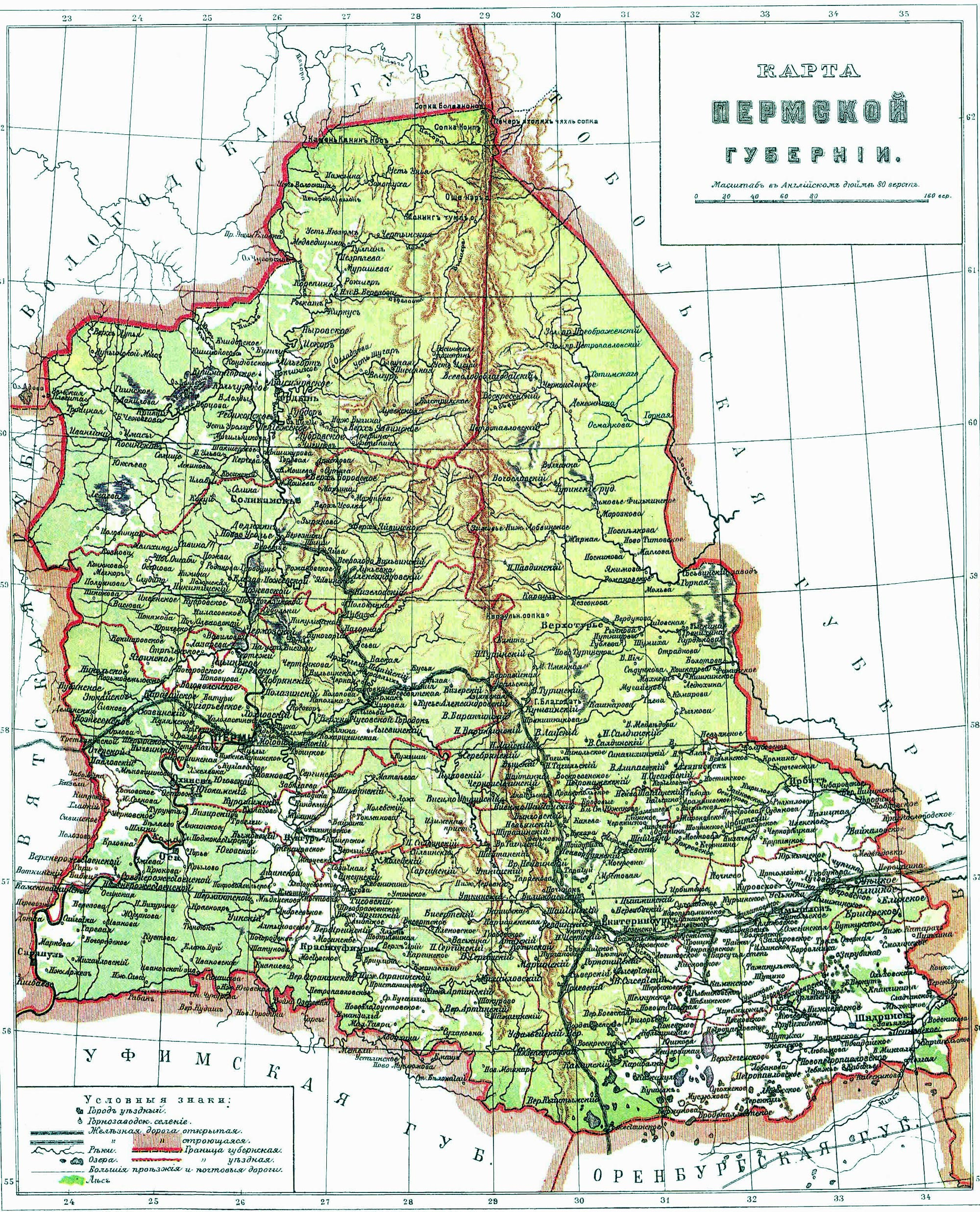
Map of the governorate

Perm Governorate (Russian: Пермская губерния, romanized: Permskaya guberniya), also known as the Governorate of Perm, was an administrative-territorial unit (guberniya) of the Russian Empire and the Russian SFSR from 1781 to 1923. It was located on both slopes of the Ural Mountains, and its administrative center was the city of Perm. The region gave its name to the Permian period, the last period of the Paleozoic era.

== History ==
On November 20 (December 1), 1780, Catherine the Great signed a decree establishing the Governorate of Perm consisting of the two oblasts – Perm and Yekaterinburg (roughly corresponding to the modern Perm Krai and Sverdlovsk Oblast of Russia), and the establishment of the provincial city of Perm. The first Governor-General of Perm and Tobolsk Governorate-General was appointed Lieutenant-General Yevgeny Petrovich Kashkin. In accordance with the decree of Emperor Paul I of December 12, 1796 "A new division of the state in the province", the joint Perm and Tobolsk Governorate-General was split into separate Perm and Tobolsk Governorates. On July 15, 1919, Yekaterinburg Governorate was separated from the Perm Governorate, consisting of 6 uyezds, located in the east, beyond the Urals. On November 4, 1920, Sarapulsky Uyezd of Vyatka Governorate was included in Perm Governorate. On November 3, 1923, Perm Governorate was abolished and its territory was included in the Ural Oblast with its center in Yekaterinburg.

== Geography ==
Perm Governorate was bordered with Vologda Governorate (to the north), Tobolsk Governorate (to the east), Orenburg and Ufa governorates (to the south) and Vyatka Governorate (to the west).

Governorate's area was 332,052 km^{2}, 181,000 of them – in Europe and 151,000 – in Asia. Ural mountains, that crossed governorate from north to south for 640 km was a border between European and Asian parts and split it in two administrative oblasts – Perm to the west, and Yekaterinburg to the east. Highest point of governorate was Konzhakovsky Kamen (1565 m). European part of Perm governorate situated in basin of Kama River, Asian part – in basin of Tobol River. Drainage basin of Pechora River occupied extreme north of Cherdynsky Uyezd.

== Industry and agriculture ==
=== Industry ===
The Perm Governorate was one of the main centres of mining, metallurgical and metal-processing industries of the Russian Empire. In the middle of the 19th century, there were 4 fiscal and 18 private mining districts on the territory of the province, the largest industrial centres were Yekaterinburg and Motovilikha Plants in Perm suburbs. At the beginning of the 19th century 9 state enterprises, 69 private and possession plants, about 300 mines, 13 salterns, 14 coal mines, gold, platinum and silver mines were operating in the Governorate. At the turn of the 19th and 20th centuries, joint-stock companies arose (11 in metallurgy, 12 in gold-platinum), including those with French, Belgian and British capital. In the 1910s, there were more than 260 thousand workers in the province, 80% of the enterprises had more than 500 workers.

The mining enterprises (mining and production of copper, iron, steel and pig iron, gold, platinum, hard coal and salt) occupied the middle belt of the Governorate on the territory of the Ural mountain range and covered the uyezds centered around towns of Perm, Solikamsk and Cherdyn on the western side of the range, and Verkhoturye, Yekaterinburg, Krasnoufimsk and parts of Kamyshlov and Irbit on the eastern side. By the beginning of the 20th century, the manufacture of simple agricultural machinery and implements, which were supplied outside the Governorate, had developed considerably.

=== Agriculture and trades ===
Cereals (rye, oats, barley) were sown almost throughout the Governorate, but with different successes. The main producers were the southern uyezds – Shadrinsky, Kamyshlovsky, Krasnoufimsky and Osinsky. In the southern districts, significant quantities of wheat, millet and buckwheat were grown, as well as flax for seed production. In the Okhansky, Kungursky, Permsky and Irbitsky uyezds the yields were average, and in the Cherdynsky, Verkhotursky, Solikamsky, and Yekaterinburgsky uyezds there was not enough bread even for the rural population. Vegetable farming was widespread, but not gardening – fruit bushes (gooseberry, raspberry) were bred. Beekeeping was developed in Krasnovfimsk, Osinsky, Okhansky and Kungursky uyezds.

Cattle breeding was developed in the Shadrinsky uyezd among the Bashkirs. Horses were bred predominantly. Cattle were kept mainly for local needs. In the Cherdynsky and Verkhotursk uyezds, the Mansi were engaged in reindeer breeding.

For the rural inhabitants of Solikamsky, Cherdynsky and partly Verkhotursky uyezds, hunting, wood felling, shipbuilding and charcoal burning for mining plants were subsidiary occupations. Due to the lack of man made transport routes carriage transportation was of vital importance. Zemstvo turned its attention to the development of dairy processing, hand weaving and beekeeping. On the initiative of zemstvo, in 1896, the instructors were sent to the province to teach the population the basics of butter and weaving. The development of cottage industries was promoted by the Artisanal and Industrial Bank of the Perm provincial zemstvo.

== Administrative division ==
Perm Governorate was divided by Ural Mountains into two oblasts – Perm and Yekaterinburg, which were subdivided into a total of 12 uyezd administrated by corresponding towns (in parentheses).

Perm oblast (European part):

- Permsky Uyezd (Perm)
- Krasnoufimsky Uyezd (Krasnoufimsk)
- Kungursky Uyezd (Kungur)
- Osinsky Uyezd (Osa)
- Okhansky Uyezd (Okhansk)
- Solikamsky Uyezd (Solikamsk)
- Cherdynsky Uyezd (Cherdyn)

Yekaterinburg oblast (Asian part):

- Verkhotursky Uyezd (Verkhoturye)
- Yekaterinburgsky Uyezd (Yekaterinburg)
- Irbitsky Uyezd (Irbit)
- Kamyshlovsky Uyezd (Kamyshlov)
- Shadrinsky Uyezd (Shadrinsk)

== Population ==
In early 19th century, population of the governorate was approx. 940,000. According 1896 data, population of region was 2,968,472 (1,433,231 of them are male and 1,535,211 are female). According to the 1897 Census, population was 2,994,302.

Major cities were:

- Perm: 45,205
- Yekaterinburg: 43,239
- Irbit: 20,062

According 1897 Census, for 90.3% of governorate's population used Russian as their native language, 3.1% used Komi-Permyak language, 2.9% – Bashkir language, 1.6% – Tatar language. Most of population was Orthodox Christians with Old Believers (7.29%) and Muslim (5.06%) minorities.

== Economy ==
The economy of governorate was based on industry, however in some parts of region prevailed agriculture sector. Arable lands was 33,000 km^{2} (approx. 9.53% of total area). Main crops were: rye, oat and barley. Wheat was cultivated mostly in southern areas. Livestock breeding was well developed in Shadrinsky Uyezd, among Bashkir people. Despite plenty of rivers, fishing was developed only in Cherdynsky Uyezd. Commercial hunting was also only in the north of region, in Cherdynsky Uyezd.

Industry was based by mining, main minerals included copper, iron ore, gold, coal and salt. Most of mining and metallurgical plants was situated in central part of Ural Mountains. The Perm Governorate was well connected by railroads with other regions of Russian Empire. Main rivers also had great transport significance.

== See also ==
- Klimova Treasure
