= Okhansk =

Town in Perm Krai, Russia

Okhansk Оханск
- Town
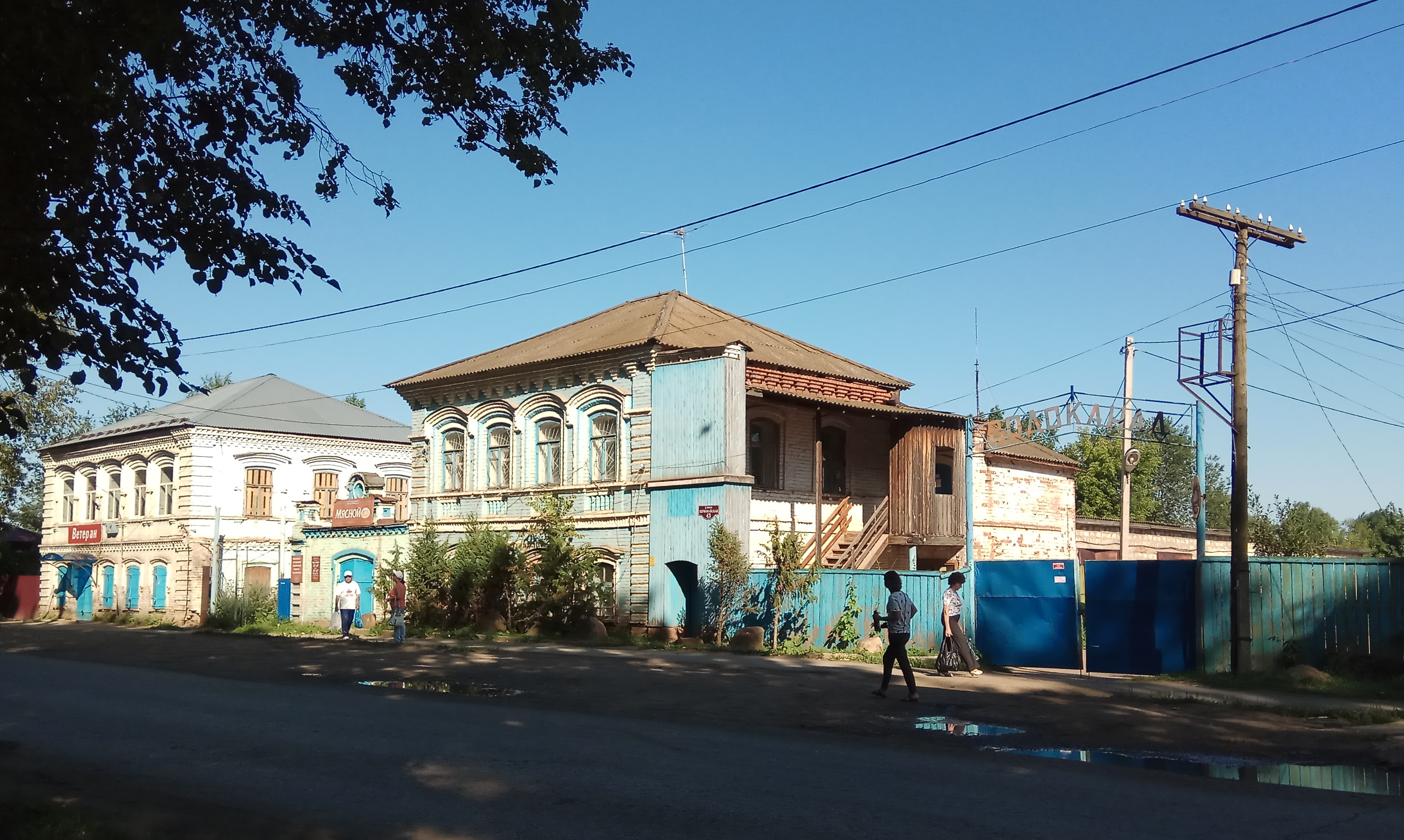
- View of street in Okhansk

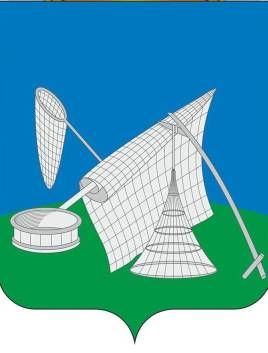
- Flag Coat of arms
- Interactive map of Okhansk
- Location of Okhansk Okhansk (Perm Krai)
- Coordinates: 57°44′N 55°24′E
- Country: Russia
- Federal subject: Perm Krai
- Administrative district: Okhansky District
- First mentioned: 1597
- Town status since: 1781
- Elevation: 110 m (360 ft)

Population (2010 Census)
  - Total: 7,250
  - Estimate (2023): 6,290 (−13.2%)

Administrative status
  - Capital of: Okhansky District

Municipal status
  - Municipal district: Okhansky Municipal District
  - Urban settlement: Okhanskoye Urban Settlement
  - Capital of: Okhansky Municipal District, Okhanskoye Urban Settlement
- Time zone: UTC+5 (MSK+2)
- Postal code: 618100
- OKTMO ID: 57642101001
- Website: ohansk-city.ru

Okhansk (Russian: Оха́нск) is a town and the administrative center of Okhansky District in Perm Krai, Russia, located on the right bank of the Kama River, 119 kilometers (74 mi) southwest of Perm, the administrative center of the krai. Population: 7,250 (2010 census); 7,994 (2002 census); 8,414 (1989 Soviet census).

== History ==
First mentioned in 1597 as the village of Okhannoye (Оха́нное), it was also called Okhanskoye (Оха́нское) or Okhan (Оха́н, Оха́нь). Town status was granted in 1781. Some Polish insurgents of the January Uprising were exiled in Okhansk in the 1860s.

== Administrative and municipal status ==
Within the framework of administrative divisions, Okhansk serves as the administrative center of Okhansky District, to which it is directly subordinated. As a municipal division, the town of Okhansk is incorporated within Okhansky Municipal District as Okhanskoye Urban Settlement.
