= Koychubay =

Coordinates: 54°43′08″N 72°43′03″E

Koychubay (Russian: Койчубай; Kazakh: Қойшыбай) is a rural Kazakh settlement in the Sherbakulsky District, Omsk oblast in Western Siberia, Russia.

According to the 2010 census, it had a population of 199.

== History ==
Formerly semi-nomadic and now settled, the village - or aul, as it is still called - has probably existed in the steppe since the second half of the 19th century. According to researchers, it was named after a local leader, Koyshibay (Koyshubay). The person in question was most likely Koyshubay Orden, the headman of the kystau, or the winter settlement - a place where Kazakh nomads would spend the cold months and build permanent buildings. Many of these sites were later developed into permanent settlements as the population gradually transitioned to a sedentary way of life at the turn of the 20th century.

Both the structure and the precise location of the aul of Koychubay (transcribed as Koyshybay at the time) underwent further changes during the Soviet collectivization period.

==== Russian revolution and the Civil war ====
Its most internationally notable resident was the entrepreneur Isa Zhaksymbayev (Zhaksybayev), a horse trader and a mill owner, who, at the height of the Russian Civil War in 1918 and 1919, employed an escaped prisoner of war Josip Broz, later known as Tito. In his own recollections, Tito described his host and employer as a wealthy man and a prominent figure who exercised judicial authority among local Kazakhs, who, according to Broz, were still living in yurts at the time.

After the war, Isa and his son Zhunus would become victims of Stalinist repressions.

In the 1920s, following the Bolsheviks' rise to power, Koychubay was a settlement consisting of more than ten households and served as a small educational, economic and administrative center of Aul No. 3 Village Council in Borisovsky District, Omsk okrug, Siberian Krai. According to several academic and local sources, Isa, who financed the construction of both mill and the mosque, agreed to the mosque's conversion into a school, which some sources also describe as an illiteracy eradication spot.

In 1930, Koychubay and the neighboring aul of Kaipbergen were incorporated into the "Hammer and Sickle" collectivist farm - a kolkhoz. In the late 1930s, the mill that had belonged to Isa was dismantled and relocated to the Krasny Vostok ("Red East") kolkhoz in Sherbakulsky District.
