= Nikolai Babaev =

Soviet soldier

- Николай Архипович Бабаев
- Born: 28 February 1924; Ust-Sumy, Kargatsky Uyezd, Novonikolayevsk Governorate, Soviet Union
- Died: 13 August 1984 (aged 60); Novosibirsk, Soviet Union
- Military career
- Allegiance: Soviet Union
- Service years: 1942–1946
- Rank: Guard Senior sergeant
- Unit: 53rd Guards Tank Brigade
- Conflicts: Second World War
- Awards: Hero of the Soviet Union

Nikolai Arkhipovich Babaev (Russian: Никола́й Архи́пович Баба́ев; 28 February 1924 – 13 August 1984) was a soldier of the Soviet tank forces. He served during the Second World War, and received the title of Hero of the Soviet Union on 27 June 1945. He reached the rank of Guard senior sergeant.

== Biography ==
Nikolai Babaev was born on 28 February 1924, in the village of Ust-Sumy, in what was then Suminskaya volost, Novonikolayevsk Governorate (now Kargatsky District, Novosibirsk Oblast) into a peasant family. After graduating from several classes of high school, he worked on a collective farm, later moved to Novosibirsk, where he worked at the mechanical plant No. 386.

In January 1942, Babaev was called up for service in the Workers 'and Peasants' Red Army by the Dzerzhinsky District Military Commissariat of the city of Novosibirsk. For six months he studied in a reserve military unit. From August 1942 - on the fronts of the Great Patriotic War. For participation in battles with German troops, he was awarded three orders.

The commander of the armoured personnel carrier of the control company of the 53rd Guards Tank Brigade of the 6th Guards Tank Corps of the 3rd Guards Tank Army of the 1st Ukrainian Front of the Guard, Senior Sergeant Nikolai Babaev, especially distinguished himself during the Upper Silesian and Lower Silesian offensive operations in February–March 1945. In February 1945, two armoured personnel carriers, one of which was commanded by Babaev, broke into the city of Madlau, scattering its garrison and killing more than 20 German soldiers and officers. Leaving the city, the armoured personnel carriers intercepted the enemy convoy on one of the roads, destroying many vehicles and carts, and also inflicting heavy losses on the convoy escort. In the same raid, the crews of armoured personnel carriers damaged the railway, forcing the German echelon to stop. With machine gun fire, Babaev killed German soldiers who were trying to run away, while his comrades set fire to the train.

In the next raid near the village of Rotwasser, Babaev killed about 30 enemy soldiers in battle and captured a German officer. During the raid near the town of Naumburg, Babaev's group captured two German liaison officers, who told the intelligence officers that the headquarters of the SS unit was located in Naumburg. Having secretly entered Naumburg, Babaev and his subordinates killed two German sentries and, breaking through to the headquarters, seized valuable documents and captured several officers. Breaking away from the chase, Babaev delivered the prisoners and documents to the headquarters of the brigade, which subsequently ensured successful military operations for Soviet tank formations.

On 7 March 1945, tank forces led by Babaev captured the dominant height and held it until the approach of Soviet units. During this battle, a counterattack by superior enemy forces was repulsed. Babaev personally destroyed two German tanks and killed several dozen enemy soldiers and officers.

For the exemplary performance of the combat missions of the command, courage on the front of the fight against the German invaders and the courage and heroism shown at the same time, by the Decree of the Presidium of the Supreme Soviet of the Soviet Union of 27 June 1945, senior sergeant Nikolai Arkhipovich Babaev was awarded the title of Hero of the Soviet Union with the award of the Order of Lenin and the Gold Star medal » number 8032.

He acted just as bravely in the Berlin offensive, for which he was awarded the Order of the Patriotic War.

In 1946, senior sergeant N. A. Babaev was demobilized. He lived in the urban-type settlement of Pashino (in 1997 it was incorporated into the city of Novosibirsk). In 1947 he joined the CPSU (b), graduated from the party school. He worked at the Novosibirsk Iskra Mechanical Plant.

Babaev died on 13 August 1984. He was buried at the Northern (Pashinsky) cemetery in Novosibirsk.

== Awards ==
- Hero of the Soviet Union (27 June 1945)
- Order of Lenin (27 June 1945)
- Order of the Patriotic War, 2nd class (18 May 1945)
- Order of the Red Star (22 April 1944)
- Order of Glory 3rd class (3 October 1945)
- Various medals

== Memorials ==
- A bust of Babaev is in the central park of Kargat, on the Alley of Glory.
- A street in Novosibirsk is named after Babaev.
- A memorial plaque was installed on the house in which in Pashino where Babaev lived.

== Literature ==
- Heroes of the Soviet Union: A Brief Biographical Dictionary / Prev. ed. Collegium I. N. Shkadov. - M .: Military Publishing, 1987. - T. 1 / Abaev - Lyubichev /. — 911 p. — 100,000 copies. — ISBN ots., Reg. No. in RCP 87–95382.
- Derkachenko I. G. Military drivers. - M., 1960.
- Stars of military valor: About the Heroes of the Soviet Union - Novosibirsk / comp. E.D. Golovin, L.M. Zhivoglyadov. - 2. - Novosibirsk: Novosibirsk book publishing house, 1986. - 432 p.
- Novosibirsk - Heroes of the Fatherland. - Novosibirsk, 2010.
