= Tomsk Governorate =

1804–1925 unit of Russia

Coordinates: 56.4886°N 84.9522°E

Tomsk Governorate Томская губерния (Russian)
- Governorate of the Russian Empire
- 1804–1925
- Coat of arms

- Location in the Russian Empire
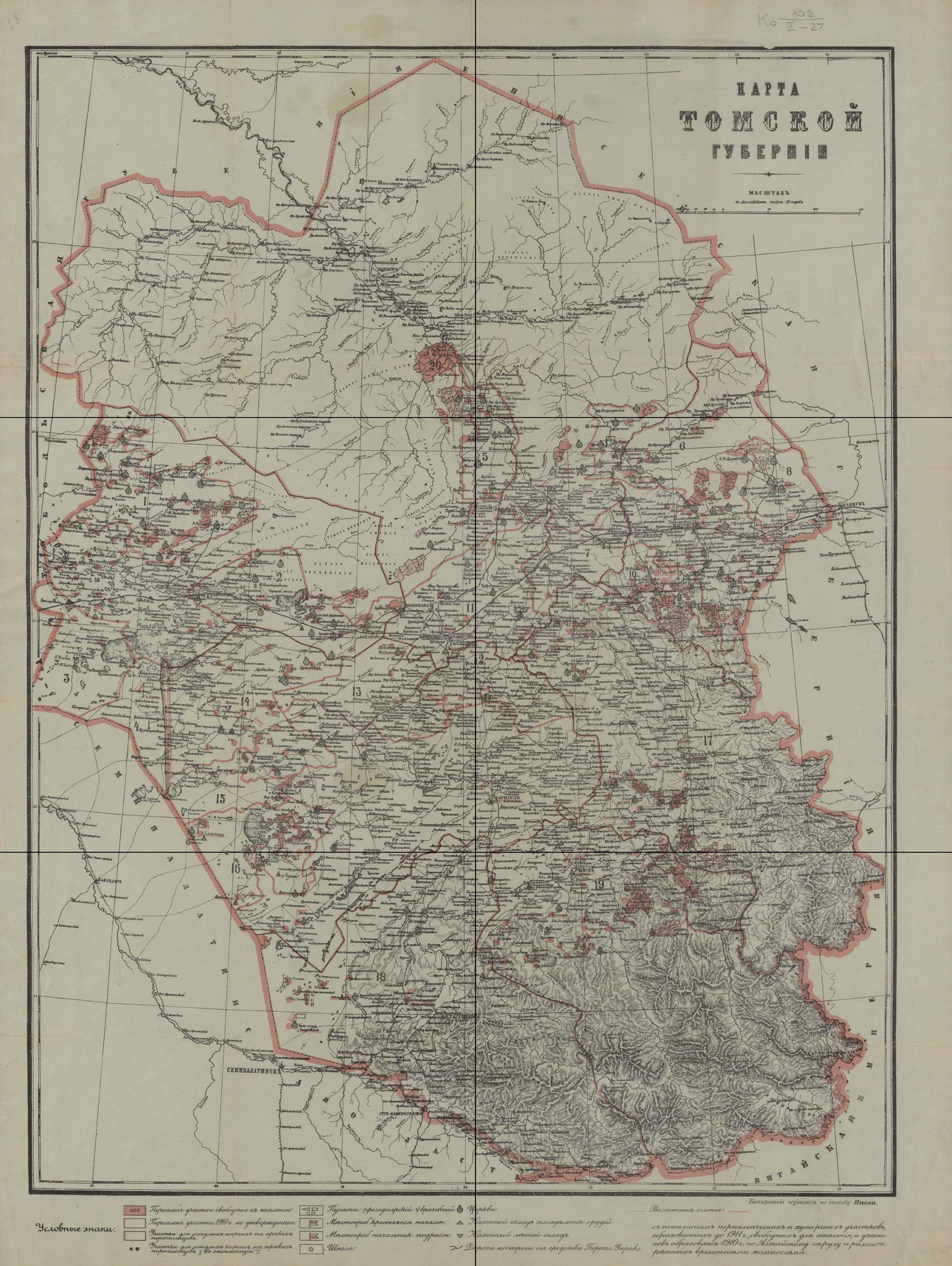
- Capital: Tomsk
- Area
  - 1897: 847,328 km^{2} (327,155 sq mi)
- Population
  - 1897: 1 927 679
  - 1906: 2,412,700
- History
  - Established: 1804
  - Disestablished: 1925
Preceded by
Tobolsk Governorate
Succeeded by
Siberian Krai
Altai Governorate
Novonikolayevsk Governorate
Omsk Governorate
Yeniseysk Governorate
- Today part of: Kazakhstan; Russia

Tomsk Governorate (Russian: Томская губерния, romanized: Tomskaya guberniya) was an administrative-territorial unit (guberniya) of the Russian Empire, the Russian Republic, and the Russian SFSR, which existed from 1804 to 1925 as part of Siberian Governorate-General (1804–1822) and West Siberian Governorate-General (1822–1882). Its capital was in Tomsk.

== General information ==
The Tomsk Governorate was located in the southeastern part of Western Siberia. To the north, north-west and west it bordered the Tobolsk Governorate, to the south-west the Semipalatinsk region, to the south and south-east Mongolia, and to the east and north-east the Yeniseisk Governorate.

In terms of territory, it corresponded to the territories of the modern Altai Krai, the Republic of Altai, Kemerovo Oblast, Novosibirsk Oblast and Tomsk Oblast of the Russian Federation, Ust-Kamenogorsk and Semipalatinsk Oblast of Kazakhstan, the western lands of Krasnoyarsk Krai and the eastern lands of Omsk Oblast. During the 20th century, the territory of the province constantly diminished.

== History ==
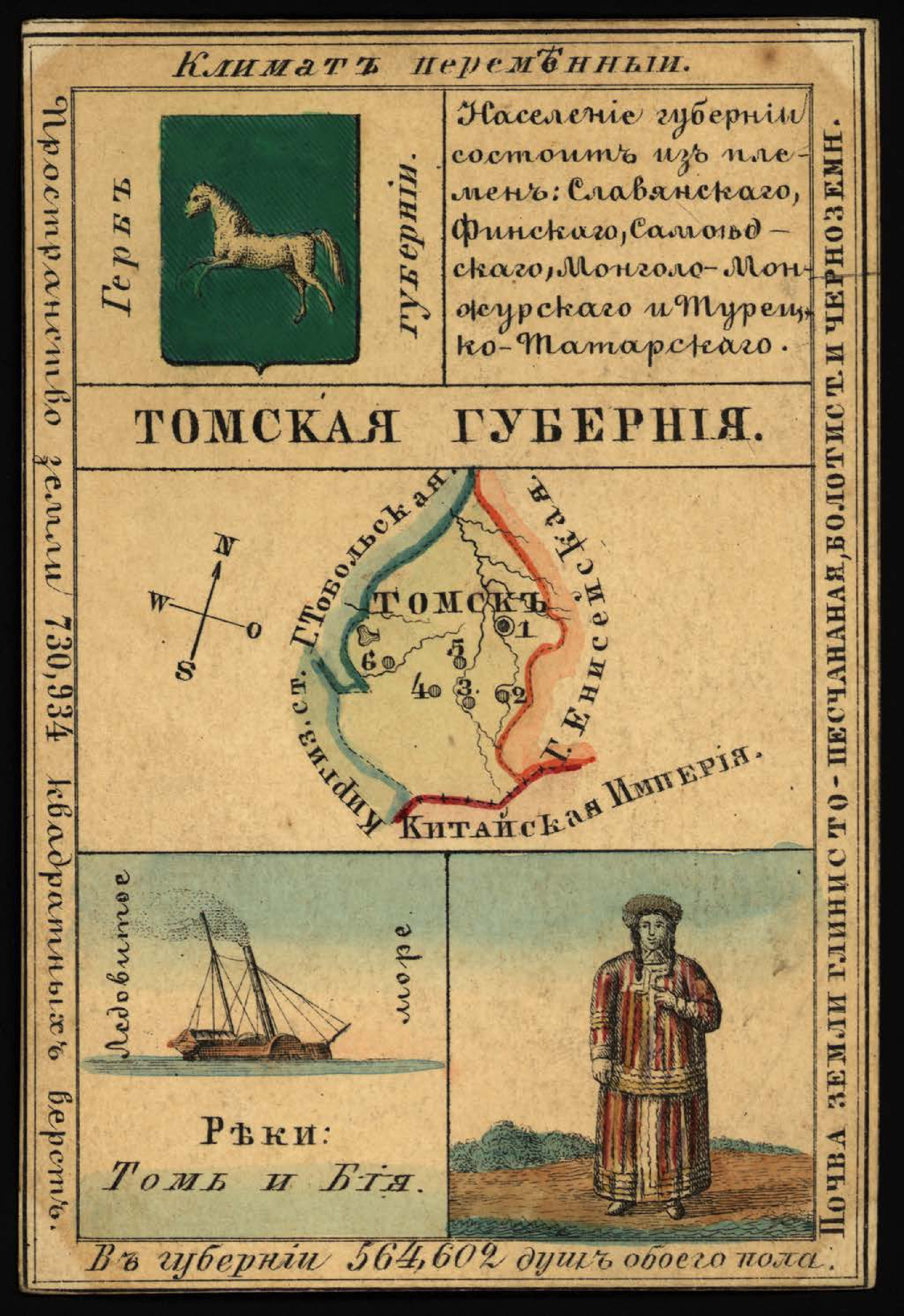
Card from set of geographical cards of the Russian Empire (1856)

=== 19th century ===
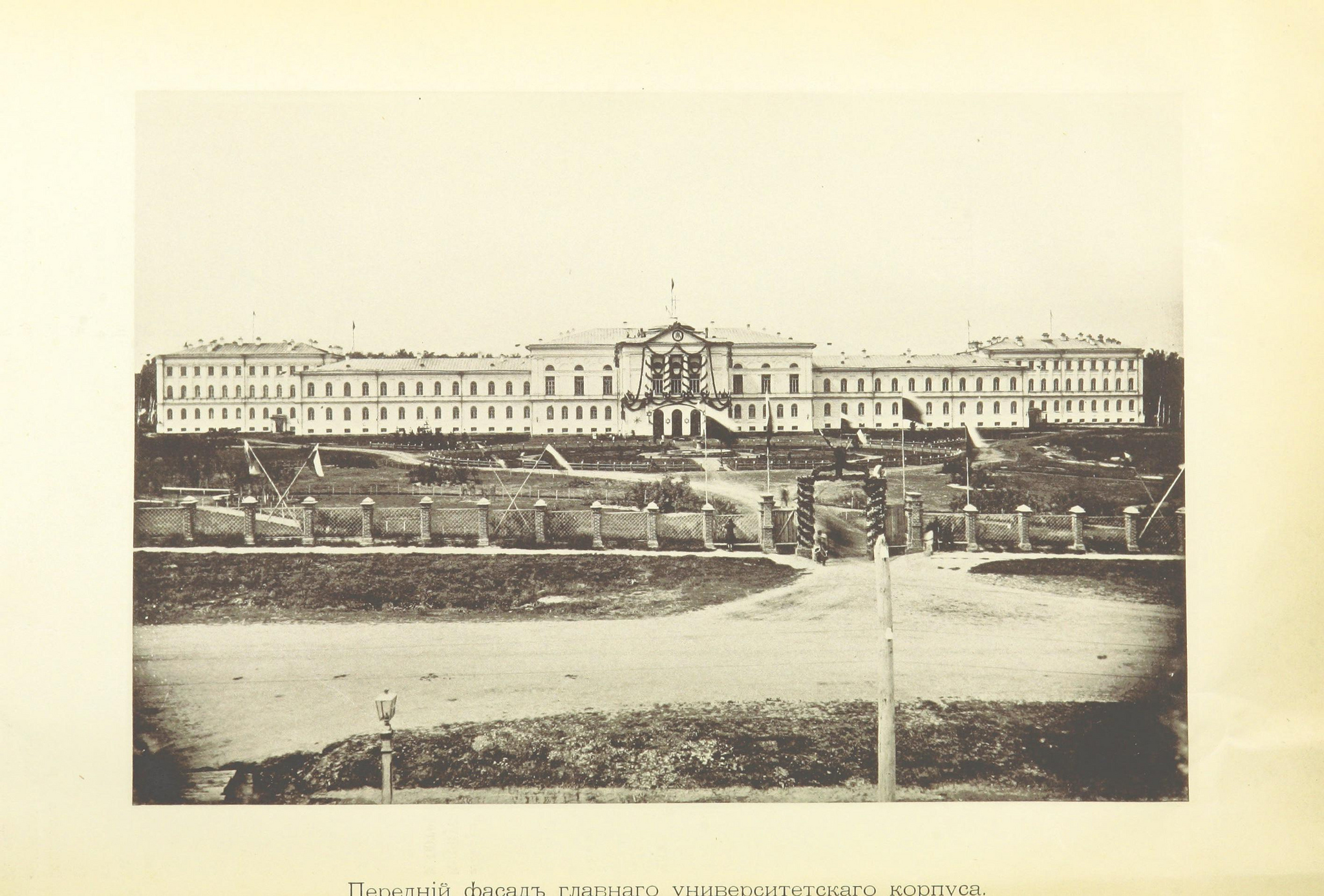
First university in Siberia (1889)

On February 26 (March 9), 1804, by decree of Emperor Alexander I, the Tobolsk Governorate was divided into two parts and the Tomsk Governorate was established.

The governorate included eight uezds (okrugs since 1898): Biysk Uezd, Yenisei Uezd, Kainskiy Uezd, Krasnoyarsky Uezd, Kuznetskiy Uezd, Narymsky Uezd, Tomsky Uezd, and Turukhansky Uezd.

On January 26 (February 7), 1822, as a result of the administrative reform under the project of Speransky, by the Decree of Alexander I "On the division of Siberia into two general governments", the Siberian General Governorate was divided into West-Siberian Governorate-General (Tobolsk Governorate, Tomsk Governorate and Tomsk Oblast) and East-Siberian Governorate-General. The Yeniseisk Governorate of the East-Siberian Governorate-General was separated from the Tomsk Governorate (the eastern territories of the Yeniseisk Uezd, the Krasnoyarsk Uezd, Turukhansk Uezd were separated) and the Omsk Oblast (the territories with the cities of Semipalatinsk and Ust-Kamenogorsk, Kolyvan Uezd), Narym Uezd is included in Tomsk Uezd. The lands of the Kolyvano-Voskresensky (Altai) mining district became part of the Tomsk Governorate, and the uezds were renamed okrugs.

In 1823 Tobolsk Governorate consisted of six okrugs: Barnaulsky, Kainsky, Kolyvansky, Kuznetsky, Tomsky, and Charyshsky.

On September 17 (September 29), 1827, the center of the Charyshsky okrug was transferred to the city of Biysk; the okrug was renamed Biysk okrug.

In 1838, with the founding of the provincial gymnasium, public education began to develop.

On April 6, 1838, when the Omsk Oblast was abolished, the cities of Semipalatinsk and Ust-Kamenogorsk were transferred to the Biysk okrug of the Tomsk Governorate.

In 1842, Pyotr Chikhachyov was charged by Nicholas I with a scientific expedition mission to the Altai mountains. He reached the sources of the rivers Abakan, Chu, and Chulyshman. Traveling across the Southern Altai, Chikhachyov reached undiscovered territories. He investigated also the Sayan Mountains. In the Northern Altai he found the richest coal deposits in the world, which he called the Kuznetsk Coal Basin. He also studied the culture, life, and customs of various nomadic and settled tribes of this region, having made in 1845 a geographical and geological description of these regions. His book includes illustrations by the noted Russian artist E. Mayer who traveled with him and Ivan Aivazovskii, of the steep valleys, deep lakes, and wide rivers typical of the area through which Chikhachev traveled.

On May 19 (May 31), 1854, part of the territory of the Tomsk Governorate with the cities of Semipalatinsk and Ust-Kamenogorsk was transferred to the Semipalatinsk Oblast.

On December 6 (December 18), 1856, the Kolyvan okrug was abolished and the new Kiysky okrug was formed.

November 1 (November 23), 1857, the Kiysky okrug was renamed the Mariinsky okrug.

1876 the Imperial Academy of Sciences sent Polyakov Ivan Semenovich on scientific travels to research in the Ob River valley, and in the summer of 1877 Polyakov was sent by the academy to the Kuznetsk Ridge (Mariinsky Uezd) to find the corpse of a mammoth (which turned out to be pieces of asbestos).

On May 16 (May 28), 1878, by order of the State Council of the Russian Empire, the first university in Siberia and Asia was founded in Tomsk.

On June 6 (June 18), 1894, part of the volosts was separated from the Biysk okrug with the formation of the Zmeinogorsk okrug.

On June 2 (June 14), 1898, the okrugs were renamed uezds.

=== 20th century ===
On June 17 (June 30), 1917, by decree of the Russian Provisional Government, the Altai Governorate was separated from the southern part of the Tomsk Governorate on the basis of the uezds of Barnaul, Biysk and Zmeinogorsk. From the eastern volosts of the Kainsky uezd, the Novonikolaevsky uezd was formed. The Togur (Narym) uezd was re-formed.

Soviet power on the territory of the Tomsk Uezd was established between December 1917 and March 1918.

On January 1 (14), 1918 part of the Kainsky Uezd was included in the newly formed Tatar Uezd of the Akmola oblast. On April 21, 1918, by decision of the Council of People's Commissars of the RSFSR, the Shcheglovsky Uezd was formed. Between July and August 1918, Tomsk Governorate came under the control of the White Army. On July 11, 1918, the Tomsk Governorate zemstvo council adopted a resolution on the formation of the Shcheglovsky uezd from January 1, 1919.

In December 1919 – January 1920 it was under the control of the Red Army. The administrative center of the Tomsk Governorate was moved to the city of Novonikolaevsk.

In April 1920, the government was returned to Tomsk.

On June 13, 1921, by decree of the All-Russian Central Executive Committee, the southwestern lands of the Tomsk Governorate, Kainsky Uezd and Novonikolaevsk Uezd were ceded to the newly created Novonikolaevsk Governorate.

On October 27, 1924, by decree of the All-Russian Central Executive Committee, the Kuznetsk Uezd and Shcheglovsky Uezd were merged into the Kolchuginsky Uezd. The same year, zoning was carried out in the districts of the Tomsk Governorate. By the beginning of 1925, the Tomsk Governorate included the Kolchuginsky, Mariinsky, Narymsky, and Tomsk Uezds.

On May 25, 1925, the Tomsk Governorate was abolished by a decree of the All-Russian Central Executive Committee; its territories became part of the Kuznetsk Okrug, the Tomsk Okrug, and partially the Achinsk Okrug of the Siberian Krai.

== Coat of arms of the Tomsk Governorate ==
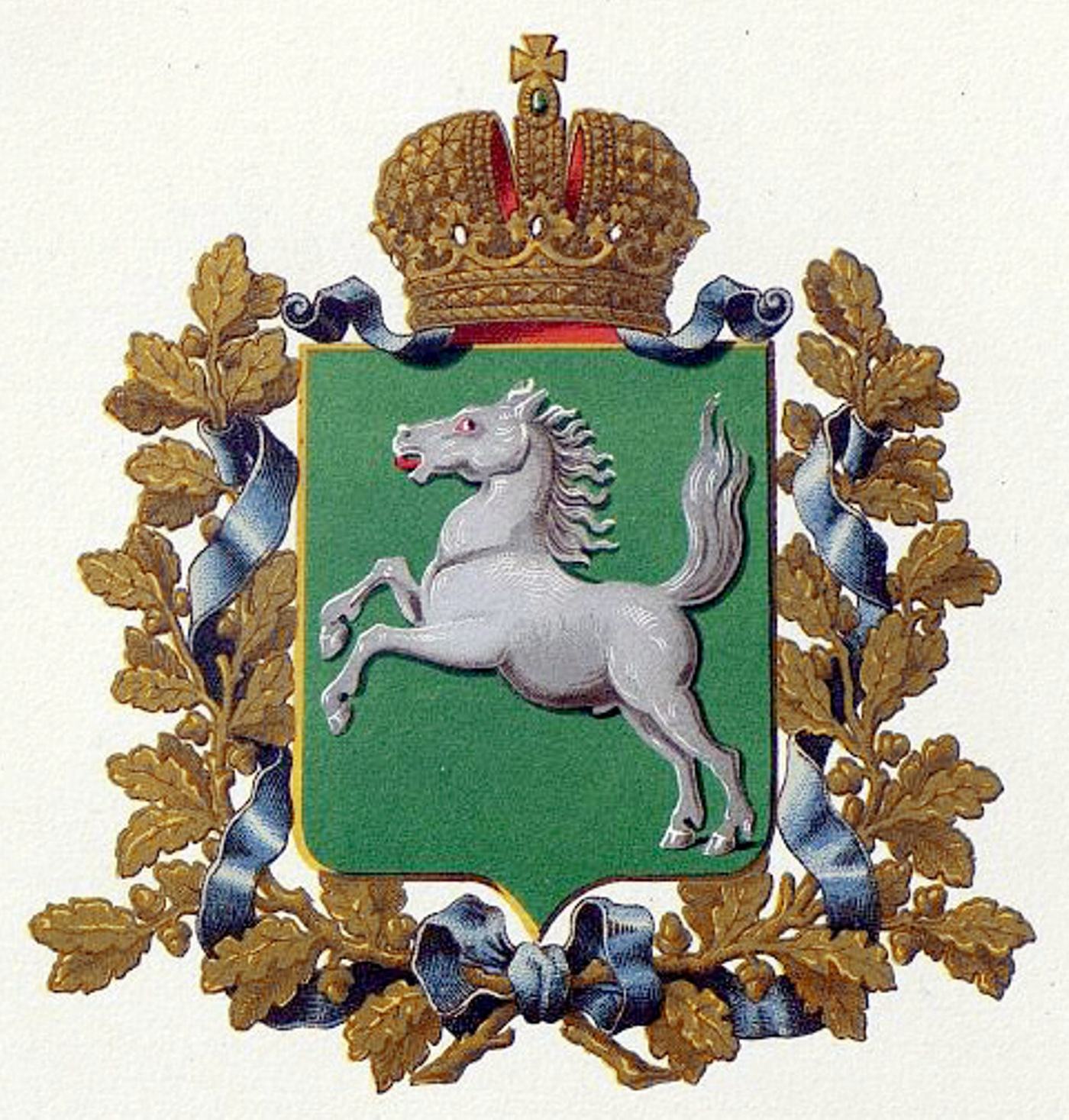
Coat of arms of the Tomsk Governorate, approved by Alexander II (1878)

The coat of arms of the Tomsk province was approved on July 5, 1878, by Alexander II.

In a green shield is a silver horse with scarlet eyes and a tongue. The shield is surmounted by the Imperial crown and surrounded by golden oak leaves connected by the ribbon of St. Andrew.

== Administrative division ==
By the end of the 19th century, the Tomsk Governorate was divided into seven uezds, which were in turn subdivided into volosts.

In the period of the 19th and 20th centuries, the Tomsk Governorate included uezds (years in the Governorate are indicated in brackets):

- Tomsky (1804–1925)
- Barnaul (1804–1917)
- Biyskiy (1804–1917)
- Yeniseisk (1804–1822)
- Kainsky (1804–1925)
- Kansky (1804–1822)
- Kolyvansky (1804–1827)
- Krasnoyarsk (1804–1827)
- Kuznetsky (1804–1925)
- Turukhansky (1804–1822)
- Mariinsky (1822–1925)
- Zmeinogorsky (1894–1917)
- Togursky (Narymsky) (1917–1925)
- Novo-Nikolaevsky (1917–1921)
- Shcheglovsky (1921–1924)
- Kolchuginsky (1924–1925)

No.	Uezd	Uezd town (population)	Coat of arms uezd town	Area, sq. verst	Population (1897), people
1	Barnaulsky Uezd	Barnaul (21073)		106,689.4	584,100
2	Biysk Uezd	Biysk (17,213 )		169,256.3 (area of both uezd)	337,007
3	Zmeinogorsky Uezd	Zmeinogorsk (7,378 )		169,256.3 (area of both uezd)	242,718
4	Kainsky Uezd	Kainsk (5,884)		67,518.3	187,147
5	Kuznetsky Uezd	Kuznetsk (3,117)		81,634.2	161,799
6	Mariinsky Uezd	Mariinsk (8,216)		71,442.1	137,773
7	Tomsky Uezd	Tomsk (52,210)		248,036.4	277,135

=== Uezdless towns ===
Included in	No.	Town	Coat of arms uezd town	Population (1897)
Tomsky Uezd	1	Kolyvan		12,000
Tomsky Uezd	2	Narym		1,129
Tomsky Uezd	3	Novonikolaevsk		8,000

== Population ==
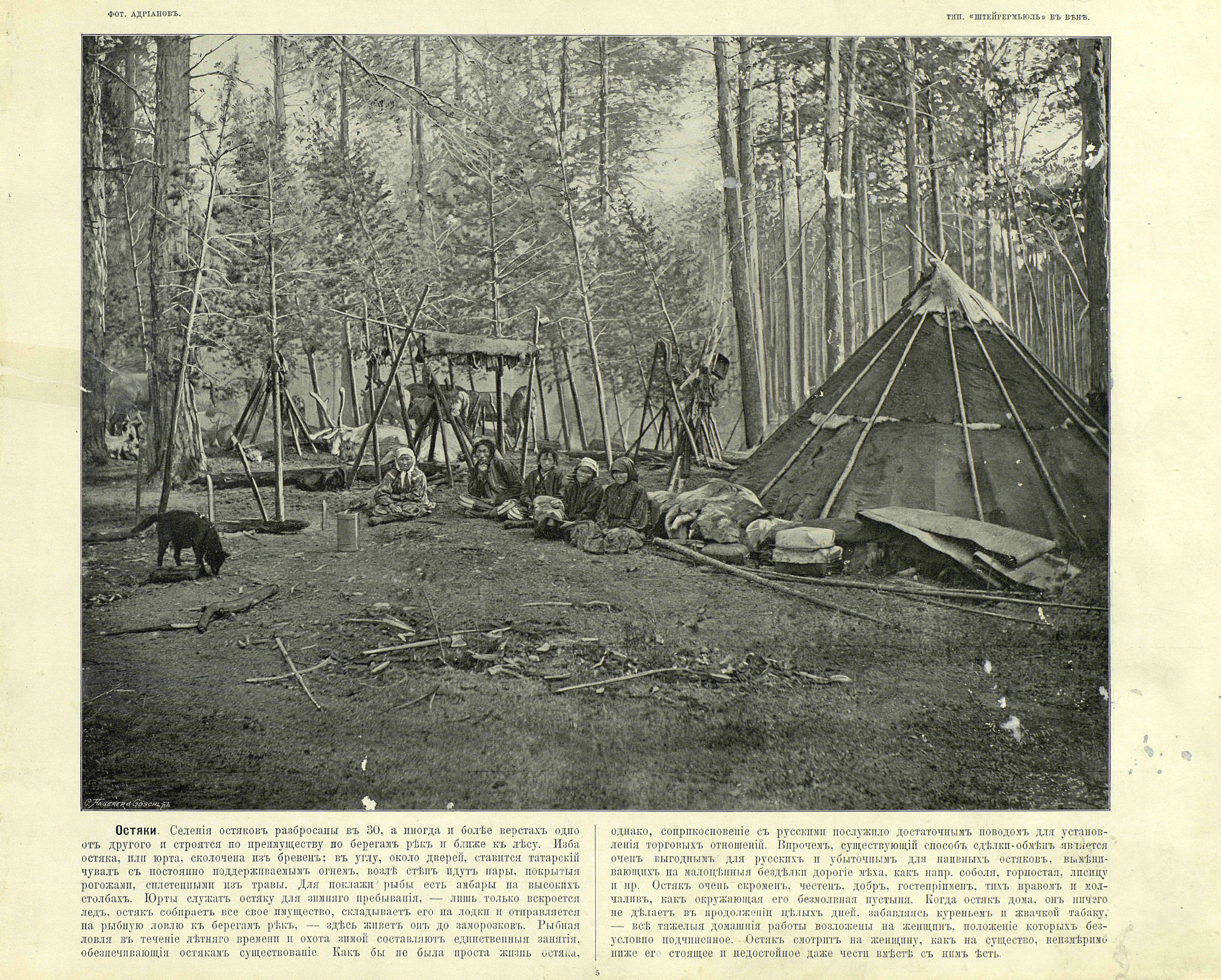
Ostyaks (1899)

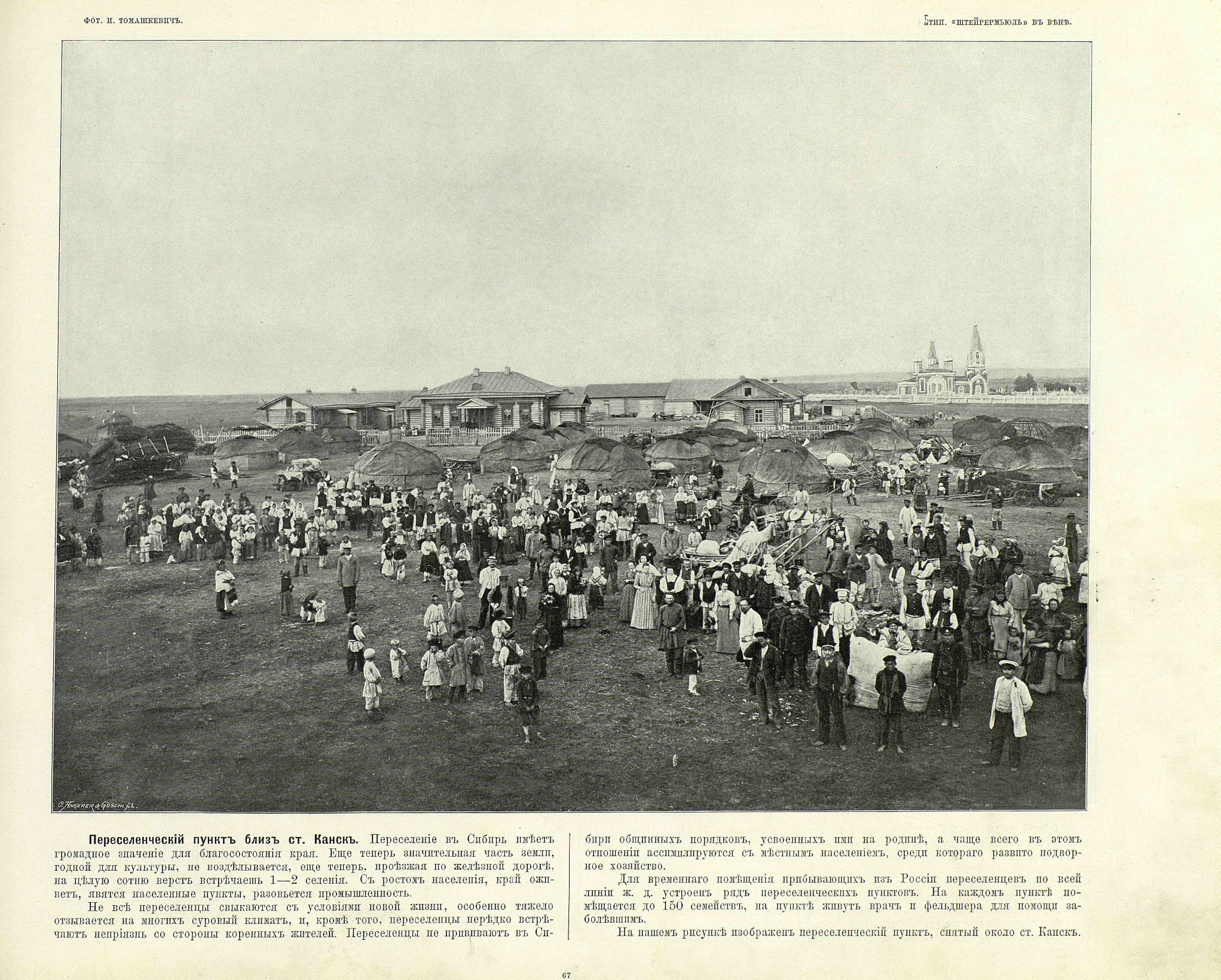
Resettlement point near the station Kansk (1899)

From the beginning of the 19th century, Tomsk Governorate was a place of exile.

A significant increase in population is due to the fact that the Tomsk Governorate was the main region of agrarian resettlement in Siberia.

In 1905, the population of the province was 2,327,500 people, and the area was 847,328 km^{2} (327,155 sq mi).

	Population									
	1804	1824	1897		1905		1 sq. verst		1914	1923
Area sq. meters			Total	Towns	Total	Towns	1897	1905		
744,576.7	230,000–250,000	396,300	1,927,679	127,931	2,327,500	147,000	2.6	3.1	4,000,000	1,000,000

The ethnographic composition of the population of the province is diverse: there are Great Russians (majority), Aesti, Chuvash people, Zyryans, Ostyaks and Ostyak-Samoyeds, Chulym, Baraba, Kuznetsk, Black Tatars and Bukharians, Telengits or Teleuts, and former Kalmyks-Dvoedans. 90% of the population is Slavic.

== Economy ==
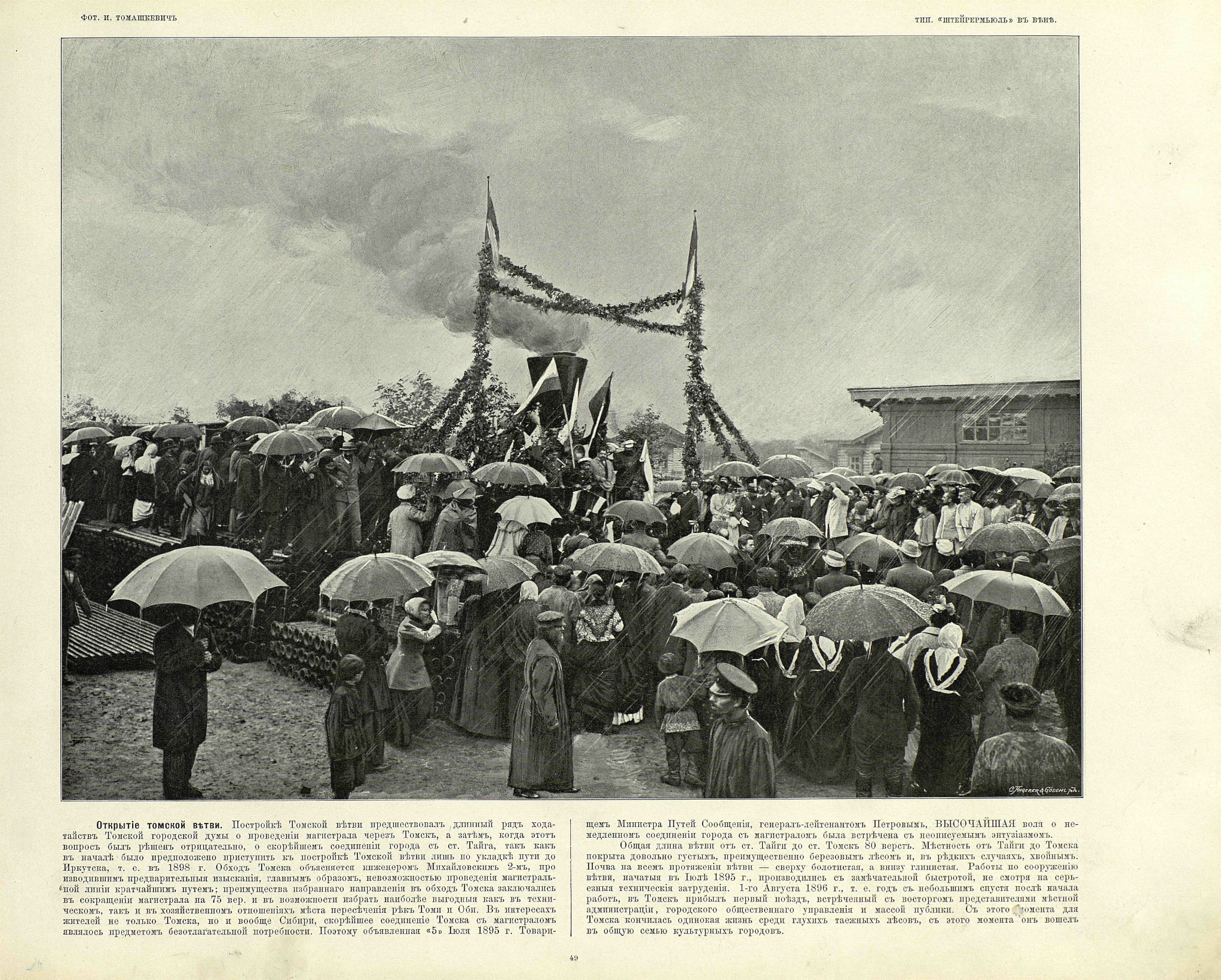
Opening of the Tomsk railway line (1899)

The main occupation of the population is agriculture. The main crops are wheat, oats, rye, barley, buckwheat, potatoes, flax, and hemp. The system of field cultivation is fallow-fallow. In many areas of the Altai okrug, the cultivation of grain is possible only under the condition of artificial irrigation. In part, modern irrigation channels represent the restored irrigation structures of the peoples who previously lived here – the Chinese and that people, the monuments of which are numerous stone mounds, kurgan stelae (baba), petroglyphs on rocks, etc., scattered throughout the Altai Mountains. In part, irrigation channels of later origin were built by the Kalmyks themselves as they increasingly began to move to agriculture.

Animal husbandry developed. In the Biysk Uezd, deer (mountain deer, Cervus maral) are bred. Beekeeping played an important role, although it was carried out very irrationally. Part of the bee products is sent to the Irbit Fair. In addition to apiary beekeeping, there is also honey hunting. Fisheries also developed. Fishing is the main occupation of inorodtsy and partly of Russians. Hunting and birding is in decline due to an increase in population, forest fires and the merciless extermination of animals and birds. Of the birds, mainly the hazel grouse comes into trade.

The cedar nut trade exists in the same areas where hunting is carried out. The nut is sold partly to Tomsk, partly to the Irbit, Ivanovo-Krestovsky and Ishimsky and other fairs, as well as abroad. The berry trade is important, especially lingonberries.

In the governorate, grain, fish, salt, wine, lard, honey, wax, leather, pine nuts and furs were produced and delivered to other parts of the country and abroad.

Tomsk Governorate was the main producer of Siberian butter.

The mining and metallurgical industry in the Altai mining district has been developed since the time of Demidov, the Dimidov mines and factories came under the jurisdiction of the Cabinet. Silver smelting is carried out at the Suzunsky plant. The gold industry and the factory business have recently (1901) fallen into decline. Coal is developed in the Bachatsky, Afoninsky and Kolchuginsky deposits, Sudzhenskaya and Anzherskaya mines of the Kuznetsk coal basin.

The salt industry is poorly developed. Salt goes on sale in the Tobolsk and Yeniseisk Governorates, and Glauber's salt goes to soda and glass factories.

In the 1840s steamboat traffic began along the rivers Ob, Tom, and Chulym.

From 1901 to 1903, the Chuisky tract was built. Traffic is open on the railway lines that passed through the Tomsk province:

- Chelyabinsk–Omsk–Novonikolaevsk (1896)
- Ob (Novonikolaevsk)–Krasnoyarsk (1898) of the Trans-Siberian Railway
- Taiga–Cheremoshniki (Tomsk) (1898)
- Novonikolaevsk–Semipalatinsk (1915)
- Barnaul–Biysk (1915)
- Yurga–Topki–Proyektnaya (1916)
- Topki–Kemerovo (1916)
- Tatar–Slavgorod (1917).

Doctors in the governorate in 1898 numbered one hundred and twenty, with four female doctors and seven dentists. There were twenty-two pharmacies and one balneary. There were six children's shelters for orphans and the children of migrants. All educational institutions totaled 1350, including 90 in towns. There were 54,714 students in total, of which only 12,000 were girls.

== Notable people ==
Born in the governorate:

- Ivan Pyryev (1901–1968)
- Vera Volkova (1905–1975)
- Tatiana Proskouriakoff (1909–1985)
- Yegor Ligachyov (1920–2021)
- Innokenty Smoktunovsky (1925–1994)
