= East Siberian Krai =

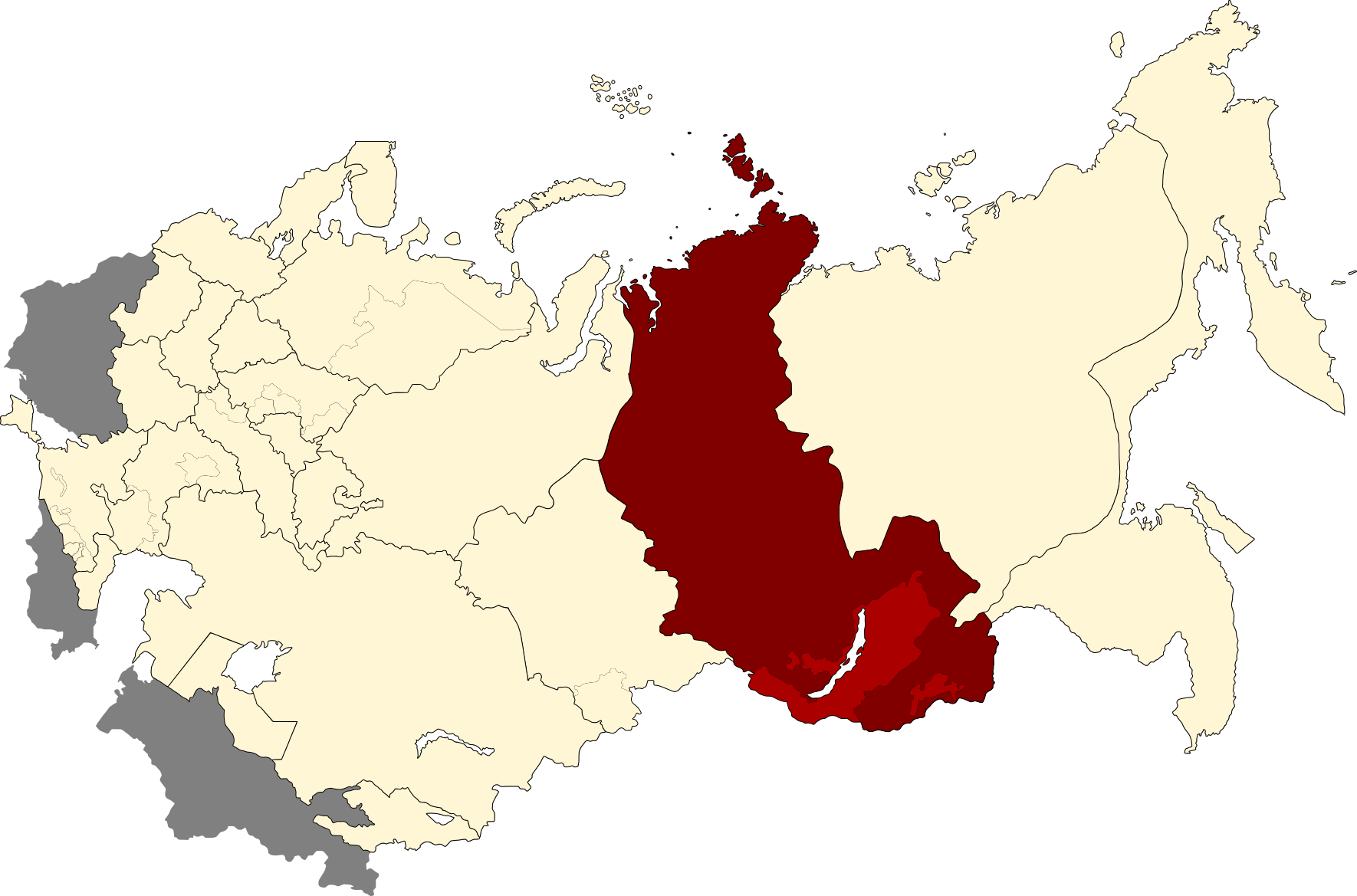

East Siberian Krai (Russian: Восточно-Сибирский край) is an administrative-territorial unit in the RSFSR, which existed from July 30, 1930, to December 5, 1936.

The administrative center is the city of Irkutsk.

== History ==
On July 30, 1930, as a result of breakdown, the Siberian Krai was divided into the East Siberian and West Siberian territories. In addition, the Chita and Sretensky Okrug and the Far Eastern Krai and the Buryat-Mongolian ASSR were transferred to the newly formed East Siberian Krai.

The administrative-territorial structure of the Krai was repeatedly subject to change.

On December 10, 1930, the Taimyr (Dolgano-Nenets), Evenki and Vitimo-Olyokminsky national okrugs were formed on its territory.

On August 11, 1930, the Presidium of the All-Russian Central Executive Committee decreed: “To include in the East Siberian Territory the entire territory of the Krasnoyarsk Okrug with the city of Krasnoyarsk".

In 1931 the East Siberian region consisted of 95 districts, 1,890 village councils, 18 cities and 15 workers' settlements.

In March 1934, a decision was made to create the Chita Oblast as part of the East Siberian Krai.

On December 7, 1934, the Krasnoyarsk Krai was separated from the East Siberian and West Siberian Krais, and included the Khakass Autonomous Oblast, Taimyr and Evenki national okrugs. On the same day, the Chita Oblast was abolished.

As of May 1, 1936, the area of the East Siberian Territory was 1,791 thousand km^{2}, it included 68 districts, 15 cities, 30 workers' settlements, 7 urban-type settlements, 1,244 village councils. In 1933, the population was 2,183 thousand people, the proportion of the urban population was 29.8%.

On December 5, 1936, the East Siberian Territory was abolished, the territory was divided between the East Siberian Oblast and the Buryat-Mongolian ASSR.

== Economy ==
Economically, the East Siberian region was an important fuel and raw materials region. During the industrialization of the 1930s, the region's economy experienced rapid growth. From 1931 to 1934, gold mining more than doubled, and coal mining increased by 88%. New coal mines were commissioned, and existing ones were reconstructed. The development of tin deposits in Transbaikalia in 1932 laid the foundation for the creation of the domestic tin industry. In the same year, construction began on enterprises for the extraction and processing of polymetallic ores in the Norilsk area. New machine-building enterprises and large thermal power plants were built. Logging and woodworking developed at a rapid pace.

During the collectivization, the kolkhozes became the main producers of agricultural products in the region. By the beginning of 1932, they included 56% of peasant households, by mid-1935 – 82%. In the early 1930s, collectivization led to a decrease in the volume of agricultural production, especially noticeable in livestock farming. The number of horses in the East Siberian region in 1933 decreased by 49% compared to 1929, cattle – by 56%, sheep and goats – by 71%, pigs – by 61%. In 1934, the restoration of agriculture began. At the beginning of 1935, there were 55 Machine and tractor stations, 27 state farms operating in the region. At the same time, the level of development of agricultural production as a whole remained low.

== See also ==
- History of the administrative-territorial division of the RSFSR

== Literature ==
- Districts of the East Siberian Territory in figures: Stat. handbook. Irkutsk, 1930
- Materials for the report of the organizing committee of the All-Russian Central Executive Committee of the East Siberian Territory to the 1st regional congress of Soviets. Irkutsk, 1931
- Pakhomov Ya. Z. Eastern Siberia from the First to the Second Congress of Soviets: Report of the executive committee to the second congress of Soviets of the East Siberian Territory, January 3, 1935. Moscow; Irkutsk, 1935
- East Siberian Territory in Figures. (Within New Borders): Brief Stat. Reference. Irkutsk, 1935; Socialist Construction of the USSR: Annual. M., 1936.
