= West Siberian Krai =

Early krai of Russian SFSR

West Siberian Krai Западно-Сибирский край (Russian)
- Krai of the Soviet Union
- 1930–1937

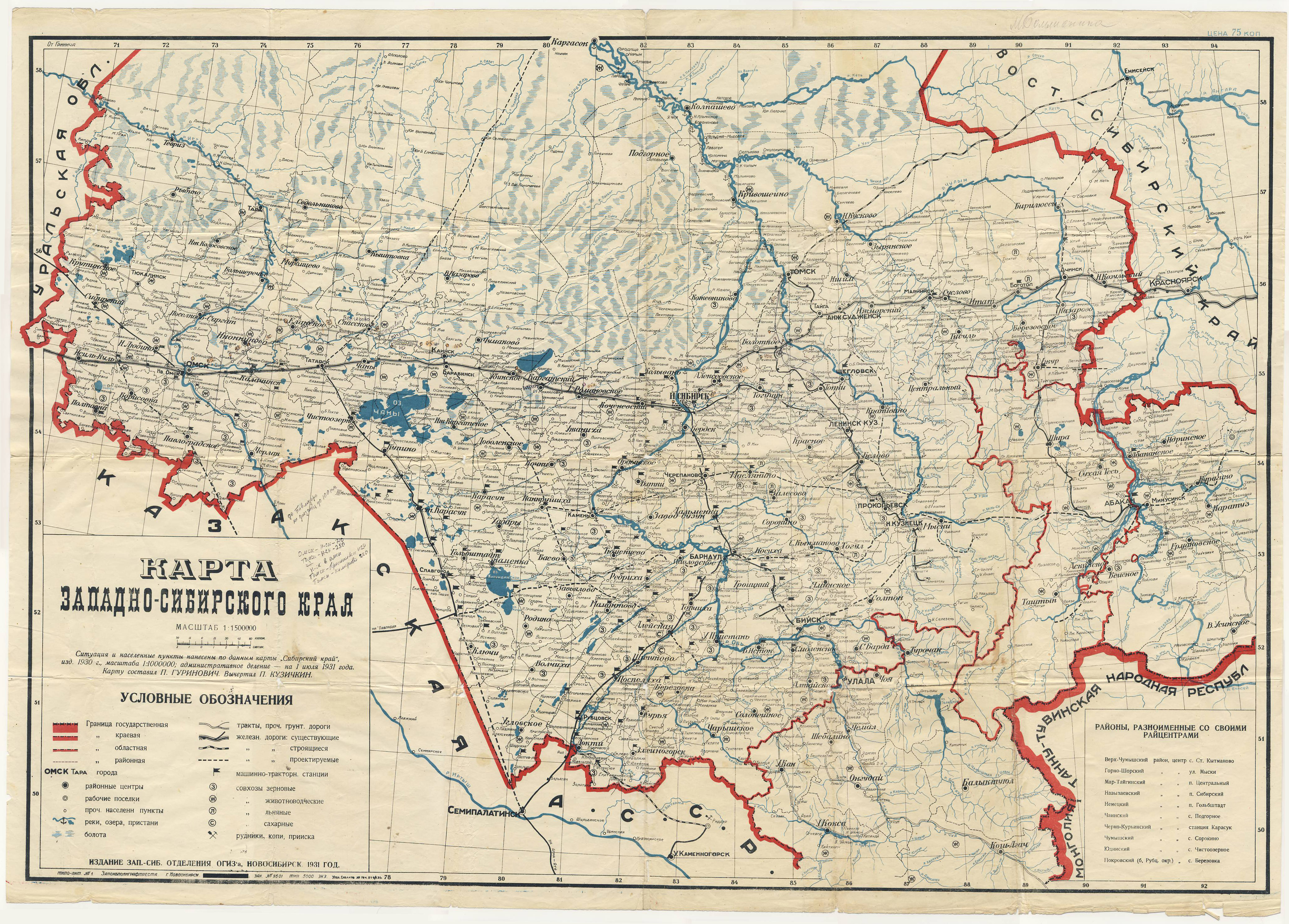
- Map of West Siberian Krai, 1931.
- Capital: Novosibirsk
- Area
  - 1930: 1,263,500 km^{2} (487,800 sq mi)
- Population
  - 1930: 8,114,990
  - 1937: 6,433,527
- History
  - Established: 30 July 1930
  - Disestablished: 28 September 1937
- Political subdivisions: 1 okrug 1 autonomous oblast
Preceded by
Soviet Union
Siberian Krai
Succeeded by
Soviet Union
Novosibirsk Oblast
Altai Krai

West Siberian Krai (Russian: Западно-Сибирский край, Zapadno-Sibirsky Krai) was an early krai of the Russian SFSR, created after the split of the Siberian Krai in 1930. By the 1937 All-Union Census, it had population of 6,433,527.

Krai's center was the Novosibirsk city.

== History ==
The krai was established by the decree of the All-Russian Central Executive Committee (VTsIK) on July 30, 1930, through the division of the Siberian Krai into a western part, with its center in Novosibirsk, and an eastern part, with its center in Irkutsk.

The West Siberian Krai included 14 okrugs of the former Siberian Krai and the Oirotskaya Autonomous Oblast.

Originally, the territory of the Krasnoyarskiy Okrug was also part of the krai. However, despite Krasnoyarsk's geographical location in Western Siberia at the time, it was transferred to the East Siberian Krai by a decree of the VTsIK Presidium on August 11, 1930.

West Siberian Krai's land area was 1,263,500 km^{2}, with a population of 8,114,990 people (including 1,294,100 urban residents). It comprised 172 districts (15 districts in Khakassia and Oirotia), 4,390 rural councils, and 18,570 settlements (including 24 cities, 10 workers' settlements, and 4 holiday villages).
