= Vitim-Olyokma National Okrug =

National district within Kalinin Oblast of the RSFSR (1937–1939)

Coordinates: 57°07′N 35°28′E

Vitimo-Olyokminsky National Okrug Витимо-Олёкминский национальный округ
- National Okrug of the Soviet Union
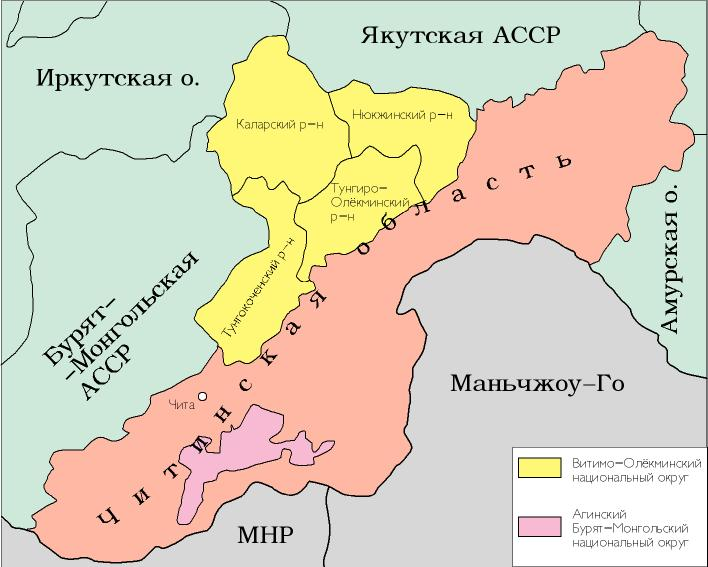
- Vitim-Olyokma National Okrug on the map of the Chita Oblast
- Capital: Kalakan
- History
  - Established: December 10, 1930
  - Disestablished: September 21, 1938
- Political subdivisions: 4 districts

The Vitim-Olyokma National Okrug (Russian: Витимо-Олёкминский национальный округ, Vitimo-Olyokminsky natsionalny okrug), was one of the national okrugs of the USSR, formed by the decree of the Central Executive Committee on December 10, 1930, as part of the East-Siberian Krai. After September 26, 1937, it was assigned to the Chita Oblast, and was abolished on September 21, 1938. The center of the national okrug was at first determined to be the village of Ust-Muya, but after November 1933 it was moved to the village of Kalakan, at the mouth of the Kalakan river.

== Geography ==
The national okrug was located between the Vitim and Olyokma rivers, from where it gets its name. It occupied the northern part of today's Zabaykalsky krai and the northwestern part of the Tynda raion of today's Amur oblast.

== History ==
It was organized in the area of native residence of Evenks. The okrug included:

- from the East-Siberian krai: the southern end of the Bodaybinsky district, the so-called Kalarsky corner, and the Vitimo-Karengsky native district;
- from the Yakut ASSR: the territory in the area of the Nyukzha and Olyokma rivers, the so-called Tupikovsky native district.

The village of Ust-Muya was designated the temporary center of the okrug. Later, on November 15, 1933, the center was moved to the village of Kalakan.

On September 26, 1937, based on the Resolution of the Central Executive Committee of the USSR the Vitim-Olyokma national okrug was assigned to the Chita oblast.

By the Resolution of the Organizing Committee of the Supreme Soviet of the RSFSR dated 21 September 1938, it was liquidated and its districts were transferred to the direct subordination of the Chita oblast.

== Governance ==
In 1931, the Orgburo of the East Siberian Regional Committee of the All-Union Communist Party (Bolsheviks) for the Vitim-Olyokma national okrug was created. In March 1932, the 1st Okrug Party Conference was held. The Okrug Committee exercised leadership over the territorial (Kalarsky, Tungiro-Olyokminsky, Tungokochensky, Nyukzhinsky and Vitim-Karenga) and goldfield (Blyukherovsky and named after 11 October) Raion Committees of the All-Union Communist Party (Bolsheviks). The structure of the Okrug Committee included organizational, cultural and propaganda, and agitation and mass departments.

In April 1932, the district committee of the Komsomol was created. The committee consisted of 5 departments: organizational, cultural and educational, military and physical education, political education, and pioneers.

== Administrative division ==
As of October 1, 1931, the okrug was divided into 4 raions:

Raion	Center	Number of settlements	Population as of January 1, 1931	Area in thousand km^{2}.	Notes
Vitimo-Olyokminsky	Trading post "Talochi" on the Karenga river (temporarily)	3 rural	548	28,0	In some maps it is named "Vitim-Karenga"
Kalarsky	Workers' settlement named after 11 October (temporarily)	1 workers' settlement and 5 rural	3275	66,7	-
Machinsky	Khimolkho	-	-	-	Contrary to what the decree on the formation of the national okrug states, the territory of the Machinsky raion remained a part of the Bodaybinsky district of the East-Siberian krai, but for some time, the district was listed as part of the Vitim-Olyokma national okrug
Tupikovsky	Village of Tupik	2 rural	1170	115,1	According to the Regional Executive Committee, by October 1, 1931, it was renamed Tungiro-Olyokminsky.

During 1932 and 1933, number of administrative changes took place. On November 15, 1933, the Kyker village council was transferred from the Olinsk raion of the East-Siberian krai to the Vitim-Olyokma national okrug. As a result, by 1934 the administrative division of the okrug took the following form:

Raion	Center	Number of settlements	Population as of January 1, 1931	Area in thousand km^{2}.	Notes
Kalarsky	village of Chara	3 rural and 1 village	2400	66,7	Центр района перенесён в Чару в 1932 году
Nyukzhinsky	workers' settlement of Blyukherovsk	2 rural and 1 village	1800	35,0	Formed in 1933
Tungokochensky	village of Tungokochen	4 rural and 1 village	2600	38,0	Former Vitimo-Olyokminsky (Vitim-Karenga) raion
Tungiro-Olyokminsky	locality of Nyatno	4 rural	2200	80,1	former Tupikovsky

== Population ==
As of 1 January 1931, the national okrug had a population of 9,240. 2,000 (22%) of the population was urban and 7,240 (78%) was rural and nomadic. In the mid-1930s, there were three workers' settlements in the district: 11 October (status granted in 1930), Kalakan and Blukherovsk (both granted status in 1933). By 1 January 1936, the population reached 10.4 thousand people. The population was dominated by Russians and Evenks. There were also about 250 Yakuts.

== Economy and Culture ==
The majority of the population was engaged in gold mining, reindeer herding, and fur harvesting. The okrug was subsidized.

The district committee of the All-Union Communist Party (Bolsheviks) and the Komsomol carried out work on sedentarization of the Evenk nomads, collectivization of agriculture, introduction of “cultural” (non-nomadic) livestock farming and crop farming into the life of the natives, development of hunting, research and development of natural resources (mainly gold). Socialist competitions with the Taymyr National Okrug were organized.

The natural resources of the okrug were practically unexplored. Thus, the paleontologist and writer Ivan Yefremov wrote: “In Eastern Siberia there is the Vitim-Olekminsky National Okrug… The inaccessibility and desolation of these places is exceptional. Until very recently, travelers had not been here… I had to be the first to cross this blank spot on the map…”.

The local handicraft industry produced goods worth 115 thousand rubles.

The development of agriculture was complicated by the weak development of agricultural technology, low crop yields (due to the harsh climate), and low livestock productivity. The bulk (85%) of the sown areas were in the Tungokochensky raion. Vegetable crops were grown in greenhouses. According to data from the beginning of 1934, there were 8 thousand reindeer in the district, including 1.5 thousand in collective farms and 6.5 thousand in private farms. There were 838 people in 13 collective farms.

In 1933, furs were procured for 515 thousand rubles, and in 1934 - for 563 thousand. Fish in 1934 was procured for 73 thousand rubles, game - for 86 thousand, pine nuts - for 62 thousand, medicinal raw materials - for 20 thousand, other wild plants - for 58 thousand, field products - for 140 thousand.

Cargo was delivered to the district only in winter by horse from the railway stations of Chita, Nerchinsk and Mogocha. The average delivery time for cargo was 70–80 days.

As of January 1, 1934, there were 33 retail outlets in the national okrug.

According to data from 1933 and 1934, 53.8% of the native population in the okrug were literate. During the same period, there were 13 primary schools (in 1926 there was only one) with 880 pupils. 100% of children of the appropriate ages attended primary school. Several hundred people attended literacy courses.

The district published the newspaper “Vitimo-Olekminskaya Pravda”, where some of the materials were published in the Evenki language.
