= East Siberian Oblast =

East Siberian oblast
- 1936–1937
- Capital: Irkutsk
- Demonym: East Siberian
- Population
  - 1937: 1,897,049
- History
  - Established: 5 December 1936
  - Disestablished: 26 September 1937
Preceded by	Succeeded by
East Siberian Krai	Irkutsk Oblast; Chita Oblast

The East Siberian Oblast was an early oblast of the Russian Soviet Federative Socialist Republic, which existed from December 5, 1936 to September 26, 1937. It was created when the East Siberian Krai was divided into the East Siberian Oblast and the Buryat Autonomous Soviet Socialist Republic in 1936 and ceased to exist after being split into the Irkutsk Oblast and the Chita Oblast in 1937.

According to the 1937 All-Union Census, its population was 1,897,049 persons.

The Oblast was made up of 45 districts and its administrative centre was the city of Irkutsk.
