= Isa Zhaksymbayev =

Isa Zhaksybayev Sadir Uly (Russian: Иса Жаксыбаев, Kazakh: Иса Жақсыбаев; 1868–1938) was a rural Kazakh entrepreneur and community figure from the steppe aul of Koychubay, west of Omsk. He lived and worked during the transition of the Kazakhs of the Omsk region from a nomadic to a sedentary way of life, under the influence of settlers from European Russia and politics of Russian Empire.

Kazakh horsemen in the Russian Empire in the late 19th century.

During the Russian Civil War, from 1918 to 1919, he employed and sheltered the young First World War prisoner of war Josip Broz, who in the future would become known as Tito. Under Soviet rule, Isa was subjected to dekulakization and was eventually executed as a victim of Stalinist repression. He was posthumously rehabilitated.

== Biography ==
Isa Zhaksybayev is reported to have been born in 1868 in the nomadic aul of Koychubay (Koyshibay), whose winter settlements were located approximately 50 km southwest of Omsk in 1902, probably close to the location of the nowadays village.

He amassed his wealth through trading livestock. He worked as a drover, transporting livestock purchased on behalf of private traders at fairs around Kokshetau to Omsk, approximately 300 km away. Amid increased migration of peasants from European Russia to the steppes along the Irtysh River and the newly built Trans-Siberian Railway, as well as rapid economic development in the regional center of Omsk, Isa eventually began trading livestock on his own account.

=== Community status, lifestyle and wealth ===
Josip Broz, who met Zhaksybayev in 1918 and spent at least a year in the aul of Koychubay, claimed that Isa had "2,500 horses in the steppe". It remains unclear whether all these animals belonged to him or were part of the livestock trade he conducted on behalf of multiple clients.

Local newspaper reports from the early 1910s corroborate contemporary accounts that Zhaksymbayev held a certain judicial authority within the traditional system of people's courts responsible for resolving disputes among Kazakhs in administrative aul No. 3 of the Omsk Volost.

Zhaksybayev decided to invest his earnings in the construction of a steam-powered mill, which, according to his descendants, began operating in 1916 - a year before the Russian Revolution. He hired peasants from nearby Slavic villages to work at the mill and carry out other tasks, such as digging wells. In 1918, amid the Civil War, Zhaksybayev hired 25-year-old Josip Broz, then a fugitive Austro-Hungarian prisoner of war, as a mechanic to maintain his mill.

While the vast majority of rural Kazakhs still lived in traditional nomadic tents known as yurts, or in partially dug-in winter dwellings made of sod, Zhaksybayev had a "European-style house" built for himself. However, according to local oral traditions, he did not find it to his liking and returned to living in a yurt.

Isa Zhaksybayev also commissioned the construction of a mosque, reportedly with the assistance of businessman Tleukinov Zheksenbay. Isa and his fellow Kazakhs were Muslims. Josip Broz claimed that his host and employer had many wives and children. A transcription of a document from the 1930s, published on a memorial website, records that in his old age, when he was already subjected to Stalinist repression, Zhaksybayev had two wives, Baricha and Zhamilya, a son named Zhunus, and five grandchildren.
