= Siberian Krai =

Siberian Krai Сибирский край (Russian)
- Krai of the Soviet Union
- 1925–1930
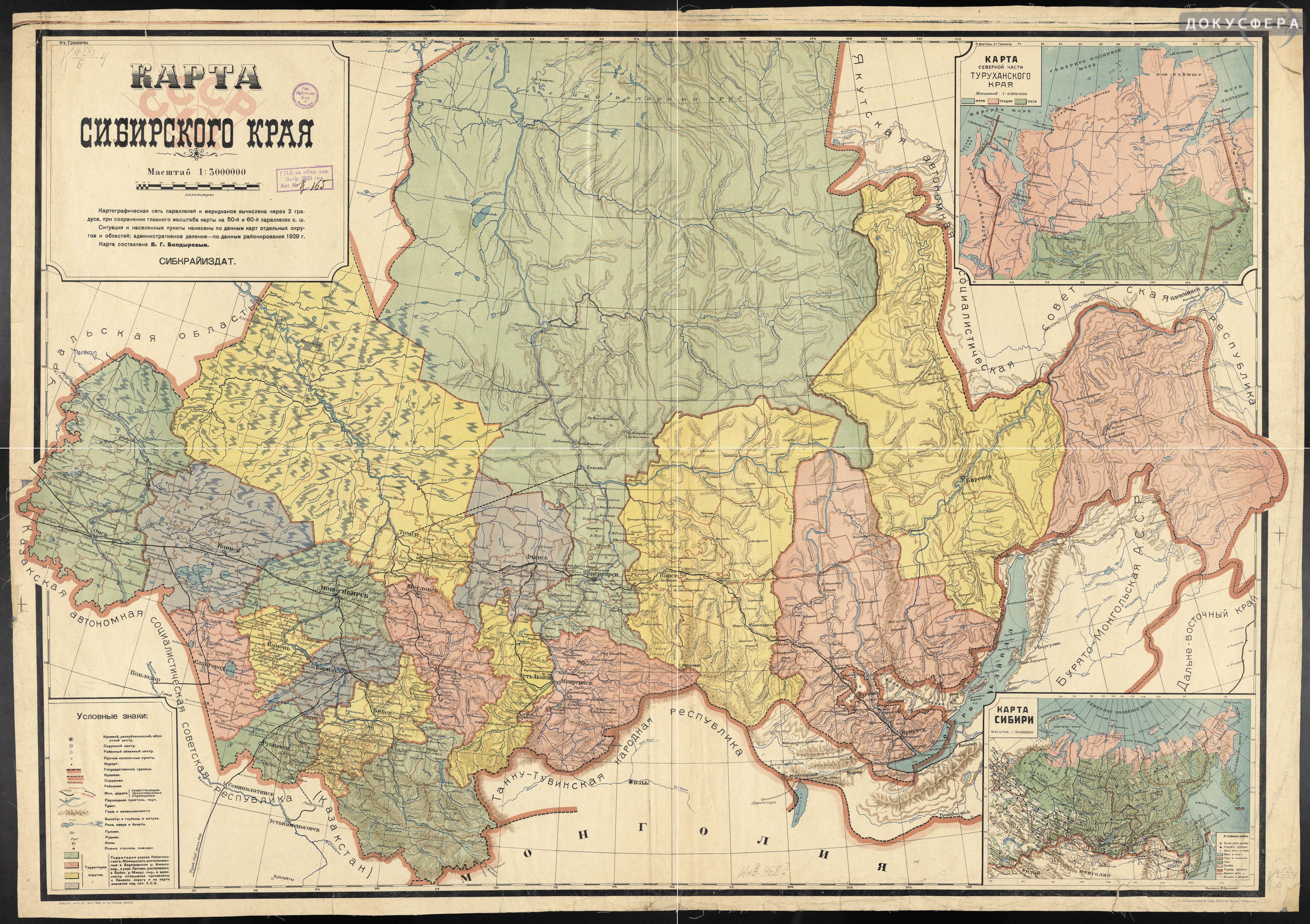
- Map of Siberian Krai, 1929.
- Capital: Novosibirsk
- Area
- 4,064,400 km^{2} (1,569,300 sq mi)
- Population
- 9,923,800
- History
  - Established: 25 May 1925
  - Disestablished: 30 July 1930
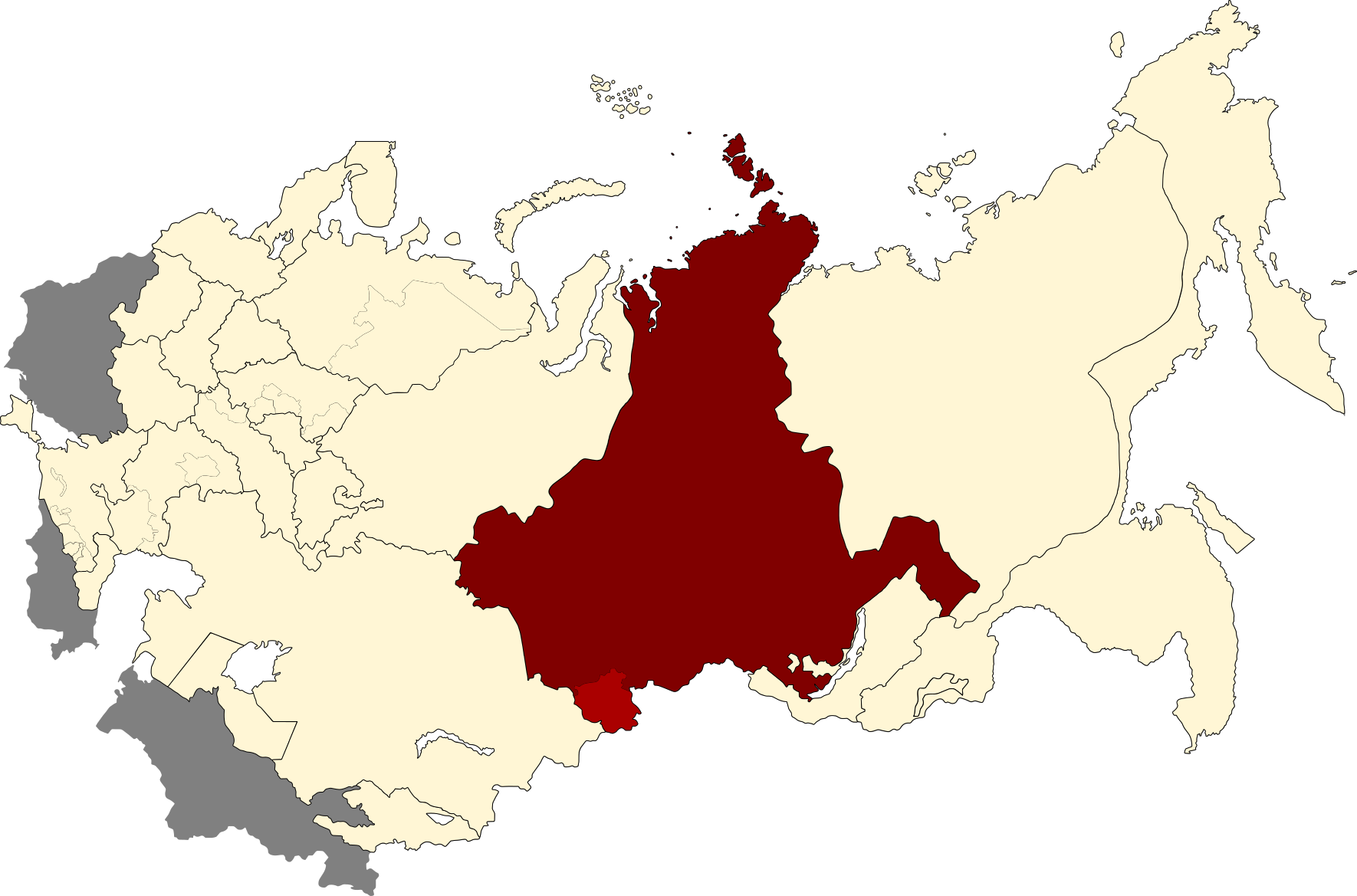
- Siberian Krai on the map of the RSFSR (July 20, 1930)
Preceded by
Soviet Union
Altai Governorate
Yeniseysk Governorate
Irkutsk Governorate
Novonikolayevsk Governorate
Omsk Governorate
Tomsk Governorate
Succeeded by
Soviet Union
West Siberian Krai
East Siberian Krai

Siberian Krai (Russian: Сибирский край, Sibirsky Kray) was a krai of the Russian SFSR. It existed from 1925 to 1930. The krai's administrative center was the city of Novosibirsk.

== History ==
Siberian Krai was formed on May 25, 1925 by the decree of the Central Executive Committee, with the center in the city of Novo-Nikolayevsk, renamed in 1926 to Novosibirsk. It replaced the Omsk, Novo-Nikolayevsk, Altai governorate, Tomsk and Yenisei governorates. The Oyrot autonomous oblast was also included in its composition, as well as the Irkutsk governorate, however it was initially subordinated to the regional bodies of the Siberian Krai and not divided into okrugs until 1926.

It was divided into okrugs and raions:

- The Tara okrug was formed within the Tara uyezd of the Omsk governorate with its center in the city of Tara, and included 10 raions. The Yelansky, Panovsky, and Tebendinsky rural councils of the abolished Zagvazdinsky raion of the Tobolsk okrug of the Ural oblast were annexed to the Ust-Ishimsky raion of the Tara okrug;
- The Omsk okrug was formed within the Omsk, Tyukalinsky, and Kalachinsky uyezds of the Omsk governorate with its center in the city of Omsk and included 21 raions;
- The Slavgorod okrug was formed within the Slavgorod uyezd of the Omsk governorate and the Aleksandrovsky raion of Tatar uyezd with its center in the city of Slavgorod; it included 13 raions;
- The Barabinsk okrug was formed within the Tatar uyezd of the Omsk governorate, the Kainsky uyezd of the Novo-Nikolaevskaya governorate, as well as the Ubinsky and Baklushevsky raions of the Kargatsky uyezd of the Novo-Nikolaevskaya governorate with its center in the city of Barabinsk, and included 17 raions;
- The Novo-Nikolaevsk okrug was formed within the Novo-Nikolaevsky uyezd of Novo-Nikolaevsk governorate, Kargatsky, Indersky, Chulymsky raions of Kargatsky uyezd and the Cherepanovsky, Maslyaninsky, Legostavsky raions of the Cherepanovsky uyezd with the center in the city of Novo-Nikolaevsk, included 20 raions;
- The Kamensk okrug was formed within the Kamensk uyezd of the Novo-Nikolaevsk governorate, Petropavlovsky and Kochkovsky raions of Kargatsky uyezd and the Bitkovsky raion of the Cherepanovsky uyezd with its center in the city of Kamen, and included 13 raions;
- The Barnaul okrug was formed within the Barnaul uyezd of the Altai governorate, Zalesovsky and Talmensky raions of the Cherepanovsky uyezd of the Novo-Nikolaevskaya governorate with its center in the city of Barnaul, and included 16 raions;
- The Biysk okrug was formed within the Biysk uyezd of the Altai governorate with its center in the city of Biysk and included 18 raions;
- The Tomsk okrug was formed within the Tomsk uyezd of Tomsk governorate, Zyryansky, Malo-Peschansky, Izhmersky, Troitsky, Mariinsky, Verkhne-Chebulinsky raions of the Mariinsky uyezd and the Narymsky krai with the center in the city of Tomsk, and included 24 raions;
- The Kuznetsk okrug was formed within the Kolchuginsky District of the Tomsk Governorate with its center in the village of Kolchugino and included 11 districts;
- The Achin okrug was formed within the Achinsk District of Yenisei Province, Mariinsky District (excluding 6 districts) of Tomsk Province with its center in the city of Achinsk, and included 13 districts;
- The Krasnoyarsk okrug was formed within the Krasnoyarsk district of the Yenisei province, the Balakhtinsky region of the Achinsky district of the Yenisei province, and the Turukhansk region with its center in the city of Krasnoyarsk, and included 12 districts;
- The Minusinsk okrug was formed within the Minusinsk uyezd of the Yenisei governorate with its center in the city of Minusinsk and included 8 raions;
- The Kansk okrug was formed within the Kansk uyezd of the Yenisei governorate with its center in the city of Kansk and included 13 raions;
- The Khakass okrug was formed within the Khakass uyezd of the Yenisei governorate with its center in the village of Ust-Abakansky and included 4 raions;
- The Rubtsovsk okrug was formed within the Rubtsovsky uyezd (excluding the western part of the Uglovsky raion) of the Altai governorate with the center in the village of Rubtsovsk, and included 8 raions;
- The Irkutsk governorate retained its subordination to the regional authorities of the Siberian krai until the issue of zoning the Far East and the creation of the Lena-Transbaikal oblast with its center in the city of Irkutsk was resolved, which included 4 districts and 26 regions;
- The Oyrot autonomous oblast was an independent administrative and economic unit with the rights granted to it by the decrees on its formation and subsequent legislation, remaining intact with its 10 aimaks.

In total, as of 1925, the Siberian krai included 16 okrugs, 221 raions, 1 autonomous oblast consisting of 10 aimaks and 1 governorate, consisting of 4 uezds and 26 raions.

On October 24, 1925, the Regulation on the Siberian Region was adopted.

By 1925, the territory of the region reached 4,428,700 km^{2}., the population was 8,245,700 people (7,316,900 of which lived in rural areas and 928,800 lived in urban areas).

As of January 1, 1926, the Siberian krai had a territory of 2,571,060 km^{2}, excluding the Turukhansk krai. The population was 7,880,346 people, there were 256 raions, 5,886 village councils and 18,822 settlements. The norm for village councils was considered to be a seven-verst radius and 600 residents.

National composition of the population of the Siberian krai (according to the 1926 census):

Nationality	Population	Nationality	Population
Russians	6 767 892	Buryats*	13 693
Ukrainians	827 536	Ostyaks	8188
Belarusians	320 320	Ostyak-Samoyeds	1595
Poles	45 854	Samoyeds	1221
Latvians	26 828	Yuraks	2114
Latgalians	8191	Altai	40 570
Germans	78 798	Teleuts	1897
Jews	32 766	Telengits	3415
Estonians	29 890	Kumandins	6344
Zyryans	12 458	Shors	12 568
Permians	8545	Karagash*	414
Votyaks	6418	Dolgans	699
Mordvins	107 794	Yakuts	3385
Chuvash	48 011	Tungus	7948
Tatars*	96 135	Yeniseis	1427
Bashkirs	2194	Kazakhs	48 392
Romani	7200	Khakas	45 591
Chinese	1409	Soyots	68
Finns	1606	Mongols	277

- The list included Tatars, divided into Irtysh, Barabinsk, Tomsk, Kuznetsk, Meles (but were not registered separately during the census).
- In 1927, about 1,000 Buryats moved to the krai after the transfer of the Kabansky aimak to the Buryat-Mongolian ASSR.
- The census includes the Karagash of the Kansk okrug (Nizhneudinsk raion).

On June 30, 1926, with the annexation of the Irkutsk governorate, divided into the Irkutsk, Tulun and Kiren okrugs, the krai's okrug registration was completed.

The territory of the krai consisted of the modern Altai and Krasnoyarsk krais; Omsk, Novosibirsk, Tomsk, Kemerovo, Irkutsk and partially the Tyumen oblasts, the Republic of Khakassia and the Altai Republic.

In 1926–1929, the division of raions and village councils was carried out.

In June 1929, the Tara okrug was annexed to the Omsk okrug, except for the Muromtsevsky District, which went to the Barabinsky District. The Yelansky District was transferred to the Barabinsky District.

By 1930, the Siberian krai had a territory of 4,064.4 thousand km^{2}, 18 okrugs, 233 raions, 5,520 village councils and 32,422 settlements; the population of the krai was 9,923.8 thousand people (including 1,472.9 thousand urban and 8,450.9 thousand rural).

The creation of the krai was of great importance for the economic and cultural development of the indigenous peoples and national minorities. The Khakass Okrug, the Gorno-Shorsky raion in the Kuznetsk okrug, Nemetsky raion in the Slavgorod Okrug, Turukhansky krai in the Krasnoyarsk okrug and a number of national village councils were formed in the region. The Siberian Regional Executive Committee adopted and implemented a special program to support national-territorial entities.

On July 23, 1930, the Central Executive Committee and the Council of People's Commissars of the USSR adopted a resolution on the liquidation of the okrugs, which determined changes in the administrative structure of Siberia. By the resolution of the All-Russian Central Executive Committee on July 30, 1930, the East-Siberian was separated from the Siberian krai, and the remaining territory was renamed the West-Siberian krai. The territory of the Irkutsk, Kansk and Kirensk okrugs, the Uyar and Partizansky raions of the Krasnoyarsk okrug and the territories of the Chita and Sretensk okrugs of the Far-Eastern krai were included in the composition of the East-Siberian krai.

== Administrative division ==
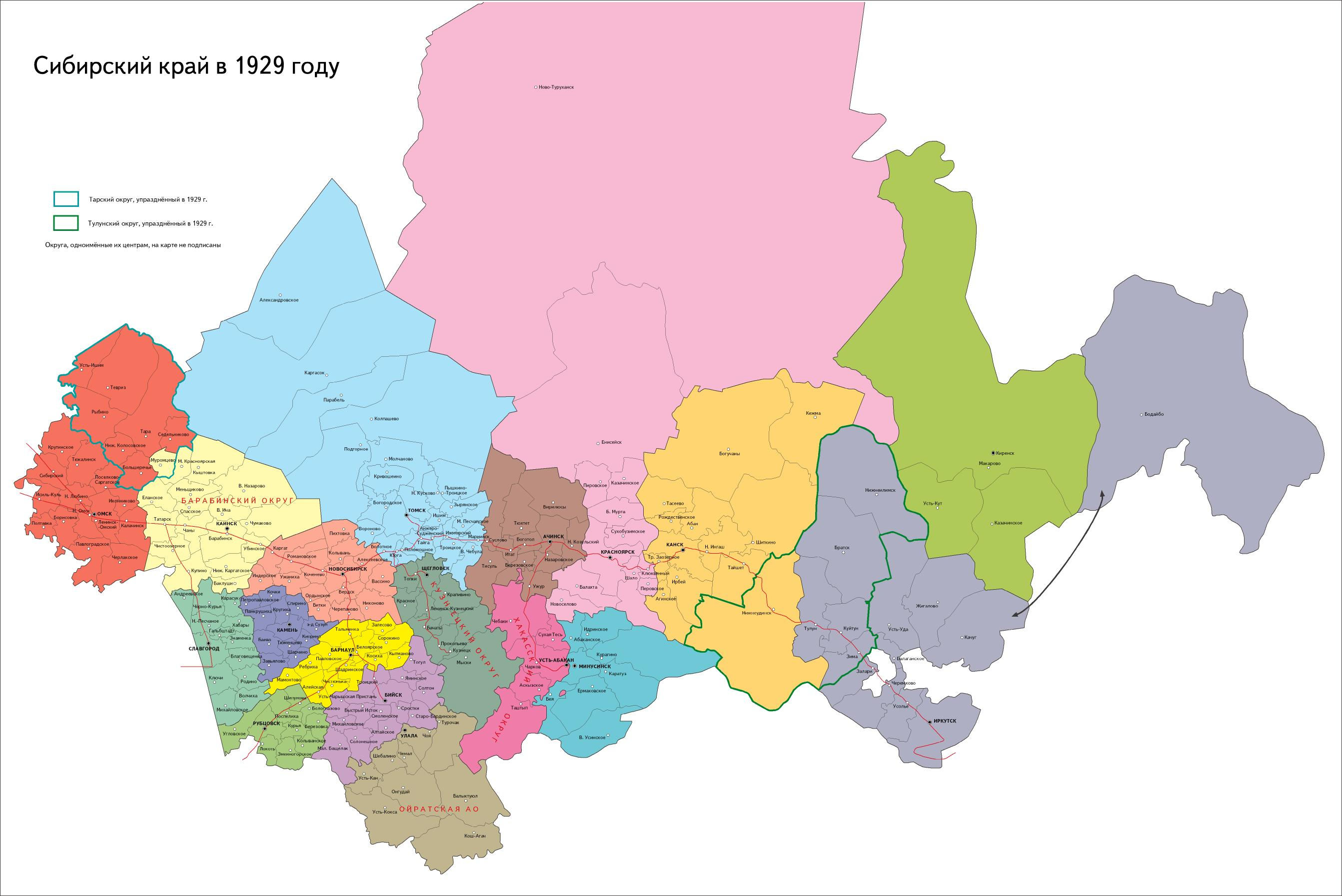
Map of the okrugs and raions of the Siberian krai (without the Northern regions)

1. Achin okrug (1925–1930)
2. Barabinsk okrug (1925–1930)
3. Barnaul okrug (1925–1930)
4. Biysk okrug (1925–1930)
5. Irkutsk okrug (1926–1930)
6. Kamen okrug (1925–1930)
7. Kansk okrug (1925–1930)
8. Kirensk okrug (1926–1930)
9. Krasnoyarsk okrug (1925–1930)
10. Kuznetsk okrug (1925–1930)
11. Minusinsk okrug (1925–1930)
12. Novosibirsk okrug (1925–1930)
13. Omsk okrug (1925–1930)
14. Rubtsovsk okrug (1925–1930)
15. Slavgorod okrug (1925–1930)
16. Tara okrug (1925–1929)
17. Tomsk okrug (1925–1930)
18. Tulun okrug (1926–1929)
19. Khakass okrug (1925–1930)
20. Oyrot autonomous oblast
21. Turukhansk krai

== Regional leadership ==
Chairmen of the Executive Committee

- Robert Eikhe (1925–1929)
- Stepan Matveevich Kuznetsov (1929–1930)
- Ivan Klimenko (1930)
