= Novonikolayevsk Governorate =

Province of Soviet Russia, 1921–1925

Novonikolayevsk Governorate (Russian: Ново-Николаевская губерния) is an administrative-territorial unit of the RSFSR, which existed in 1921–1925. The center is the city of Novo-Nikolaevsk (Novonikolaevsk).

== History ==
The governorate was formed on June 13, 1921 mainly from Kainsky and Novo-Nikolayevsky districts, previously part of the Tomsk province, and included some part of the territory of the Altai and Omsk provinces. The structure of the counties and volosts in the new province was reorganized — new counties and volosts were created. In particular, in June 1921, the Kargatsky Uyezd was created on the basis of the reorganized (enlarged) Kargatskaya Volost.

As of August 1921, the Novo-Nikolaevskaya province consists of 5 counties:

- Kainsky Uyezd
- Kamensky Uyezd
- Kargatsky Uyezd
- Novo-Nikolaevsky Uyezd
- Cherepanovsky Uyezd

In 1924–1925, the counties were divided into districts (from 6 to 13 districts per county).

Since May 25, 1925, in accordance with the resolution of the Presidium of the All-Russian Central Executive Committee of the RSFSR, all provinces, districts and volosts in Siberia were liquidated. In place of the former districts and volosts, in accordance with the jurisdiction of the "district committees of the RCP(b)" that appeared in 1920–1923, "districts" appear, where district committees form bodies of territorial administration and power: district executive committee, district police department, district military registration and enlistment office, district prosecutor's office, district court and district newspaper. Instead of provinces, territories and regions are formed.

The territory of Novo-Nikolaevskaya Governorate became part of the new Siberian Krai, and the city of Novo-Nikolaevsk (Novo-Nikolaevsk), renamed in 1926 to Novosibirsk, becomes the capital of the region.
