= 1939 in the Soviet Union =

- Decades: 1920s; 1930s; 1940s; 1950s
- See also: History of the Soviet Union; List of years in the Soviet Union

The following lists events that happened during 1939 in the Union of Soviet Socialist Republics.

== Incumbents ==
- General Secretary of the Communist Party of the Soviet Union – Joseph Stalin
- Chairman of the Presidium of the Supreme Soviet of the Soviet Union – Mikhail Kalinin
- Chairman of the Council of People's Commissars of the Soviet Union – Vyacheslav Molotov

== Events ==
- March 10–21 — 18th Congress of the All-Union Communist Party (Bolsheviks)
- May 11 — September 16 – Battles of Khalkhin Gol
- August 19 — German–Soviet Credit Agreement (1939)
- August 23 — Molotov–Ribbentrop Pact
- September 17-October 6 — Soviet invasion of Poland
- September 28 — Soviet–Estonian Mutual Assistance Treaty, also amendment to the German–Soviet Frontier Treaty
- October 5 — Soviet–Latvian Mutual Assistance Treaty
- October 10 — Soviet–Lithuanian Mutual Assistance Treaty
- November 26 — Shelling of Mainila
- November 30 — Winter War

== Births ==
=== January ===
- January 4 — Igor Chislenko, Russian footballer (d. 1994)
- January 6 — Valeriy Lobanovskyi, Soviet and Ukrainian football player and manager (d. 2002)
- January 22 — Mikhail Moiseyev, military officer and politician (d. 2022)
- January 28 — Viktor Shustikov, Russian footballer (d. 2025)
- January 31 — Aleksandr Porokhovshchikov, Russian actor and film director (d. 2012)

=== February ===
- February 1 — Ekaterina Maximova, Soviet and Russian ballerina (d. 2009)
- February 2 — Valeri Kravchenko, volleyball player (d. 1996)
- February 6 — Simon Achikgyozyan, Armenian military commander (d. 1991)
- February 15 — Akbar Mirzoyev, 2nd Prime Minister of Tajikistan
- February 16 — Nikolai Sevryugin, 1st Governor of Tula Oblast (d. 2002)
- February 23 — Anatoly Dobryakov, 1st Governor of Pskov Oblast (d. 2003)
- February 28 — Valentina Khmel, Russian painter-plasterer and politician

=== March ===
- March 8 — Lidiya Skoblikova, Soviet and Russian speed skater and coach
- March 31 — Zviad Gamsakhurdia, 1st President of Georgia (d. 1993)

=== April ===
- April 15 — Omirbek Baigeldi, 1st Chairman of the Senate of Kazakhstan (d. 2024)

=== May ===
- May 2 — Leonid Kanevsky, actor
- May 19 — Kateryna Boloshkevich, Ukrainian weaver and statesperson (d. 2018)
- May 20 — Roman Kartsev, Soviet and Russian actor (d. 2018)
- May 26
  - Merab Kostava, Georgian dissident, musician and poet (d. 1989)
  - Vitaly Galkov, sprint canoer (d. 1998)
- May 30 — Mikhail Kolesnikov, 2nd Chief of the General Staff of the Russian Armed Forces (d. 2007)

=== June ===
- June 20 — Leonid Gorbenko, 2nd Governor of Kaliningrad Oblast (d. 2010)

=== July ===
- July 5 — Pavel Morozenko, theatre and film actor (d. 1991)
- July 7
  - Elena Obraztsova, Soviet and Russian opera singer (d. 2015)
  - Vladilen Volkov, 2nd Head of the Altai Republic
- July 16 — Konstantin Kobets, State Adviser for the RSFSR for Defence (d. 2012)

=== August ===
- August 4 — Oleg Zaytsev, ice hockey defenceman (d. 1993)
- August 5 — Jumber Patiashvili, 14th First Secretary of the Georgian Communist Party
- August 14 — Vladislav Tikhomirov, 2nd Governor of Ivanovo Oblast (d. 2017)
- August 16 — Valery Ryumin, Soviet cosmonaut (d. 2022)
- August 17 — Valery Gavrilin, Soviet and Russian composer (d. 1999)
- August 28 — Vladimir Ivashov, Soviet and Russian actor (d. 1995)

=== September ===
- September 5 — Suren Arutyunyan, 14th First Secretary of the Communist Party of Armenia (d. 2019)
- September 7 — Stanislav Petrov, Soviet Air Defence Forces official (d. 2017)
- September 12 — Ion Ustian, 5th Chairman of the Council of Ministers of the Moldavian SSR
- September 13 — Guntis Ulmanis, 5th President of Latvia
- September 17 — Vladimir Menshov, actor and film director (d. 2021)

=== October ===
- October 2 — Yuri Glazkov, Soviet Air Force officer and cosmonaut (d. 2008)
- October 5 — Vladimir Rusalov, Russian psychologist and anthropologist (d. 2023)
- October 8 — Elvīra Ozolina, javelin thrower
- October 12 — Yuri Vasilyev, Soviet and Russian stage and film actor (d. 1999)
- October 18 — Ivan Shabanov, 4th Governor of Voronezh Oblast

=== November ===
- November 9 — Suimenkul Chokmorov, Kyrgyz film actor (d. 1992)
- November 11 — Claudia Boyarskikh, Russian cross-country skier, Olympic champion (1964) (d. 2009)
- November 21 — Vladimir Suslov, 1st Governor of Tver Oblast
- November 22 — Mikhail Poltoranin, Russian politician and journalist (d. 2026)
- November 28 — Gennadi Volnov, Russian basketball player (d. 2008)

=== December ===
- December 6 — Abish Kekilbayev, 2nd State Counsellor of Kazakhstan (d. 2015)
- December 22 — Valentin Afonin, Soviet and Russian footballer (d. 2021)
- December 30 — Elena Tchaikovskaia, Russian figure skating coach and choreographer

== Deaths ==
- January 15 — Kullervo Manner, politician (b. 1880)
- February 2 — Vladimir Shukhov, engineer (b. 1853)
- February 22 — Grigory Khakhanyan, corps commander (b. 1896)
- February 23
  - Pyotr Smirnov, naval officer and politician (b. 1897)
  - Alexander Yegorov, army officer (b. 1883)
- February 26
  - Stanislav Kosior, politician (b. 1889)
  - Vlas Chubar, politician (b. 1891)
  - Pavel Postyshev, politician (b. 1887)
  - Ivan Fedko, army officer (b. 1897)
  - Levon Mirzoyan, politician (b. 1897)
- February 27 — Nadezhda Krupskaya, revolutionary and wife of Vladimir Lenin (b. 1869)
- March 3 — Georgy Bazilevich, corps commander (b. 1889)
- March 7 — Matvei Berman, security officer (b. 1898)
- March 10 — Georgy Bondar, corps commander (b. 1893)
- April 1 — Anton Makarenko, educator and writer (b. 1888)
- April 15 — Konstantin Petrovich Grigorovich, engineer and professor (b. 1886)
- May 11
  - Polina Osipenko, military pilot (b. 1907)
  - Anatoly Serov, fighter pilot (b. 1910)
- May 19 — Karl Radek, politician (b. 1885)
- May 21 — Grigori Sokolnikov, economist and politician (b. 1888)
- July 29 — Vilhelm Knorin, politician (b. 1890)
- September 11 — Konstantin Korovin, painter (b. 1861)
- October 7 — Boris Shchukin, actor (b. 1894)
- December 25 — Ivan Dmitriyevich Borisov, military pilot (b. 1913)

== See also ==
- 1939 in fine arts of the Soviet Union
- List of Soviet films of 1939
