= 1891 in Russia =

- Decades: 1870s; 1880s; 1890s; 1900s; 1910s
- See also: History of Russia; Timeline of Russian history; List of years in Russia

Events from the year 1891 in Russia.

== Incumbents ==
- Monarch – Alexander III

== Events ==
- Construction of the Trans-Siberian Railroad Begins
- Eastern journey of Nicholas II
- Ōtsu incident
- Russian famine of 1891–92

== Births ==
- January 1 – Boris Morros, an American Communist Party member, Soviet agent, and FBI double agent (d. 1963)
- January 3 – Osip Mandelstam, poet (d. 1938)
- January 8 – Bronislava Nijinska, ballet dancer (d. 1972)
- January 20 – Mischa Elman, violinist (d. 1967)
- January 21 – Nikolai Golovanov, conductor and composer (d. 1953)
- January 23 – Abram Besicovitch, mathematician (d. 1970)
- February 14 – Liubov Kemularia-Nathadze, botanist (d. 1985)
- February 18 – Artur Artuzov, security officer and spymaster of the Soviet Union (d. 1937)
- February 23 – Vladimir Karelin, revolutionary, one of the organizers of the Left Socialist Revolutionary Party (d. 1938)
- March 9 – Arkadi Maslow, politician (d. 1941)
- March 17 – Matvey Manizer, a sculptor (d. 1966)
- March 24 – Sergey Vavilov, physicist, the President of the Academy of Sciences of the Soviet Union, brother of Nikolai Vavilov (d. 1951)
- April 4 – Lidija Liepiņa, a physical chemist, professor (d. 1985)
- April 23 – Sergei Prokofiev, composer (d. 1953)
- May 19 – Hamo Beknazarian, film director, actor and screenwriter (d. 1965)
- May 26 – Vladimir Lebedev, a painter, a political cartoonist and a poster artist (d. 1967)
- May 27 – Jaan Kärner, a poet and writer (d. 1958)
- May 15 – Mikhail Bulgakov, writer, medical doctor, and playwright (d. 1940)
- May 15 – Vladimir Korvin-Piotrovskii, poet and writer, playwright (d. 1966)
- June 25 – Pavel Lazimir, a Russian revolutionary and Soviet military leader (d. 1920)
- July 1 – Aron Baron, anarchist revolutionary (d. 1937)
- July 16 – Boris Lavrenyov, a writer and playwright (d. 1959)
- July 29 – Mikhail Zavadovsky, biologist (d. 1940)
- August 2 – Viktor Zhirmunsky, literary historian and linguist (d. 1971)
- August 17 – Aleksandr Kasyanov, composer, conductor, pianist and professor (d. 1982)
- September 3 – Evgeny Messner, professional soldier and military theorist (d. 1974)
- September 11 – Alexander Bazhbeuk-Melikyan, artist, graphic designer and sculptor (d. 1966)
- September 30 – Mikhail Medvedev-Kudrin, a Russian revolutionary, Chekist, direct participant in the execution of the Romanov family (d. 1964)
- September 30 – Ivan Mezhlauk, politician and statesman (d. 1938)
- October 5 – Mykola Liubynsky, a politician and diplomat (d. 1938)
- October 19 – Asja Lācis, an actress and theatre director (d. 1979)
- October 22 – Hans Kruus, historian, academic and politician (d. 1976)
- October 26 – Alexander Beloborodov, Bolshevik revolutionary, Soviet politician, party figure and statesman (d. 1938)
- November 9 – Rodion Kuzmin, mathematician, known for his works in number theory and analysis (d. 1949)
- November 11 – Lilya Brik, author and socialite, the lover and muse of Vladimir Mayakovsky (d. 1978)
- November 12 – Władysław Bortnowski, historian and military commander (d. 1966)
- November 20 – Izrail Agol, geneticist and philosopher (d. 1937)
- November 29 – Ivan Mikhailov, politician, economist, and White émigré (d. 1946)
- December 9 – Maksim Bahdanovič, poet, journalist, translator, literary critic and historian of literature (d. 1917)
- December 14 – Nikolay Belov, crystallographer and geochemist (d. 1982)
- December 20 – Maria Skobtsova, a Russian noblewoman, poet, nun, and member of the French Resistance during World War II (d. 1945)
- December 25 – Leonid Kubbel, composer of chess endgame studies and problems (d. 1942)
- December 30 – Nina Koshetz, operatic lyric soprano, recital singer, and the niece of Alexander Koshetz (d. 1965)
- December 31 – Mikhail Alafuso, general (d. 1937)

== Deaths ==
- January 11 – Samuel Joseph Fuenn, writer, scholar, printer, and editor (b. 1818)
- February 16 – Karl Maximovich, botanist (b. 1827)
- February 17 – Nikolay Kridener, infantry general (b. 1811)
- March 24 – Mikhail Mirkovich, regimental commander and ethnographer, the son of Fedor Mirkovich (b. 1836)
- April 9 – Antonina Bludova, philanthropist, salonist, memoirist and lady-in-waiting (b. 1813)
- April 10 – Pyotr Petrov, writer, arts historian and critic, genealogist and bibliographer (b. 1827)
- April 12 – Grand Duchess Olga Feodorovna of Russia, the daughter of Grand Duke Leopold of Baden and Sophie Wilhelmine of Sweden (b. 1839)
- April 24 – Nikolai Shelgunov, a forestry professor, journalist, and literary critic (b. 1824)
- April 25 – Grand Duke Nicholas Nikolaevich, son of Tsar Nicholas I of Russia and Alexandra Feodorovna (b. 1831)
- May 8 – Alexander von Keyserling, Baltic German geologist and paleontologist from the Keyserlingk family of Baltic German nobility (b. 1815)
- May 20 – Olga Ulyanova, a Russian noblewoman, polyglot, and the sister of Vladimir Lenin (b. 1871)
- June 5 – David Chubinashvili, a Georgian lexicographer, linguist, and scholar of old Georgian literature (b. 1814)
- June 20 – Andreas Roller, landscape painter and theatrical set designer (b. 1805)
- July 12 – Serhiy Podolynsky, a Ukrainian socialist, physician, and an early pioneer of ecological economics (b. 1850)
- August 16 – Ivan Naumovich, a priest, member of parliament, writer, and a major figure in the Russophile movement in western Ukraine (b. 1826)
- September 4 – Mikhail Koyalovich, historian, political journalist and publisher (b. 1828)
- September 24 – Princess Alexandra of Greece and Denmark, the wife of Grand Duke Paul Alexandrovich of Russia (b. 1870)
- September 27 – Ivan Goncharov, novelist (b. 1812)
- September 27 – Vladimir Titov, writer, statesman, diplomat (b. 1807)
- October 26 – Liodor Palmin, poet, translator and journalist (b. 1841)
- November 17 – Eduard Brandt, anatomist and zoologist (b. 1839)
- November 18 – Dmitrii Zhuravskii, mechanical scientist and engineer (b. 1821)
- November 24 – Konstantin Leontiev, philosopher (b. 1831)
- November 26 – Faraj bey Aghayev, lieutenant general of The Imperial Russian Army (b. 1814)
- December 6 – Pyotr Smyslov, astronomer and geodesist (b. 1827)
- December 11 – Alexander Potebnja, linguist, philosopher and panslavist (b. 1835)
- December 21 – Leon Pinsker, a physician and Zionist activist (b. 1821)
