= Berlin Poets' Club =

Group of Russian poets in Berlin (1928–1933)

The Berlin Poets' Club (Russian: Берлинский кружок поэтов (1928–1933) was a group of Russian émigré poets. Members included:

- Mikhail Gorlin (leader of the club)
- Raisa Blokh (wife of M. Gorlin)
- Vladimir Korvin-Piotrovskii
- Nina Korvin-Piotrovskaia
- Vladimir Sirin (Nabokov)
- Véra Nabokov
- Yuri Ofrosimov
- Sofiya Pregel
- Boris Vilde
- Yuri Dzhanumov
- Nikolai Belotsvetov
- Yevgueni Rabinovich, and some others.

The club had to stop its activities in 1933 when the Nazis came to power, as many of its members were Jewish. Most of them moved to Paris, where later some of them were killed during the Holocaust.

== Literature ==
- Amory Burchard: Klubs der russischen Dichter in Berlin 1920-1941. Institutionen des literarischen Lebens im Exil. Ed. Otto Sagner, Munich 2001, p. 239-283 ISBN 3-87690-759-4
- Yevgenia Kannak, Berlinski kruzhok poetov (1928-1933). In: Russki almanakh. Ed. R. Guerra, S. Shakhovskaya, E. Ternovski. Paris 1981, p. 363–366.
- Eugenie Salkind: Die junge russische Literatur in der Emigration. In: Osteuropa 10. 1931. p. 575–590, retrieved 10 June 2020
- Thomas Urban: Russkiye pisateli v Berline v 20-е gody XX vekа. Saint Petersburg 2014, p. 263-282 ISBN 978-5-87417-494-1

== Sources ==
Some notes and correspondence from the Club are located in the Vladimir Korvin-Piotrovskii Papers at the Beinecke Library, Yale University.
