= Aleksandr Kasyanov =

Aleksandr Kasyanov may refer to:

- Alexander Kasjanov (born 1983), Russian bobsledder
- Aleksandr Kasyanov (composer) (1891–1982), Soviet and Russian composer, conductor, pianist and professor
