= 1939 in fine arts of the Soviet Union =

The year 1939 was marked by many events that left an imprint on the history of Soviet and Russian fine arts.

== Events ==
- January 30 — The Sixth Exhibition of the Moscow Union of Artists was opened in the Central Exhibition Hall. Exhibited 780 works of 299 artists. The participants were Vasily Baksheev, Sergey Gerasimov, Mikhail Kuprijanov, Mikhail Matorin, Dmitriy Nalbandyan, Piotr Petrovichev, Arcady Plastov, Piotr Pokarzhevsky, Fyodor Reshetnikov, David Shterenberg, Leonard Turzhansky, and other important Soviet artists.
- March 12 — All-Union Art Exhibition dedicated to 20th Anniversary of Komsomol was opened in Tretyakov gallery in Moscow. Exhibited 903 works of 478 artists. The participants were Piotr Belousov, Aleksandr Deyneka, Piotr Vasiliev, Nina Veselova, Alexei Eremin, Vecheslav Zagonek, Alexander Lubimov, Yuri Neprintsev, Martiros Saryan, and other important Soviet artists.
- March 18 — All-Union Art Exhibition named «Industry of Socialism» was opened in Moscow. Exhibited 1015 works of 459 artists. The participants were Mikhail Avilov, Samuil Adlivankin, Sergey Gerasimov, Aleksandr Gerasimov, Igor Grabar, Boris Ioganson, Aleksandr Laktionov, Alexander Lubimov, Mikhail Platunov, Arcady Rylov, Arcady Plastov, Piotr Pokarzhevsky, Fyodor Reshetnikov, Vladimir Serov, David Shterenberg, and other important Soviet artists.

== Births ==
- February 5 — Irina Getmanskaya (Russian: Гетманская Ирина Ивановна), Soviet Russian painter.
- September 14 — Nina Suzdaleva (Russian: Суздалева Нина Владимировна), Russian Soviet painter (d. 1988; see 1988 in fine arts of the Soviet Union).

== Deaths ==
- January 19 — Vladimir Shchuko (Russian: Щуко Владимир Алексеевич), Russian architect (b. 1878).
- February 7 — Boris Grigoriev (Russian: Григорьев Борис Дмитриевич), Russian painter and graphic artist (b. 1886).
- February 15 — Kuzma Petrov-Vodkin (Russian: Петров-Водкин Кузьма Сергеевич), Russian painter and art educator (b. 1878).
- May 6 — Konstantin Somov (Russian: Сомов Константин Андреевич), Russian painter and graphic artist (b. 1869).
- June 22 — Arcady Rylov (Russian: Рылов Аркадий Александрович), Russian painter and art educator (b. 1870).
- August 14 — Isaak Brodsky (Russian: Бродский Исаак Израилевич), Russian painter and art educator (b. 1883).
- September 11 — Konstantin Korovin, (Russian: Коровин Константин Алексеевич), Russian painter and theater artist (b. 1861).
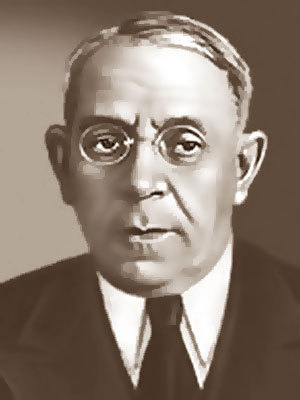
Vladimir Shchuko

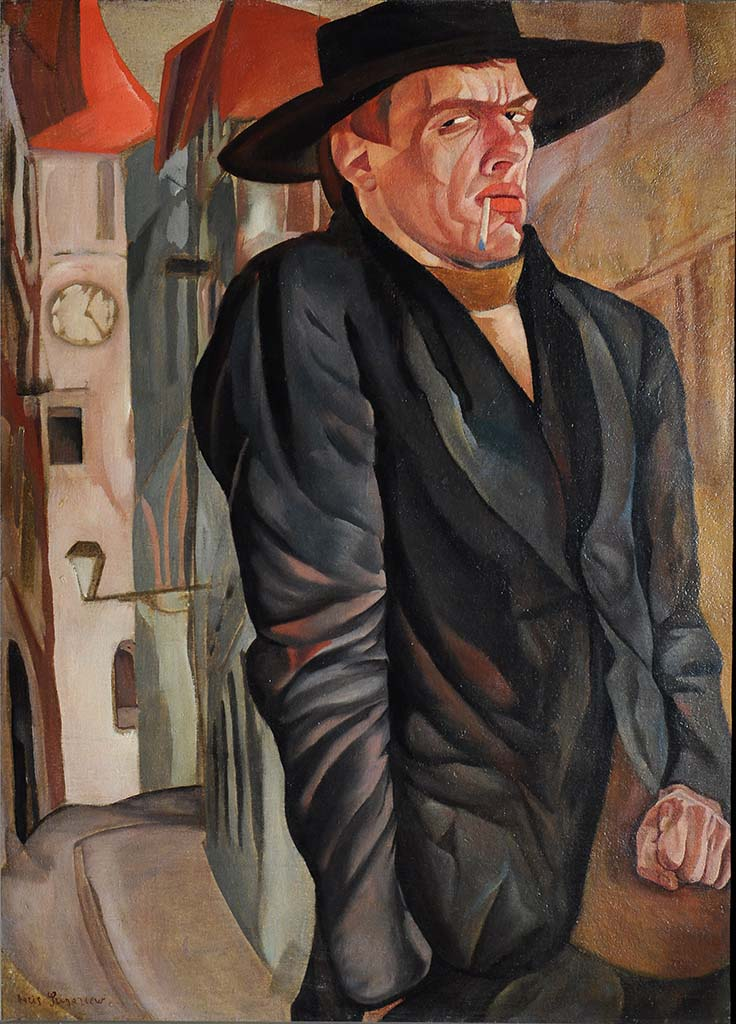
Boris Grigoriev

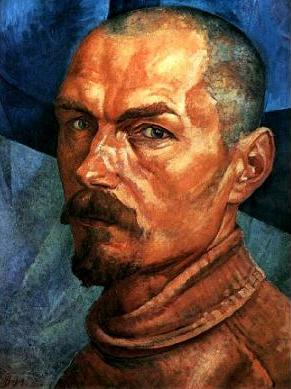
Kuzma Petrov-Vodkin

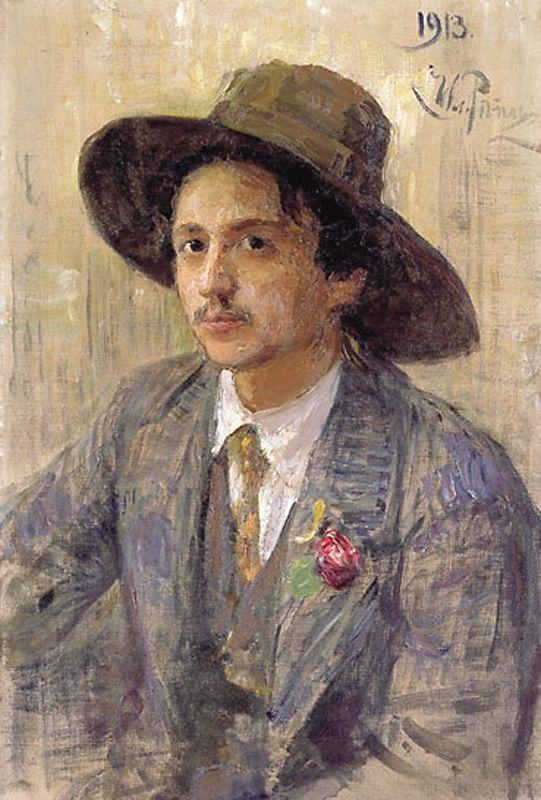
Isaak Brodsky

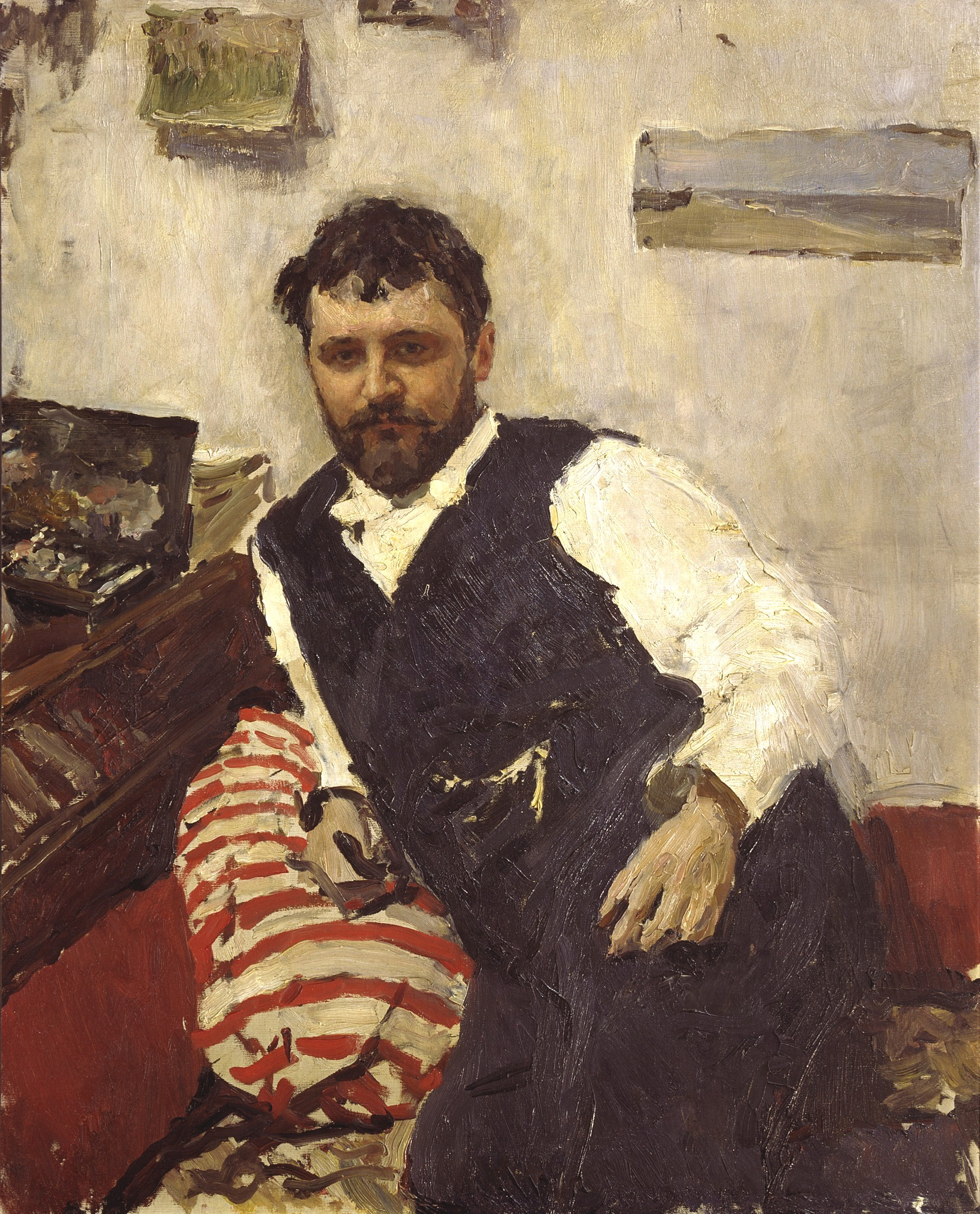
Konstantin Korovin

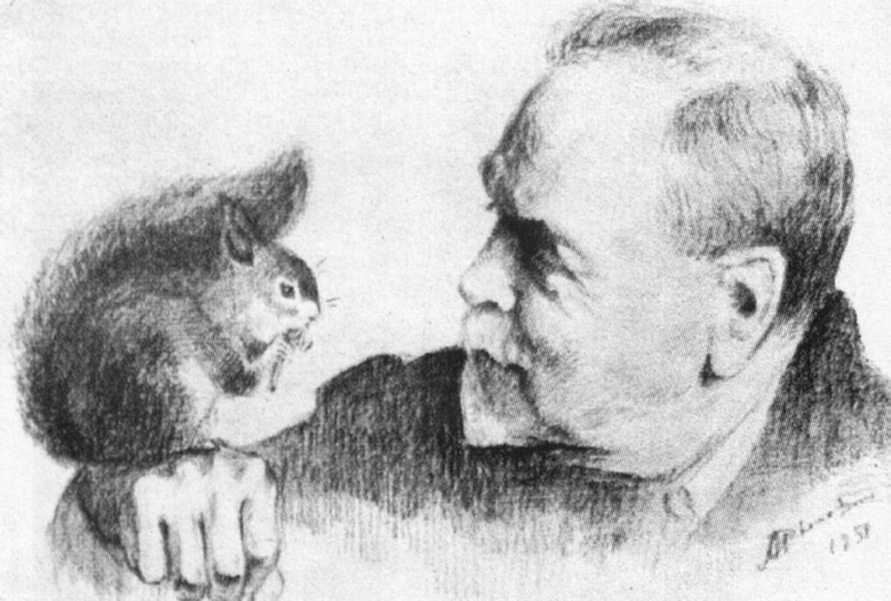
Arcady Rylov

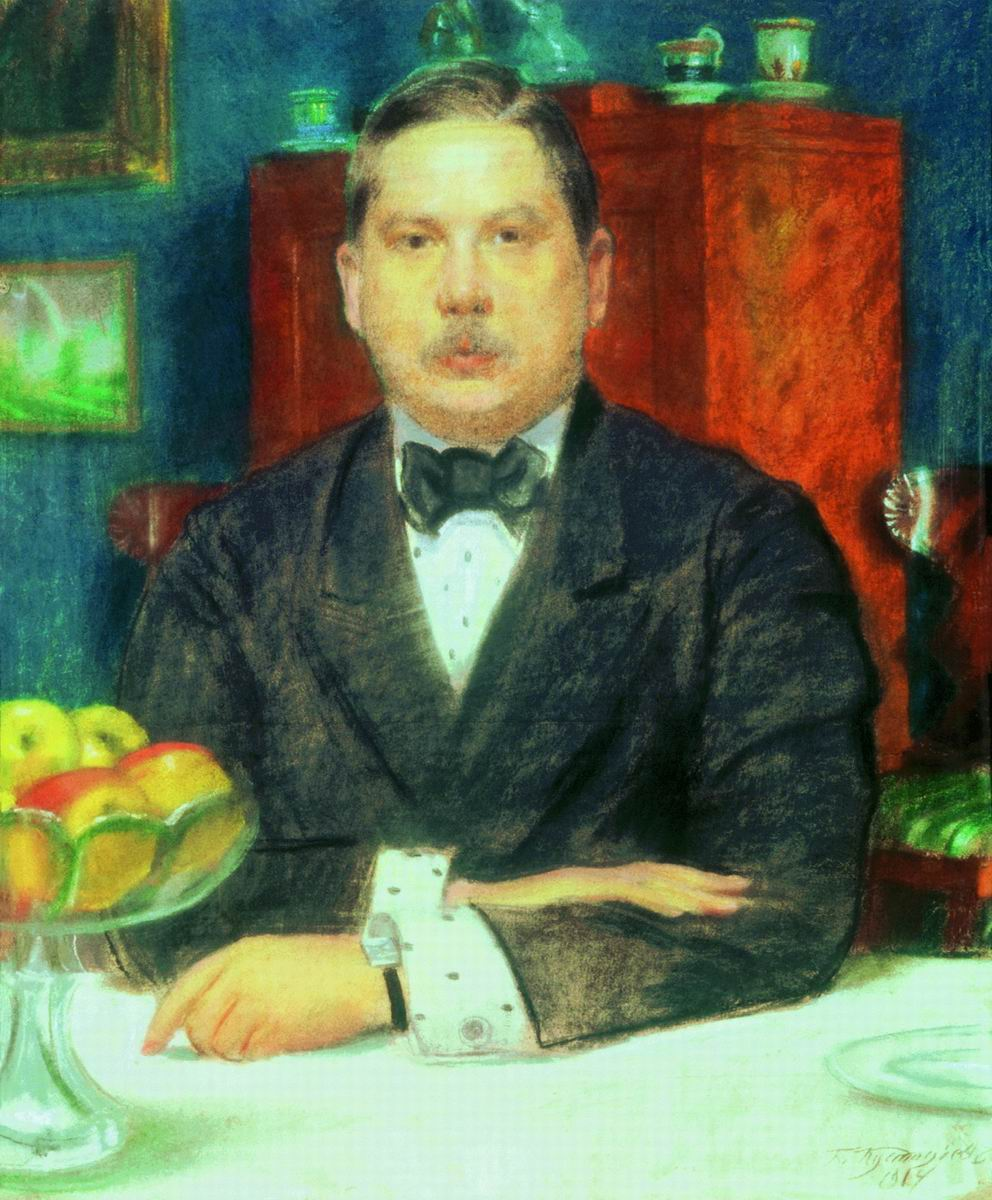
Konstantin Somov

== See also ==
- List of Russian artists
- List of painters of Leningrad Union of Artists
- Saint Petersburg Union of Artists
- Russian culture
- 1939 in the Soviet Union

== Sources ==
- Всесоюзная выставка молодых художников. Каталог выставки. М., ГТГ, 1939.
- Выставка произведений ленинградских художников. Л., Искусство, 1939.
- Каталог шестой выставки Союза московских художников (МОСХ). М-Л., Искусство, 1939.
- Сталин и люди Советской страны в изобразительном искусстве. Каталог выставки. М., Государственная Третьяковская галерея, 1939.
- Выставка дипломных работ художественных вузов 1939 г. М-Л.,Искусство, 1939.
- Каталог выставки живописи и графики. М., МОССХ, 1939.
- Всесоюзная художественная выставка «Индустрия социализма». Каталог выставки. М—Л., Искусство, 1939.
- Юбилейная историческая выставка. 1764—1939. Л., ВАХ, 1940.
- Artists of Peoples of the USSR. Biobibliography Dictionary. Vol. 1. Moscow, Iskusstvo, 1970.
- Artists of Peoples of the USSR. Biobibliography Dictionary. Vol. 2. Moscow, Iskusstvo, 1972.
- Directory of Members of Union of Artists of USSR. Volume 1,2. Moscow, Soviet Artist Edition, 1979.
- Directory of Members of the Leningrad branch of the Union of Artists of Russian Federation. Leningrad, Khudozhnik RSFSR, 1980.
- Artists of Peoples of the USSR. Biobibliography Dictionary. Vol. 4 Book 1. Moscow, Iskusstvo, 1983.
- Directory of Members of the Leningrad branch of the Union of Artists of Russian Federation. Leningrad, Khudozhnik RSFSR, 1987.
- Персональные и групповые выставки советских художников. 1917-1947 гг. М., Советский художник, 1989.
- Artists of peoples of the USSR. Biobibliography Dictionary. Vol. 4 Book 2. Saint Petersburg: Academic project humanitarian agency, 1995.
- Link of Times: 1932 – 1997. Artists – Members of Saint Petersburg Union of Artists of Russia. Exhibition catalogue. Saint Petersburg, Manezh Central Exhibition Hall, 1997.
- Matthew C. Bown. Dictionary of 20th Century Russian and Soviet Painters 1900-1980s. London, Izomar, 1998.
- Vern G. Swanson. Soviet Impressionism. – Woodbridge, England: Antique Collectors' Club, 2001.
- Время перемен. Искусство 1960—1985 в Советском Союзе. СПб., Государственный Русский музей, 2006.
- Sergei V. Ivanov. Unknown Socialist Realism. The Leningrad School. Saint-Petersburg, NP-Print Edition, 2007. ISBN 5901724216, ISBN 9785901724217.
- Anniversary Directory graduates of Saint Petersburg State Academic Institute of Painting, Sculpture, and Architecture named after Ilya Repin, Russian Academy of Arts. 1915 – 2005. Saint Petersburg, Pervotsvet Publishing House, 2007.

== See also ==
- 1878 in art
