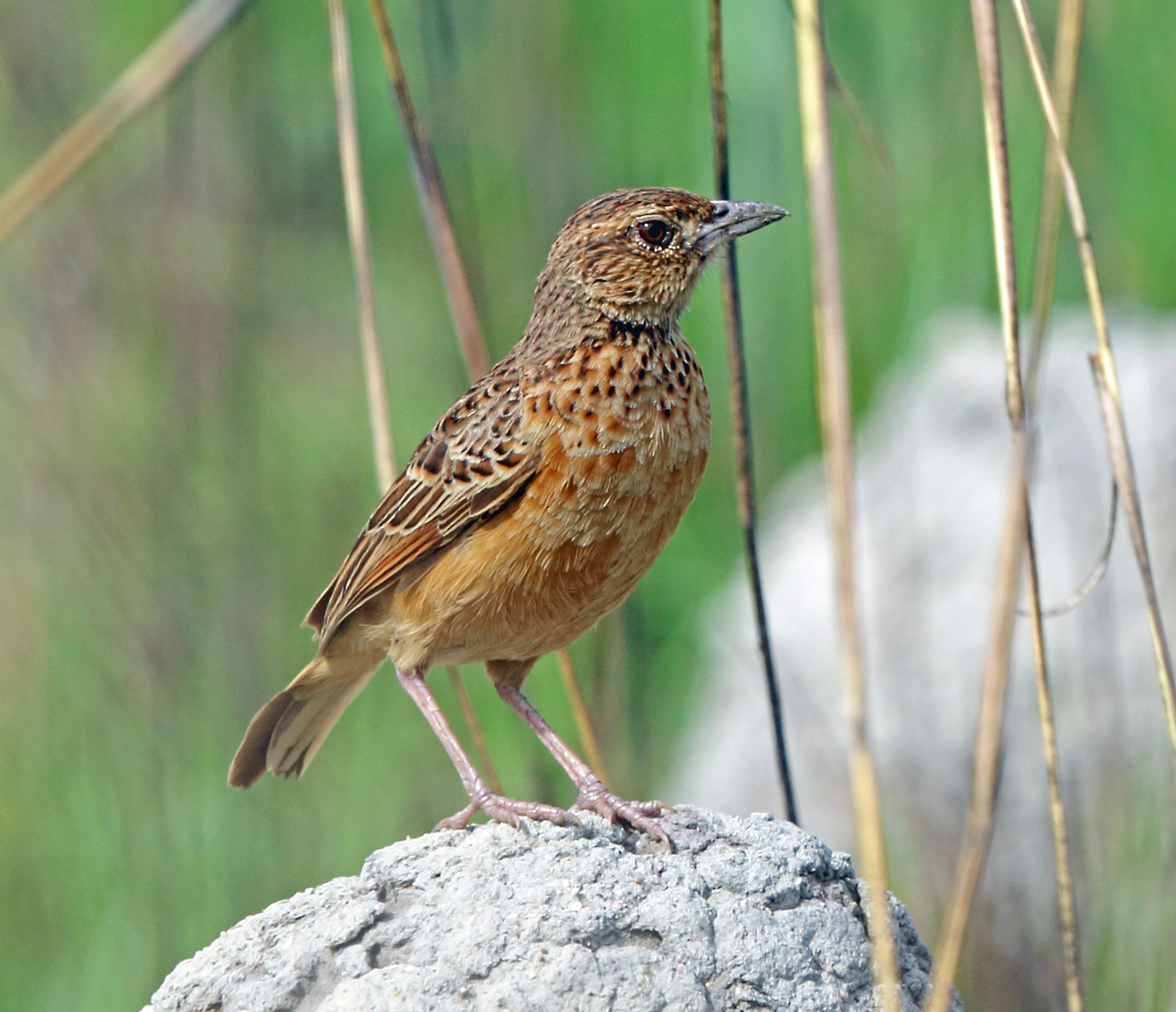
- Flappet lark (Amirafra rufocinnamomea fischeri)

Scientific classification
- Kingdom: Animalia
- Phylum: Chordata
- Class: Aves
- Order: Passeriformes
- Family: Alaudidae
- Genus: Amirafra; Bianchi, 1906

Type species
- Miafra collaris collared lark Sharpe, 1896

= Amirafra =

Genus of birds

Amirafra is a genus of larks in the family Alaudidae. It contains three species that were formerly placed in the genus Mirafra. These larks are found in sub-Sahara Africa.

== Taxonomy ==
A 2023 molecular phylogenetic study of the lark family Alaudidae by the Swedish ornithologist Per Alström and his collaborators found that the genus Mirafra contained deep internal genetic divergences. They therefore proposed splitting Mirafra into four genera, each corresponding to a major clade. For one of these clades they resurrected the genus Amirafra that had originally been introduced in 1906 by the Russian ornithologist Valentin Bianchi with Mirafra collaris Sharpe, 1896, the collared lark, as the type species. The name Amirafra combines the Ancient Greek negative prefix α-/a- with the genus Mirafra that had been introduced in 1821 by Thomas Horsfield.

The genus contains the following three species:

Image	Common name	Scientific name
	Collared lark	Amirafra collaris
	Angola lark	Amirafra angolensis
	Flappet lark	Amirafra rufocinnamomea
