= Cinnamon bush lark =

Cinnamon bush lark may refer to:

- Flappet lark, a species of lark found in Africa
- Horsfield's bush lark, a species of lark found in Australia and Southeast Asia
