= Kasyanov =

Kasyanov or Kasjanov (Russian: Касьянов) is a Russian masculine surname, its feminine counterpart is Kasyanova or Kasjanova. It may refer to:

- Alexander Kasjanov (born 1983), Russian bobsledder
- Alexander Kasyanov (1891–1982), Russian composer and conductor
- Artem Kasyanov (born 1983, Ukrainian football player
- Hanna Kasyanova (née Melnychenko in 1983), Ukrainian heptathlete
- Mikhail Kasyanov (born 1957), Russian statesman and politician
- Oleksiy Kasyanov (born 1985), Ukrainian decathlete
