= Vladimir Korvin-Piotrovskii =

Russian writer (1891–1966)

Vladimir L'vovich Korvin-Piotrovskii (Russian: Владимир Львович Корвин-Пиотровский; 15 May 1891 – 2 April 1966) was a Russian poet. His place of birth is sometimes identified as the Ukrainian town of Bila Tserkva, where Korvin-Piotrovskii spent much of his childhood. During World War I, Korvin-Piotrovskii served in the White Army as an artillery officer. After being taken prisoner and barely escaping execution, he crossed through Poland and made his way to Berlin around 1920.

In Berlin, Korvin-Piotrovskii became active in the Russian emigre literary community. There he met Yuri Ofrosimov and Vladimir Nabokov. He also became involved with the Berlin Poets' Club, a group of Russian emigre poets founded by Mikhail Gorlin. In addition to Ofrosimov, Korvin-Piotrovskii and Sirin, members included Raisa Blokh, Nina Korvin-Piotrovskaia (née Kaplun), Véra Nabokov, and Sofiya Pregel.

Vladimir and Nina Korvin-Piotrovskii left Germany before World War II began. Nina Korvin-Piotrovskaia worked at the French embassy in Berlin, and they were able to travel to Paris with embassy staff. During World War II, Korvin-Piotrovskii was active in the French Resistance movement. He was arrested and imprisoned for approximately eight months in 1944. His fellow prisoners included the French writer André Frossard, whose memoir La maison des otages documents this time period.

Vladimir and Nina Korvin-Piotrovskii were close friends with Italo and Leila Griselli and visited them many times in Italy. Italo Griselli, a sculptor, made busts of both Vladimir and Nina Korvin-Piotrovskii.

In 1961, the family moved to Los Angeles, California, where Vladimir Korvin-Piotrovskii died on 2 April 1966. Nina Korvin-Piotrovskaia died in 1975.

== Literary archives ==
Vladimir Korvin-Piotrovskii Papers. Beinecke Rare Book and Manuscript Library, Yale University.

== Bibliography ==
- Zvezdnoi tropoiu (1921)
- Polyn' i zvezdy (1923)
- Beatriche (1929)
- Vozdushnyi zmei (1950)
- Porazhenie (1960)
- Pozdnii gost (1968 - 1969)
