= David Frischmann =

Polish-Jewish writer

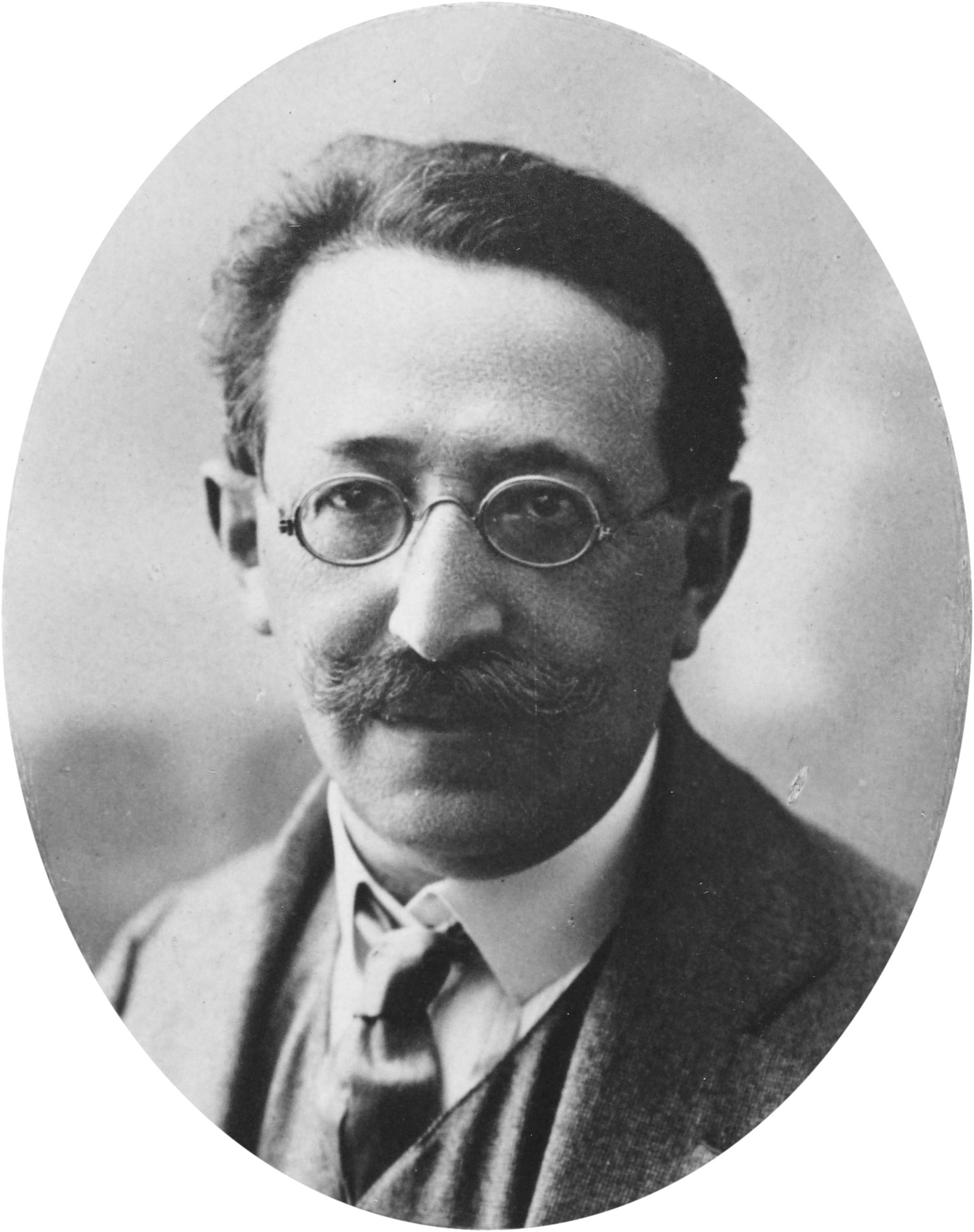
- Born: 31 December 1859; Zgierz, Congress Poland
- Died: 4 August 1922 (aged 62); Berlin, Germany
- Education: University of Breslau
- Writing career
- Language: Hebrew, Yiddish

David ben Saul Frischmann (Hebrew: דָּוִד בֵּן שָׁאוּל פְרִישְׁמַן, 31 December 1859 – 4 August 1922) was a Hebrew and Yiddish modernist writer, poet and translator. He edited several important Hebrew periodicals, and wrote fiction, poetry, essays, feuilletons, literary criticisms, and translations.

== Biography ==
David Frischmann was born in the town of Zgierz to Shaul and Freida Beila Frischmann. Frischmann's family moved to Łódź when he was two years old, where he received a private education combining Jewish and humanistic studies. Frischmann showed literary talent at a young age, and was considered a prodigy.

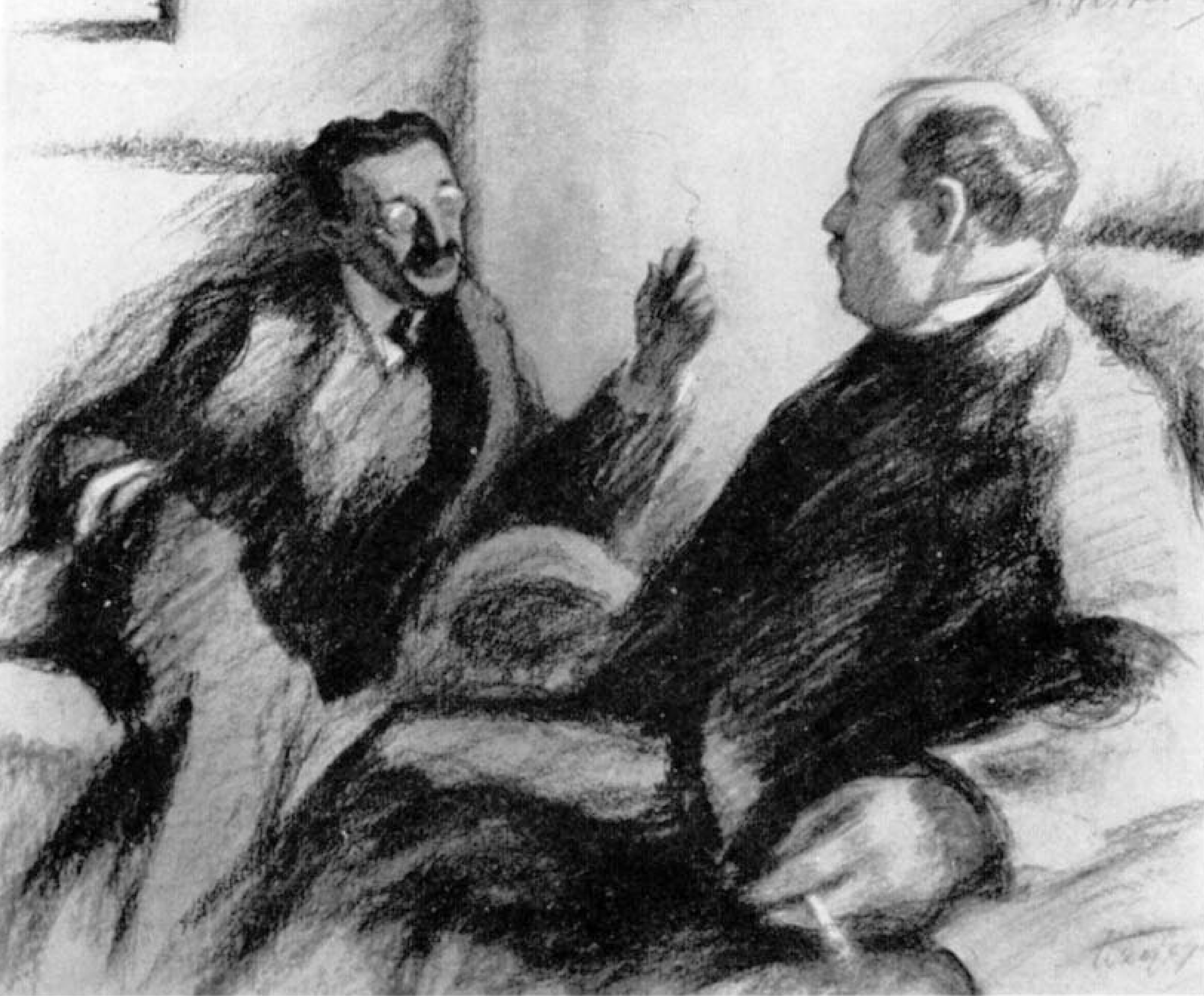
Painting of Frischmann (left) and Hayim Nahman Bialik by Leonid Pasternak

Between 1895 and 1910 Frischmann studied philology, philosophy and the history of art at the University of Breslau where he befriended Micha Josef Berdyczewski. Frischmann was imprisoned in Berlin as an enemy alien at the outbreak of the World War I. After a few months he was allowed to return to Poland; he returned to Warsaw and was deported to Odessa by the Russian authorities when the German troops approached in 1915. In Odessa he translated the works of the Brothers Grimm, Tagore, Goethe, Heine, Byron, Wilde, and France, and contributed poetry to the Yiddish magazine Undzer Lebn. He briefly moved to Moscow following the Russian Revolution of 1917, where he became chairman of the editorial board of the Stybel Publishing House. He returned to Warsaw after the Bolsheviks closed the publishing house down in 1919.

Frischmann went to Berlin in 1922 to be treated for a serious illness, and died there that year. Eulogies at his funeral were delivered by Hayim Nahman Bialik and David Bergelson. His last work was a translation of Shakespeare's Coriolanus into Hebrew, which appeared posthumously.

== Journalism and literary career ==
He published his first article, in Chaim Selig Slonimski's journal Ha-Tsfira, at the age of 16 (written at age 13). He went on to publish articles and poems in Ha-Shachar, Ha-Melitz, and Ha-Yom, and later edited Ha-Dor and Ha-Tkufa. In 1883 he published a Tohu va-Vohu ('Chaos and Emptiness'), a scathing criticism of Hebrew journalistic methods, especially directed against Ha-Melitz. He moved to Warsaw in the mid-1880s, where he wrote Otiyot porḥot ('Blossoming Letters'), a series of long stories. In 1886, he became an editor of Ha-Yom in St. Petersburg. Frischmann translated works of European literature into Hebrew, among them works by Nietzsche, Pushkin, Eliot, Shakespeare, Baudelaire, and Ibsen. At the same time he worked as a Yiddish journalist for the Warsaw Jewish newspapers Hoys-Fraynd, Der Yud, and Fraynd.

He visited the Land of Israel in 1911 and 1912 on behalf of the newspapers Ha-Tzefira and Haynt. Reports from his visits to Israel were collected in the book Sur la terre d'Israël ('On the Land of Israel', 1913), in which he described the landscapes, sacred places, and the revival of the Hebrew language. The impressions gathered there led him to believe in the future of Hebrew as a spoken language, although in his writings he remained faithful to classical Hebrew all his life.

== Published works ==
- Be-Yom Ha-Kipurim ('On the Day of Atonement'), Y. Alepin, 1881
- Tohu Va-Vohu ('Chaos and Void'), C. Kelter, 1883
- Otiyot Porchot: Sipurim, Reshimot ve-Tziyurim ('Flying Letters'), Ben Avigdor, 1892
- Michtavim Al Devar Ha-Sifrut ('Letters on Literature'), Achiasaf, 1895
- Ha-Golem: Ma'aseh ('The Golem'), Achiasaf, 1907
- Ketavim Niḥharim ('Selected Works'), Tushia, 1905
- Tziyurim u-Reshimot ('Drawings and Notes'), Moriah, 1910
- Ketavim Ḥadashim ('New Works'), Sifrut, 1910–1911
- Partzufim ('Portraits'), Sifrut, 1911
- Yizkor ('Remember'), Ben Avigdor, 1913
- Ba-Aretz ('In the Land of Israel'), Achi Sefer, 1913
- Col Kitvei ('Collected Works'), Merkaz, 1914
- Aḥarit Yerushalayim ('The End of Jerusalem'), Zionist Confederation in Poland, 1910
- Ba-Midbar ('In the Desert'), Ha-Sefer, 1923
- Kol Kitvei ('Collected Words'), Stybel, 1924

== See also ==
- Hebrew literature
- Journalism in Israel
