= Mikhail Gorlin =

Mikhail Gorlin

Mikhail Genrikhovich Gorlin (Russian: Михаи́л Ге́нрихович Го́рлин, IPA: [mʲɪxɐˈil ˈɡʲenrʲɪxəvʲɪdʑ ˈɡorlʲɪn]; 1909–1943) was a Russian emigre philologist and poet who founded the Berlin Poets' Club in 1928. He and his wife (the poet Raisa Blokh) later perished during World War II in a German concentration camp.

== Publications ==
1936. Puteshestviia. Berlin: Petropolis. (Poems)

== Literary archives ==
Some of Gorlin's writings and correspondence are held in the Vladimir Korvin-Piotrovskii Papers at the Beinecke Library, Yale University.
