= 1886 in Russia =

- Decades: 1860s; 1870s; 1880s; 1890s; 1900s
- See also: History of Russia; Timeline of Russian history; List of years in Russia

Events from the year 1886 in Russia.

== Incumbents ==
- Monarch – Alexander III

== Events ==
- The publication of Crime and Punishment by Fyodor Dostoyevsky
- Saint Petersburg Electrotechnical University
- Ha-Yom
- Saint Petersburg Electrotechnical University

== Births ==
- January 13 – Sophie Tucker, Russian-born American singer and comedian (d. 1966)
- February 7 – Yehezkel Abramsky, Russian-born British rabbi (d. 1976)
- March 15 – Sergey Kirov, Soviet revolutionary (d. 1934)
- March 27 – Wladimir Burliuk, Ukrainian artist (d. 1917)
- October 17 – Andrej Bicenko, Russian fresco painter and muralist (d. 1985)
