= Valentin Bianchi =

Russian ornithologist

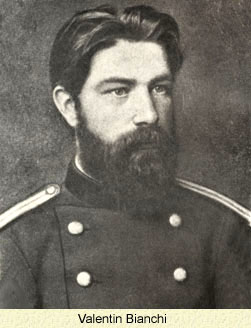
- Born: 18 February 1857; Moscow
- Died: 10 January 1920 (aged 62); Petrograd
- Known for: Birds of Middle Asia, Central Asia

Valentin Lvovich Bianchi (Russian: Валенти́н Льво́вич Биа́нки; 18 February 1857 – 10 January 1920) was a Russian ornithologist. He is honoured in the common and scientific names of Bianchi's warbler (Seicercus valentini), described by Ernst Hartert.

Of Italian descent, Bianchi graduated from the Imperial Military Medical Academy as a military doctor (1882). There years later, he was working as a general practitioner in the rural district of Staritsa, when Professor Eduard Brandt, learning about his interest in ornithology, invited him to join the staff of his alma mater. He moved to the Zoological Museum in 1887.

Bianchi was the Head of the Department of Ornithology at the Imperial Academy of Sciences from 1896 to 1920. He worked mainly on birds from Middle and Central Asia. An active member of the Russian Geographical Society, he took part in its major enterprises such as the Toll Expedition (1900) and the Kamchatka Expedition of 1908.

His son Vitaly Bianki was a renowned naturalist.

== Works ==
- 1891 – The birds of Gansu expedition of G.N. Potanin 1884–1887 (with Mikhail Mikhailovich Berezovsky)
- 1905 – Scientific results of the N.M. Przewalski expeditions to Central Asia
- 1907 – Materials for an avifauna of Mongolia and East Tibet
- 1911–1913 – The fauna of Russia (first volume), (two semi-volumes)
- 1905 – Orthoptera and Pseudoneuroptera of the Russian Empire (with Georgij Georgiewitsch Jacobson)
- 1909 – Instructions for collecting birds, their eggs and nests
