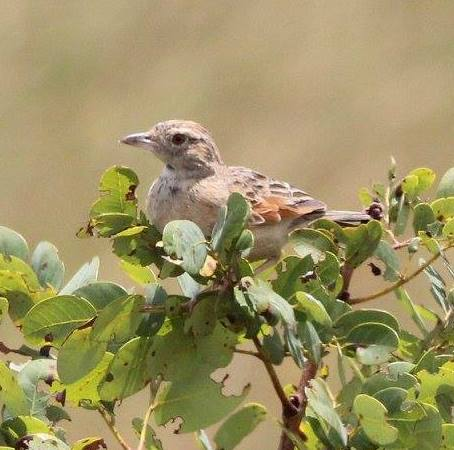

Conservation status
- Least Concern (IUCN 3.1)

Scientific classification
- Kingdom: Animalia
- Phylum: Chordata
- Class: Aves
- Order: Passeriformes
- Family: Alaudidae
- Genus: Amirafra
- Species: A. angolensis

Binomial name
- Amirafra angolensis (Barboza du Bocage, 1880)

Subspecies
- See text
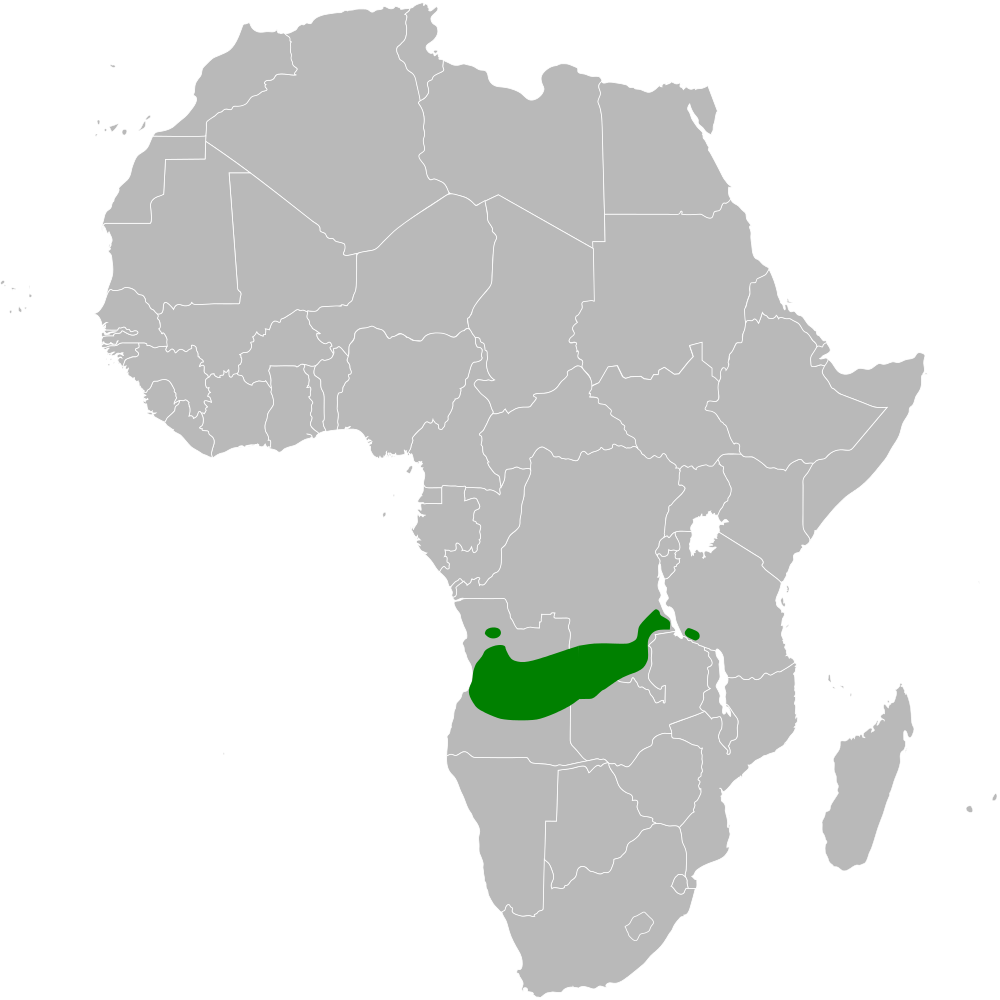
- resident range

= Angola lark =

Species of bird

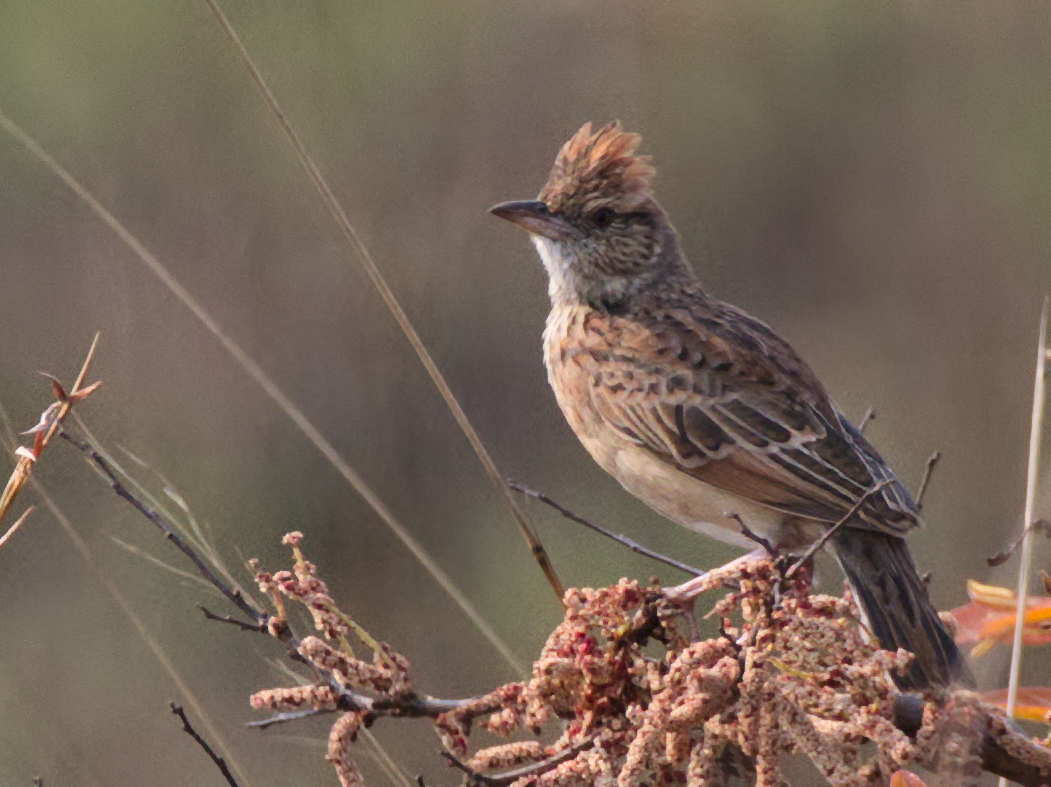
Angolan Lark

The Angola lark (Amirafra angolensis) or Angola bushlark is a species of lark in the family Alaudidae found in southern and central Africa.

== Taxonomy ==
The Angola lark was formerly placed in the genus Mirafra. It is one of three species that were moved to the resurrected genus Amirafra based on the results of a large molecular genetic study by the Swedish ornithologist Per Alström and collaborators that was published in 2023.

Three subspecies are recognised:

- A. a. marungensis (Hall, BP, 1958) – southeast DR Congo and southwest Tanzania
- A. a. angolensis (Barboza du Bocage, 1880) – north, west, central Angola
- A. a. antonii (Hall, BP, 1958) – east Angola to south DR Congo and northwest Zambia

== Distribution and habitat ==
The range of the Angola lark is sizable, and is found in Angola, Democratic Republic of Congo, Tanzania and Zambia. It is estimated to have a global extent of occurrence of about 170,000 square km. Its natural habitats are subtropical or tropical dry, or seasonally wet, lowland grassland.
