= Chinovnik =

Russians in the civil or court service (1722–1917)

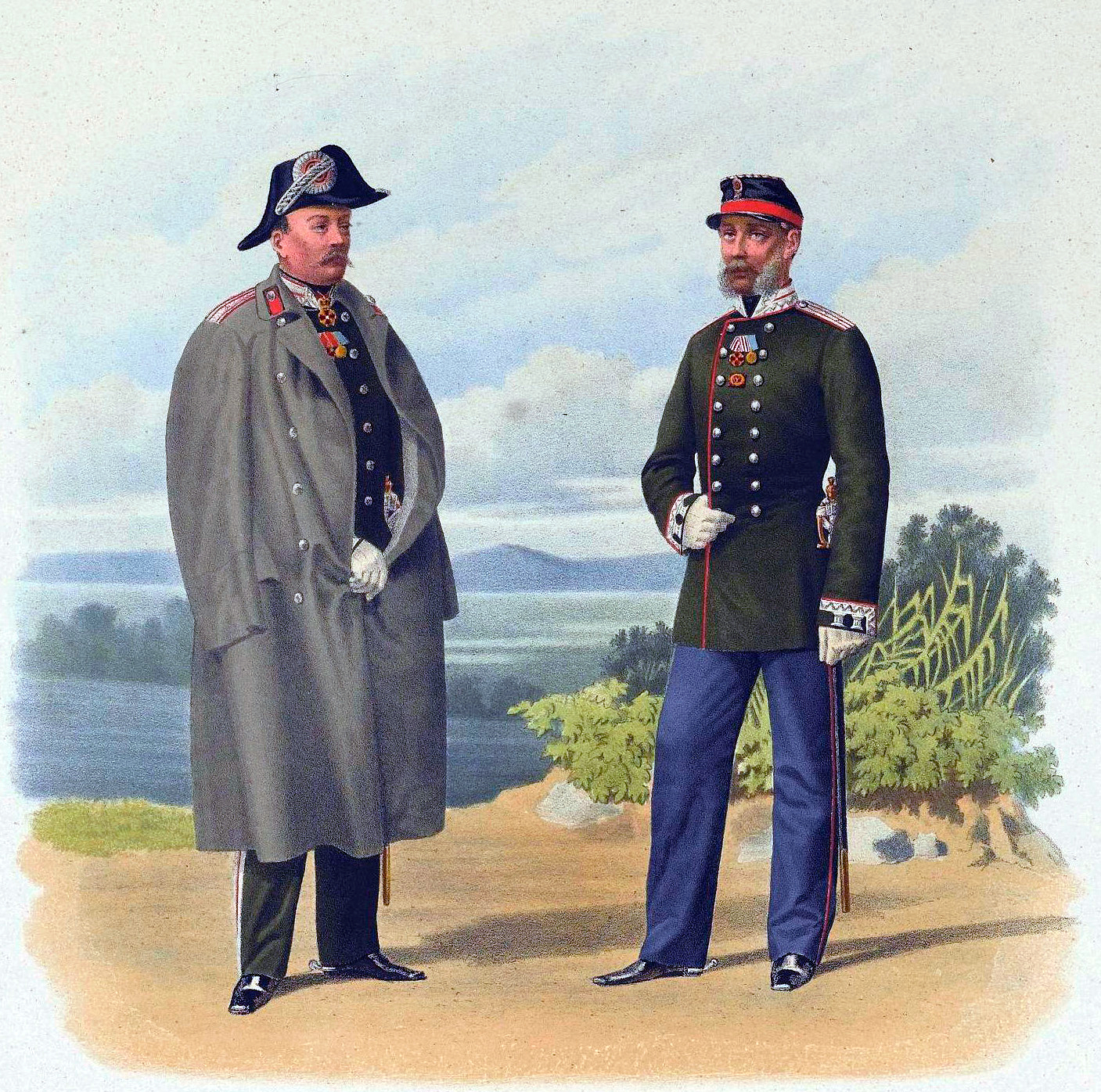
Karl Piratskiy. Chinovniks of the Ministry of War of 5 and 8 classes. 1863

The chinovnik (Note: Russian: Чиновник; Ukrainian: Чиновник, Chynovnyk; Belarusian: Чыноўнік, Čynownik; Kazakh: Шенеунік, Şeneunık) was a Russian title for a person having a rank and serving in the civil or court service, i.e. the Tsarist bureaucracy. The institution of chinovniks existed de facto in the Tsardom of Russia and the Russian Empire, but until 1722 it did not have a clear structure. The de jure chinovnik institute was structured by the establishment of the Table of Ranks on February 4, 1722.

"As the peasants were slaves of the landowners, the Russian people are still slaves of chinovniks", wrote Lenin in 1903, "Political freedom means the people's right to choose all the chinovniks themselves".

After the October Revolution of 1917, the Table of Ranks was abolished, and the institution of chinovniks was liquidated. Persons employed in the field of public administration became known as civil servants (Note: Russian: государственный служащий, romanized: gosudarstvenniy sluzhashchiy).

In modern Russia and some post-Soviet states, chinovnik has become an informal and sometimes critical term for any civil servant.

== Types ==
- A civilian chinovnik of the military department (military chinovnik or ordinary chinovnik) was a military officer wearing a class civilian rank. In addition to external signs (name of rank, uniform), it differs from the rank of military (officers) in that it is not necessary for him to consistently complete military service, starting with the lower rank. Subject to limited military jurisdiction: for crimes of office and violation of the rules of military discipline.
- The class chinovnik was a chinovnik who had the rank of a certain class or the right to it.
- The clerical chinovnik was a chinovnik who had a class rank and held a position in a public office that was not given a special name.

== Sources ==
- "Должность". Brockhaus and Efron Encyclopedic Dictionary: In 86 Volumes (82 Volumes and 4 Additional Volumes) (in Russian). St. Petersburg: F. A. Brockhaus. 1890–1907.
- State Service // Brockhaus and Efron Encyclopedic Dictionary: 86 volumes (82 volumes and 4 additional). – St. Petersburg, 1890–1907.
- Tatyana Efremova. New Dictionary of the Russian Language. Interpretive Word-Building (Efremova Dictionary).
- Dmitry Ushakov. Large Explanatory Dictionary of Modern Russian Language (Ushakov Dictionary).
