= Land Captain (Russian Empire) =

Group of officials in the Russian Empire

Land Captains (Russian: земские начальники, romanized: zemskie nachal'niki; singular: Russian: земский начальник, romanized: zemskii nachal'nik) were officials tasked with managing peasant communes in the Russian Empire between 1889 and 1917. The Land Captain Statute of 1889, issued during the reign of Emperor Alexander III, established the position, which "quickly became the basic unit of local administration, bringing the central government into closer contact with the peasantry than ever before". Holders of the post of Land Captain predominantly came from the ranks of the nobility.

== History ==
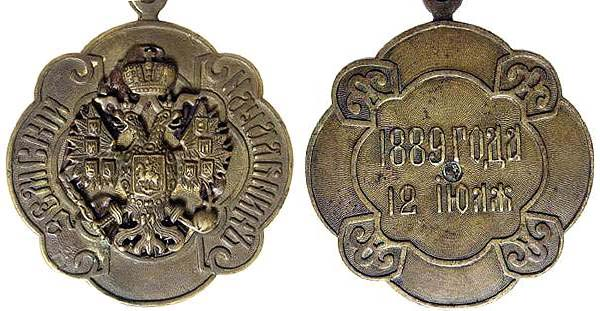
The badge of a land captain from Moscow Gubernia, Russian Empire, in 1889.

In 1889 Tsar Alexander III promulgated the Land Captain Statute of 1889, abolishing the old position of justice of the peace in the regions of the Russian Empire and creating the position of land captain to exercise a variety of administrative and judicial functions in the regions of the empire. The statute had immense impact on the lives of Russian peasants and is regarded as the "foremost legislative achievement of Alexander III's reign". Each land captain was assigned to a volost. Captains had the tasks of overseeing traditional village assemblies and of exercising local judicial functions that had previously been given to village assemblies. The 1889 Statute has been perceived not as a liberalizing measure, but rather as a "counterreform" intended to reduce peasant self-government and impose increased government control of the rural peasantry. Despite their poor reputation, in terms of education and ability the land captains were probably no worse on average than other tsarist officials working at the local level at the time.

According to historian Orlando Figes there were 2,000 land captains throughout the Russian Empire. In spite of the stated aim of employing members of the nobility with administrative experience, the position of land captain was poorly paid and unattractive for talented noblemen and many captains were little-educated, inexperienced and incompetent. In Tula province between 1891 and 1899 alone more than 2,000 punishments for insubordination were meted out by land captains on the peasantry. Only about 30 percent of the captains had any kind of higher education, including military education. In response to significant criticism among the tsarist elite of the captains' behavior, in 1905 the Interior Ministry introduced a set of regulations to better regulate the conduct of the captains and prevent arbitrary cruelty. The Ministry proceeded to strip back some of the powers of the land captains, abolishing their judicial powers at least nominally in 1912.

Following the overthrow of the tsar in the February Revolution, the position of land captain was abolished by the Provisional Government in March 1917.

== Assessment ==
The institution of land captain has been received very negatively. The introduction of land captains failed as an attempt to reduce the authority of peasant communes and consolidating state control over the regions. Orlando Figes has written that as the "central agents of the tsarist regime in the countryside until 1917", land captains became hated for frequently mistreating and flogging the peasants in their charge and were "widely reviled" as the "personification of autocracy in the localities". According to David Macey, both contemporary and subsequent assessments of the land captains have treated them with "near-universal vilification".

== See also ==
- Volost
- Tsarist bureaucracy
- Obshchina
- Gradonachalstvo
