= 1890 in Russia =

- Decades: 1870s; 1880s; 1890s; 1900s; 1910s
- See also: History of Russia; Timeline of Russian history; List of years in Russia

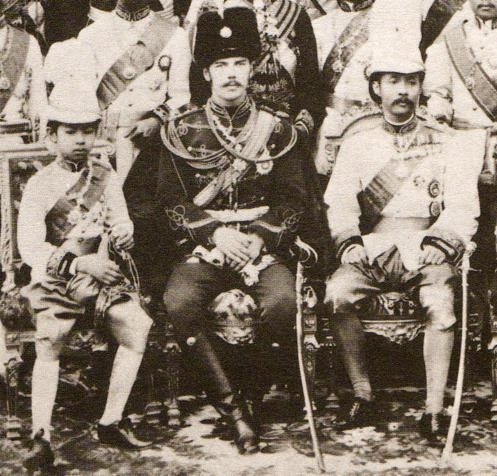
Emperor Nicholas II (then Tsesarevich) in Siam with Crown Prince Maha Vajirunhis (left) and King Chulalongkorn (right), March 1891

Events from the year 1890 in Russia.

== Incumbents ==
- Monarch – Alexander III

== Events ==
- Eastern journey of Nicholas II
- Gugunian Expedition
- Armenian Revolutionary Federation
- Haji Alakbar Mosque
- Rakvere Lihakombinaat
- Saint Petersburg Mathematical Society
- The Kreutzer Sonata
- Brockhaus and Efron Encyclopedic Dictionary

== Births ==
- January 20 - Boris Kozo-Polyansky, botanist and evolutionary biologist (d. 1957)
- February 10 – Boris Pasternak, writer (Doctor Zhivago), Nobel Prize laureate (declined) (d. 1960)
- March 9 (new style) - Vyacheslav Molotov, Soviet politician (d. 1986)
- April 18 – Grand Duchess Maria Pavlovna of Russia (d.1958)
- May 27 – Konstantin Ivanov, poet and important figure in Chuvash literature (d.1915)
- August 3 – Konstantin Melnikov, avant-garde architect (d. 1974)
- August 13 – Lydia Zvereva, first Russian woman to earn a pilot's licence (d. 1916)
- November 9 – Grigory Kulik, Soviet military officer, Marshal of the Soviet Union (d. 1950)
- November 23 – El Lissitzky, Russian artist and architect (d. 1941)

== Deaths ==
- April 1 – Alexander Mozhaysky, an admiral in the Imperial Russian Navy, an aviation pioneer, and a researcher and designer of heavier-than-air craft (b. 1825)
- December 18 – Grigory Danilevsky, historical novelist, and Privy Councillor of Russia (b. 1829)
