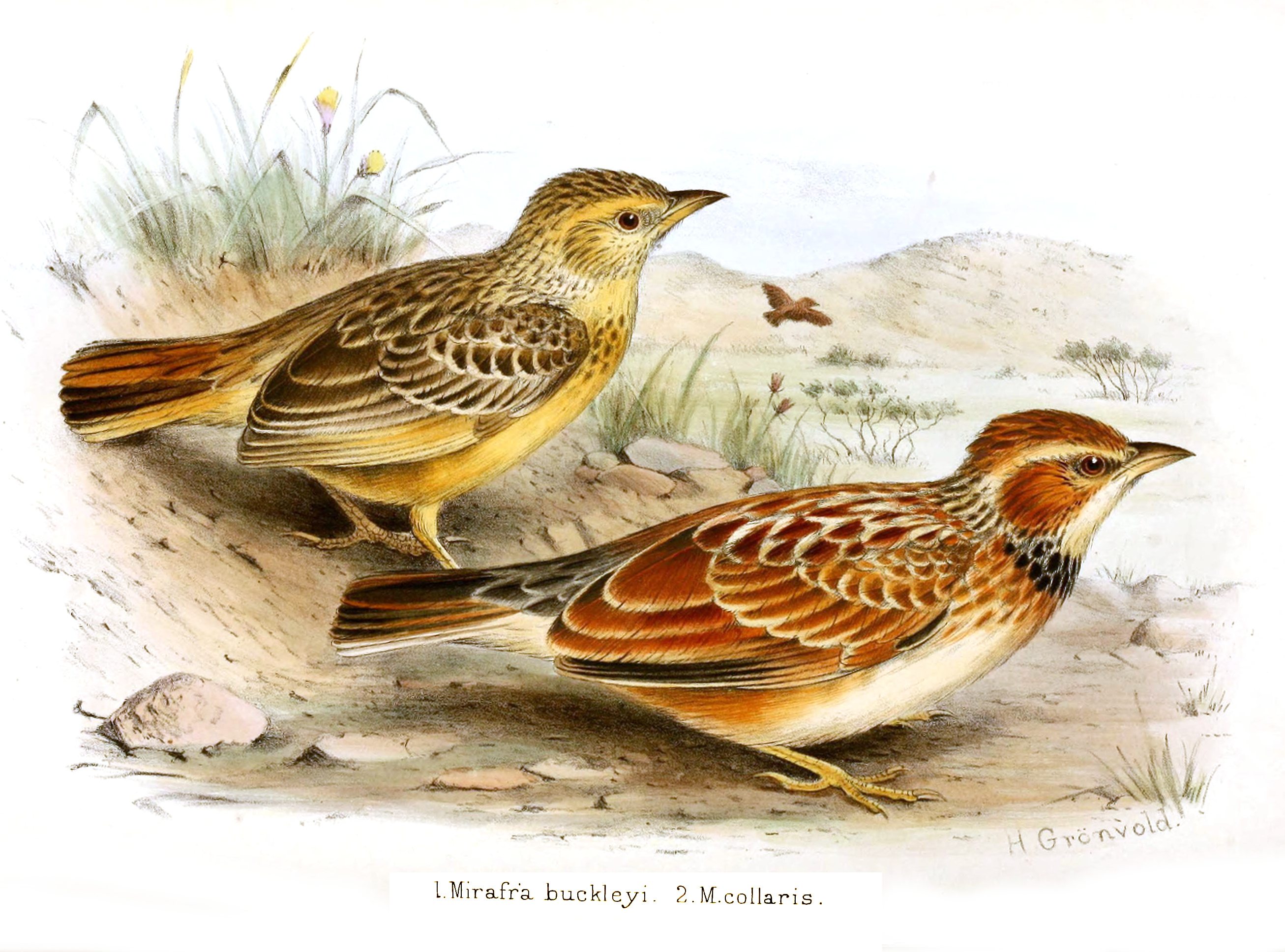

Conservation status
- Least Concern (IUCN 3.1)

Scientific classification
- Kingdom: Animalia
- Phylum: Chordata
- Class: Aves
- Order: Passeriformes
- Family: Alaudidae
- Genus: Amirafra
- Species: A. collaris

Binomial name
- Amirafra collaris (Sharpe, 1896)
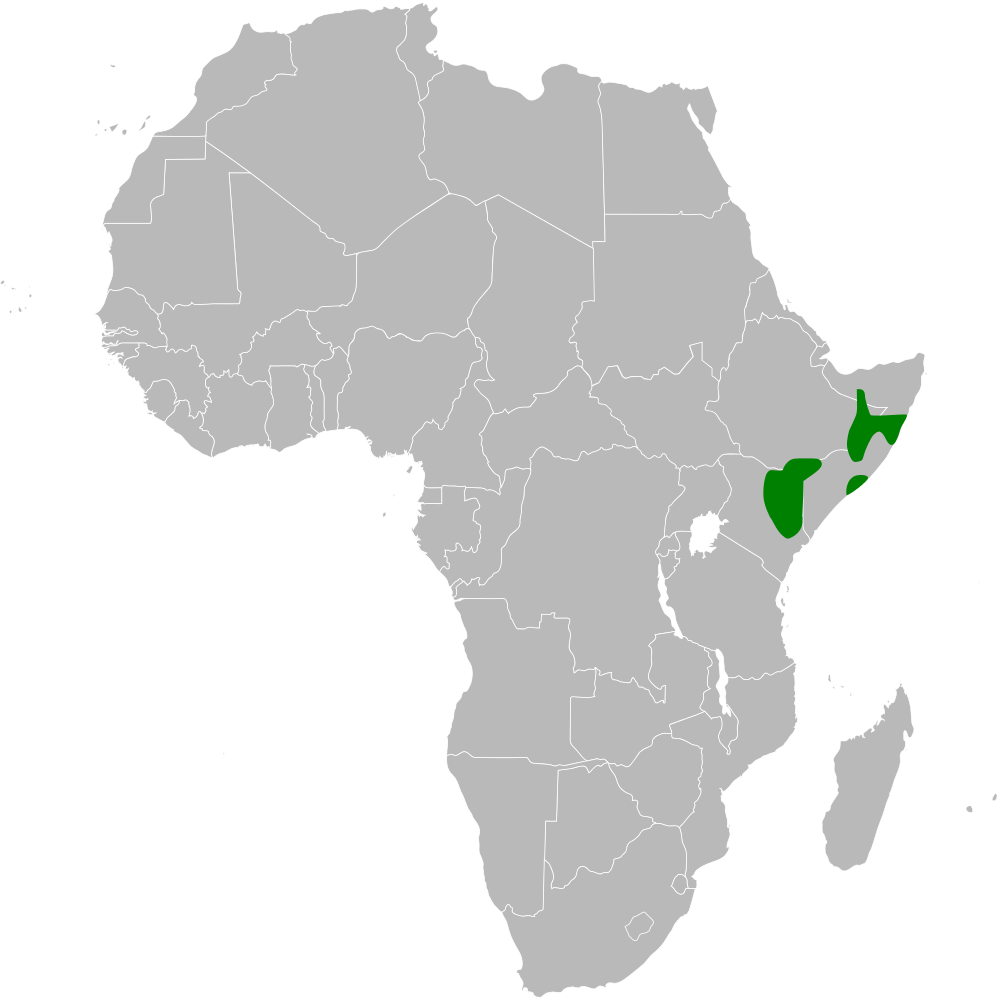

= Collared lark =

Species of bird

The collared lark (Amirafra collaris) or collared bushlark is a species of lark in the family Alaudidae found in East Africa.

== Taxonomy ==
The collared lark was formerly placed in the genus Mirafra. It is one of three species that were moved to the resurrected genus Amirafra based on the results of a large molecular genetic study by the Swedish ornithologist Per Alström and collaborators that was published in 2023. The species is monotypic: no subspecies are recognised.

== Distribution and habitat ==
The collared lark has a considerable range, with an estimated global extent of occurrence of 530,000 km^{2} over an area from eastern Ethiopia and Somalia to central Kenya.

Its natural habitat is subtropical or tropical dry lowland grassland.
