= 1889 in Russia =

- Decades: 1860s; 1870s; 1880s; 1890s; 1900s
- See also: History of Russia; Timeline of Russian history; List of years in Russia

Events from the year 1889 in Russia.

== Incumbents ==
- Monarch – Alexander III

== Events ==
- 1889 Russian flu pandemic
- Angleterre Hotel
- Kansallis-Osake-Pankki
- The Land Captain Statute

== Births ==
- 2 February – Vasily Struve, historian, a Soviet orientalist from the Struve family (died 1965)
- 4 February – Pitirim Sorokin, sociologist, member of the Russian Constituent Assembly
- 24 February – Aleksei Dikiy, historian, actor and director (died 1955)
- 28 February – Pavel Dybenko, a Bolshevik revolutionary and a leading Soviet officer and military commander (died 1938)
- 19 March – Boris Gerasimovich, a Soviet astronomer and astrophysicist (died 1937)
- 20 March – Alexander Vertinsky, historian, a Russian and Soviet artist, poet, singer, composer, cabaret artist and actor (died 1957)
- 14 October – Natalia Martirosyan, engineer (died 1960)
- 25 November – Yan Berzin, politician and military intelligence officer (died 1938)

== Deaths ==
- 22 April – Vasily Kokorev, one of the wealthiest men in Russia, entrepreneur, philanthropist and art collector (born 1817)
- 7 May – Dmitry Tolstoy, a politician and a member of the State Council of Imperial Russia (born 1823)
- 10 May – Mikhail Saltykov-Shchedrin, a major Russian writer and satirist of the 19th century (born 1826)
- 20 August – Andrey Krayevsky, publisher and journalist (born 1810)
- 29 October – Nikolay Chernyshevsky, a literary and social critic, journalist, novelist, democrat, and socialist philosopher (born 1828)
- 8 November – Nadezhda Sigida, a Russian revolutionary, heroine of the Kara katorga tragedy of 1889 (born 1862)
