= 1885 in Russia =

- Decades: 1860s; 1870s; 1880s; 1890s; 1900s
- See also: History of Russia; Timeline of Russian history; List of years in Russia

Events from the year 1885 in Russia.

== Incumbents ==
- Monarch – Alexander III

== Events ==
- Kharkiv Polytechnic Institute
- Nobles' Land Bank
- Radishchev Art Museum
- Private Opera

== Births ==
- 8 January: Viktor Pepelyayev
- 29 August: David Zolotarev
- 24 September: Moyshe Katz (writer, born 1885)
- 7 November: Sabina Spielrein
- 9 November: Velimir Khlebnikov
- 28 December: Vladimir Tatlin

== Deaths ==
- 19 April - Mykola Kostomarov
- 28 April: Vladimir Pecherin
- 5 May - Konstantin Kavelin
- 5 November: Nikolai Severtsov
