= 1884 in Russia =

- Decades: 1860s; 1870s; 1880s; 1890s; 1900s
- See also: History of Russia; Timeline of Russian history; List of years in Russia

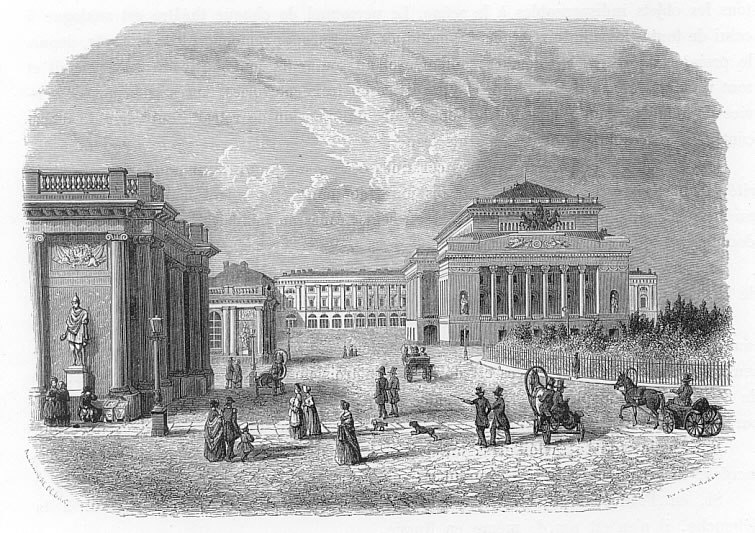
Alexandrinsky theatre in Saint Petersburg

Events from 1884 in Russia.

== Incumbents ==
- Monarch – Alexander III

== Events ==
Political developments:

- Russia–Korea Treaty of 1884
- Trial of the Fourteen

Cultural and Architectural Developments:

- Establishment of Academicheskaya Dacha
- Founding of Shamordino Convent

== Births ==
- January 2 – Ben-Zion Dinur, Russian-born Israeli educator, historian and politician (d. 1973)
- February 1 - Yevgeny Zamyatin, Russian author (d. 1937)
- February 12 – Marie Vassilieff, Russian artist (d. 1957)
- July 18 – Alexandra Tolstaya, Russian activist (d. 1979)
- December 14 – Nicholas Charnetsky, Orthodox priest, bishop, martyr and blessed (d. 1959)

== Deaths ==
- 21 January – La Païva, Russian-born French courtesan and society figure (b. 1819)
- 23 March – Dmitry Staroselsky, Russian lieutenant general and Governor of Baku (b. 1832)
- 30 March – Alexander Dmitrievich Mikhailov, Russian revolutionary and populist (b. 1855)
- 29 December - Aleksey Uvarov, Russian archaeologist.
