= 1883 in Russia =

- Decades: 1860s; 1870s; 1880s; 1890s; 1900s
- See also: History of Russia; Timeline of Russian history; List of years in Russia

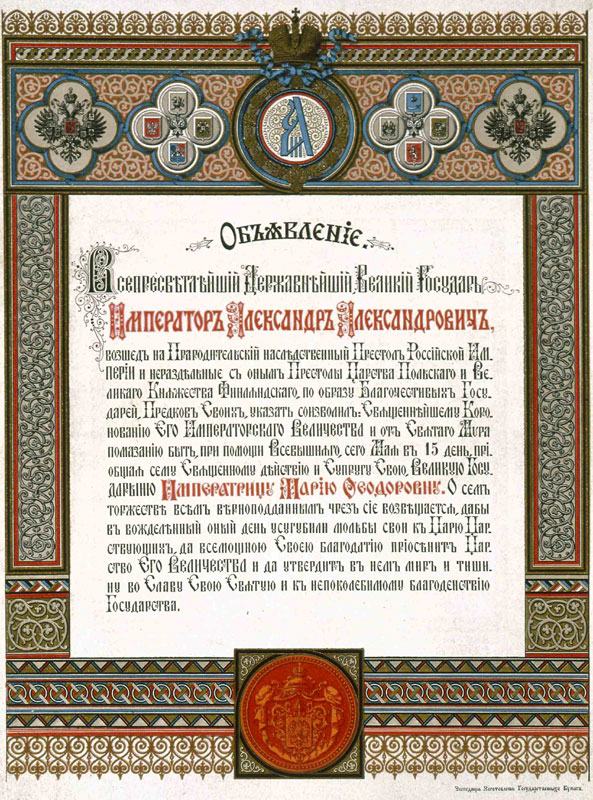
Alexander III coronation document

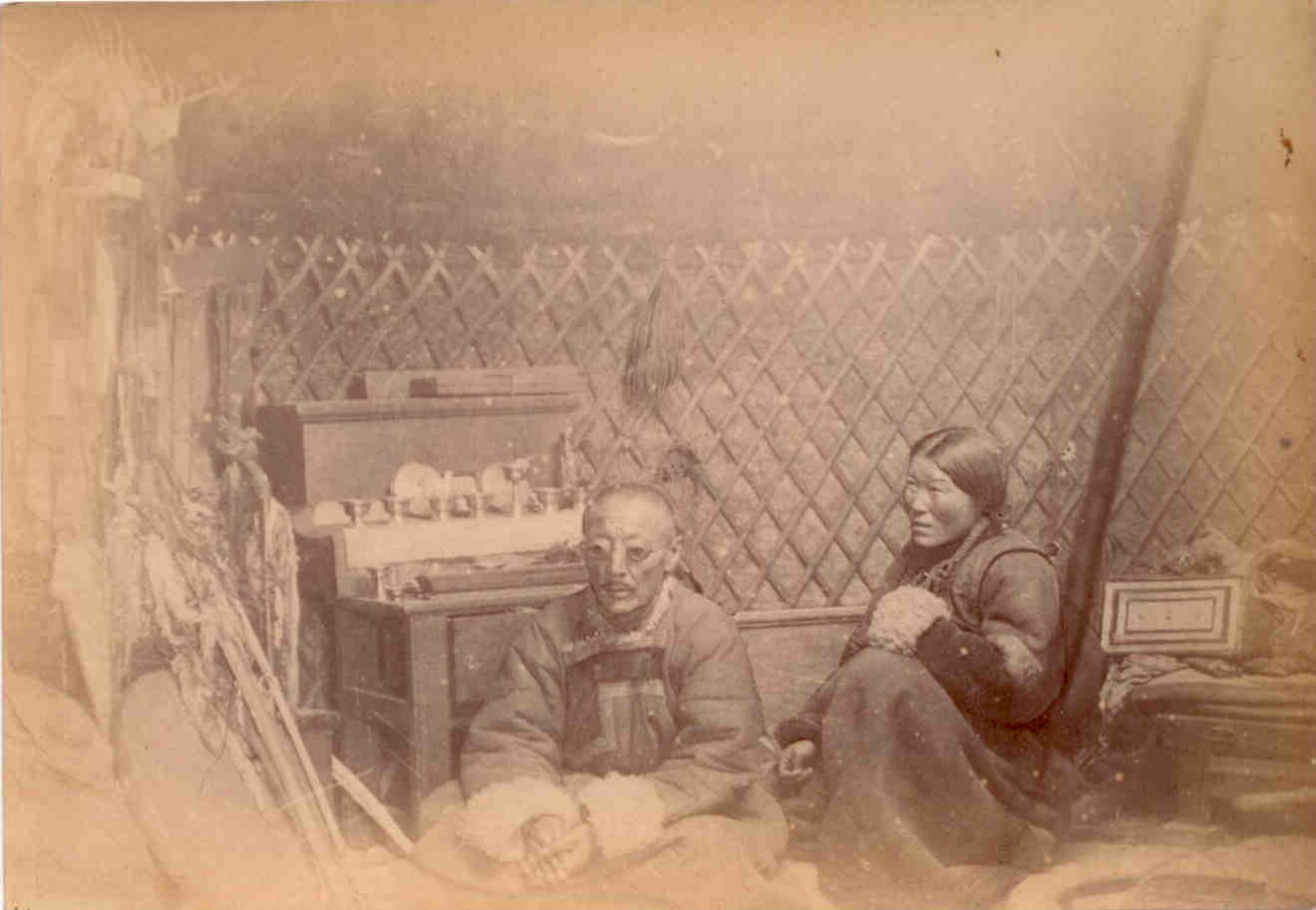
Intérieur de la yourte d'un chaman

Events from 1883 in Russia.

== Incumbents ==
- Monarch – Alexander III

== Events ==
- Cathedral of Christ the Saviour (completed)
- Emancipation of Labour
- Hugo Treffner Gymnasium
- Moscow Society of Stamp Collectors

== Births ==
- 10 January – Aleksei Nikolaevich Tolstoy, Russian writer (d. 1945)
- 3 April – Nikolai Kuzmin, Soviet political and military leader (d. 1938)
- 25 April – Semyon Budyonny, Cossack cavalryman, Marshal of the Soviet Union (d. 1973)
- 18 July – Lev Kamenev, Russian revolutionary (d. 1936)
- 19 August – Leonid Kulik, Russian mineralogist (d. 1942)
- 14 November – Ado Birk, 3rd Prime Minister of Estonia (d. 1942)
- 29 November – Lev Galler, Soviet admiral (d. 1950)
- 16 December – Vasili Altfater, Russian and Soviet admiral (d. 1919)
- Ivan Bardin, Soviet metallurgist

== Deaths ==
- Pyotr Pavlovich Albedinsky
- Alexander Gorchakov
