= 1888 in Russia =

- Decades: 1860s; 1870s; 1880s; 1890s; 1900s
- See also: History of Russia; Timeline of Russian history; List of years in Russia

Three notable events occurred in 1888 in Russia, under Alexander III.

== Events ==
- 29 October – Borki train disaster.

=== First editions ===
- Pochtovo-Telegrafnyi Zhurnal
- Semya i Shkola

== Births ==
- 5 April – Varvara Brilliant-Lerman, plant physiologist (died 1954).
