= 1887 in Russia =

- Decades: 1860s; 1870s; 1880s; 1890s; 1900s
- See also: History of Russia; Timeline of Russian history; List of years in Russia

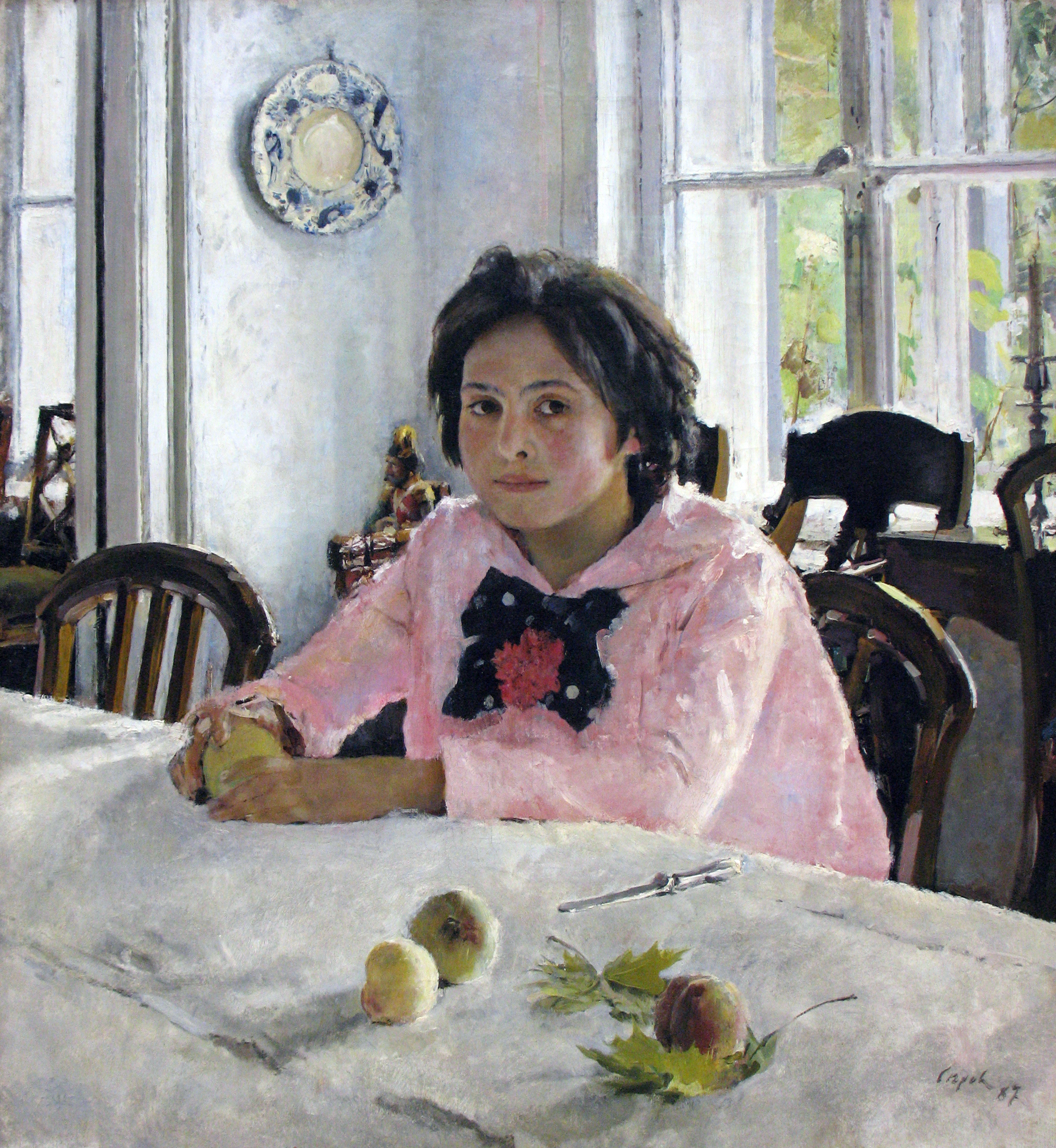
1887 Serow Maedchen mit Pfirsichen anagoria

Events from the year 1887 in Russia.

== Incumbents ==
- Monarch – Alexander III

== Events ==
- Reinsurance Treaty
- Ashgabat (park)
- Saint Gregory the Illuminator's Church, Baku
- Defence Forces Cemetery of Tallinn

== Births ==
- January 28 - Vasily Chapayev, soldier and Red Army commander during the Russian Civil War.
- February 21 – Savielly Tartakower, chess grandmaster (d. 1956)
- Samuil Marshak, writer and poet
- Marc Chagall, artist
- Nikolai Vavilov, botanist and geneticist

== Deaths ==
- Alexander Borodin
- Ivan Kramskoi, painter.
- Mikhail Katkov, journalist
- Semyon Nadson, poet
