= Moyshe Katz (writer, born 1885) =

Russian-American writer in the Yiddish language (1885–1960)

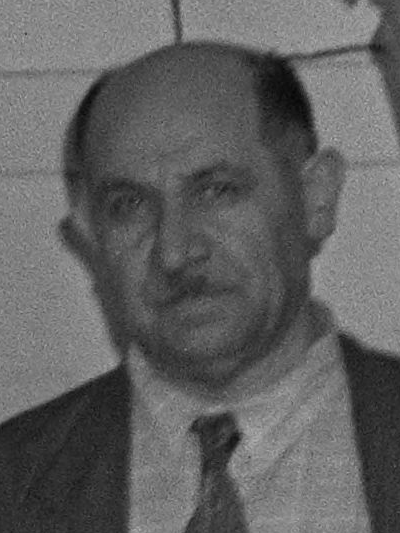
- Katz in 1943
- Born: September 24, 1885; Dokshytsy, Russian Empire
- Died: June 3, 1960 (aged 74); Moscow, Russian SFSR, Soviet Union

Moyshe Katz (September 24, 1885 – June 3, 1960) was a Russian-American writer, Zionist, and proponent of Yiddish culture.

== Life and career ==
Moyshe Katz was born September 24, 1885, in Dokshytsy, Belorussia, and was raised in Mykolaiv (now southern Ukraine). Katz's studies included a religious elementary school, a private tutor, a Russian Jewish state school, and university. His father was a tailor active in the community and in Zionism, as was Katz. They were both arrested in 1903, the year Katz graduated high school, for participating in an illegal Zionist educational group. Katz joined the first Zionist socialist group in the region following the Kishinev pogrom. He was arrested several other times: for arming Jewish self-defense groups in Uman against the Black Hundreds, and for other revolutionary actions in Vilnius, Warsaw, and Minsk.

His early articles were for a Russian Jewish weekly, beginning in 1904. The next year he began writing in Yiddish instead of Russian. He contributed to several Yiddish Zionist socialist publications. Between 1908 and 1910, Katz lived in Palestine and Egypt, where he continued to publish with Cairo's weekly Di tsayt (The Times). Katz wrote for the Warsaw daily newspaper Der fraynd (The Friend) and other Yiddish publications published in Russia. Upon his return, he was involved in politics in St. Petersburg and Warsaw.

Political pressure compelled him to leave for the United States in mid-1913. In New York, he was the editor of the weekly Unzer vort (Our Word), a contributor to Der tog (The Day), and a foreign correspondent for Yiddish periodicals in Johannesburg, Vilnius, Saint Petersburg, and Kiev. He was also on the board of Chaim Zhitlowsky's Dos Naye Leben (The New Life).

He would return again To Russia after the 1917 February Revolution. After the October Revolution, he settled in Kiev and was active in local Jewish life there through 1920. Katz was a spokesperson for the United Jewish Socialist Workers Party, and advocated for his party not to unite with Jewish Communists. He edited the party's daily publication (Di naye tsayt [The New Times]) and a children's magazine. Katz founded the Jewish Cultural League in Ukraine and represented the Jewish branch of the Kiev's state publisher.

In 1920, Katz returned to the United States. He wrote about Soviet Russia for Forverts and was the literary editor for the Fraye Arbeter Shtime. Katz was part of the Salutsky–Olgin faction following the 1921 Jewish Socialist Federation split, and would join the American Jewish Communist movement, founding several political institutions. He was a major contributor to Olgin's Communist Morgn Frayhayt, with thousands of articlces, features, narratives, and essays. Katz became a prominent activist for Yiddish culture. He was the first chair of the Yiddish writers' union Proletpen. Katz returned to Russia, for a third time, from 1926 to 1933, living in Moscow, but came back to the United States in 1933 when asked by the Morgen Freiheit Yiddish newspaper. He contributed to numerous Yiddish and Communist-adjacent periodicals in the United States and abroad.

At the end of his life, he returned to Moscow in May 1960 to see his family and died there on June 3 at the age of 74.

== Bibliography ==
- Fox, Chaim Leib (1956). "Moyshe Katz". In Niger, Samuel; Shatzky, Jacob (eds.). Leḳsiḳon fun der nayer Yidisher liṭeraṭur (in Yiddish). Translated by Fogel, Joshua A. New York: Alṿelṭlekhn Yidishn ḳulṭur-ḳongres. OCLC 4421599.
- Katz, Moishe (2012). The Generation that Lost its Fear: A Memoir of Jewish Self-Defense and Revolutionary Activism in Tsarist Russia. Translated by Lyber Katz.
