= Liubov Kemularia-Nathadze =

Georgian botanist (1891–1985)

Liubov Manucharovna Kemularia-Nathadze (Georgian: ლუბა მანუჩარის ასული კემულარია-ნათაძე; February 14, 1891 – February 19, 1985) was a Georgian botanist noted for collecting and describing plants of Georgia. The standard author abbreviation Kem.-Nath. is used to indicate this person as the author when citing a botanical name.
