= Valentina Khmel =

- Валентина Хмель
- Born: Valentina Petrovna Khmel; 28 February 1939 (age 87); Chita Oblast, Russian SFSR, Soviet Union
- Occupation: Painter-plasterer
- Awards: Order of Labour Glory (x3)

Valentina Petrovna Khmel (Russian: Валентина Петровна Хмель; born 28 February 1939) is a Russian painter-plasterer and politician. She was a painter-plasterer and later formeman of finishers at the Construction and Assembly Department No. 5 of the Angarsk Construction Department of the Ministry of Medium Machine-Building in the Irkutsk Oblast. Khmel was a people's deputy of the Congress of People's Deputies of the Soviet Union from the Communist Party of the Soviet Union and was a member of the Supreme Soviet of the Soviet Union from 1989 to 1991. Khmel was a recipient of all three classes of the Order of Labour Glory.

== Biography ==
Khmel was born on 28 February 1939 in Chita Oblast (today the Trans-Baikal Territory). During her youth, she moved to Angarsk in 1955. Khmel attended Vocational School No. 10, graduating in 1956. She began working at the Construction and Assembly Department No. 5 (SMU-5) of the Angarsk Construction Department (AUS) of the Ministry of Medium Machine-Building in the Irkutsk Oblast as a painter and plasterer. In 1976, she was appointed foreman of finishers at the facility and joined the Communist Party of the Soviet Union (CPSU) as a member. Khmel provided team with inspiration to exceed their objectives ahead of their published schedules.

She served three convocations as a deputy of the Irkutsk Regional Council as well as the Angarsk City Council and as a member of the Bureau of the Irkutsk Regional Committee of the CPSU. Khmel was a Delegate to the 27th Congress of the Communist Party of the Soviet Union in 1986. Between 1989 and 1991, she was a people's deputy of the Congress of People's Deputies of the Soviet Union from the Communist Party of the Soviet Union and was elected to serve as a member of the Supreme Soviet of the Soviet Union. Khmel was part of one of the first government delegations of the congress to travel to the United States in Kingsburg, California; she was the first resident of Angarsk to visit the United States. From 1990, she was a member of the Union Council Commission on Labour, Prices and Social Policy.

== Personal life ==
Khmel is married.

== Awards ==
She received the "Best Painter" Prize from the Ministry of Medium Machine-Building. Khmel was awarded all three classes of the Order of Labour Glory by decrees of the Presidium of the Supreme Soviet of the Soviet Union from 1976 to 1984. She was also made a Cavalier of the Order of Labour Glory when she was made first class of the Order of Labour Glory. Khmel was a recipient of the Public Incentive Badge in November 2012, and of the public recognition badge 80 Years of the Irkutsk Region "for socially significant public activities, high results in the development of the economy, production, science and other areas of activity that contribute to the development and enhancement of the authority of the region" in April 2018.
