= Vasily Baksheev =

- Василий Бакшеев
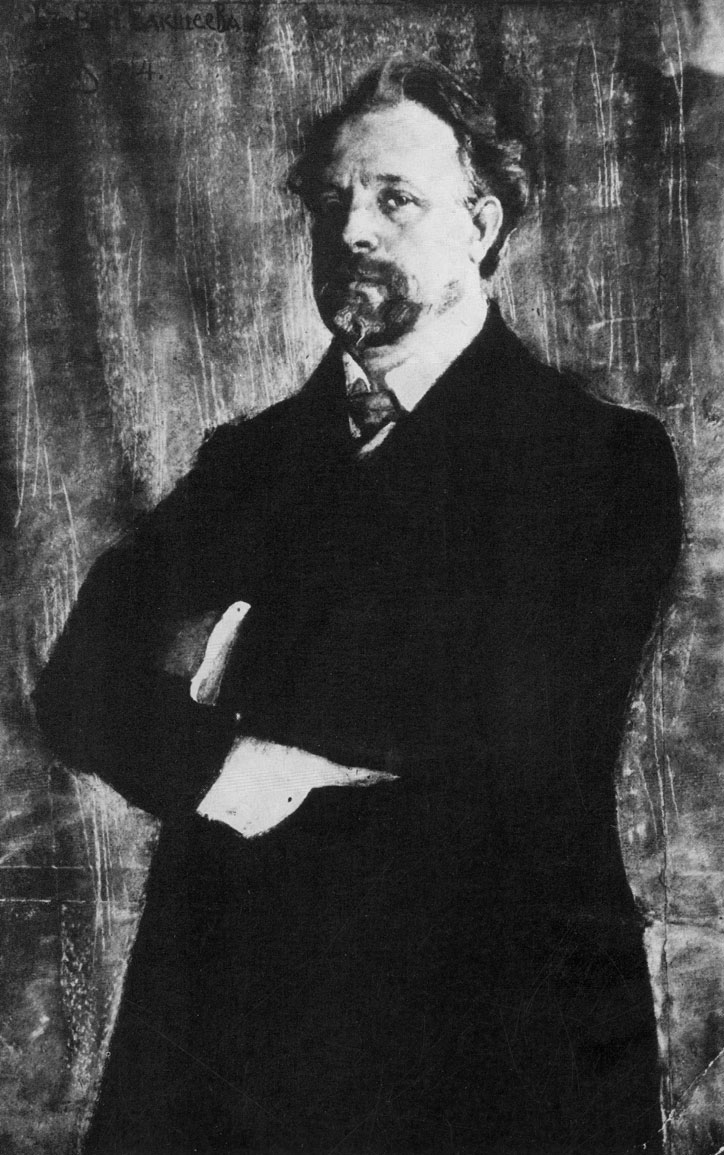
- Born: 12 December 1862; Moscow, Russian Empire
- Died: 28 September 1958 (aged 95); Moscow, Russian SFSR, Soviet Union
- Resting place: Novodevichy Cemetery
- Movement: Socialist realism

Vasily Nikolaevich Baksheev (Russian: Василий Николаевич Бакшеев; December 12, 1862, Moscow – September 28, 1958, Moscow) was a Russian and Soviet landscape painter, a representative of Moscow academicism, associated with the late wave of the Peredvizhniki (Wanderers), and a teacher. He was an Academician of the Imperial Academy of Arts (since 1913) and one of the first full members of the USSR Academy of Arts (since 1947). He was also a People's Artist of the USSR (1956) and a laureate of the Stalin Prize, second degree (1943).

== Biography ==
Vasily Baksheev was born on December 12 (24), 1862, to the family of Nikolai Fyodorovich Baksheev (1822–1875), a Moscow Governorate nobleman and Titular Councilor.

In 1877, he entered the architecture department of the Moscow School of Painting, Sculpture and Architecture, where his older brother, Fyodor (c. 1849–1876), had previously graduated. However, he later transferred to the painting department. His teachers were Vladimir Makovsky and Alexei Savrasov.

In 1888, upon graduating from the school, he received the title of class artist for his painting "Return from Pilgrim's Journey". In 1894, he began teaching at the Moscow School of Painting, Sculpture, and Architecture and worked there for over 20 years (until 1918).

In 1896, he was elected a member of the Peredvizhniki (Wanderers) exhibitions (an exhibitor since 1891). In 1913, he received the title of Academician of Painting. He was a member of the "Peredvizhniki Association" and one of the organizers of the Union of Russian Artists (1903). After the October Revolution, he participated in the organization of Moscow's regional museums.

He spent approximately 40 years of his life in the village of Zaitsevo, now in the Odintsovo District of the Moscow Oblast. He arrived in Zaitsevo as a student in 1887. The estate of his lawyer friend, S. A. Losev, was located there. Losev's sister, the beautiful fifteen-year-old Anna, impressed the young artist, and he painted her portrait, "Girl Feeding Pigeons". He exhibited this work at a student exhibition. Pavel Tretyakov visited the exhibition, liked the painting, and acquired it for his collection. In 1892, the artist married Anna Alekseevna.

In 1903, he built a two-story wooden house of his own design on 4th Rostovsky Lane, where he lived for over half a century.

He was a full member of the USSR Academy of Arts (1947).

He died on September 28, 1958, in Moscow; he is buried in Novodevichy Cemetery (section No. 3).

In 1961, his "Memoirs" were published in Moscow.

== Awards ==
- Honoured Artist of the RSFSR (1937)
- People's Artist of the RSFSR (1947)
- People's Artist of the USSR (1956)
- Stalin Prize, Second Class (1943) — for outstanding achievements in art
- Two Orders of Lenin (including 1953))
- Order of the Red Banner of Labour (1943)
- Medal "For Valiant Labour in the Great Patriotic War 1941–1945"
