= Raisa Blokh =

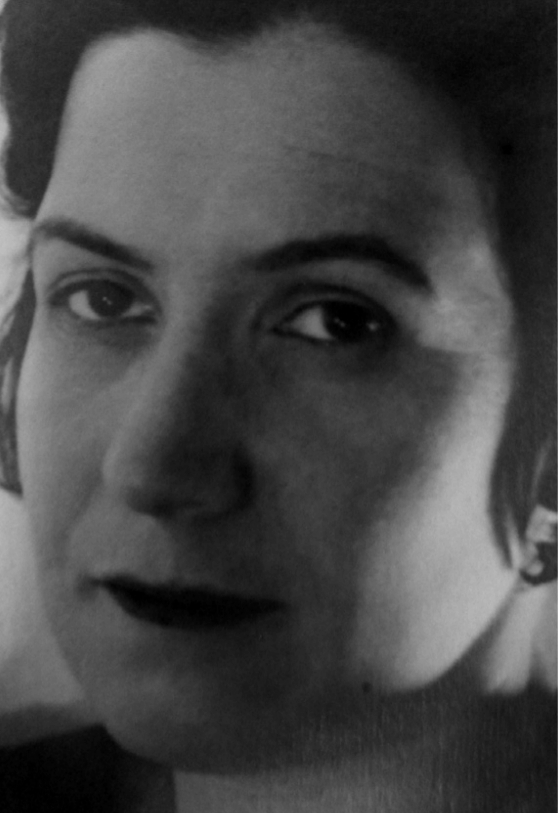
Raisa Blokh

Raisa Noevna Blokh (Russian: Раиса Ноевна Блох; 1898–1943) was a Russian poet. She emigrated to Berlin in the 1920s where she was active in the Berlin Poets' Club along with her husband Mikhail Gorlin. Blokh published her poetry in several Russian emigre literary journals including Sovremennye zapiski and Chisla.

Mikhail and Raisa arrived in Paris from Berlin in 1934-1935.

During the Nazi occupation of France in 1941, Mikhail was interned in the Pithiviers camp. Despite her best efforts, Raisa was unable to prevent her husband from being deported. He was deported by Convoy No. 6 on 17 July 1942 from Pithiviers to Auschwitz. He was 33 years old.

In the spring of 1942, she accompanied young Polish Jewish women, arriving with Doctor and Mrs Marklin, at the Vic-sur-Cère accommodation centre founded by the Œuvre de secours aux enfants (OSE), where she became the head teacher under the pseudonym of Michelle Miraille, a French national.

She was arrested when she tried to cross into Switzerland at Certoux, but was turned back at Annemasse. She was deported to Auschwitz on convoy no. 62.

== Writings ==
- 1928. Moi Gorod. Berlin: Petropolis.
- 1935. Tishina: stikhi 1928–1934 (With Mirra Borodina). Berlin: Petropolis.
- 1939. Zaviety: stikhotvoreniia. Brussels: Petropolis.
