= Chuvash literature =

Chuvash literature (Chuvash: Чӑваш литератури, romanized: Çăvaş literaturi) is literature written in the Chuvash language, regardless of the ethnic origin of the authors or the place of publication. This term applies to fictional works, but does not include folklore.

== History ==
The Chuvash language is the only surviving dialect of the Oghur or Bulgar branch of the Turkic languages.

The oldest known Chuvash texts appear on gravestones left by the Volga Bulgars in the 13th and 14th centuries in the Middle Volga region, during the rule of the Golden Horde. Most of the epitaphs on the tombstones were written in Oghur languages, of which Chuvash is the only extant member. While these epitaphs cannot be considered full-fledged literary works, they do record the Chuvash language of the Golden Horde.

=== 18th century – early 19th century ===
More artistic texts in the Chuvash languages began to appear in the 18th century, with the emergence of the Chuvash alphabet. For example, one 1767 poem by an anonymous writer praised Catherine the Great, Empress of Russia:

Пелмастапар абирь тя минь барас парня,
Сана, чиберь патша, пора-мырынь Ання,
Jоратнышан пире. Пелмаста мар хальчен
Тора, хужу сюльда. Пельзан и дах чечень.
Памалых сяванжен, нимень сjок чон анчах, —
Парня вырня полдар вулда аппинь санах!

Translation:

We do not know what to give

you beautiful queen, universal mother,

for the love of us. Did not know until now.

Goddess, which is in heaven, It turns out she is very elegant.

We have nothing significant except our souls.

May they be a gift to you!

More than 10 similar Chuvash poems, mostly by unknown authors, have been identified. One of them, written in 1795 and dedicated to Archbishop Ambrose, is usually attributed to Nikita Bichurin (1777–1853). E.I. Rozhanski (1741–1801), one of the founders of the original Chuvash alphabet, also wrote literature in Chuvash. In 1880, he translated the Short Catechism, which was the first book published in the Chuvash language. Another piece of Chuvash literature called "Chvash Aber Boldymyr," perhaps by V.I. Lebedev, dates to the same period (1852).

=== Late 19th century ===
The current Chuvash alphabet (based on the Russian alphabet) was created in the early 1870s by I.Y. Yakovlev, an educator and social activist. During these years, there were works authored in the Chuvash language using this new alphabet. The highest achievement of the Chuvash literature of this period may be a poem by Mikhail Fedorov (1848–1904), titled "Arzuri." It was written in 1884 and spread among the population, but was actually published much later in 1908. During these years, Ignatius Ivanov (1848–1885) also wrote works of literature. He is best known as the author of a series of short stories entitled How to Live Chuvash. Some of his work has been published in the primer by I.Y. Yakovlev, alongside many other works of Chuvash literature.

=== 19th to 20th centuries (1886–1903) ===
The formal starting point of this period is considered to be 1886, when Ivan Yurkin (1863–1943) began his literary career by writing his first short story. Yurkin's major works of literature include "Wealth" and "The Man is Full, But His Eyes Were Hungry." He was also known as a journalist and an active defender of the traditional religion of the Chuvash.

=== Chuvash literature of the 20th century ===
See also Category:Chuvash writers

== Literature ==
- «Чӑваш литературин антологийӗ», составители: Д. В. Гордеев, Ю. А. Силэм. Шупашкар, 2003. ISBN 5-7670-1279-2 .
- Виталий Родионов, «Чӑваш литератури. XVIII—XIX ӗмӗрсем», Чебоксары, 2006. ISBN 5-7670-1463-9.
- Юхма Мишши, "Авалхи чӑвашсем, Чебоксары, 1996.
