= Tsarist bureaucracy =

Administrative system in Russia before 1917

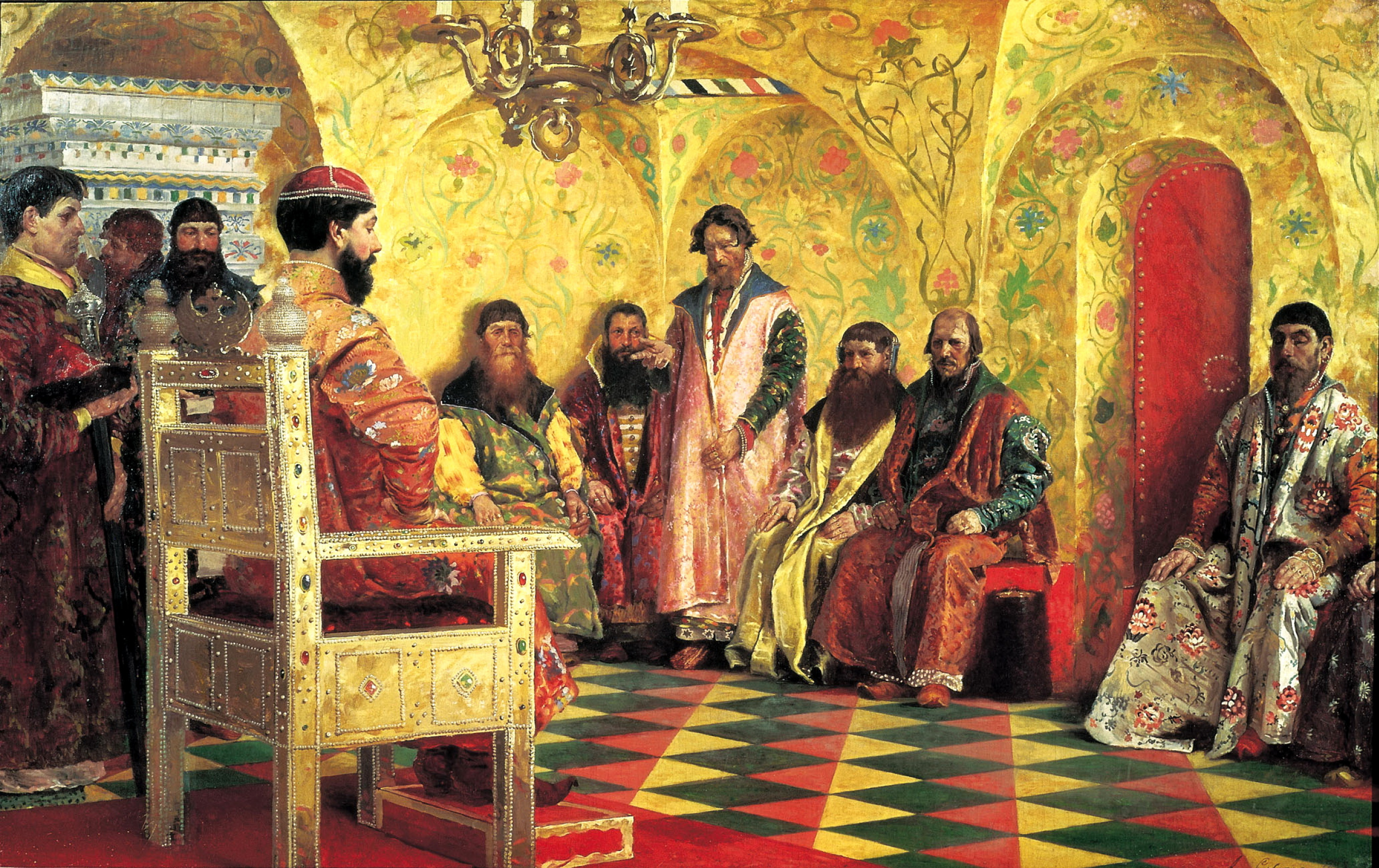
Mikhail Feodorovich at the session of the Boyar Duma (1893)

The Tsarist bureaucracy, alongside the military, the judiciary and the Russian Orthodox Church, played a major role in solidifying and maintaining the rule of the Tsars in the Tsardom of Russia (1547–1721) and in the Russian Empire (1721–1917). In the 19th century, the forces of change brought on by the Industrial Revolution propelled many countries, especially in Europe, to significant social changes. However, due to the conservative nature of the Tsarist regime and its desire to maintain power and control, social change in Russia lagged behind that of Europe.

Russian-speakers referred to bureaucrats as chinovniki (Russian: чиновники) because of the rank or chin (Russian: чин) which they held. Contrary to popular imagination, the Russian Empire was an under-governed country compared to the rest of Europe.

Country	Bureaucrats per 1,000 people in 1900
Russia	4
Britain	7.3
Germany	12.6
France	17.6

In 1718 Tsar Peter the Great investigated why the ex-Swedish province of Livonia was so orderly. He discovered that the Swedes had spent as much on administering Livonia (300 times smaller than his own realm) as he spent on the entire Russian bureaucracy. He was forced to dismantle the province's government.

Peter tried to pay his officials in money instead of letting them live off the land (a practice banned in 1714) and by bribery. In practice he only paid the Moscow and St Petersburg officials and in 1723 he used a quarter of the administration budget to pay off the deficit. Overall, Peter spent less than 4% of the Russian budget on administration.

In 1722 Peter introduced the system of the Table of Ranks, a list of 14 ranks for the court, military and civil services. He intended to make the government meritocratic, but the system soon became corrupted.

Catherine II (later known as Catherine the Great) bought the support of the bureaucracy for her seizure of power (1762). From 19 April 1764, any bureaucrat who had held the same rank for seven years or more got instantly promoted. On 13 September 1767 Catherine decreed that after seven years in one rank, civil servants would automatically receive promotion—regardless of office or merit.

Catherine changed the ecclesiastic provinces so they matched the administrative boundaries, thus increasing the bureaucracy's control over the church.

Originally, achieving rank eight brought hereditary nobility. This was changed to rank five in 1845, and to rank four after 1856. The changes aimed to stop the dilution of the existing nobility with new careerists.
