= Yuri Ofrosimov =

Yuri Viktorovich Ofrosimov (Russian: Юрий Викторович Офросимов; 1894–1967) was a Russian poet and theater critic. He was born in Moscow and emigrated to Berlin in 1920, where he was active in the Russian emigre literary community, including the Berlin Poets' Club. In 1933, Ofrosimov moved to Belgrade; during World War II, he was arrested by German forces. After the war, he lived with his wife Dorothea Vogels in Ennenda, Switzerland.

Some of Ofrosimov's writings are published under the name George Rosimov.

== Writings ==
- 1921. Stikhi ob uteriannom. Berlin : Izd-vo I.P. Ladyzhnikova.
- 1926. Teatr: fel'etony. Berlin : Volga.
