= Ivan Bardin =

Soviet metallurgist (1883–1960)

Ivan Pavlovich Bardin (Russian: Иван Павлович Бардин; 1883–1960) was a Soviet metallurgist and active participant in solving the main engineering issues of the domestic ferrous metallurgical industry. He was also an Academician of USSR AS (1932), vice-president of USSR AS (from 1942), Hero of Socialist Labor (1945), and winner of the Lenin (1958) and State prizes (1942, 1949). His scientific interests were designing new powerful completely mechanized steel works; creating advanced typical metallurgical aggregates; intensifying metallurgical processes, especially by means of oxygen; elaborating and introducing the basic oxygen process; and assimilation and multi-purpose utilization of new kinds of metallurgical raw materials.

== Career ==
He was chair of economics and management (1943–1959) of the Moscow Institute of Steel and Alloys (Moscow, Russia)(MISIS).

Since 1910 after graduation from the Kiev Polytechnic Institute he worked at the steel works of the Russia South (Yuzovka, Yenakiyevo) and in the US. In 1929—1936 I. P. Bardin was one of the construction managers of the Kuznetsk integrated iron-and-steel works (Novokuznetsk Iron and Steel Plant). Since 1937 he held leading positions in ferrous metallurgy (engineer in chief of the central directorate, chairman of the Technical Council of the People's Commissariat, deputy People's Commissar (minister) for ferrous metallurgy. From 1939 he was director of the Institute of Metallurgy of the USSR AS and since 1944 director of the Central research institute of ferrous metallurgy that has borne his name since 1960. Since 1942 he was made vice-president of USSR AS and from 1937 a Delegate of the USSR Supreme Soviet of the 1st-5th convocations.

== Awards ==
Lenin Prize:

- 1958 - for the works for creating first industrial plants for continuous steel casting. Awarded with 7 orders of Lenin and medals.
