= Ha-Yom =

- Type: Daily newspaper
- Editor: Jehuda Löb Kantor
- Founded: 1886
- Ceased publication: 1888
- Language: Hebrew
- Circulation: 2,400 (1886)

Ha-Yom (Hebrew: היום, "The Day") was a Hebrew-language newspaper published from 1886 to mid-1888 from Saint Petersburg, Russia. It was founded and edited by Jehuda Löb Kantor. Ha-Yom was the first daily Hebrew newspaper. When it was launched Ha-Yom had a daily circulation of around 2,400. By 1887 the number of subscribers had fallen to around 1,600.

Ha-Yom was characterized by a modern, Europeanized form of journalism, previously unknown in the Hebrew-language press. It was the first Hebrew-language newspaper to rely on telegraphic news agency material for its coverage. Moreover, Kantor contracted correspondents in Jewish centres in Western Europe and the United States. Prominent contributors to Ha-Yom included D. Frischman, A. Rosenfeld and L. Katzenelson.

The launching and initial success of Ha-Yom provoked the existing Hebrew-language publications Ha-Meliz and Ha-Tsefirah to convert themselves into daily newspapers. Competition with Aleksander Zederbaum's Ha-Meliz became fierce. Prior to the founding of Ha-Yom, Ha-Meliz had monopolized the Jewish press in the Russia. The fact that Ha-Yom subscribed to the "Northern Company" telegraphic news agency forced Ha-Meliz to do the same. The subscription costs (3,000 rubles per year) became a heavy economic burden for both publications.

At an early stage Ha-Yom became the newspaper of choice of many followers of the Lovers of Zion movement. However, Ha-Meliz was able to convince a large portion of them to shift their subscriptions back to Ha-Meliz, thus significantly undercutting the popularity of Ha-Yom.

In 1887 the literary Ben-Ami ("Son of my people") was introduced as a monthly supplement to Ha-Yom. Four issues of Ben-Ami were published.

The last few editions of Ha-Yom were edited by J. L. Gordon. After Ha-Yom was closed down, Kantor became the editor of Ha-Meliz in 1889.
