= Sofiya Pregel =

Russian poet (1894–1972)

Sofiya Yulievna Pregel (Russian: София Юльевна Прегель; 1894–1972) was a Russian-born poet. She emigrated to Berlin in 1922 and then to Paris in 1932, where she directed the Rifma publishing house.

== Writings ==
- 1935. Razgovor s pamiat'iu. Paris: Chisla.
- 1937. Solnechnyi proizvol. Paris: Sovremennyie zapiski.
