= Eduard Brandt =

Russo-German comparative anatomist and zoologist

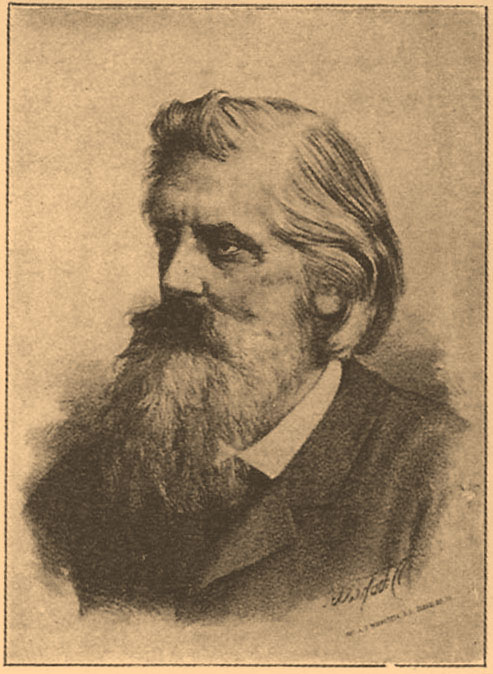
Eduard Brandt

Eduard Karlovich Brandt (Russian: Эдуард Карлович Брандт; 15 February 1839 – 17 November 1891) was a Russo-German comparative anatomist and zoologist who contributed to studies on the nervous system of insects. He served as a professor at the Imperial Military Medical Academy in St. Petersburg.

== Life and work ==
Brandt was educated at St. Petersburg where he studied at the Saint Peter's School after which he studied medicine, receiving a diploma in 1862. He then studied zoology, training under his uncle Fedor Fedorovich Brandt (German form Johann Friedrich von Brandt), particularly examining the insects and received a master's degree in 1876. In 1863 he became an assistant in comparative anatomy at the Imperial Military Medical Academy. He made field trips in Paris with Émile Blanchard and Henri Milne-Edwards in 1866 and met Richard Owen in London. He became a professor of zoology in 1878 and was elected to the Academy of Sciences Leopoldina in 1881. His major work was on the nervous system of insects for which he received an award from the French Academy of Sciences. Between 1880 and 1889 he presided over the Russian Entomological Society.

== Sources ==
- "Брандт, Эдуард Карлович" . Brockhaus and Efron Encyclopedic Dictionary (in Russian). 1906.
