= Aleksandr Kasyanov (composer) =

Russian composer

Aleksandr Kasyanov Александр Касьянов
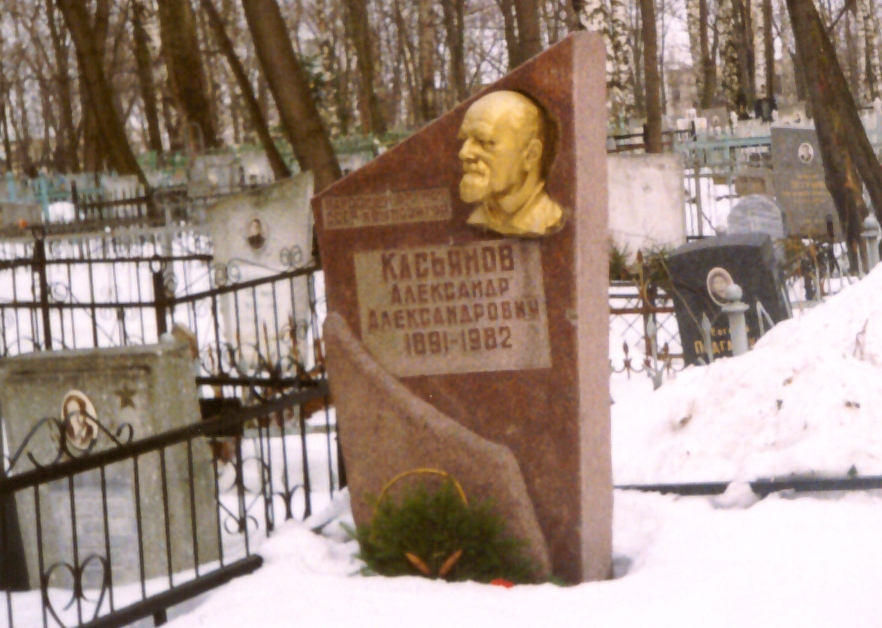

Background information
- Born: 29 August 1891 [O.S. 17 August] Bolobonovo, Simbirsk Governorate, Russian Empire
- Died: 13 February 1982 (aged 90) Gorky, Russian SFSR, Soviet Union (present-day Nizhny Novgorod)
- Genre: Classical
- Occupations: Composer; Conductor; Pianist; Teacher
- Instrument: Piano

Aleksandr Aleksandrovich Kasyanov (Note: Russian: Александр Александрович Касьянов, romanized: Aleksandr Aleksandrovich Kasyanov) (29 August 1891 [O.S. 17 August] – 13 February 1982) was a Soviet and Russian composer, conductor, pianist and professor. He studied privately in his youth with Mily Balakirev and Alexander Glazunov before pursuing studies at the Petrograd Conservatory from which he graduated. At that conservatory he studied under Nikolay Sokolov (music composition) and Sergei Lyapunov (piano).

From 1918 until his death in 1982 Kasyanov lived in Nizhniy Novgorod (also known as Gorky). He worked as a conductor of opera and theatre music and also taught at the conservatory in Nizhniy Novgorod. He received the Order of Lenin in 1967, Order of the October Revolution in 1981, and People's Artist of the USSR in 1971.

== Works ==
- Iola «Иола» (1923),
- Stepan Razin, «Степан Разин» (1939) on the Cossack Stepan Razin revised 1953, 3rd revision 1977 given at the Bolshoi
- Partizantka «Партизанка» (1941)
- Foma Gordeyev «Фома Гордеев» (1946) revised 1966 Kromlyovsky Theatre
- In the Far North «На дальнем Севере» (1947),
- Yermak «Ермак» (1957) on the Cossack Yermak Timofeyevich
