= 1990 in the Soviet Union =

- Decades: 1970s; 1980s; 1990s
- See also: History of the Soviet Union; List of years in the Soviet Union

The following lists events that happened during 1990 in the Union of Soviet Socialist Republics.

== Incumbents ==
- President of the Soviet Union – Mikhail Gorbachev
- General Secretary of the Communist Party of the Soviet Union – Mikhail Gorbachev
- Chairman of the Supreme Soviet – Mikhail Gorbachev (until 15 March), Anatoly Lukyanov (after 15 March)
- Vice President of the Soviet Union – Gennady Yanayev
- Premier of the Soviet Union – Nikolai Ryzhkov

== Events ==
=== January ===
- January 12 – Baku pogrom
- January 19–20 – Black January

=== March ===
- March 4 – 1990 Russian Supreme Soviet election
- March 11 – Act of the Re-Establishment of the State of Lithuania

=== May ===
- May 4 – Declaration "On the Restoration of Independence of the Republic of Latvia"
- May 6 – Bridge of Flowers
- May 9 – 1990 Moscow Victory Day Parade
- May 16 – Congress of People's Deputies of Russia is established
- May 30–31 – 1990 Vrancea earthquakes

=== June ===
- June 1 – 1990 Chemical Weapons Accord
- June 4–6 – Osh riots
- June 7–8 – 1990 Local Council of the Russian Orthodox Church
- June 12 – Declaration of State Sovereignty of the Russian Soviet Federative Socialist Republic
- June 19 – Communist Party of the Russian Soviet Federative Socialist Republic is established

=== July ===
- Unknown date – Gazprombank was founded.
- July 14 – The 28th Politburo of the Communist Party of the Soviet Union is elected
- July 14 – Central Committee elected by the 28th Congress of the Communist Party of the Soviet Union
- July 16 – Declaration of State Sovereignty of Ukraine
- July 27 – Declaration of State Sovereignty of the Belarusian Soviet Socialist Republic

=== August ===
- August 10 – Tbilisi–Agdam bus bombing
- August 30 – The 500 Days program is established

=== October ===
- October 11 – Declaration of State Sovereignty of Bashkortostan
- October 17 – VTB Bank was founded.
- October 24 – Soviet nuclear tests
- October 27 – Askar Akayev is elected as the 1st President of Kyrgyzstan
- October 27 – The first episode of Pole Chudes is presented

=== November ===
November 7 – The Last Parade of The October Revolution takes on Moscow's Red Square on 73th Anniversary of the Bolsheviks Seizure of Power

== Births ==
- August 23 — Anton Tikhomirov, Russian professional ice hockey player
- September 19 — Evgeny Novikov, Russian rally driver

== Deaths ==
=== January ===
- January 2 — Leonhard Merzin, Estonian actor (b. 1934)
- January 4 — Boris Nikolsky, physical chemist and radiochemist (b. 1900)
- January 5 — Genrikh Sidorenkov, ice hockey player (b. 1931)
- January 6 — Pavel Cherenkov, physicist (b. 1904)
- January 19
  - Alexander Pechersky, soldier and humanitarian (b. 1909)
  - Movses Gorgisyan, Armenian activist and politician (b. 1961)
  - Maharram Seyidov, Azerbaijani soldier (b. 1952)
- January 26 — Dodo Abashidze, actor and film director (b. 1924)
- January 30 — Nina Niss-Goldman, painter, sculptor and teacher (b. 1892)

=== February ===
- February 2 — Paul Ariste, linguist (b. 1905)
- February 16 — Volodymyr Shcherbytsky, 14th First Secretary of the Communist Party of Ukraine (b. 1918)
- February 22 — Evald Seepere, Estonian boxer (b. 1911)
- February 23 — David Samoylov, poet (b. 1920)

=== March ===
- March 4
  - Konstantin Kokkinaki, fighter and test pilot (b. 1910)
  - Vasily Margelov, general (b. 1908)
- March 7 — Shenork I Kaloustian of Constantinople, 82th Armenian Patriarch of Constantinople (b. 1913)
- March 9 — George Costakis, collector of Russian art (b. 1913)
- March 14 — Yuri Sokolov, Soviet Olympic judoka (1988) and criminal (b. 1961)
- March 15 — Mykola Makhynia, football player and coach (b. 1912)
- March 20 — Lev Yashin, footballer (b. 1929)
- March 30 — Vladimir Stolnikov, boxer (b. 1934)

=== April ===
- April 4
  - Leonid Dushkin, rocket engineer (b. 1910)
  - Mark Fradkin, composer (b. 1914)
- April 5 — Lev Skvirsky, lieutenant-general (b. 1903)
- April 6 — Yevgeny Savitsky, fighter ace and air marshal (b. 1910)
- April 19 — Sergey Filippov, actor and comedian (b. 1912)
- April 24
  - Endel Pärn, actor and singer (b. 1914)
  - Vladimir Saprykin, Red Army officer and war hero (b. 1916)
- April 27 — Vladimir Kanygin, middleweight weightlifter (b. 1948)
- April 30
  - Vasili Yermasov, football goalkeeper and manager (b. 1913)
  - Mark Zborowski, anthropologist and spy (b. 1908)

=== May ===
- May 3 — Pimen I of Moscow, 14th Patriarch of Moscow and all Rus' (b. 1910)
- May 11 — Venedikt Yerofeyev, writer and dissident (b. 1938)
- May 12 — Andrei Kirilenko, politician (b. 1906)
- May 15
  - Porfiry Krylov, painter and graphic artist (b. 1902)
  - Anna Schchian, botanist (b. 1905)
- May 24 — Julijans Vaivods, Roman Catholic cardinal (b. 1895)
- May 26 — Varlen Pen, painter (b. 1916)
- May 28 — Inna Gulaya, actress (b. 1940)

=== June ===
- June 1 — Natalia Tkachenko, painter (b. 1908)
- June 4 — Yulian Bromley, anthropologist (b. 1921)
- June 5 — Vasili Kuznetsov, politician (b. 1901)
- June 6
  - Sobir Kamolov, 10th First Secretary of the Communist Party of Uzbek SSR (b. 1910)
  - Fyodor Remezov, general (b. 1896)
- June 11 — Irakly Andronikov, literature historian and media personality (b. 1908)
- June 14 — Ralf Liivar, Estonian football player (b. 1903)
- June 17 — Aleksandrs Leimanis, film director (b. 1913)
- June 19 — Aleksandr Goncharov, field hockey player and Olympian (b. 1959)
- June 22
  - Marat Podoksin, painter (b. 1930)
  - Ilya Frank, nuclear physicist (b. 1908)
- June 25 — Yevgeniya Sechenova, sprinter (b. 1918)
- June 28 — Borys Ivchenko, Ukrainian actor and film director (b. 1941)

=== July ===
- July 1 – Ivan Serov, 1st Chairman of the Committee for State Security (b. 1905)
- July 4 — Pavel Utkin, painter (b. 1920)
- July 10 – Sergei Rudenko, general (b. 1904)
- July 12 – Savkuz Dzarasov, wrestler and Olympic medalist (b. 1930)
- July 15
  - Oleg Kagan, violinist (b. 1946)
  - Enn Roos, sculptor (b. 1908)
- July 16
  - Mikhail Matusovsky, poet (b. 1915)
  - Valentin Pikul, novelist (b. 1928)
- July 17 – Lidiya Ginzburg, literary critic (b. 1902)
- July 19
  - Georgi Burkov, actor (b. 1933)
  - Gusman Kosanov, Olympic sprinter (b. 1935)
- July 20 – Sergei Parajanov, filmmaker (b. 1924)
- July 22 – Eduard Streltsov, footballer (b. 1937)

=== August ===
- August 2 — Vladilen Nikiforov, Soviet painter (b. 1930)
- August 6 — Baqi Urmançe, painter, sculptor, and graphic artist (b. 1897)
- August 15 — Viktor Tsoi, singer and songwriter (b. 1962)
- August 22 – Boris Shcherbina, politician (b. 1919)
- August 24 – Sergei Dovlatov, journalist and writer (b. 1941)
- August 29 – Solomon Mikhlin, mathematician (b. 1908)
- August 30 — Timofey Ksenofontov, Soviet painter
- August 31 – Sergey Volkov, figure skater and Olympian (b. 1949)

=== September ===
- September 1 – Afanasy Beloborodov, general (b. 1903)
- September 3
  - Slava Amiragov, Olympic rower (b. 1926)
  - Eugene Martynov, singer (b. 1948)
- September 8 – Boris Tenin, actor (b. 1905)
- September 9
  - Alexander Men, theologian (b. 1935)
  - Anatoly Sofronov, author and poet (b. 1911)
  - Rimantas Stankevičius, cosmonaut and pilot (b. 1944)
- September 14 – Leonid Ivanov, footballer (b. 1921)
- September 15 – Valentin Filatyev, Soviet cosmonaut (b. 1930)
- September 16 – Semyon Kurkotkin, general (b. 1917)
- September 21 – Alexander Konstantinopolsky, chess player (b. 1910)
- September 27 – Matvey Blanter, composer "Katyusha" (b. 1903)

=== October ===
- October 4 – Sergey Lapin, diplomat (b. 1912)
- October 9 – Boris Paichadze, footballer (b. 1915)
- October 14 – Irina Odoyevtseva, poet, novelist and memoirist (b. 1895)
- October 15 – Boris Piotrovsky, archaeologist (b. 1908)
- October 18 – Pyotr Fedoseyev, philosopher and politician (b. 1908)
- October 20 – Yevgeniya Dolinyuk, kolkhoznik, politician and writer (b. 1914)
- October 22 – Nikolai Rybnikov, film actor (b. 1930)
- October 24 — Boris Maluev, Soviet painter and graphic artist (b. 1929)
- October 25 – Zara Mints, literary scientist (b. 1927)
- October 28
  - Aleksandra Chudina, track and field athlete and volleyball player (b. 1923)
  - Kolau Nadiradze, poet (b. 1895)
- October 29 – Aleksey Alelyukhin, flying ace (b. 1920)

=== November ===
- November 3 – Nikolai Rakov, violinist (b. 1908)
- November 5 – Suleiman Yudakov, composer (b. 1916)
- November 7 — Stepan Privedentsev, painter (b. 1916)
- November 14 – Leonid Trauberg, film director and screenwriter (b. 1902)
- November 16 – Dmitri Skobeltsyn, physicist (b. 1892)
- November 19 – Georgy Flyorov, Soviet nuclear physicist (b. 1913)
- November 25 – Merab Mamardashvili, philosopher (b. 1930)

=== December ===
- December 1 – Anton Kochinyan, 11th First Secretary of the Communist Party of Armenia (b. 1913)
- December 3 – Heino Mandri, film and stage actor (b. 1922)
- December 8 – Boris Kochno, dancer, librettist and poet (b. 1904)
- December 15 – Mikayil Jabrayilov, Azerbaijani soldier (b. 1952)
- December 21 – Ivan Knunyants, chemist (b. 1906)
- December 25
  - Vladimir Belousov, geologist (b. 1907)
  - Alexander Luchinsky, general (b. 1900)
- December 27 – Abulfat Aliyev, opera singer (b. 1926)
- December 31 – Vasily Lazarev, cosmonaut (b. 1928)

== See also ==
- 1990 in fine arts of the Soviet Union
- List of Soviet films of 1980-91
