= 1913 in Russia =

- Decades: 1890s; 1900s; 1910s; 1920s; 1930s
- See also: History of Russia; Timeline of Russian history; List of years in Russia

Events from the year 1913 in Russia.

== Incumbents ==
- Monarch – Nicholas II
- Chairman of the Council of Ministers – Vladimir Nikolayevich Kokovtsov

== Events ==
- January – Joseph Stalin (whose first article using his name is published this month) travels to Vienna to carry out research. Until he leaves on February 16 the city is home simultaneously to him, Adolf Hitler, Leon Trotsky, and Josip Broz Tito, alongside Alban Berg, Sigmund Freud, Ludwig and Paul Wittgenstein, and Carl Jung.
- February – 300th anniversary of the Romanov dynasty.
- Brusilov Expedition
- Baymak
- Benliahmet Railway Station
- Bilozerske
- Cuvânt Moldovenesc (magazine)
- DLT (department store)
- Glasul Basarabiei
- Hotel Polonia Palace
- Insignia of Saint Olga
- Ismailiyya building
- Kharkiv Choral Synagogue
- Kiev Conservatory
- Kronstadt Naval Cathedral
- Mykolaiv Regional Museum of Local History
- Qazaq
- Saint Petersburg Mosque
- Sarıkamış railway station
- Selim railway station
- Shakhmaty v SSSR
- Sochi railway station
- Soğanlı Railway Station
- Spaso House
- Tallinn Power Plant
- Di Tsayt (Saint Petersburg)
- Vilnis
- Vinnytsia Tramway

== Births ==
- January 15 - Alexander Marinesko, Soviet naval officer and submarine commander during World War II. (d. 1963)
- January 27 -Valery Zhelobinsky, Russian pianist and composer. (d. 1946)
- November 7 - Tahira Tahirova, Azerbaijani politician (d. 1991)
- December 6 - Nikolai Amosov, Soviet and Ukrainian heart surgeon, inventor, and author. (d. 2002)

== Deaths ==
- April 24 – Vsevolod Abramovich, aviator (b. 1890)
- May 6 – Elena Guro, painter and writer (b. 1877)
- June 1 – Iosif Dubrovinsky, Bolshevik and comrade of Vladimir Lenin prior to the Russian Revolution (b. 1877)
- July 20 – Vsevolod Rudnev, admiral (b. 1855)
- August 11 – Vasily Avseenko, journalist and writer (b. 1842)
- August 28 – Fyodor Kamensky, sculptor (b. 1836)
- October 20 – Viktor Kirpichov, engineer and physicist (b. 1845)
- November 30 – Alexandra Albedinskaya, courtier (b. 1834)
