= 1834 in Russia =

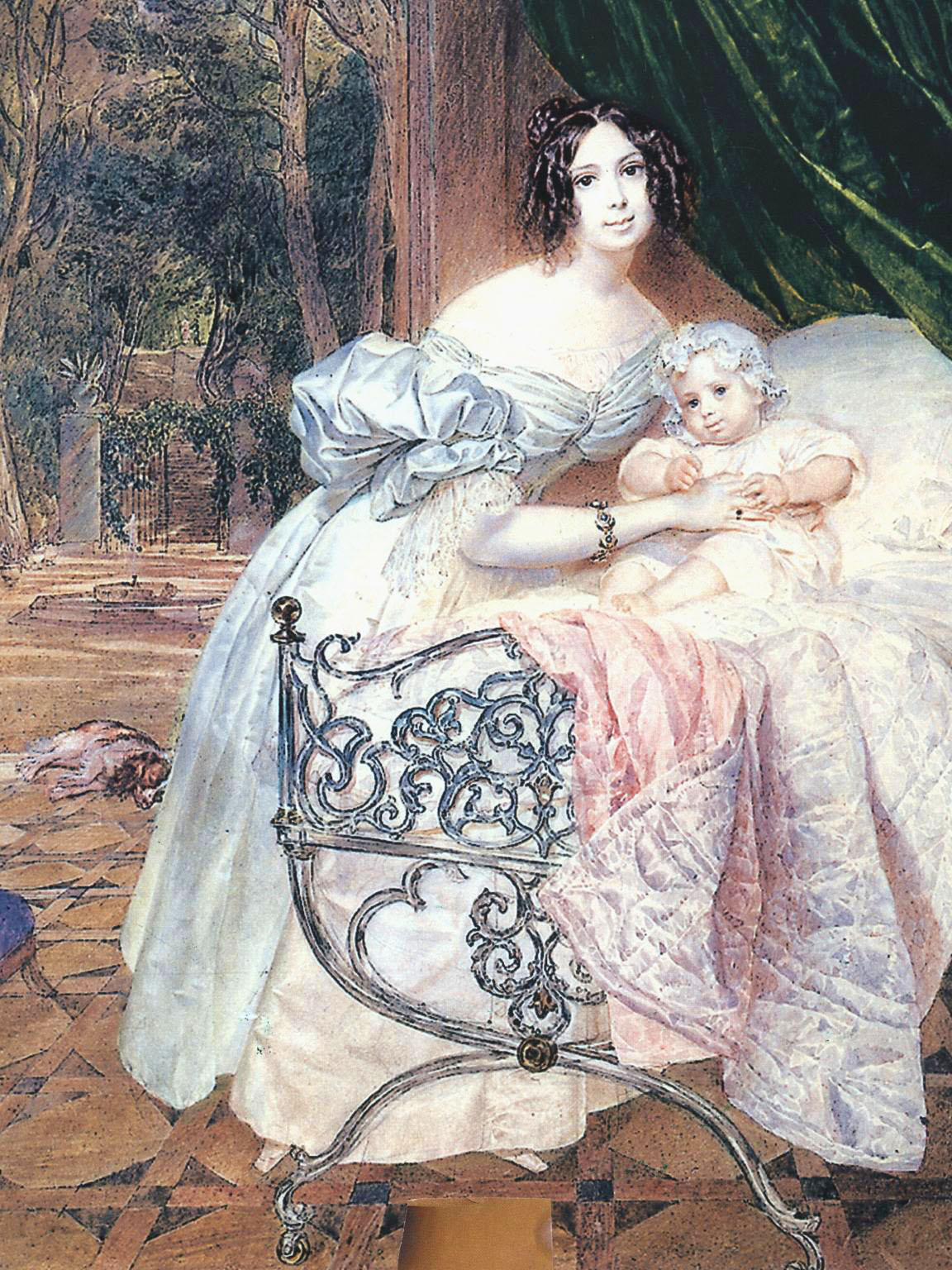
Maria Chreptowicz by Briullov

List of events and peoples from the year 1834 in Russia.

== Incumbents ==
- Monarch – Nicholas I
- Imam of Dagestan – Imam Shamil
- Baron – Grigory Zass
- Imam of Dagestan – Hamzat Bek

== Events ==
- Russian conquest of Chechnya and Dagestan
- Circassian genocide
- Russo–Circassian War
- Battle of Abinsk
- Treaty of Saint Petersburg (1834)
- Biblioteka Dlya Chteniya
- Central Moscow Hippodrome
- Fort Stikine
- National Pedagogical Dragomanov University
- Sev Berd
- Taras Shevchenko National University of Kyiv
- Warsaw Citadel

== Births ==
- Maria Golitzyna, noble, courtier and philanthropist (d. 1910)
- Elizabeth Trubetskaya, courtier (d. 1907)
- Alexandra Albedinskaya, courtier (d. 1913)

== Deaths ==
- Hamzat Bek
