= 1914 in Russia =

- Decades: 1890s; 1900s; 1910s; 1920s; 1930s
- See also: History of Russia; Timeline of Russian history; List of years in Russia

Events from the year 1914 in Russia.

== Incumbents ==
- Monarch – Nicholas II
- Chairman of the Council of Ministers – Vladimir Kokovtsov (until 12 February), Ivan Goremykin (starting 12 February)

== Events ==
- 8 April–9 May - St. Petersburg 1914 chess tournament
- 10 May - opening of Yevpatoria tram
- 29 June - world's first high-speed long-range flight of a heavy aircraft Ilya Muromets started, on the route Saint Petersburg - Orsha - Kopys - Kiev - Saint Petersburg
- 8 July - Government suppression of striking oil workers in Baku triggers a short but intensive wave of strikes in St Petersburg, lasting almost a week.
- 28 July - Austria-Hungary declares war on Serbia. World War I begins
- 29 July - In connection with the difficult international situation, Russia begins mobilization in the areas bordering Austria-Hungary. General mobilization is announced the next day. Emperor Nicholas II of Russia sent a telegram to Germany's Kaiser Wilhelm II with a proposal to "transfer the Austria/Serbia question to the Hague Conference." The Kaiser did not reply to this telegram.
- 30 July - Prince Georgy Lvov creates the All-Russian Zemstvo Union for the Relief of Sick and Wounded Soldiers.
- 1 August - German Empire declares war on Russia
- 6 August - Austria-Hungary declares war on Russia
- 10 August - Austria-Hungary invades Russia
- 17 August - The Battle of Tannenberg ends
- 18 August - St Petersburg is renamed Petrograd
- 26–30 August - Battle of Tannenberg: German victory
- 29 August - Abschwangen massacre
- 31 August - Emperor Nicholas II renamed St. Petersburg to Petrograd as a response to the rise of anti-German sentiment.
- 1 September - The Battle of the Masurian Lakes ends
- 3 September - the Southern Russian Army captured Lemberg, the capital of Galacia
- 9 September - Allied forces halt German advance into France during First Battle of the Marne.
- 22 October - The five Bolshevik deputies in the Duma are arrested. They are put on trial in February 1915 and all are sentenced to exile in Siberia.
- 1 November - Russia declares war on Ottoman Turkey
- 25 December - Battle of Ardahan begins

== Births ==
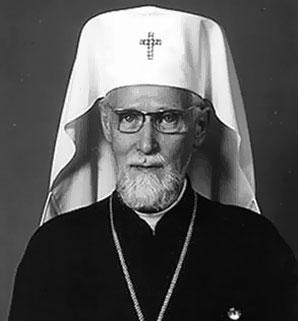
Paul

- March 6 – Kirill Kondrashin, Russian conductor (d. 1981)
- March 16 – Arkady Chernyshev, Russian ice hockey player and coach (d. 1992)
- 15 June - Yuri Andropov, General Secretary of the CPSU (1982–84), Chairman of the KGB (1967–82) (d. 1984)
- 23 August - Lev Ozerov, translator
- August 28 – Paul, Finnish Orthodox archbishop (d. 1988)
- 2 October - Yuri Levitan, radio announcer
- 24 December – Zoya Bulgakova, actress (d. 2017)

== Deaths ==
- January 3 – Nadezhda Rykalova, actress (born 1824)
- 8 September - Pyotr Nesterov, pilot and aircraft designer
