= 1907 in Russia =

- Decades: 1880s; 1890s; 1900s; 1910s; 1920s
- See also: History of Russia; Timeline of Russian history; List of years in Russia

Events from the year 1907 in Russia.

== Incumbents ==
- Monarch – Nicholas II
- Chairman of the Council of Ministers – Pyotr Arkadyevich Stolypin

== Events ==
- Sovremennaya Rech, a liberal bourgeois daily newspaper, publishes from January to May, 1907.
- Coup of June 1907, a coup d'état against the State Duma.

== Births ==
- January 21 - Jānis Mendriks, Latvian Catholic priest (d. 1953)
- June 30 - Khalimakhon Suleymanova, Tajik farmer (d. 1993)
- August 1 - Shmavon Mangasarov, Soviet artist of Armenian ethnicity
- October 27 - Semyon Mandel, Soviet/Russian theatre and film production designer and art director (d. 1974)
- December 7 - Fred Rose, Canadian politician and trade union organizer (d. 1983)
- December 11 - Viktoria Brezhneva, First Lady of the Soviet Union (d. 1995)

=== Full date missing ===
- Hans-Wilhelm Scheidt, German Reichsamtsleiter of the NSDAP, the German Nazi Party (d. 1981).

== Deaths ==
- Konstantin Pobedonostsev, jurist and statesman (b. 1827)
- Dmitri Mendeleev, chemist and inventor (b. 1834)
- Elizabeth Trubetskaya, courtier (b. 1834)
- Pavel Ivanovich Blaramberg, composer and journalist (b. 1841)
