= Vilnis =

Vilnis (literary: wave) is the name of several Latvian and Lithuanian-language newspapers:

- Vilnis (Riga newspaper), Bolshevik newspaper published from Riga in 1913–1914
- Vilnis (Chicago newspaper), communist newspaper published from Chicago in 1920–1989
- Vilnis (Molėtai newspaper), regional newspaper published from Molėtai since 1951

See also

- Vilnis (given name)
