= 1911 in Russia =

- Decades: 1890s; 1900s; 1910s; 1920s; 1930s
- See also: History of Russia; Timeline of Russian history; List of years in Russia

Events from the year 1911 in Russia.

== Incumbents ==
- Monarch – Nicholas II
- Chairman of the Council of Ministers – Pyotr Stolypin (until 18 September), Vladimir Kokovtsov (starting 22 September)
- Chairman of the State Council – Mikhail Akimov
- Chairman of the State Duma – Alexander Guchkov (until 28 March), Mikhail Rodzianko (starting 23 March)
- Deputy Chairman of the State Duma – Mikhail Kapustin

== Events ==
- 3 January - 1911 Kebin earthquake: An earthquake of 7.7 moment magnitude strikes near Almaty in Russian Turkestan, killing 450 or more people.
- 18 February - an earthquake in Pamir Mountains blocking the Murghab River by a landslide led to the formation of Sarez Lake
- 20 February - Bologoye cinema fire, 64 dead, most of them (43) are children
- In March, the Western Zemstvo crisis was set off when Stolypin's bill to establish zemstvos in the Western gubernias was voted down in the State Council. Stolypin threatened to resign unless the Tsar prorogued the Duma and passed the bill by emergency decree under Article 87 of Russia's Fundamental Laws, to which the Tsar agreed, alienating almost everyone. This bill was introduced to help realise Stolypin's nationalist agenda for a "Great Russia" by promoting Russian political and cultural hegemony in the western provinces of the empire.
- 25 March - murder of Andrei Yushchinsky, a student of the preparatory class of the Kiev Sophia religious school. The authorities (including the Minister of Justice) put pressure on the investigation and contributed to the adoption of a religious-ritual version of the murder. The Jew Mendel Beilis was accused of the crime, but the jury acquitted him. The murder investigation and the ensuing trial, known as the "Beilis case", were widely covered in the Russian and world press.
- 7 July - North Pacific Fur Seal Convention of 1911\
- 27 August - CSKA Moscow, a professional multi-sports club is officially founded.
- 14 September - Prime Minister of Russia Pyotr Stolypin assassinated by Dmitry Bogrov in Kiev Opera House.
- 29 October–23 November - Russian Invasion of Tabriz, 1911
- 7 December - Qiqihar Protocol between Russia and China on border demarcation in the Argun River area
- Gleb Kotelnikov invented the knapsack parachute
- Air Intelligence branch of Russia's Airforce is created.

== Births ==
- 2 January - Pavel Rychagov, Soviet air ace, air force general (d. 1941)
- 22 May - Anatol Rapoport, Russian-born American mathematical psychologist (d. 2007)
- 23 June - Nikolai Kuznetsov, aeronautical engineer (d. 1995)
- 1 July - Sergey Sokolov, minister of Defence of the USSR (d. 2012)
- 9 July - Aleksandrs Laime, Latvian-born Venezuelan explorer (d. 1994)
- 17 August - Mikhail Botvinnik, 6th World Chess Champion
- 8 October - Mark Bernes, singer and actor
- 24 September - Konstantin Chernenko, Leader of the Soviet Union from 1984 to 1985
- 24 October - Arkady Raikin, stand-up comedian

== Deaths ==
- 15 February - Pavel Grigorievich Dukmasov, general (b. 1838)
- 27 March - Margarita Savitskaya, actress (b. 1868)
- 28 March - Mikalojus Čiurlionis, painter and composer of Lithuanian origin
- 25 May - Vasily Klyuchevsky, historian (b. 1841)
- 7 September - Friedrich Breitfuss, philatelist (b. 1851)
- 18 September - Pyotr Stolypin, Prime Minister and Minister of the Interior of the Russian Empire
- 1 December - Vassily Maximov, painter (b. 1844)
- 5 December - Valentin Serov, painter
- 13 December - Nikolay Beketov, physical chemist
