= Breitfuss =

Breitfuss, or Breitfuß is a surname.

== As a surname ==
- Friedrich Breitfuss (1851–1911), Russian philatelist
- Leonid Breitfuss, German polar explorer for whom Breitfuss Glacier is named

== As a given name ==
- Simon Breitfuss Kammerlander, Bolivian-Austrian ski racer
