= Soğanlı =

Soğanlı may refer to the following places in Turkey:

- Soğanlı, Ardanuç
- Soğanlı, Burdur
- Soğanlı, Kovancılar
- Soğanlı, Sason
- Soğanlı, Sur
- Soğanlı railway station
- Soğanlı Valley
