= 1988 Soviet nuclear tests =

1988

Information
- Country: Soviet Union
- Test site: Arkhangelsk, Russia; Balapan, Semipalatinsk, Kazakhstan; Degelen, Semipalatinsk, Kazakhstan; NZ Area B, Matochkin Shar, Novaya Zemlya, Russia; Yamalo-Nenets, Russia
- Period: 1988
- Number of tests: 16
- Test type: underground shaft, tunnel
- Max. yield: 150 kilotonnes of TNT (630 TJ)

Test series chronology

The Soviet Union's 1988 nuclear test series was a group of 16 nuclear tests conducted in 1988. These tests (Note: A bomb test may be a salvo test, defined as two or more explosions "where a period of time between successive individual explosions does not exceed 5 seconds and where the burial points of all explosive devices can be connected by segments of straight lines, each of them connecting two burial points and does not exceed 40 kilometers in length". Mikhailov, V. N. "Catalog of World Wide Nuclear Testing". Begell-Atom, LLC. Archived from the original on 2014-04-26.) followed the 1987 Soviet nuclear tests series and preceded the 1989 Soviet nuclear tests series.

Soviet Union's 1988 series tests and detonations
Name (Note: The US, France and Great Britain have code-named their test events, while the USSR and China did not, and therefore have only test numbers (with some exceptions – Soviet peaceful explosions were named). Word translations into English in parentheses unless the name is a proper noun. A dash followed by a number indicates a member of a salvo event. The US also sometimes named the individual explosions in such a salvo test, which results in "name1 – 1(with name2)". If test is canceled or aborted, then the row data like date and location discloses the intended plans, where known.)	Date time (UT)	Local time zone (Note: To convert the UT time into standard local, add the number of hours in parentheses to the UT time; for local daylight saving time, add one additional hour. If the result is earlier than 00:00, add 24 hours and subtract 1 from the day; if it is 24:00 or later, subtract 24 hours and add 1 to the day. Historical time zone data obtained from the IANA time zone database.)	Location (Note: Rough place name and a latitude/longitude reference; for rocket-carried tests, the launch location is specified before the detonation location, if known. Some locations are extremely accurate; others (like airdrops and space blasts) may be quite inaccurate. "~" indicates a likely pro-forma rough location, shared with other tests in that same area.)	Elevation + height (Note: Elevation is the ground level at the point directly below the explosion relative to sea level; height is the additional distance added or subtracted by tower, balloon, shaft, tunnel, air drop or other contrivance. For rocket bursts the ground level is "N/A". In some cases it is not clear if the height is absolute or relative to ground, for example, Plumbbob/John. No number or units indicates the value is unknown, while "0" means zero. Sorting on this column is by elevation and height added together.)	Delivery, (Note: Atmospheric, airdrop, balloon, gun, cruise missile, rocket, surface, tower, and barge are all disallowed by the Partial Nuclear Test Ban Treaty. Sealed shaft and tunnel are underground, and remained useful under the PTBT. Intentional cratering tests are borderline; they occurred under the treaty, were sometimes protested, and generally overlooked if the test was declared to be a peaceful use.) Purpose (Note: Include weapons development, weapon effects, safety test, transport safety test, war, science, joint verification and industrial/peaceful, which may be further broken down.)	Device (Note: Designations for test items where known, "?" indicates some uncertainty about the preceding value, nicknames for particular devices in quotes. This category of information is often not officially disclosed.)	Yield (Note: Estimated energy yield in tons, kilotons, and megatons. A ton of TNT equivalent is defined as 4.184 gigajoules (1 gigacalorie).)	Fallout (Note: Radioactive emission to the atmosphere aside from prompt neutrons, where known. The measured species is only iodine-131 if mentioned, otherwise it is all species. No entry means unknown, probably none if underground and "all" if not; otherwise notation for whether measured on the site only or off the site, where known, and the measured amount of radioactivity released.)	References	Notes
692 - 1	6 February 1988 04:19:09.13	ALMT (6 hrs)	Degelen, Semipalatinsk, Kazakhstan: 168p 49.7664°N 78.0287°E	738 m (2,421 ft) +	tunnel, weapons development		5 kt			
692 - 2	6 February 1988 04:19:09.1	ALMT (6 hrs)	Degelen, Semipalatinsk, Kazakhstan: 168p 49.7664°N 78.0287°E	738 m (2,421 ft) +	tunnel, safety experiment		1000 kg			
692 - 3	6 February 1988 04:19:09.1	ALMT (6 hrs)	Degelen, Semipalatinsk, Kazakhstan: 168p 49.7664°N 78.0287°E	738 m (2,421 ft) +	tunnel, safety experiment		1000 kg			
693 - 1	13 February 1988 03:05:08.28	ALMT (6 hrs)	Balapan, Semipalatinsk, Kazakhstan: 1361 49.93289°N 78.86705°E	330 m (1,080 ft) +	underground shaft, weapons development		125 kt			
693 - 2	13 February 1988 03:05:08.3	ALMT (6 hrs)	Balapan, Semipalatinsk, Kazakhstan: 1361 49.93289°N 78.86705°E	330 m (1,080 ft) +	underground shaft, weapons development		unknown yield			
694	3 April 1988 01:33:08.21	ALMT (6 hrs)	Balapan, Semipalatinsk, Kazakhstan: 1336 49.9076°N 78.90654°E	330 m (1,080 ft) +	underground shaft, weapons development		135 kt			
695	22 April 1988 09:30:09.44	ALMT (6 hrs)	Degelen, Semipalatinsk, Kazakhstan: 704 49.7942°N 78.1°E	629 m (2,064 ft) – 124 m (407 ft)	tunnel, weapon effect		2.3 kt			
696	4 May 1988 00:57:09.15	ALMT (6 hrs)	Balapan, Semipalatinsk, Kazakhstan: 1359 49.94944°N 78.75028°E	330 m (1,080 ft) +	underground shaft, fundamental science		132 kt			
697 - 1	7 May 1988 22:49:58.34	MSK (3 hrs)	NZ Area B, Matochkin Shar, Novaya Zemlya, Russia: A-24 73.314°N 54.553°E	100 m (330 ft) – 300 m (980 ft)	tunnel, weapon effect		80 kt	Venting detected on site, 1.2 kCi (44 TBq)		
697 - 2	7 May 1988 22:49:58.3	MSK (3 hrs)	NZ Area B, Matochkin Shar, Novaya Zemlya, Russia: A-24 73.314°N 54.553°E	100 m (330 ft) +	tunnel, weapon effect		unknown yield			
697 - 3	7 May 1988 22:49:58.3	MSK (3 hrs)	NZ Area B, Matochkin Shar, Novaya Zemlya, Russia: A-24 73.314°N 54.553°E	100 m (330 ft) +	tunnel, weapon effect		unknown yield			
698	14 June 1988 02:27:09.0	ALMT (6 hrs)	Balapan, Semipalatinsk, Kazakhstan: 1421 50.02389°N 78.95924°E	330 m (1,080 ft) +	underground shaft, weapons development		4 kt			
699 Rubin 2 (Ruby)	22 August 1988 16:20:00.1	SVET (5 hrs)	Yamalo-Nenets, Russia: RN-2 66.28°N 78.491°E	– 830 m (2,720 ft)	underground shaft, seismic sounding		15 kt			Seismic probing program.
700 Rubin 1 (Ruby)	6 September 1988 16:19:59.9	MSK (3 hrs)	Arkhangelsk, Russia: RN-1 61.35986°N 48.09263°E	– 800 m (2,600 ft)	underground shaft, seismic sounding		8.5 kt			Seismic probing program.
701 Shaga (Steps)	14 September 1988 04:00:00.0	ALMT (6 hrs)	Balapan, Semipalatinsk, Kazakhstan: 1350 49.87867°N 78.82301°E	330 m (1,080 ft) +	underground shaft, joint verification		150 kt			The Soviet part of the Joint Verification Experiment.
702	18 October 1988 03:40:09.16	ALMT (6 hrs)	Degelen, Semipalatinsk, Kazakhstan: 34 49.7799°N 78.0079°E	733 m (2,405 ft) +	tunnel, weapon effect		6 kt			
703	12 November 1988 03:30:06.27	ALMT (6 hrs)	Balapan, Semipalatinsk, Kazakhstan: 1412 50.0463°N 78.96793°E	330 m (1,080 ft) +	underground shaft, weapons development		15 kt			
704 - 1	23 November 1988 03:57:08.99	ALMT (6 hrs)	Degelen, Semipalatinsk, Kazakhstan: 169/1 49.7726°N 78.0378°E	693 m (2,274 ft) – 204 m (669 ft)	tunnel, weapons development		19 kt			
704 - 2	23 November 1988 03:57:09.0	ALMT (6 hrs)	Degelen, Semipalatinsk, Kazakhstan: 169/1 49.7726°N 78.0378°E	693 m (2,274 ft) +	tunnel, fundamental science		unknown yield			
704 - 3	23 November 1988 03:57:09.0	ALMT (6 hrs)	Degelen, Semipalatinsk, Kazakhstan: 169/1 49.7726°N 78.0378°E	693 m (2,274 ft) +	tunnel, safety experiment		1000 kg			
705 - 1	4 December 1988 05:19:53.3	MSK (3 hrs)	NZ Area B, Matochkin Shar, Novaya Zemlya, Russia: A-27 73.366°N 55.001°E	100 m (330 ft) – 400 m (1,300 ft)	tunnel, weapons development		140 kt			
705 - 2	4 December 1988 05:19:53.3	MSK (3 hrs)	NZ Area B, Matochkin Shar, Novaya Zemlya, Russia: A-27 73.366°N 55.001°E	100 m (330 ft) +	tunnel, weapons development		unknown yield			
705 - 3	4 December 1988 05:19:53.3	MSK (3 hrs)	NZ Area B, Matochkin Shar, Novaya Zemlya, Russia: A-27 73.366°N 55.001°E	100 m (330 ft) +	tunnel, weapons development		unknown yield			
705 - 4	4 December 1988 05:19:53.3	MSK (3 hrs)	NZ Area B, Matochkin Shar, Novaya Zemlya, Russia: A-27 73.366°N 55.001°E	100 m (330 ft) +	tunnel, weapon effect		unknown yield			
705 - 5	4 December 1988 05:19:53.3	MSK (3 hrs)	NZ Area B, Matochkin Shar, Novaya Zemlya, Russia: A-27 73.366°N 55.001°E	100 m (330 ft) +	tunnel, safety experiment		1000 kg			
706 - 1	17 December 1988 04:18:09.24	ALMT (6 hrs)	Balapan, Semipalatinsk, Kazakhstan: 1346 49.881°N 78.92325°E	330 m (1,080 ft) +	underground shaft, weapons development		68 kt			
706 - 2	17 December 1988 04:18:09.2	ALMT (6 hrs)	Balapan, Semipalatinsk, Kazakhstan: 1346 49.881°N 78.92325°E	330 m (1,080 ft) +	underground shaft, weapons development		unknown yield			
707 - 1	28 December 1988 05:28:10.0	ALMT (6 hrs)	Degelen, Semipalatinsk, Kazakhstan: 901p 49.80228°N 78.06551°E	710 m (2,330 ft) +	tunnel, weapons development		200 t			
707 - 2	28 December 1988 05:28:10.0	ALMT (6 hrs)	Degelen, Semipalatinsk, Kazakhstan: 901p 49.80228°N 78.06551°E	710 m (2,330 ft) +	tunnel, weapons development		unknown yield			
