= 1989 Soviet nuclear tests =

1989

Information
- Country: Soviet Union
- Test site: Balapan, Semipalatinsk, Kazakhstan; Degelen, Semipalatinsk, Kazakhstan
- Period: 1989
- Number of tests: 7
- Test type: underground shaft, tunnel
- Max. yield: 118 kilotonnes of TNT (490 TJ)

Test series chronology

The Soviet Union's 1989 nuclear test series was a group of 7 nuclear tests conducted in 1989. These tests (Note: A bomb test may be a salvo test, defined as two or more explosions "where a period of time between successive individual explosions does not exceed 5 seconds and where the burial points of all explosive devices can be connected by segments of straight lines, each of them connecting two burial points and does not exceed 40 kilometers in length". Mikhailov, V. N. (ed.). "Catalog of World Wide Nuclear Testing". Begell-Atom, LLC. Archived from the original on 2014-04-26.) followed the 1988 Soviet nuclear tests series and preceded the 1990 Soviet nuclear tests series.

== Nuclear tests ==
=== 714 ===
Test 714 consisted of three devices with a combined yield of 85 kilotonnes of TNT (360 TJ). This was the last nuclear test at Semipalatinsk.

== List of nuclear tests ==
Soviet Union's 1989 series tests and detonations
Name (Note: The US, France and Great Britain have code-named their test events, while the USSR and China did not, and therefore have only test numbers (with some exceptions – Soviet peaceful explosions were named). Word translations into English in parentheses unless the name is a proper noun. A dash followed by a number indicates a member of a salvo event. The US also sometimes named the individual explosions in such a salvo test, which results in "name1 – 1(with name2)". If test is canceled or aborted, then the row data like date and location discloses the intended plans, where known.)	Date time (UT)	Local time zone (Note: To convert the UT time into standard local, add the number of hours in parentheses to the UT time; for local daylight saving time, add one additional hour. If the result is earlier than 00:00, add 24 hours and subtract 1 from the day; if it is 24:00 or later, subtract 24 hours and add 1 to the day. Historical time zone data obtained from the IANA time zone database.)	Location (Note: Rough place name and a latitude/longitude reference; for rocket-carried tests, the launch location is specified before the detonation location, if known. Some locations are extremely accurate; others (like airdrops and space blasts) may be quite inaccurate. "~" indicates a likely pro-forma rough location, shared with other tests in that same area.)	Elevation + height (Note: Elevation is the ground level at the point directly below the explosion relative to sea level; height is the additional distance added or subtracted by tower, balloon, shaft, tunnel, air drop or other contrivance. For rocket bursts the ground level is "N/A". In some cases it is not clear if the height is absolute or relative to ground, for example, Plumbbob/John. No number or units indicates the value is unknown, while "0" means zero. Sorting on this column is by elevation and height added together.)	Delivery, (Note: Atmospheric, airdrop, balloon, gun, cruise missile, rocket, surface, tower, and barge are all disallowed by the Partial Nuclear Test Ban Treaty. Sealed shaft and tunnel are underground, and remained useful under the PTBT. Intentional cratering tests are borderline; they occurred under the treaty, were sometimes protested, and generally overlooked if the test was declared to be a peaceful use.) Purpose (Note: Include weapons development, weapon effects, safety test, transport safety test, war, science, joint verification and industrial/peaceful, which may be further broken down.)	Device (Note: Designations for test items where known, "?" indicates some uncertainty about the preceding value, nicknames for particular devices in quotes. This category of information is often not officially disclosed.)	Yield (Note: Estimated energy yield in tons, kilotons, and megatons. A ton of TNT equivalent is defined as 4.184 gigajoules (1 gigacalorie).)	Fallout (Note: Radioactive emission to the atmosphere aside from prompt neutrons, where known. The measured species is only iodine-131 if mentioned, otherwise it is all species. No entry means unknown, probably none if underground and "all" if not; otherwise notation for whether measured on the site only or off the site, where known, and the measured amount of radioactivity released.)	References	Notes
708 - 1	22 January 1989 03:57:09.06	ALMT (6 hrs)	Balapan, Semipalatinsk, Kazakhstan: 1328 49.94029°N 78.81603°E	330 m (1,080 ft) +	underground shaft, weapons development		118 kt			
708 - 2	22 January 1989 03:57:09.1	ALMT (6 hrs)	Balapan, Semipalatinsk, Kazakhstan: 1328 49.94029°N 78.81603°E	330 m (1,080 ft) +	underground shaft, weapons development		unknown yield			
709	12 February 1989 04:15:09.26	ALMT (6 hrs)	Balapan, Semipalatinsk, Kazakhstan: 1366 49.9174°N 78.71217°E	330 m (1,080 ft) +	underground shaft, weapons development		63 kt			
710	17 February 1989 04:01:09.22	ALMT (6 hrs)	Degelen, Semipalatinsk, Kazakhstan: 139 49.8235°N 78.068°E	648 m (2,126 ft) +	tunnel, weapons development		10 kt			
711	8 July 1989 03:47:00.09	ALMT (6 hrs)	Balapan, Semipalatinsk, Kazakhstan: 1352 49.86849°N 78.77867°E	330 m (1,080 ft) +	underground shaft, weapons development		22 kt			
712 - 1	2 September 1989 04:16:59.85	ALMT (6 hrs)	Balapan, Semipalatinsk, Kazakhstan: 1410 50.00945°N 78.98467°E	330 m (1,080 ft) +	underground shaft, weapons development		6 kt			
712 - 2	2 September 1989 04:16:59.9	ALMT (6 hrs)	Balapan, Semipalatinsk, Kazakhstan: 1410 50.00945°N 78.98467°E	330 m (1,080 ft) +	underground shaft, weapons development		unknown yield			
713	4 October 1989 11:30:00.16	ALMT (6 hrs)	Degelen, Semipalatinsk, Kazakhstan: 169/2 49.7498°N 78.0117°E	680 m (2,230 ft) – 94 m (308 ft)	tunnel, weapon effect		4 kt			
714 - 1	19 October 1989 09:49:59.98	ALMT (6 hrs)	Balapan, Semipalatinsk, Kazakhstan: 1365 49.92222°N 78.90833°E	330 m (1,080 ft) – 628 m (2,060 ft)	underground shaft, weapons development		85 kt			
714 - 2	19 October 1989 09:50:00.0	ALMT (6 hrs)	Balapan, Semipalatinsk, Kazakhstan: 1365 49.92222°N 78.90833°E	330 m (1,080 ft) – 592 m (1,942 ft)	underground shaft, weapons development		unknown yield			
714 - 3	19 October 1989 09:50:00.0	ALMT (6 hrs)	Balapan, Semipalatinsk, Kazakhstan: 1365 49.92222°N 78.90833°E	330 m (1,080 ft) – 556 m (1,824 ft)	underground shaft, weapons development		unknown yield			
