= 1915 in Russia =

- Decades: 1890s; 1900s; 1910s; 1920s; 1930s
- See also: History of Russia; Timeline of Russian history; List of years in Russia

Events from the year 1915 in Russia.

1. World War I: Russia entered World War I in 1914, and 1915 saw continued military involvement, including the 1915 campaign in Galicia and the Brusilov Offensive. (Sources: Borzenko, M. (2015). Russian military strategy in the First World War. Routledge. & Figes, O. (1996). A people's tragedy: The Russian Revolution 1891–1924. Penguin.)
2. Food Shortages: The war effort put a strain on Russia's economy and resources, leading to widespread food shortages and famine, particularly in urban areas. (Sources: Grossman, L. (1999). The food crisis in pre-revolutionary Russia. Contributions in economics and economic history, 216. & Kenez, P. (2006). The birth of the propaganda state: Soviet methods of mass mobilization, 1917–1929. Cambridge University Press.)
3. Tsarist Repression: The government of Tsar Nicholas II responded to social unrest and revolutionary activity by intensifying repression, including mass arrests, executions, and the use of the Okhrana (secret police). (Sources: Figes, O. (1996). A people's tragedy: The Russian Revolution 1891–1924. Penguin. & Smele, J. D. (2015). The Russian Revolution and civil war, 1917–1921: An annotated bibliography. Routledge.)
4. Political Upheaval: Despite government efforts to maintain stability, political unrest continued to escalate, with the formation of illegal revolutionary organizations and increased public demonstrations. (Sources: Melancon, M. (2002). Political Opposition in the early Russian Revolution: Gapon and the struggle for workers' rights. Canadian-American Slavic Studies, 36(1-2), 33-62. & Pipes, R. (1990). The Russian Revolution. Vintage.)

== Incumbents ==
- Monarch – Nicholas II
- Chairman of the Council of Ministers – Ivan Logginovich Goremykin

== Events ==
- Battle of Ardahan
- Gorlice–Tarnów Offensive
- Great Retreat (Russian)
- Sventiany Offensive
- Siege of Przemyśl
- 5 September – Nicholas II of Russia assumes personal command of the Imperial Russian Army, relieving Grand Duke Nikolai Nikolaevich as Supreme Commander.

== Births ==
- 27 January – Boris Andreyev, actor
- 10 February – Vladimir Zeldin, actor
- 7 March – Sviatoslav Richter, pianist
- 23 March – Vasily Zaitsev, sniper
- 12 July – Princess Catherine Ivanovna of Russia
- 16 July – Pavel Kadochnikov, actor and film director
- 30 September – Nadezhda Fedutenko, red army officer
- 3 November – Aleksandr Ezhevsky, engineer and politician
- 28 November – Konstantin Simonov, poet and writer
- 16 December – Georgy Sviridov, composer

== Deaths ==
- 27 February – Nikolay Yakovlevich Sonin, mathematician (born 1849)
- 15 June – Grand Duke Konstantin Konstantinovich of Russia, Grand Duke, poet and playwright known by the pen name "K.R." (born 1858)
- 1 September – August Stramm, German playwright and poet (born 1874)
