= Tishino =

Village in Kaliningrad Oblast

Tishino Тишино
- Rural locality
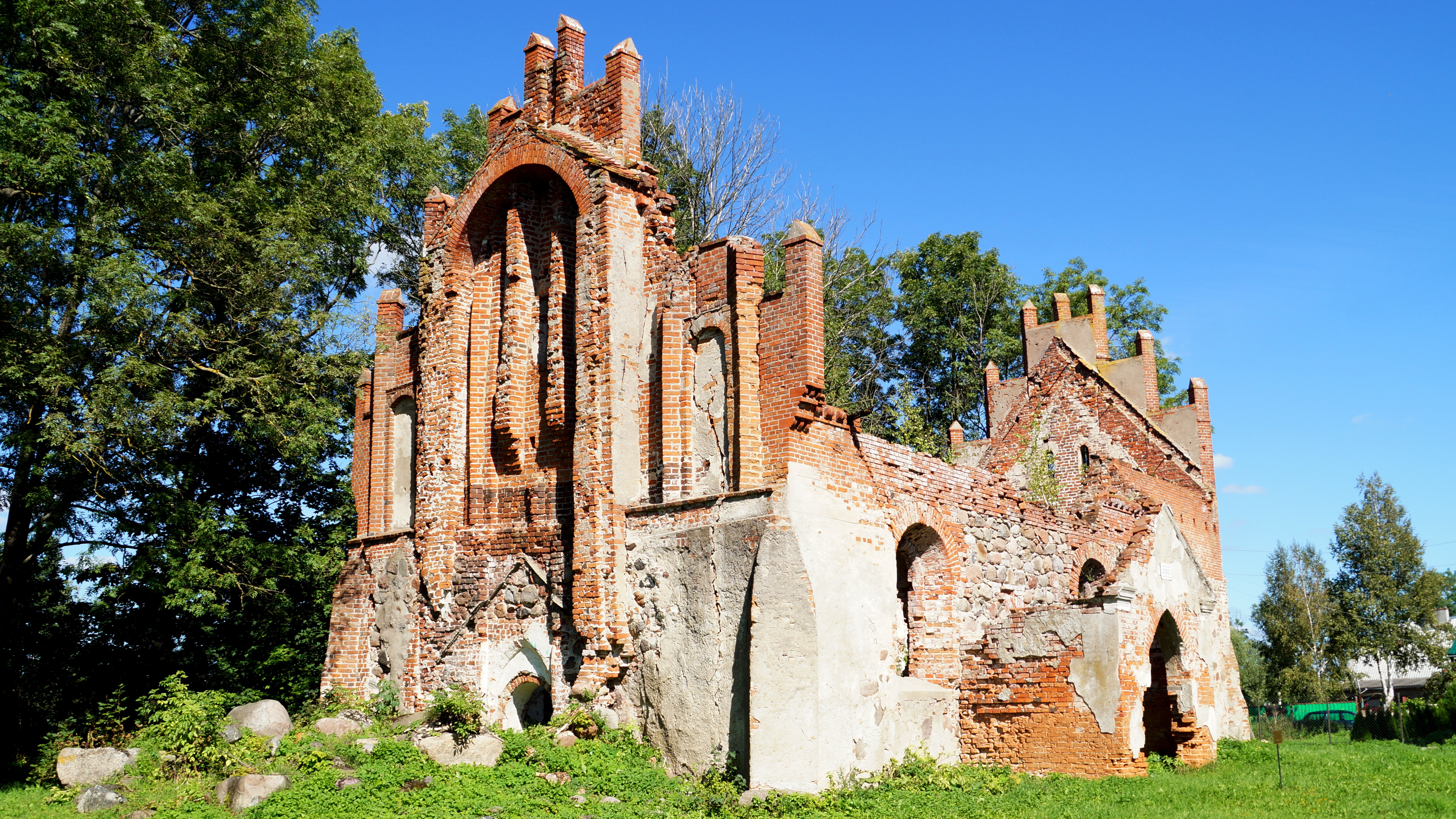
- Old church ruins
- Interactive map of Tishino
- Location of Tishino Tishino (European Russia) Tishino (Russia)
- Coordinates: 54°29′10″N 20°45′10″E
- Country: Russia
- Federal subject: Kaliningrad Oblast
- Founded: 1365 (Julian)
- Elevation: 42 m (138 ft)

Population
  - Estimate (2010): 453 )
- Time zone: UTC+2 (MSK–1)
- Postal code: 238422
- OKTMO ID: 27703000251

Tishino (Russian: Тишино; German: Abschwangen) is a village in Bagrationovsky District, Kaliningrad Oblast, Russia.

== History ==
The village was founded in 1365. In 1454, it was incorporated to the Kingdom of Poland by King Casimir IV Jagiellon upon the request of the anti-Teutonic Prussian Confederation, and following the peace treaty of 1466, it was a part of Poland as a fief held by the Teutonic Knights. From the 18th century, it was part of the Kingdom of Prussia, and from 1871 to 1945 it was also part of Germany.

On 29 August 1914, it was the scene of the Abschwangen massacre during the opening states of World War I. Taking the village without resistance, Imperial Russian troops killed 65 German civilians and razed the area.
