= 1912 in Russia =

- Decades: 1890s; 1900s; 1910s; 1920s; 1930s
- See also: History of Russia; Timeline of Russian history; List of years in Russia

Events from the year 1912 in Russia.

== Incumbents ==
- Monarch – Nicholas II
- Chairman of the Council of Ministers – Vladimir Nikolayevich Kokovtsov
- Metropolitan and Archbishop of Moscow - St. Vladimir Vasily Bogoyavlensky

== Events ==
- Russian Empire at the 1912 Summer Olympics
- Brusilov Expedition
- Sedov Expedition
- Lena massacre
- 1912 Russian legislative election
- Moscow Art Theatre production of Hamlet
- Architect Vladimir Semyonov returns to Russia after having defected to London
- St. Macarius II Mikhail Nevsky assumed the role of Metropolitan and Archbishop of Moscow.

== Births ==
- 19 January – Leonid Vitaliyevich Kantorovich, Soviet mathematician and economist.
- 1 March – Boris Yevseyevich Chertok, Russian engineer in the former Soviet space program.
- 4 November – Vadim Salmanov, Russian composer.

== Deaths ==
- Alexey Suvorin - publisher and journalist
