= 1987 Soviet nuclear tests =

1987

Information
- Country: Soviet Union
- Test site: Aktobe, Kazakhstan; Balapan, Semipalatinsk, Kazakhstan; Degelen, Semipalatinsk, Kazakhstan; NZ Area B, Matochkin Shar, Novaya Zemlya, Russia; Perm, Russia; Sakha, Russia
- Period: 1987
- Number of tests: 24
- Test type: underground shaft, tunnel
- Max. yield: 150 kilotonnes of TNT (630 TJ)

Test series chronology

The Soviet Union's 1987 nuclear test series was a group of 24 nuclear tests conducted in 1987. These tests (Note: A bomb test may be a salvo test, defined as two or more explosions "where a period of time between successive individual explosions does not exceed 5 seconds and where the burial points of all explosive devices can be connected by segments of straight lines, each of them connecting two burial points and does not exceed 40 kilometers in length". Mikhailov, V. N. "Catalog of World Wide Nuclear Testing". Begell-Atom, LLC. Archived from the original on 2014-04-26.) followed the 1985 Soviet nuclear tests series and preceded the 1988 Soviet nuclear tests series.

Soviet Union's 1987 series tests and detonations
Name (Note: The US, France and Great Britain have code-named their test events, while the USSR and China did not, and therefore have only test numbers (with some exceptions – Soviet peaceful explosions were named). Word translations into English in parentheses unless the name is a proper noun. A dash followed by a number indicates a member of a salvo event. The US also sometimes named the individual explosions in such a salvo test, which results in "name1 – 1(with name2)". If test is canceled or aborted, then the row data like date and location discloses the intended plans, where known.)	Date time (UT)	Local time zone (Note: To convert the UT time into standard local, add the number of hours in parentheses to the UT time; for local daylight saving time, add one additional hour. If the result is earlier than 00:00, add 24 hours and subtract 1 from the day; if it is 24:00 or later, subtract 24 hours and add 1 to the day. v)	Location (Note: Rough place name and a latitude/longitude reference; for rocket-carried tests, the launch location is specified before the detonation location, if known. Some locations are extremely accurate; others (like airdrops and space blasts) may be quite inaccurate. "~" indicates a likely pro-forma rough location, shared with other tests in that same area.)	Elevation + height (Note: Elevation is the ground level at the point directly below the explosion relative to sea level; height is the additional distance added or subtracted by tower, balloon, shaft, tunnel, air drop or other contrivance. For rocket bursts the ground level is "N/A". In some cases it is not clear if the height is absolute or relative to ground, for example, Plumbbob/John. No number or units indicates the value is unknown, while "0" means zero. Sorting on this column is by elevation and height added together.)	Delivery, (Note: Atmospheric, airdrop, balloon, gun, cruise missile, rocket, surface, tower, and barge are all disallowed by the Partial Nuclear Test Ban Treaty. Sealed shaft and tunnel are underground, and remained useful under the PTBT. Intentional cratering tests are borderline; they occurred under the treaty, were sometimes protested, and generally overlooked if the test was declared to be a peaceful use.) Purpose (Note: Include weapons development, weapon effects, safety test, transport safety test, war, science, joint verification and industrial/peaceful, which may be further broken down.)	Device (Note: Designations for test items where known, "?" indicates some uncertainty about the preceding value, nicknames for particular devices in quotes. This category of information is often not officially disclosed.)	Yield (Note: Estimated energy yield in tons, kilotons, and megatons. A ton of TNT equivalent is defined as 4.184 gigajoules (1 gigacalorie).)	Fallout (Note: Radioactive emission to the atmosphere aside from prompt neutrons, where known. The measured species is only iodine-131 if mentioned, otherwise it is all species. No entry means unknown, probably none if underground and "all" if not; otherwise notation for whether measured on the site only or off the site, where known, and the measured amount of radioactivity released.)	References	Notes
669	26 February 1987 04:58:24.3	ALMT (6 hrs)	Degelen, Semipalatinsk, Kazakhstan: 130 49.8299°N 78.0835°E	635 m (2,083 ft) +	tunnel, fundamental science		24 kt			
670 - 1	12 March 1987 01:57:19.63	ALMT (6 hrs)	Balapan, Semipalatinsk, Kazakhstan: 1315 49.93633°N 78.82663°E	330 m (1,080 ft) +	underground shaft, weapons development		11 kt			
670 - 2	12 March 1987 01:57:19.6	ALMT (6 hrs)	Balapan, Semipalatinsk, Kazakhstan: 1315 49.93633°N 78.82663°E	330 m (1,080 ft) +	underground shaft, weapons development		unknown yield			
671	3 April 1987 01:17:10.36	ALMT (6 hrs)	Balapan, Semipalatinsk, Kazakhstan: 1318 49.91914°N 78.77961°E	330 m (1,080 ft) +	underground shaft, weapons development		140 kt			
672 - 1	3 April 1987 01:17:12.32	ALMT (6 hrs)	Degelen, Semipalatinsk, Kazakhstan: 208 49.7467°N 78.1162°E	597 m (1,959 ft) +	tunnel, weapons development		1 kt			
672 - 2	3 April 1987 01:17:12.3	ALMT (6 hrs)	Degelen, Semipalatinsk, Kazakhstan: 208 49.7467°N 78.1162°E	597 m (1,959 ft) +	tunnel, weapons development		unknown yield			
672 - 3	3 April 1987 01:17:12.3	ALMT (6 hrs)	Degelen, Semipalatinsk, Kazakhstan: 208 49.7467°N 78.1162°E	597 m (1,959 ft) +	tunnel, weapons development		unknown yield			
unnumbered #11	17 April 1987	ALMT (6 hrs)	Degelen, Semipalatinsk, Kazakhstan: 175-3p 49.751°N 78.049°E	+	tunnel,		no yield			
673 - 1	17 April 1987 01:03:07.14	ALMT (6 hrs)	Balapan, Semipalatinsk, Kazakhstan: 1384 49.87668°N 78.66917°E	330 m (1,080 ft) +	underground shaft, weapons development		86 kt			
673 - 2	17 April 1987 01:03:07.1	ALMT (6 hrs)	Balapan, Semipalatinsk, Kazakhstan: 1384 49.87668°N 78.66917°E	330 m (1,080 ft) +	underground shaft, weapons development		unknown yield			
673 - 3	17 April 1987 01:03:07.1	ALMT (6 hrs)	Balapan, Semipalatinsk, Kazakhstan: 1384 49.87668°N 78.66917°E	330 m (1,080 ft) +	underground shaft, weapons development		unknown yield			
674 Geliy 3 (Helium)	19 April 1987 04:00:00.0	SVET (5 hrs)	Perm, Russia: 404 60.6°N 57.2°E	– 2,015 m (6,611 ft)	underground shaft, oil stimulation		3.2 kt			Oil recovery intensification. 170 km NE Bereznyaki.
675 Geliy 3 (Helium)	19 April 1987 04:05:00.0	SVET (5 hrs)	Perm, Russia: 405 60.8°N 57.5°E	– 2,055 m (6,742 ft)	underground shaft, oil stimulation		3.2 kt			Oil recovery intensification. 170 km NE Bereznyaki.
676	6 May 1987 04:02:08.11	ALMT (6 hrs)	Degelen, Semipalatinsk, Kazakhstan: 164 49.7742°N 77.9986°E	772 m (2,533 ft) +	tunnel, fundamental science		40 kt			
677	6 June 1987 02:37:09.25	ALMT (6 hrs)	Degelen, Semipalatinsk, Kazakhstan: 138 49.8327°N 78.0704°E	604 m (1,982 ft) +	tunnel, fundamental science		24 kt			
678 - 1	20 June 1987 00:53:07.16	ALMT (6 hrs)	Balapan, Semipalatinsk, Kazakhstan: 1326 49.93774°N 78.74298°E	330 m (1,080 ft) +	underground shaft, weapons development		107 kt			
678 - 2	20 June 1987 00:53:07.2	ALMT (6 hrs)	Balapan, Semipalatinsk, Kazakhstan: 1326 49.93774°N 78.74298°E	330 m (1,080 ft) +	underground shaft, weapons development		unknown yield			
679 Neva 2	7 July 1987 00:00:00.0	YAKT (9 hrs)	Sakha, Russia: 68 61.5°N 112.85°E	– 1,515 m (4,970 ft)	underground shaft, oil stimulation		15 kt			Oil recovery intensification.
680	17 July 1987 01:17:09.18	ALMT (6 hrs)	Degelen, Semipalatinsk, Kazakhstan: 168 49.7664°N 78.0287°E	738 m (2,421 ft) – 267 m (876 ft)	tunnel, fundamental science		78 kt			
681 Neva 3	24 July 1987 02:00:00.0	YAKT (9 hrs)	Sakha, Russia: 61 61.45°N 112.8°E	– 1,520 m (4,990 ft)	underground shaft, oil stimulation		15 kt			Oil recovery intensification.
683 - 1	2 August 1987 00:58:09.27	ALMT (6 hrs)	Balapan, Semipalatinsk, Kazakhstan: 1348 49.88113°N 78.87414°E	330 m (1,080 ft) +	underground shaft, weapons development		72 kt			
683 - 2	2 August 1987 00:58:09.3	ALMT (6 hrs)	Balapan, Semipalatinsk, Kazakhstan: 1348 49.88113°N 78.87414°E	330 m (1,080 ft) +	underground shaft, weapons development		unknown yield			
683 - 3	2 August 1987 00:58:09.3	ALMT (6 hrs)	Balapan, Semipalatinsk, Kazakhstan: 1348 49.88113°N 78.87414°E	330 m (1,080 ft) +	underground shaft, weapons development		unknown yield			
682 - 1	2 August 1987 02:00:00.2	MSK (3 hrs)	NZ Area B, Matochkin Shar, Novaya Zemlya, Russia: A-37A 73.326°N 54.602°E	100 m (330 ft) – 390 m (1,280 ft)	tunnel, weapons development		150 kt	Venting detected off site, 1.5 kCi (56 TBq)		
682 - 2	2 August 1987 02:00:00.2	MSK (3 hrs)	NZ Area B, Matochkin Shar, Novaya Zemlya, Russia: A-37A 73.326°N 54.602°E	100 m (330 ft) +	tunnel, weapons development		unknown yield			
682 - 3	2 August 1987 02:00:00.2	MSK (3 hrs)	NZ Area B, Matochkin Shar, Novaya Zemlya, Russia: A-37A 73.326°N 54.602°E	100 m (330 ft) +	tunnel, weapons development		unknown yield			
682 - 4	2 August 1987 02:00:00.2	MSK (3 hrs)	NZ Area B, Matochkin Shar, Novaya Zemlya, Russia: A-37A 73.326°N 54.602°E	100 m (330 ft) +	tunnel, fundamental science		unknown yield			
682 - 5	2 August 1987 02:00:00.2	MSK (3 hrs)	NZ Area B, Matochkin Shar, Novaya Zemlya, Russia: A-37A 73.326°N 54.602°E	100 m (330 ft) +	tunnel, safety experiment		unknown yield			
684 Neva 4	12 August 1987 01:30:00.5	YAKT (9 hrs)	Sakha, Russia: 101 61.45°N 112.8°E	– 834 m (2,736 ft)	underground shaft, oil stimulation		3.2 kt			Oil recovery intensification.
685 - 1	18 September 1987 02:32:10.01	ALMT (6 hrs)	Degelen, Semipalatinsk, Kazakhstan: 132p 49.806°N 78.0997°E	719 m (2,359 ft) +	tunnel, weapon effect		1.1 kt			
685 - 2	18 September 1987 02:32:10.0	ALMT (6 hrs)	Degelen, Semipalatinsk, Kazakhstan: 132p 49.806°N 78.0997°E	719 m (2,359 ft) +	tunnel, safety experiment		unknown yield			
686 Batolit 2 (Batholith)	3 October 1987 15:15:00.0	AKTT (6 hrs)	Aktobe, Kazakhstan: BT-2 47.6°N 56.2°E	– 1,000 m (3,300 ft)	underground shaft, seismic sounding		8.5 kt			Seismic probing program.
687	16 October 1987 06:06:06.99	ALMT (6 hrs)	Degelen, Semipalatinsk, Kazakhstan: K-85 49.7313°N 78.0906°E	620 m (2,030 ft) – 82 m (269 ft)	tunnel, weapon effect		1.1 kt			
688 - 1	15 November 1987 03:31:09.17	ALMT (6 hrs)	Balapan, Semipalatinsk, Kazakhstan: 1332 49.89909°N 78.75629°E	330 m (1,080 ft) +	underground shaft, weapons development		103 kt			
688 - 2	15 November 1987 03:31:09.2	ALMT (6 hrs)	Balapan, Semipalatinsk, Kazakhstan: 1332 49.89909°N 78.75629°E	330 m (1,080 ft) +	underground shaft, weapons development		unknown yield			
689 - 1	13 December 1987 03:21:07.25	ALMT (6 hrs)	Balapan, Semipalatinsk, Kazakhstan: 1355 49.96185°N 78.79222°E	330 m (1,080 ft) +	underground shaft, weapons development		137 kt			
689 - 2	13 December 1987 03:21:07.3	ALMT (6 hrs)	Balapan, Semipalatinsk, Kazakhstan: 1355 49.96185°N 78.79222°E	330 m (1,080 ft) +	underground shaft, weapons development		unknown yield			
690	20 December 1987 02:55:09.14	ALMT (6 hrs)	Degelen, Semipalatinsk, Kazakhstan: 164p 49.7742°N 77.9986°E	772 m (2,533 ft) +	tunnel, fundamental science		5 kt			
691 - 1	27 December 1987 03:05:07.22	ALMT (6 hrs)	Balapan, Semipalatinsk, Kazakhstan: 1388 49.87979°N 78.72368°E	330 m (1,080 ft) +	underground shaft, weapons development		117 kt			
691 - 2	27 December 1987 03:05:07.2	ALMT (6 hrs)	Balapan, Semipalatinsk, Kazakhstan: 1388 49.87979°N 78.72368°E	330 m (1,080 ft) +	underground shaft, weapons development		unknown yield			
