= Central Moscow Hippodrome =

Horse racing track in Moscow, Russia

Coordinates: 55°46′40″N 37°33′42″E

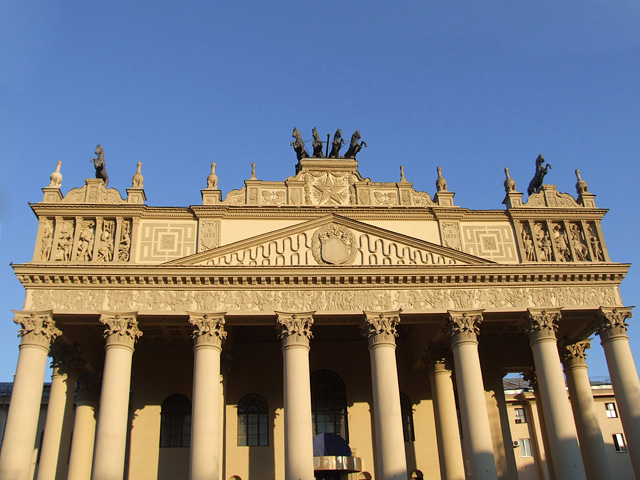
- Moscow Hippodrome entrance
- Location: Moscow, Russia
- Date opened: 1834
- Race type: Horse racing
- Course type: Hippodrome

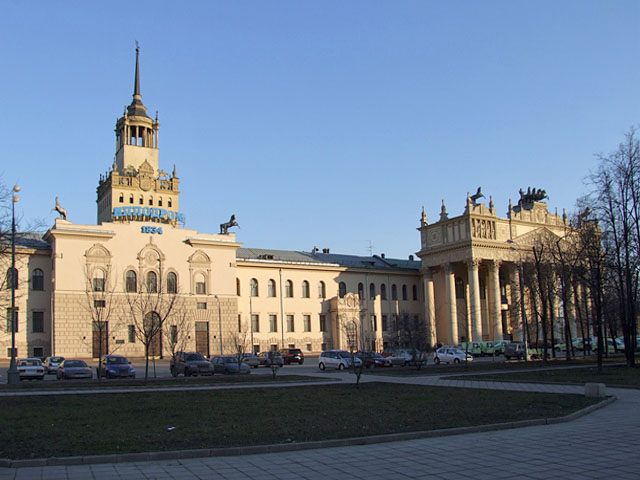
Central Moscow Hippodrome

Central Moscow Hippodrome (Russian: Центральный Московский ипподром), founded in 1834 in Moscow, is the largest horse racing track in Russia. The site includes a horse breeding research facility.
