= Fyodor Kamensky =

American sculptor

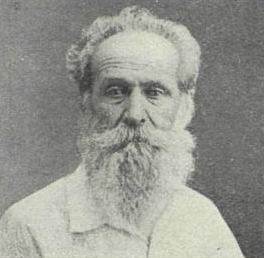
Fyodor Kamensky

Fyodor Fyodorovich Kamensky (Russian: Фёдор Фёдорович Каменский; 2 September [O.S. 21 August] 1836 – 26 August 1913) was a Russian sculptor. From 1873 on he worked in the U.S.

== Biography ==
Kamensky was born in Lesnoye, a suburb of Saint Petersburg, to the family of an administrator of the Imperial Forestry Institute in the city. In 1852-1860 he studied at the Imperial Academy of Arts under Nikolai Pimenov, Peter Clodt von Jürgensburg and Feodor Bruni. In Academy he received gold medals for bas-reliefs Senate asked Cincinnatus to stay in Rome and Regulus returns to Carthage. Made busts of Taras Shevchenko and Feodor Bruni. Kamensky's works were praised by Vladimir Stasov who saw them as the first break from the idealization of the subjects. Kamensky received Academy scholarship and in 1863-1869 studied in Italy.

Among sculptures made in Italy were sentimental sculptures First Step, Young Sculptor, Widow, Girl Picking Mushrooms, Children in the Rain, and the model of a monument to Mikhail Glinka. For the sculpture Widow he became an Academician of the Imperial Academy of Arts and moved back to Saint-Petersburg.

Still in 1870 he returned to Florence and in 1873 he moved to Florida, United States. In United States he became a farmer. Still he continued his sculpturing making decorations for the Kansas government building, project of "Roman fountains" in New York City, sculpture Amor for Tampa, Florida.

A bit different history was published in Russia. "Fedor Kamensky, a sculptor already well-known to the Russian public, a student of N. S. Pimenov, left Russia in 1871. After a short stay in Kansas, he moved to Florida in 1883 to the city of Clearwater, where he bought an eight-acre plot of land and built it house on the shore of the Gulf of Mexico. ... it is not known for what reasons Kamensky left Russia. When Kamensky settled in Clearwater, only 16 families lived there. His arrival coincides with the arrival of Dementiev (Peter Demens). ... the first wife of Kamensky died in Florence, leaving his daughter Sofia. Sofia Kamenskaya was later a teacher in New Jersey. In America, Kamensky married a second time, to a native of Switzerland, they had three children. In the same 1883, nephew Ivan Filippov came to Kamensky from Russia, whose parents owned stud farms in southern Russia. Ivan Filippov succeeded in Florida by becoming a major construction contractor. In Clearwater, he built the Capitol Theater, the Scronton Hotel, the city hall and the first bank, and many other houses that adorned the city."

In 1893 during preparations for the World's Columbian Exposition in Chicago he became the Commissioner of Fine Arts for the Russian exposition. He prepared "huge concrete sculptures for the pavilion" as well as selected 130 paintings and statues from Russia to be presented on the exhibition. His last years he worked on a complex World sculpture (unfinished). Fyodor Kamensky died in Clearwater, Florida, on 26 August 1913.

== Selected sculptures ==
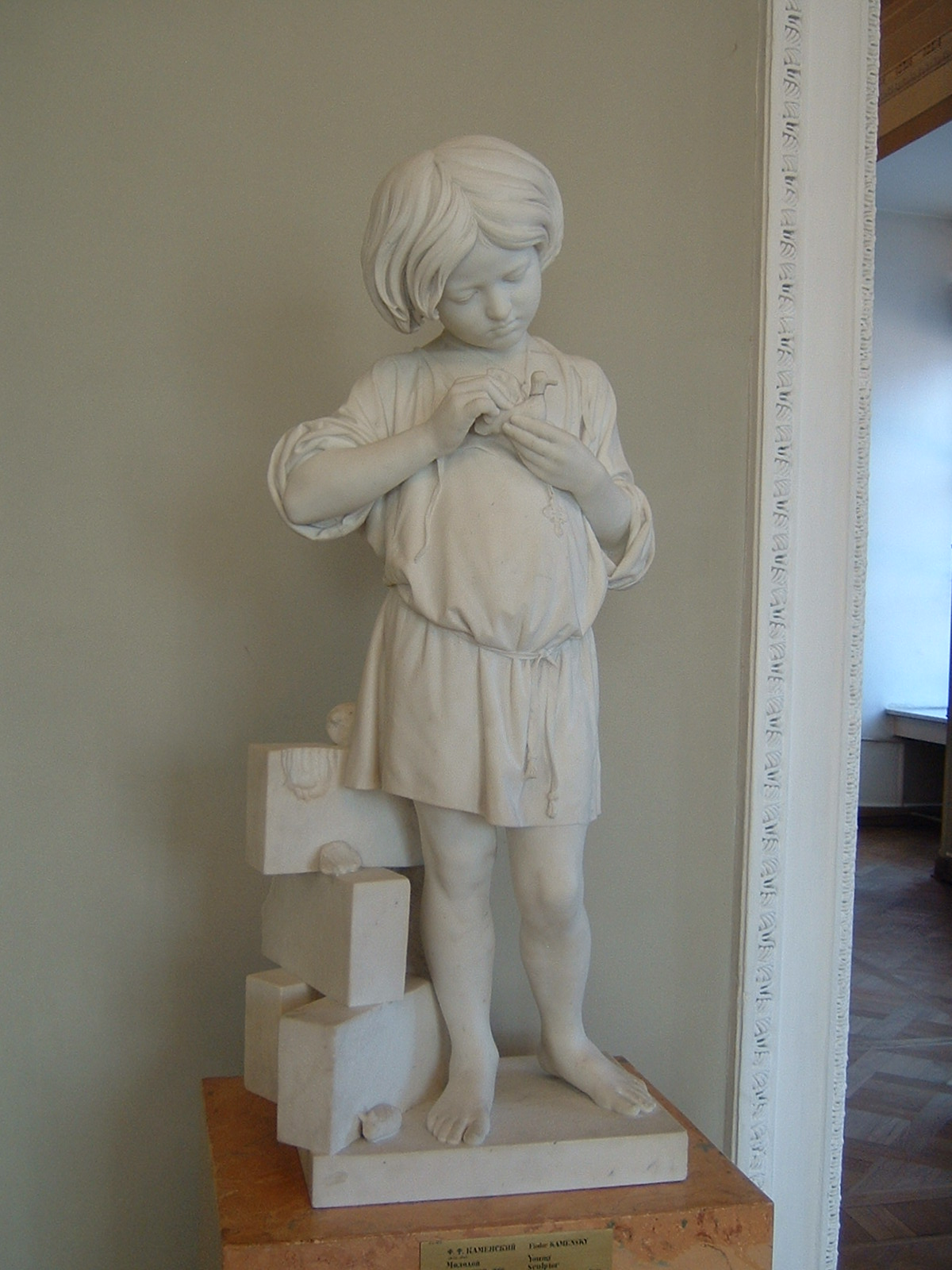
Young sculptor, 1866

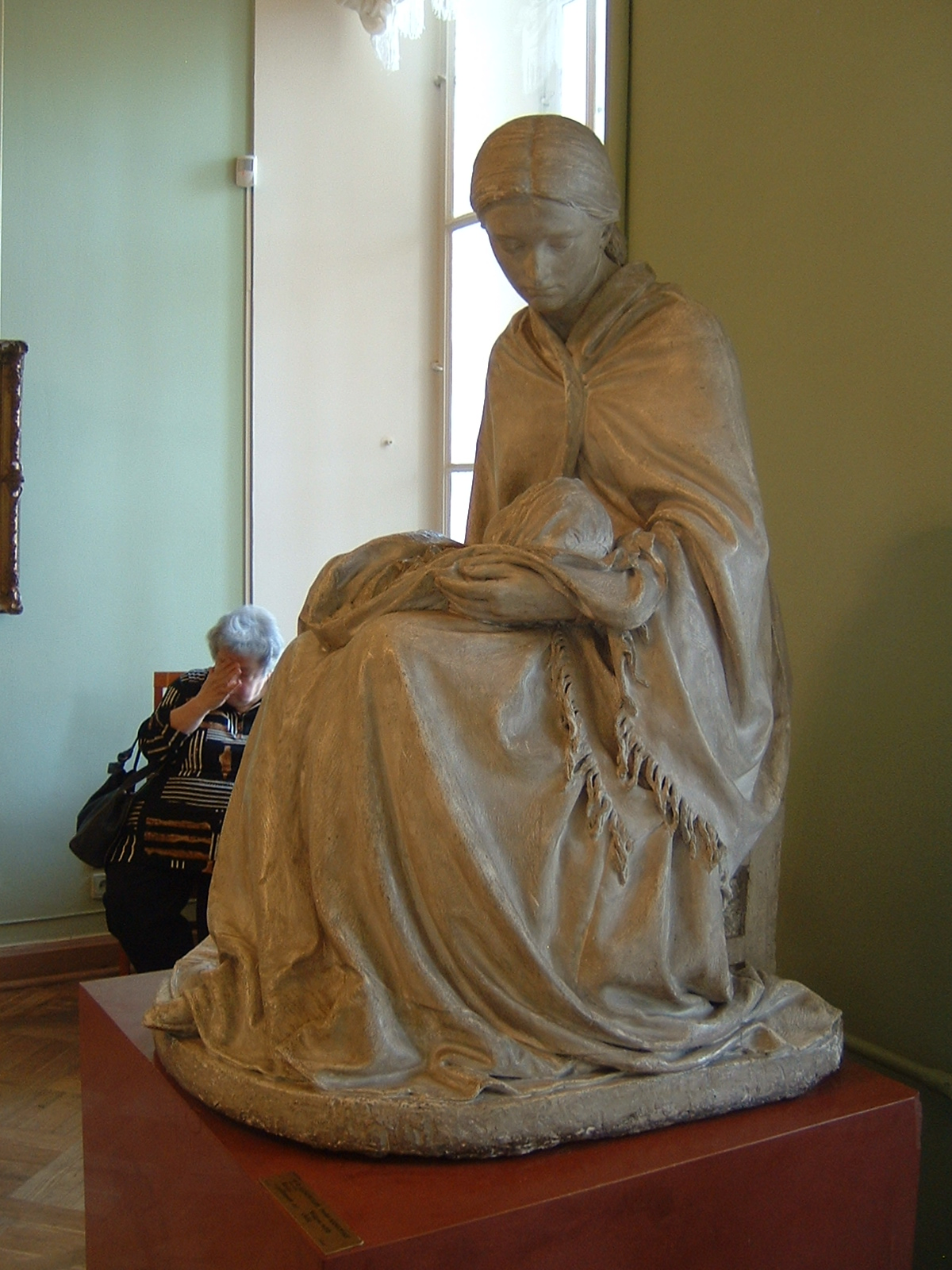
Widow and her son, 1867

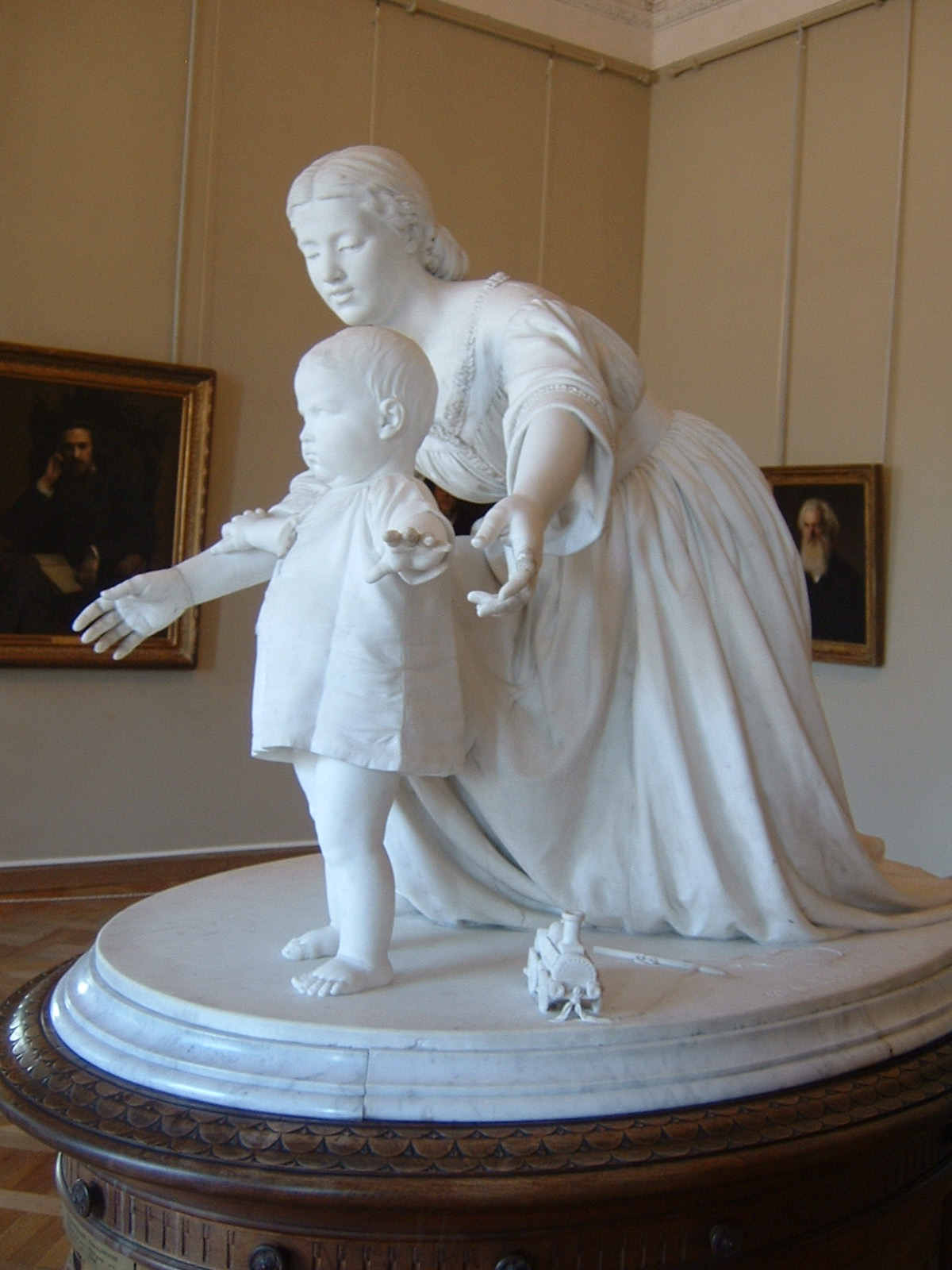
First Step, 1872
(marble version)

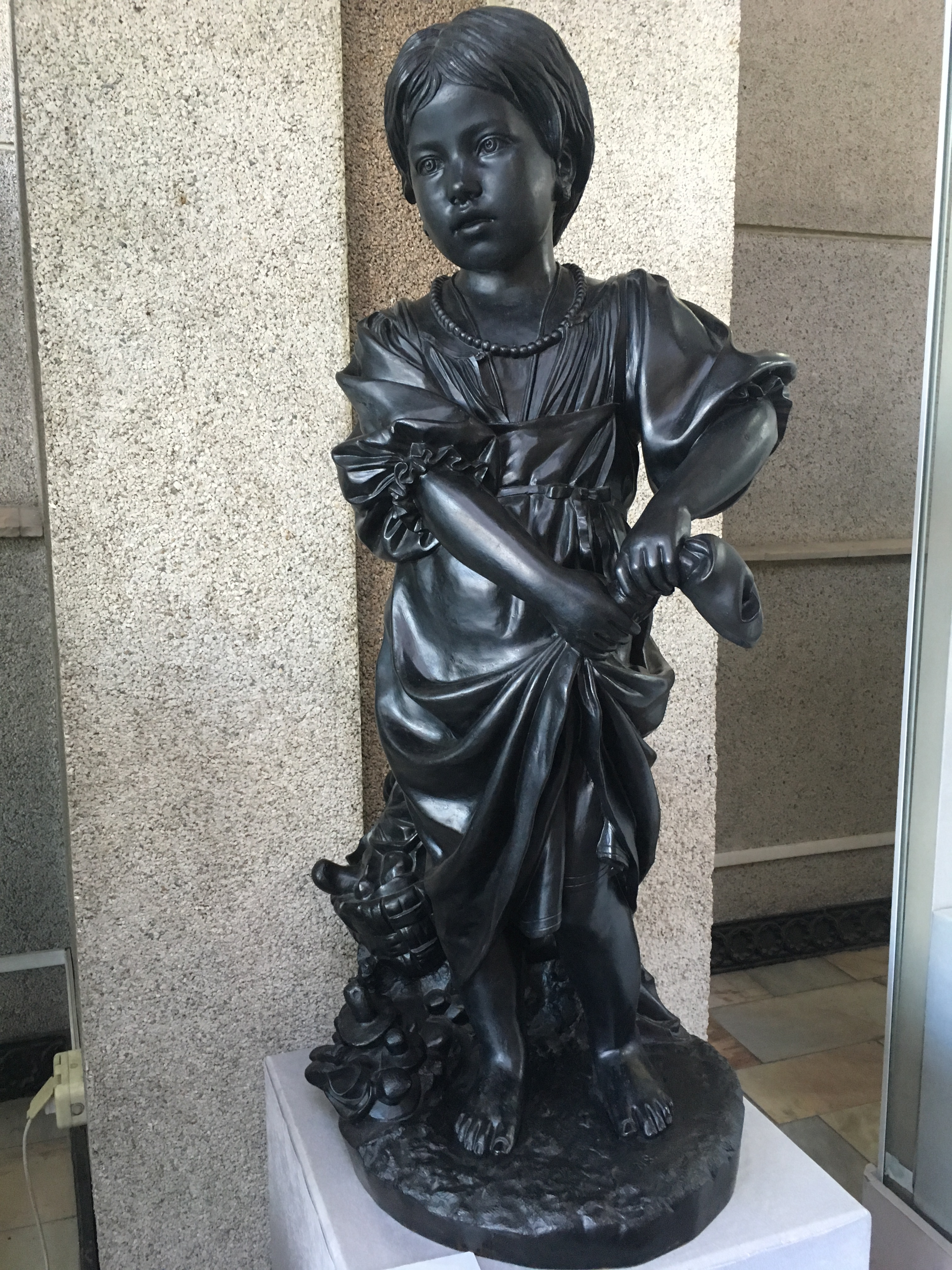
Girl mushroom
(iron casting based on an 1871 plaster model of Gribovnitsa)
