= Di Tsayt (Saint Petersburg) =

Yiddish-language weekly newspaper in St. Petersburg, Russia (1913-1914)

Di Tsayt די צײט
- Type: Weekly
- Founded: 1913
- Ceased publication: 1914
- Political alignment: Bundist
- Language: Yiddish
- Headquarters: Vienna, Saint Petersburg
- Circulation: 9,000
- Sister newspapers: Lebns-fragn (Warsaw), Di yidishe folks-shtime (Warsaw), Dos yidishe folk (Odessa)

Di Tsayt (Yiddish: די צײט, 'The Time') was a Yiddish language weekly newspaper published from Saint Petersburg, Russia. It was an organ of the General Jewish Labour Bund. Whilst the editorial team of Di Tsayt was based in the Austrian capital of Vienna, officially Saint Petersburg was the site of publishing for the journal. Prominent editors included Esther Frumkin, Raphael Abramovitch, Vladimir Medem, Henryk Ehrlich, Moisei Rafes and D. Zaslavsky.

The founding of Di Tsayt ended a four and half year absence of a legal Bundist press, a void created by the banning of Folkstsaytung in 1907. Saint Petersburg had been selected by the Bund Central Committee over Warsaw for the publishing of Di Tsayt, as the Saint Petersburg press censors were perceived as less strict than their Warsaw colleagues. The launching of Di Tsayt was part of an endeavor to set up legal Bundist newspapers in different parts of the Russian empire just before the outbreak of World War I (other examples were Dos yidishe folk in Odessa and Lebns-fragen and Di yidishe folks-shtime in Warsaw).

The first issue of Di Tsayt was published on January 2, 1913 (December 20, 1912). As of late 1913, Di Tsayt had a circulation of 9,000.

In the summer of 1914 the publication was shut down by the government. The last issue was published the eve of the war, June 5, 1914. In total 60 issues of the newspaper had been published. It was relaunched under the name Undzer Tsayt (אונדזער צײט, 'Our Time') on June 24, being issued twice weekly. However, the publication was suppressed again after only seven issues. The last issue came out on July 17, 1914. Undzer Tsayt had two supplements, Dos profesyonele lebn ('Professional life', only one issue was published) and Tsayt-fragn ('Current questions', of which two issues were published).
