= Aleksandr Yezhevsky =

Soviet bureaucrat (1915–2017)

- Александр Ежевский
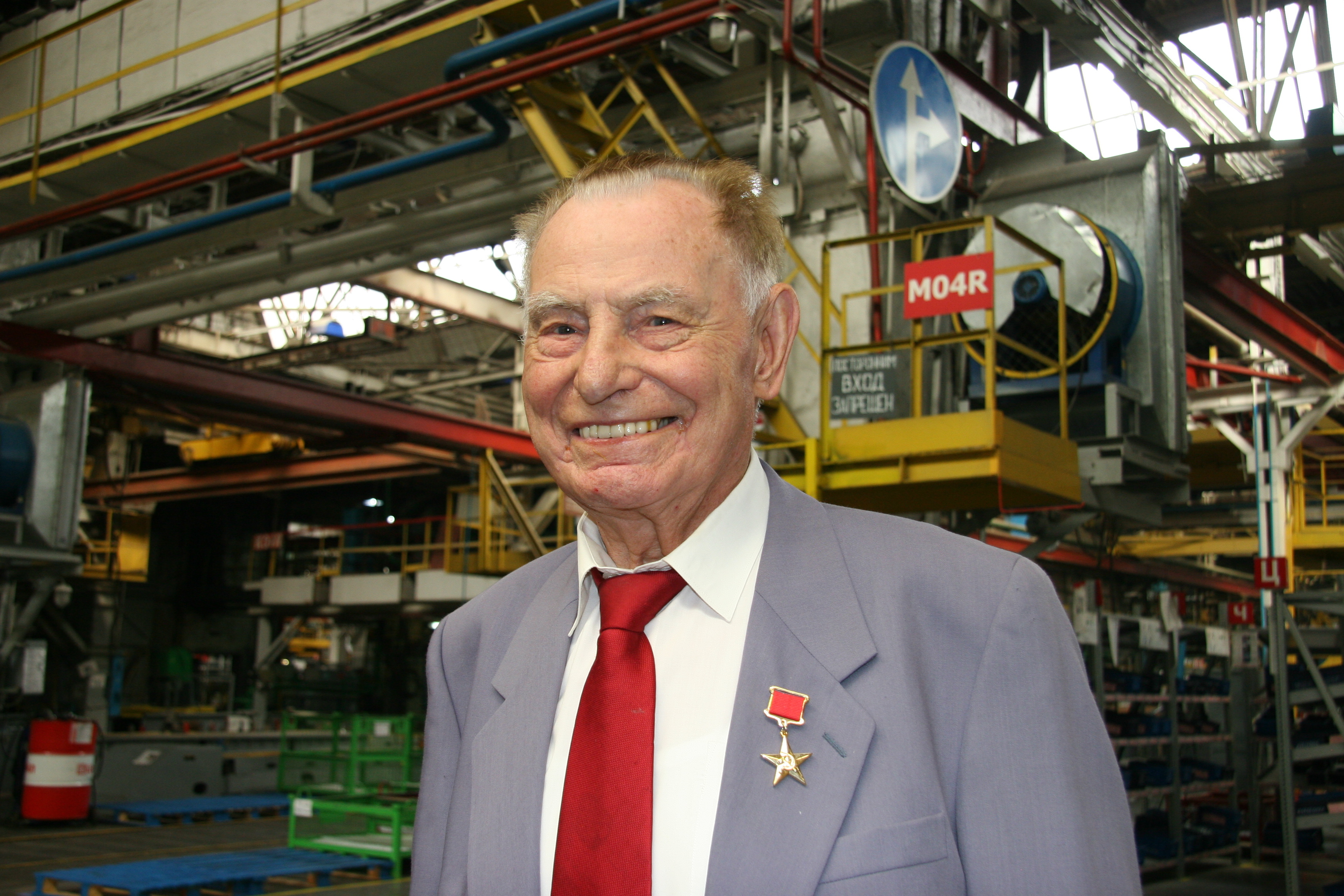
- Yezhevsky in 2014

Minister of Tractor and Agricultural Machinery of the Soviet Union
- In office 1980–1988

Personal details
- Born: 3 November 1915; Tulun, Russian Empire
- Died: 15 January 2017 (aged 101); Moscow, Russia

Aleksandr Aleksandrovich Yezhevsky (Russian: Александр Александрович Ежевский; 3 November [O.S. 21 October] 1915 – 15 January 2017) was a Soviet bureaucrat who was minister of tractor and agricultural machinery (tractor and agricultural engineering) of the Soviet Union (1980–1988). He was born in Tulun, in the Siberian Irkutsk Governorate of the Russian Empire.

Since 2004, he had been Chief Researcher of All-Russian Research Institute of Technology, repair and maintenance of machines and tractors (GOSNITI).

In January 15, 2017 he died in Moscow at the age of 101.

== Awards ==
- Order "For Merit to the Fatherland" 2nd (2015) and 4th class (1995)
- Hero of Socialist Labour
- Honored Engineer of the Russian Federation
- Member of the Bureau of Mechanization of the Russian Agricultural Academy
- Honorary Citizen of the city of Russa (Bulgaria)
- Four Orders of Lenin
- Two Orders of the Red Banner of Labour
