= Zoya Bulgakova =

Soviet and Russian actress

- Зоя Булгакова
- Bulgakova in c. 2017
- Born: Zoya Fyodorovna Bulgakova; 24 December 1914; Novo-Nikolaevsk, Tomsk Governorate, Russian Empire
- Died: 3 February 2017 (aged 102); Novosibirsk, Russia
- Occupations: Actress, theatre instructor
- Years active: 1930–1960
- Awards: (1945)

Zoya Fyodorovna Bulgakova (Russian: Зоя Фёдоровна Булгакова; 24 December 1914 – 3 February 2017) was a Soviet and Russian stage actress and an Honored Artist of the RSFSR (1945). At the time of her death, she was the oldest actress in Russia.

== Biography ==
Bulgakova was born in Novo-Nikolaevsk on 3 February 1914 into a large family. Her father was a cab driver. She started acting in The Novosibirsk Youth Theatre in 1930, becoming one of the first graduates of the theatrical studio. She acted in the theatre for 30 years, playing more than 70 roles. In 1932, she graduated from the school at the Novosibirsk Theatre of Young Spectator (now Novosibirsk Globus Theatre). In 1942, she joined the CPSU.

In 1940 and 1946 she performed at the shows of children's theatre in Moscow. Her name was entered into the Golden Book of Culture of the Novosibirsk region for winning the regional award Honor and Dignity (2001). She performed the role of Red Riding Hood in theater productions from 1937 to 1955; she also played Gerda in the Snow Queen for three years. Her other roles included the traditional parts in theaters for children: Puss in Boots, Little Humpbacked Horse, Snow Maiden, Cinderella, Bunny-Zaznayka and Mitil.

All my life I've played boys and girls. A transvestite's position is a rarity in the theater, so I never felt the lack of demand. By the way, I have always played boys better than girls. Maybe it was because of the nature of my battle: I climbed roofs, trees and fences sometimes better than other boys.

In honor of the centennial anniversary of the actress on 19 December 2014, five days before her 100th birthday, a recital was held at the theater. She died on 3 February 2017, aged 102.
