= Anton Tikhomirov =

Russian ice hockey player

- Born: 23 August 1990 (age 34); St. Petersburg, Russia
- Height: 6 ft 2 in (188 cm)
- Weight: 216 lb (98 kg; 15 st 6 lb)
- Position: Forward
- Shoots: Left
- KHL team: HC Vityaz Podolsk
- NHL draft: Undrafted
- Playing career: 2010–present

Anton Tikhomirov (born 23 August 1990) is a Russian professional ice hockey player.

Tikhomirov played with HC Vityaz Podolsk of the Kontinental Hockey League (KHL) during the 2012–13 season.
