= 1909 in Russia =

- Decades: 1880s; 1890s; 1900s; 1910s; 1920s
- See also: History of Russia; Timeline of Russian history; List of years in Russia

Events from the year 1909 in Russia.

== Incumbents ==
- Monarch – Nicholas II
- Chairman of the Council of Ministers – Pyotr Stolypin

== Events ==
- 20 April - Russian intervention in Persia begins
- 11 May - Novonikolayevsk Fire
- 24 October - Racconigi Bargain
- 29 October - foundation of Kiev Society of Aeronautics
- 14 November - first tram line opened in Pskov
- Release of the first Russo-Balt Type C car
- Foundation of Nizhnevartovsk

== Births ==
- May - Gunsyn Tsydenova, chairman of the Presidium of the Supreme Soviet of the Buryat-Mongol Autonomous Soviet Socialist Republic (d. 1994)
- 1 July - Antonina Pirozhkova, civil engineer and writer (d. 2010)
- 18 July - Andrei Gromyko, Minister of Foreign Affairs of the USSR (1957–1985), Chairman of the Presidium of the Supreme Soviet (de jure head of state, 1985–1988)
- 21 August - Nikolay Bogolyubov, mathematician and physicist (d. 1992)
- 5 September - Bernard Delfont, theatre impresario (d. 1994)
- 22 November - Mikhail Mil, helicopter manufacturer (d. 1970)

== Deaths ==
- 14 January - Admiral Zinovy Rozhestvensky, Russo-Japanese War commander (born 1848)
- 23 February - Nadezhda Trubetskaya, philanthropist (born 1812)
- 13 December - Innokenty Annensky, poet, playwright and translator, critic (born 1855)
