= Treaty of Saint Petersburg (1834) =

1834 treaty between the Ottoman Empire and Russia

The Treaty of Saint Petersburg was concluded on January 29, 1834, between the Ottoman Porte and the Russian Empire. This treaty, by promising the evacuation of the Principalities, and reducing the Turkish payments to one-third of the stipulated amount, relieved the Porte from some engagements enforced on it by the Treaty of Adrianople (the treaty which ended the Russo-Turkish War, 1828–1829).
