= Air Intelligence of Russia =

Branch of the Russian Air Force

Air Intelligence Directorate of the Russian Air Force
- Vozdushnaya Razvedka; Воздушная разведка ВВС РФ; Воздушная разведка
- Russian Air Force Emblem

Agency overview
- Formed: 1911; 115 years ago
- Jurisdiction: Russian Federation
- Employees: Classified
- Annual budget: Classified
- Agency executive: Classified, Commander
- Parent agency: Russian air force
- Child agency: Classified

Air Intelligence of the Russian Air Force (Russian: Воздушная разведка ВВС РФ) is a branch of Russian Air Force responsible for creating an intelligence picture for Air Force missions and participating in creating an overall intelligence picture. Russian aerial reconnaissance is one of the oldest in the world and began to operate back in 1911. Includes a number of reconnaissance and research units on various topics related to air warfare and collaborates with the Military Intelligence Directorate.

== History ==
Aerial reconnaissance or the Air intelligence in Russia was created in 1911 as part of the Imperial Russian Air Service. During the First Balkan War of 1912 to 1913, Russian air units under the command of Captain Shchetinin, together with Bulgaria, carried out aerial reconnaissance tasks, obtaining photographs of the fortresses.

During the First World War the Air reconnaissance began to operate as an independent air force unit.

After the creation of the USSR in 1922 and after the German invasion (Operation Barbarossa of June 22, 1941) 12% of Soviet aircraft carried out intelligence missions. With the escalation of hostilities, the intensity of air patrols also increased. In 1941, the number of patrol aircraft was 9,2%, in 1944 — 15%. Aerial intelligence not only collected data on the enemy, but also supplemented and documented data on other types of reconnaissance for the Red Army. Aerial intelligence was often the only means of obtaining information on the enemy for the military command. Air intelligence during the war was carried out in two ways: visual observation and aerial photography. Moreover, if in 1941 aerial photography accounted for a little more than 10% of all reconnaissance missions, then in 1945 it was exceeded 86%. The weak link of domestic reconnaissance aviation was the absence during the war years of a specialized reconnaissance aircraft.

During the Cold War era (c.1947-1991) it was carried out as part of the Soviet Air Force. Versions of the Mikoyan-Gurevich MiG-25 (ASCC "Foxbat") and Mikoyan-Gurevich MiG-27 (ASCC "Flogger") were designed and used for aerial reconnaissance.

After the dissolution of the Soviet Union in 1991 the aerial reconnaissance service cooperated with The electronic warfare forces and jointly controlled Russian unmanned aerial vehicles.

== Literature ==
- Советская военная энциклопедия. / ред. Н. В. Огарков. М., Воениздат, 1976 год;
- Воздушная разведка железных дорог. М., 1963;
- Лазарев Б. А., Сизов А. II. Фотографические средства воздушной разведки. Ч. 1. Рига, 1973;
- Маковский В. П. Системы обработки и передачи разведпнформации. Ч. 1. Рига, 1973; Соколов А. Н.
- Hовиков А., Юнусов Т. Визуальный поиск наземных целей в сумерках.— «Авиация и космонавтика», 1965, No. 12;
- Разведчик над полем боя.— «Авиация и космонавтика», 1965, No. 9.

== See also ==
- Intelligence Directorate of the Main Staff of the Russian Navy
- GRU
