= Nadezhda Rykalova =

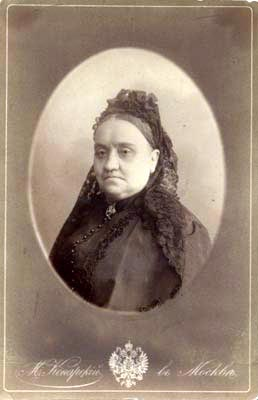
- Born: Надежда Васильевна Рыкалова; July 10, 1824; Moscow, Russian Empire
- Died: January 3, 1914 (aged 89); Moscow, Russian Empire
- Occupation: stage actress

Nadezhda Vasilyevna Rykalova (Russian: Надежда Васильевна Рыкалова; 10 July 1824 – 3 January 1914) was a Russian stage actress, best known for her Maly Theatre performances in plays by Alexander Ostrovsky, who created the Kabanikha character (in The Storm) especially for her.

Rykalova was born in Moscow, then in the Russian Empire. She came from an artistic family and had the famous Russian tragic Mikhail Shchepkin as a mentor. She played more than 400 roles on stage and retired in 1907. She died in Moscow, aged 89.
