= Sev Berd =

Armenian fort

Sev Berd Սև բերդ
- Gyumri, Shirak Province, Armenia
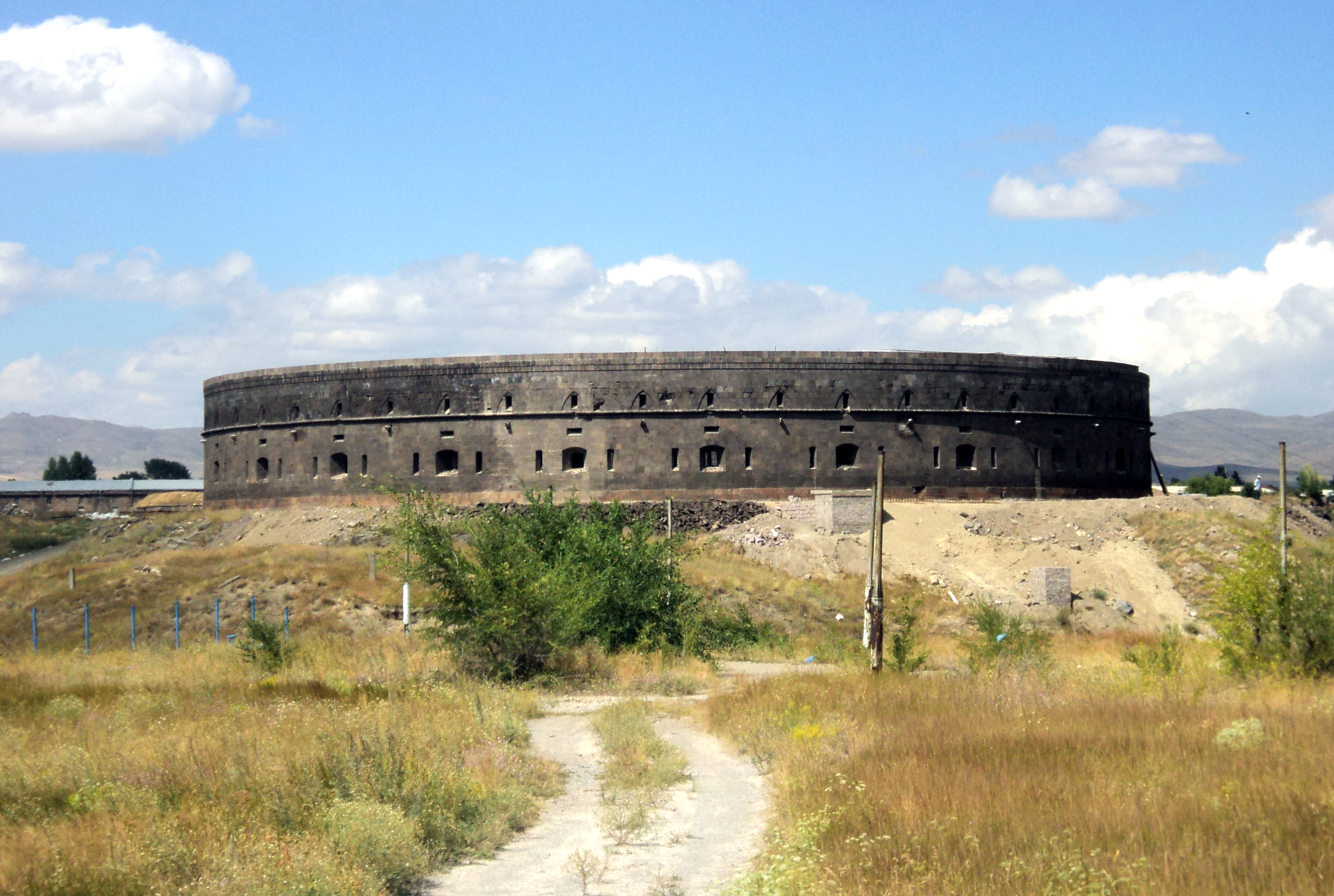
- Sev Berd ("Black Fortress")

Site information
- Type: Fortress
- Controlled by: Armenia

Location
- Location of Sev Berd within Armenia
- Coordinates: 40.782222°N 43.825278°E

Site history
- Built: 1834–1847

Sev Berd or Black Fortress (Armenian: Սև բերդ; Russian: Чёрная Кре́пость, Chornaya Krepost) is an abandoned Russian imperial fortress in Gyumri, Shirak Province, Armenia. The fortress, which lies 8 kilometres (5.0 mi) from the Turkish border, was built in response to the Russo-Turkish War of 1828–1829. It is a national cultural heritage monument in Armenia.

== History ==
Gyumri, which lies on the border with Turkey, became part of the Russian Empire after the Treaty of Gulistan. Gyumri was renamed Alexandropol in 1837 after the visit of Tsar Nicholas I, in honor of his wife, Empress Alexandra Fyodorovna.

The fortress was built on top of a hill, and the full fortification took a decade after the first stones were laid in 1834. The fortress is a 360-degree round structure made of black stone, from which it gets its name. After Russia's loss in the Crimean War, Sev Berd was upgraded and designated a "first-class" fortress. It never underwent a siege, but was of strategic importance in victories over the Turks in subsequent wars that lasted through 1878. The fortress was downgraded to "second-class" status in 1887, after the final Russo-Turkish War of 1877–1878 that saw Russia gain strongholds in Kars and Batumi.

The Russian 102nd Military Base was built in the 1940s next to Sev Berd. The base remains active today for the Russian military, which provides national defense support for Armenia.

== Current status ==
The fortress was purchased by the Balasanyan family in 2012. Owner Misak Balasanyan intends to turn Sev Berd into a tourist attraction.

Archeological efforts are ongoing at the site.
