= Sovremennaya Rech =

Sovremennaya Rech (The Modern Word) was a liberal bourgeois daily newspaper published in St. Petersburg, Russia, from January to May 1907. Politically, the publication supported the Cadets.
