= Benliahmet railway station =

Benliahmet

General information
- Coordinates: 40.4612°N 42.9206°E
- System: TCDD
- Owner: TCDD
- Platforms: 1
- Tracks: 2

Construction
- Structure type: At-grade

Other information
- Status: In Operation

History
- Opened: 1913
- Rebuilt: 1962
Location

Benliahmet station is a freight station near the village of Benliahmet in the Kars Province of Turkey. It is unmanned and has no buildings.
