= Anna Schchian =

Russian botanist (1905–1990)

Anna Semenovna Schchian
- Born: 9 July 1905; Tiflis, Russian Empire
- Died: 15 May 1990 (aged 84); Erevan, Armenia
- Education: Tbilisi State University
- Known for: Study of the Caucasus flora
- Scientific career
- Fields: Botany
- Author abbrev. (botany): Schchian

Anna Semenovna Schchian (Russian: Анна Семёновна Шхиян, 9 July 1905 – 15 May 1990) was a Soviet botanist, working in the Tbilisi Botanical Institute. She is known for her studies of the flora of the Caucasus. The plant Allium schchianiae is named after her.

== Biography ==
Anna Semenova Schchian was born on 9 July 1905 in Tbilisi to a family of teachers. Her passion for natural history led her to the agricultural faculty of Tbilisi State Polytechnic Institute, later named Tbilisi State University. In 1929 she moved to Armenia, where she took part in reforesting around the resort of Arzni. In 1933 she moved to work in the biological section of the Transcaucasian branch of the Academy of Sciences of the USSR in Tbilisi, which in 1934 became the newly established Botanical Institute, Tbilisi. At this time she engaged in significant scientific research, including floristic and geobotanical expeditions across the Caucasus, working up systematic descriptions of complex genera and families, and defending a dissertation.

A great deal of work was done by her on activities of general economic importance to the people of Transcaucasia, this included studying the certification process of winter pastures in a number of districts in the Azerbaijan SSR, conducting a geobotanical survey of the forests of the southern Caucasus, mapping and listing of the plants of region, and conducting research into wild fruiting trees of the forests of eastern Georgia. The results of this work appear in her collection "Useful Plants."

Of particular importance in Schchian's scientific career was her work in systematics. Her master's thesis, which she defended in 1944, was devoted to the systematics and geography of the Caucasian populations of grape hyacinth (Muscari), a work which remains scientifically current. Data from this research was included in various works, especially the eight volume Flora of Georgia (1941–1952), which Schchian helped to edit. Her doctoral dissertation, which consisted of a systematic investigation of the family Dipsacaeae in the Caucasus, was defended in 1974, and came to be widely cited in floras of the Caucasus region.

A. S. Schchian gave lectures in Armenian on systematics and general botany at the Armenian branch of the natural-geographical department of the Pushkin Pedagogical Institute in Tbilisi.

From 1975 she lived in Erevan and worked in the fields of systematics and geography at the Botanical Institute of the Armenian branch of the Academy of Sciences. In the fall of 1989 she participated in the publication of the Flora of Armenia by working up several complex genera. Towards the end of her life she helped to plan preparations for a Flora of the Caucasus.

She has approximately 50 publications.

The plant, Allium schchianae Ogan., is named after her.

== Works ==
- Schchian, A. S. (1974). Family Dipsacaceae A.L.Jussieu in Caucasus. Tbilisi: Metzniereba. p. 27.
- Schchian, A. S. Sistematika i geografiia kavkazskikh vidov roda Muscari mill.. Doctoral Dissertation, 1944.
- Schchian, A. S. (1947), "Zametka o kavkazskikh vidakh roda Cicerbita," in: Zametki po sistematike i geographii rastenii, v. 13, pp. 85–92. [in Georgian]
- Schchian, A. S. (1953), "Novye vidy Kavkazskoi flory," in: Zametki po sistematike i geografii rastenii, v. 17, pp. 111–118. [in Georgian]
- Schchian, A. S. (1951). "Novye vidy roda Scabiosa iz Gruzii," in: Zametke po sistematike i geografii rastenii, v. 16, pp. 89–94. [In Georgian]
- Schchian, A. S. (1953), "Novyi vidy roda Ulmus L. iz Vostochnoi Gruzii," in: Zametki po sistematike i geografii rastenii, v. 17, pp. 77–83. [In Georgian]
- Schchian, A. S. (1949), "Obzor kavkazskikh predstavitelei roda Sonchus L.," in Zametki po sistematike i geografii rastenii, v. 15, pp. 61–74.
- Schchian, A. S. (1946), "Sistematika i geografiia kavkazskikh vidov Musari Mill," in: Trudy Tbilisskogo botanicheskogo instituta, v. 10, pp. 203–235. [in English]
