= Vilnis (given name) =

Male given name

- Gender: Male
- Name day: 29 April

Origin
- Region of origin: Latvia

Vilnis is a Latvian masculine given name. Individuals bearing the name Vilnis include:

- Vilnis Edvīns Bresis (1938–2017) Latvian politician
- Vilnis Ezeriņš (born 1944), Latvian-born American football player
- Vilnis Straume (born 1937), Latvian footballer
