= Vadim Salmanov =

Soviet composer

Vadim Salmanov Вадим Салманов
- Born: 1912; Saint Petersburg, Soviet Russia
- Died: 1978
- Genres: Classical music
- Occupation(s): Composer, pedagogue

Vadim Nikolayevich Salmanov (4 November 1912, in Saint Petersburg – 27 February 1978, in Leningrad) was a Soviet composer and pedagogue.

Salmanov learned to play the piano as a child from his father who was a professional metallurgical engineer. Exposed to composers from the Baroque, Classical, and Romantic periods, Salmanov quickly grew fond of music and was quickly enrolled in music theory courses at the age of six. However, following the passing Salmanov's father, he went to work at a factory and soon became interested in the topic of hydrogeology.

At 18, he was about to attend the Leningrad Conservatory when he decided to study hydrogeology instead, eventually working as a geologist until 1935 when he finally decided to attend the Conservatory where he studied composition with Mikhail Gnesin following his attendance at a piano concert by Soviet pianist Emil Gilels. After graduating, he worked as a composer until the onset of World War II, when he enlisted in the Soviet Army and served from 1941 to 1945. After the war, he returned to his pedagogical work, teaching at the Leningrad Conservatory from 1946 to 1951, as well as creative work and began to set poems by Blok and Yesenin relating to the war. Later on in his life, Salmanov set poems by Federico García Lorca and Pablo Neruda as well as by Soviet poets.

Salmanov's Symphony No. 1 in D minor was written in 1952 and dedicated to the conductor Yevgeny Mravinsky, who would go on to record all of four of Salmanov's symphonies. The work uses Slavic folk melodies and a motto theme heard at the beginning of the first movement recurs in the Finale. His Symphony No. 4 was likewise dedicated to Mravinsky.

He also taught at the Leningrad Conservatory, his alma mater.

== Awards ==
- Honored Artist of the RSFSR (1962)
- People's Artist of the RSFSR (1972)

== Compositions ==
Aside from symphonies, Salmanov's compositions also include six string quartets (1945–71) and two violin concertos (1964, 1974), among other forms.

=== Symphonic works ===
- Forest, symphonic poem (1948)
- Symphony no. 1 (1952, dedicated to Yevgeny Mravinsky)
- Symphony no. 2 (1959)
- Children's Symphony (1962)
- Symphony no. 3 (1963)
- Symphony no. 4 (1976, dedicated to Yevgeny Mravinsky)

=== Ballet ===
- Man (1968)

=== Oratorio ===
- The Twelve (1958)

=== Orchestral Works ===
- Russian Capriccio (1950)
- "Slavic round dance" (1954)
- Poetic Pictures, symphonic suite after Andersen (1955)
- "Welcome Ode" (1961)
- Violin Concerto No. 1 (1964)
- Big City Nights for violin and chamber orchestra (1969)
- "Cheering" (1972)
- Violin Concerto No. 2 (1974)

=== Chamber instrumental compositions ===
- Six string quartets (1945, 1958, 1961, 1963, 1968, 1971)
- Two Sonatas for Violin and Piano (1945, 1962)
- Two trios (1946, 1949)
- Piano Quartet (1947)
- Sonata for cello and piano (1963)
- Monologue for cello and piano (1970, orchestrated 1972)
