= Shmavon Mangasarov =

Shmavon G. Mangasarov (1 August 1907–1992) was a Soviet artist of Armenian ethnicity. He was one of the founders and members of the Azerbaijan Society of Revolutionary Art Workers. He was also a member of the "USSR Union of Artists" and was named the "Honored Artist of Azerbaijan"

== Exhibitions ==
=== During life ===
- 1928 - 1st Exhibition of Young Artists Organizations of Azerbaijan in Baku
- 1930 - 1st Exhibition of Azerbaijan Revolutionary Art Workers Association (AZORRIIS)
- 1931 - Exhibition of Artists of Ukraine, Azerbaijan, Armenia (Moscow)
- 1932 - The Soviet revolution art in Philadelphia
- 1940 - Art Exhibition, a visit to the 20th anniversary of the establishment of Soviet power in Azerbaijan (Baku)
- 1946 - Exhibition of painters-veterans of World War II in Baku
- 1947 - National Art Exhibition of Azerbaijani artists dedicated to the 30th anniversary of the Great October Socialist Revolution in Baku
- 1949 - Exhibition of new works of artists of the Republic in Baku
- 1954 - Republican Art Exhibition of 1954 in Baku
- 1954 - Exhibition of Artists of the Azerbaijan SSR and Armenian SSR (Moscow) Georgian SSR, Azerbaijan SSR И Armenian SSR (Москва)
- 1955 - Republican Art Exhibition of 1955 in Baku
- 1957 - Republican Art Exhibition dedicated to the 40th anniversary of the Great October Socialist Revolution in Baku

=== Posthumous ===
- 2001 - Artists of Azerbaijan on the Volga
- 2006 - Palette of Friends. Artists of Transcaucasia in Saratov House of National Artist Lev Gorelik (Moscow Russian Academy of Arts)
- 2009 - Caucasus to visit us, from the collection of National Artist of Russia Lev G. Gorelik
- 2012 - Caucasian Dictionary: Land and People, Tsaritsyno Park Museum

=== Works in the collections ===
- The State Tretyakov Gallery
- State Museum of Oriental Art
