= Semyon Mandel =

Soviet/Russian artist

Semyon Solomonovich Mandel (Russian: Семен Соломонович Мандель, 27 October 1907 – 19 September 1974) was a Soviet/Russian theatre and film production designer and art director. He was named an Honored Art Worker of the USSR in 1969, and received the USSR State Prize in 1948.

Mandel worked extensively as a scenic and costume designer for stage, film, musical theatres, city festivals, Music-Halls (was one of the founders), circus shows and other reforming arts venues in Moscow, Leningrad (now St. Petersburg) and Kiev, Ukraine. He designed costumes for such famous actors as Arkadii Raikin, Leonid Utyosov, Klavdia Shulzhenko, Eddy Pozner. Circus masters such as Yuri Nikulin, Oleg Popov, Vyatkin used his ideas for their costumes. Semyon Mandel was the creator of the first signature costumes for the worldwide famous dance troupe “Beryozka”.

During the long stretch of his 50-year creative career, Semyon Mandel designed 39 films (scenery and costumes) and more than 250 theatre productions and musicals. Among the most known movies are: “Musical story” (Musykalnaja istoriya),” “Anton Ivanovich Serditsja”, “ Carrier Varyag” (Kreiser Varyag)”, “Russian Question” (Russkii Vopros), “Marriage” (Svad’ba) and many others that went into the golden collection of Russian cinema fund. He later worked in practically all theatres of Leningrad.

Georgy Tovstonogov once wrote about Mandel in Russian: "His fantasy was enormous and highly imaginative and his creative mind knew no borders. The artist never took the beaten path in finding a unique theatrical solution for a certain play or film; he was highly resourceful in implementing the newest theatrical techniques, materials and lighting available at the time. For him, nothing was impossible in the search to achieve the best theatrical vision for the production."

Mandel was also known for his creation of theatrical posters that were seen throughout the city.

== Biography ==
=== Early years ===
Semyon Mandel was born on 27 October 1907 in the small town of Zmerinka, Vinnitza district in Ukraine. His father, Solomon Mandel, was a confectioner; his mother a housewife. He also had an older brother named Ilya, born in 1905, who later became a sound engineer at the film studio Lenfilm.

In 1920, the family moved to Vinnitza, where Semyon Mandel attended a vocational school and later, in 1923, entered the electromechanical college. At that time he developed an interest in painting and theater design. He started to take lessons at the Vinnitza State Theatre School. His first work was to design sets and costumes for the local ballet “Konek Gorbunok” at the age of 16.

=== Kiev and Moscow ===
In 1925, he entered The Kiev State Arts Institute, where he first started in the sculpture department, then switched to the Fine Art department and finally graduated in 1931 with a diploma for Film and Stage Design. His design professor at school was the famous Vladimir Tatlin - one of the most important figures in the Russian avant-garde art movement of the 1920s and later, the most important artist in the Constructivist movement. Mandel was very much influenced by Tatlin’s method of the linear composition of the stage space and color juxtapositions. Tatlin taught future designers the art of creating stage models and how to widely use various textures. Fine Arts at the Kiev State Arts Institute was led by Fodor Krichevskii, who implemented the broad picturesque manner of painting, large forms and emotionally intense colors. After graduation, Semyon Mandel chose cinema arts and joined the Kiev Film Studio.

In 1927, he met his future wife Ludmila Putievskaja and married her in 1932. In 1933, the family moved to Leningrad and, in 1935, his first daughter Tatiana was born. The couple later divorced.

During the 1930s, the artist worked extensively for film and stage. The most noted stage productions were created for the newly emerged Leningrad Music-Hall –“The skylarks” ( Nebesnue Lastochki) in 1934 and “Poputnui Veter” in 1937. He desired thirteen films during that time period. Mandel was the great collaborator and interpreter of the play script while working with the production director. His input created unique visual images for the shows.

=== World War II ===
During the Second World War of 1940–1945, the artist joined the military and worked at the Army Front Headquarters newspaper making antiwar propaganda posters and leaflets in Leningrad and Moscow. Theatre productions designed at that difficult time were “The Front” and “Russian People”, among others. At a time of material shortages, Mandel inventively created the sets out of the discarded zeppelins. During that time, he also designed scenery and costumes for five movies; the most noted of them was “Svad’ba”, “Musical story” and “Anton Ivanovich Serditsja” – all of which went into the golden collection of Russian cinema fund.

=== Leningrad period ===
In 1946, the artist moved permanently to Leningrad and decided to dedicate his work mostly to theatre. Leningrad was the place where his noted stage designs were created and where the artist worked until his death in 1974. In 1949, he married Marianna Safonova, at the time the star of the Leningrad Theatre of the Musical Comedy. Their daughter Alisa Mandel was born in 1956. Mandel’s daughter later became a theatrical costume designer. In 1990, Alisa moved from Russia to the United States, where she lives in Washington, D.C. and designs costumes for theatre and dance, continuing her father’s footsteps. It is hard to name the best theatre productions designed by Semyon Mandel during his tenure in Leningrad. All theatrical city posters carried the name of designer Semyon Mandel. In Leningrad, his work was seen on stages of BDT (Bolshoi Dramateshcki Teatr), Theatre of Leninskii Komsomol, Kirov Opera and Ballet Theatre, Pushkin Drama Theatre, Theatre Lensoveta, Musical Comedy Theatre, State Circus and others.

He worked with such prominent theatre directors as Georgy Tovstonogov, with whom he created more than 15 productions. Additionally, he worked with Sergei Gerasimov, Igor Vladimirov, Sergei Jurskii. It is impossible to imagine a theatrical Leningrad of the 1950s, 1960s and early 1970s without the name of Semyon Somonovich Mandel. In 1952, he became the resident designer of the “Leningrad Thearte Lencom”; in parallel he worked with Arkadyi Raikin, with whom he created 3 programs for “Theatre of Miniatures”. He was a creator of three productions for “Leningrad Music Hall’ in 1967, 1972 and 1974 and one for “Moscow Music hall” in 1973.

Designing for Music Hall became the creative breeding ground for the artist, where he was able to utilize his talent in creating special effects in lighting, in moving and transforming scenery and costumes.

=== Death ===
Semyon Mandel suffered from coronary deficiency and had heart disease. He died during his second heart attack in 1974 while working on the Music Hall production of “From Heart to Heart”.

== See also ==
- Cinema of the Soviet Union
- Lists of Soviet films
