= Abschwangen massacre =

1914 Russian massacre of German civilians in East Prussia

Abschwangen Massacre
- Part of World War I
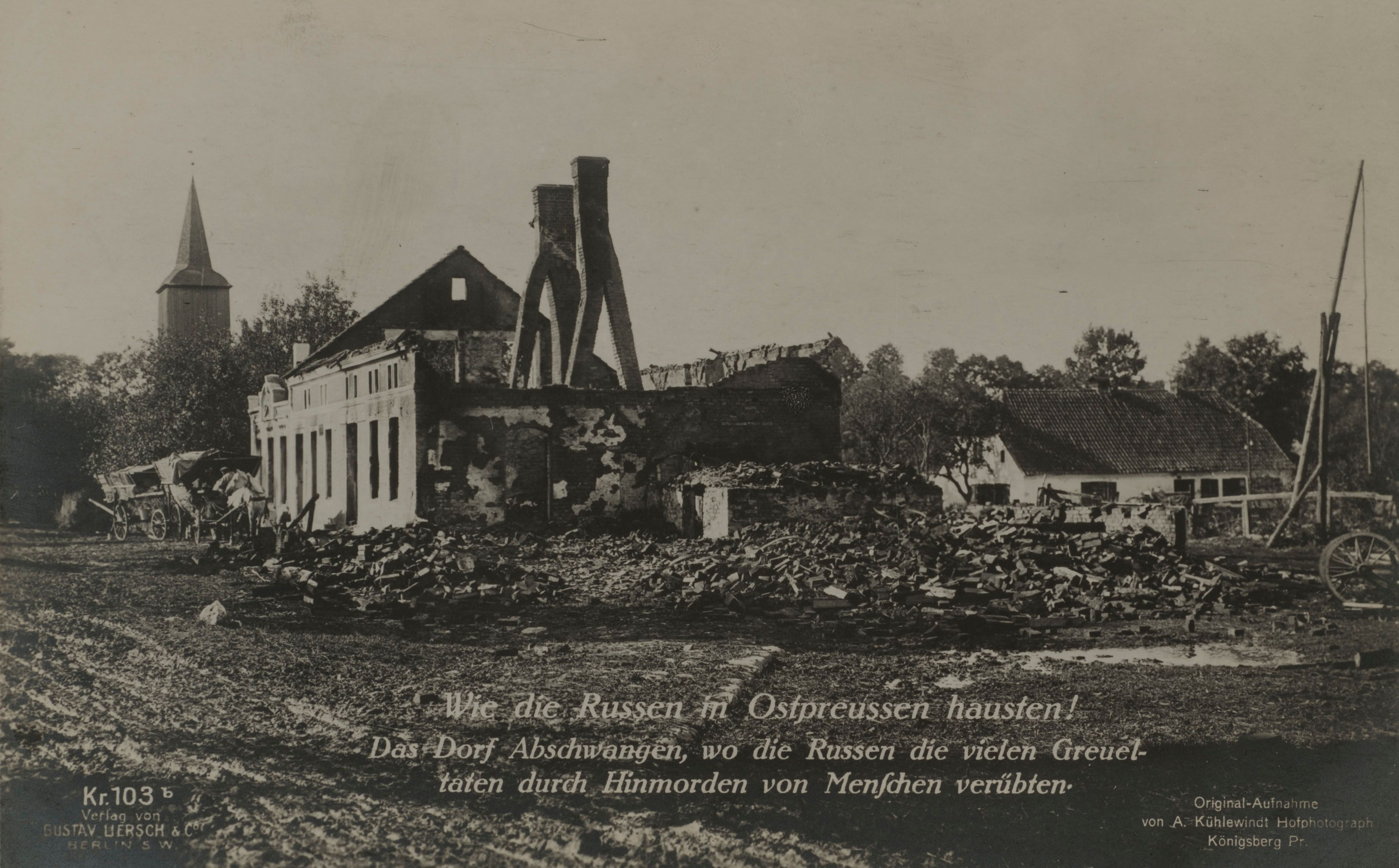
- Location: 54.4996°N 20.7613°E; Abschwangen (Tishino)
- Date: 29 August 1914
- Target: German civilians in Prussia
- Attack type: Massacre
- Deaths: 65
- Perpetrator: Imperial Russian Army
- Motive: Reprisal against civilians for killing of aristocrat officer in battle

The Abschwangen massacre was a massacre committed by Russian troops during World War I on 29 August 1914 in the occupied village of Abschwangen (now Tishino) near Preussisch Eylau some 30 km (19 mi) south of Königsberg, in which 65 German civilians, including 28 locals and 37 refugees from other places, were killed.

== Prelude ==
After Russian troops started their first World War I offensive in East Prussia in August 1914, they reached the small village of Abschwangen on August 27, 1914, without struggle, and marched through. On August 29, 1914, an Imperial German Army reconnaissance unit of four cavalrymen came into the unoccupied village and confronted an Imperial Russian Army motorcar and opened fire. During the ensuing firefight, a single Russian officer, a member of the wealthy and powerful Trubetskoy family of the Russian nobility, was killed, and the car returned to the village of Almenhausen (now Kashtanovo), some 5 km (3.1 mi) east of Abschwangen.

== The massacre ==
After the return of the car to Almenhausen, the Russian troops executed nine civilians (Mayor Herman Prang, Farmer Stadie, Hermann Marienberg and six unknown refugees), who were by chance standing next to them and burned down 70 buildings out of 81 existing houses. At the same time some other troops marched to Abschwangen, where they started to execute the male inhabitants and burned down houses and farm buildings. In Abschwangen 78 buildings out of 101 existing were destroyed. During the massacre, 65 people (28 locals, 37 refugees from southern East Prussia) were killed:

- from Abschwangen: Brüderlein, Fritz; Dombrowski, Fritz; Dunkel, Franz; Eggert, Johanna; Freimuth, Karl; Friedel, Walter; Frisch, Hermann; Gendatis, Franz; Großmann, August; Heinrich, Richard; Hochwald, Albert; Judel, Lina; Kemmer, Julius; Kösling, Friedrich; Krause, Ernst; Küßner, Karl; Lange, Christoph; Naujoks, Friedrich; Oppermann, Albert; Packheiser, Gustav; Regotzki, Karl; Riemann, August; Riemann, Franz; Riemann, Karl; Rosenbaum, Franz; Schröder, Friedrich; Waschkau, Gottfried; Witt, Elisabeth;
- from Allenau: Burblies, Gustav; Hinz, Friedrich; Hinz, Karl; Reimer, Albert;
- from Bönkeim: Barteleit, Johanna;
- from Böttchersdorf: Gawlick, Richard; Gawlick, Rudolf; Hensel, Franz;
- from Budweitschen: Schippel, Wilhelm; Willuhn, Karl;
- from Darkehmen: Forstreuter, Karl;
- from Dettmitten: Arndt, Franz; Arndt, Wilhelm; Arnswald, Otto; Ewert, Friedrich; Grube, Richard; Mischke, Friedrich; Naujok, Gustav; Petschkuhn, Karl; Petschkuhn, Otto;
- from Dommelkeim: Nelson, Emil;
- from Korschen: Diester, Ewald;
- from Kortmedien: Görke, Ernst; Holz, Ernst; Motzkau, Gustav; Saul, Gustav; Schirrmacher, Johann; Schoen, Gustav;
- from Langendorf: Czibold, Fritz; Dudda, Michael; Marwinski, Paul; Rogowski, Christian; Wicesanski, Michael;
- from Löwenhagen: Hollstein, Leopold;
- from Schlangen: Marquardt, Bernhard
- one Unidentified;

== Aftermath ==
Due to the German success at the Battle of Tannenberg, Russian troops retreated from the Abschwangen region, and the village was recaptured without a struggle by German troops on September 3, 1914. A memorial was built to the 74 killed civilians in 1924, but it, like the whole village, was destroyed during World War II in 1945.
