= Leonid Ivanov (footballer) =

Soviet footballer

Leonid Ivanov (football player)
Personal information
- Full name: Leonid Grigoryevich Ivanov
- Date of birth: 25 July 1921
- Place of birth: Petrograd, Russian SFSR
- Date of death: 14 September 1990 (aged 69)
- Place of death: Leningrad, USSR
- Height: 1.76 m (5 ft 9 in)
- Position: Goalkeeper

Youth career
- Elektrik Plant Leningrad

Senior career*
Years	Team	Apps	(Gls)
1939	Stalinets Leningrad	14	(0)
1940–1956	Zenit Leningrad	294	(0)

International career
1952	USSR	3	(0)

Managerial career
- FC Onezhets Petrozavodsk
- GOMZ Leningrad
- * Club domestic league appearances and goals

Leonid Grigoryevich Ivanov (Russian: Леонид Григорьевич Иванов) (25 July 1921 in Petrograd – 14 September 1990 in Leningrad) was a Soviet football player.

== Honours ==
- Soviet Cup winner: 1944.

== International career ==
Ivanov made his debut for USSR on 15 July 1952 in an Olympics game against Bulgaria. He allowed 5 goals in his next game against Yugoslavia (5:5), 3 more in a replay against Yugoslavia and never played for the national team again.
