= 1908 in Russia =

- Decades: 1880s; 1890s; 1900s; 1910s; 1920s
- See also: History of Russia; Timeline of Russian history; List of years in Russia

Events from the year 1908 in Russia.

== Incumbents ==
- Monarch – Nicholas II
- Chairman of the Council of Ministers – Pyotr Arkadyevich Stolypin

== Events ==
- 1908 World Figure Skating Championships
- Bezdany raid
- 1908 bombardment of the Majlis
- Russian Empire at the 1908 Summer Olympics
- Tunguska event

== Births ==
- 22 January – Lev Landau, physicist, Nobel Prize laureate (died 1968)
- 30 May – Marina Semyonova, ballerina (died 2010)
- 20 June – Vasily Larin, Soviet general (died 1957)
- 3 September – Lev Pontryagin, mathematician (died 1988)
- 18 September – Viktor Ambartsumian, Soviet Armenian scientist (died 1996)
- 30 September – David Oistrakh, Ukrainian violinist (died 1974)
- 23 October – Ilya Frank, physicist, Nobel Prize laureate (died 1990)
- 30 October – Dmitriy Ustinov, Soviet Army officer, Minister of Defense (died 1984)
