= Ralf Liivar =

Estonian footballer

Personal information
- Date of birth: 2 April 1903
- Place of birth: Tallinn, Estonia
- Date of death: 14 June 1990 (aged 87)
- Place of death: Tallinn, Estonia

International career
Years	Team	Apps	(Gls)
1924–1927	Estonia	13	(0)

Ralf Liivar (2 April 1903 – 14 June 1990) was an Estonian footballer. He played in thirteen matches for the Estonia national football team between 1924 and 1927. Liivar was part of the Estonian team at the 1924 Summer Olympics in Paris.
