= 1910 in Russia =

- Decades: 1890s; 1900s; 1910s; 1920s; 1930s
- See also: History of Russia; Timeline of Russian history; List of years in Russia

The following lists events that happened during 1910 in the Russian Empire.

== Incumbents ==
- Monarch – Nicholas II
- Chairman of the Council of Ministers – Pyotr Arkadyevich Stolypin

== Events ==
- 31 January – foundation of the All-Russian National Union, a moderate conservative party.
- 17 June – Khodynka Aerodrome founded.
- 15 October – Manchurian plague outbreak in the Russian Far East.
- 21 November – Sevastopol Aviation Officers School founded.

== Births ==
- 23 February – Nina Tikhonova, ballet dancer and teacher (died 1995).
- 27 February – Genrikh Kasparyan, Armenian chess player and chess problem composer (died 1995)
- 21 June – Alexander Tvardovsky, writer (died 1971).
- 23 June – Lydia Delectorskaya, model (died 1998)
- 23 July – Pimen (Izvekov), 14th Patriarch of Moscow and all Rus' (1971–1990) (died 1990).
- 5 December – Mikhail Semichastny, football player

== Deaths ==
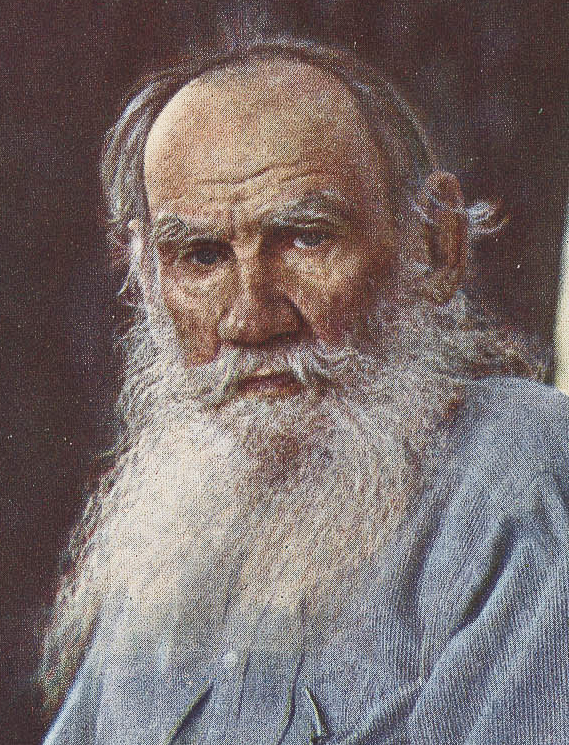
Leo Tolstoy in 1908

- 14 April – Mikhail Vrubel, painter (b. 1856).
- 29 May – Mily Balakirev, composer (b. 1837).
- 24 July – Arkhip Kuindzhi, painter (b. 1841).
- 20 November – Leo Tolstoy, writer and philosopher (b. 1828).
- Maria Golitzyna, noble, courtier and philanthropist (b. 1834)
