= Ivan Knunyants =

Soviet chemist

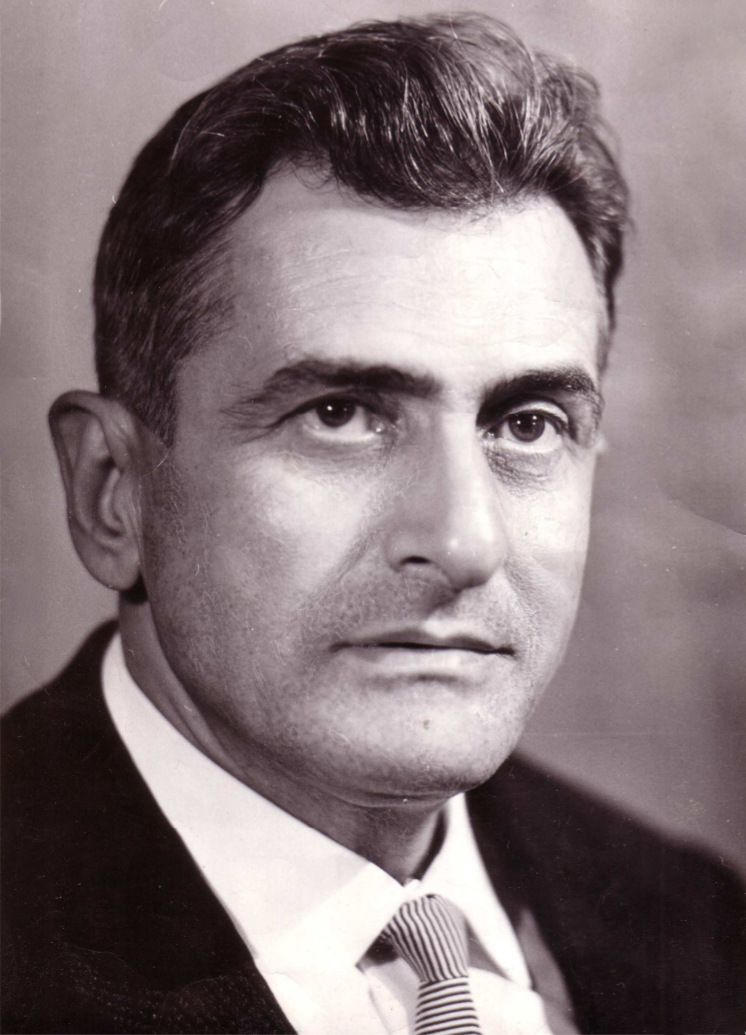
- Born: Ivan Lyudvigovich Knunyants; June 4, 1906; Shusha, Elizavetpol Governorate, Caucasus Viceroyalty, Russian Empire
- Died: December 21, 1990 (aged 84); Moscow, Russian SFSR, Soviet Union
- Known for: One of major developers of Soviet chemical weapons program
- Awards: Hero of Socialist Labour (1966)
- Scientific career
- Fields: Chemistry

Ivan Lyudvigovich Knunyants (Armenian: Իվան Կնունյանց, Russian: Иван Людвигович Кнунянц; 4 June [O.S. 22 May] 1906 – 21 December 1990), was a Soviet chemist of Armenian origin, academician of the Academy of Sciences of the Soviet Union, a major general and engineer, who significantly contributed to the advancement of Soviet chemistry. He made more than 200 inventions, many of which used in the Soviet industry.

Graduated from Moscow Bauman Highest Technical School (MVTU) 1928, student of Aleksei Chichibabin. Leader of laboratory for elementooranic chemistry.

He was one of the pioneers of the synthesis of poly-caprolactam (capron, nylon-6, polyamide-6), founder of Soviet school of fluorocarbon's chemistry, one of major developers of Soviet chemical weapons program, also an author of a few drugs for chemotherapy of cancer.

He proposed the method of getting the 5-hydroxypentan-2-one from ethyl ethanoate and oxirane, also used in the industrial synthesis of vitamin B. His scientific group synthesized compounds containing fluorine, along with nitro-, amino-hydroxy-isoquinoline-air and other groups.

== Awards ==
- Hero of Socialist Labour (1966)
- Order of Lenin (1966)
- Lenin Prize (1972)
- Three Stalin Prizes (1943, 1948 and 1950)
- Order of the October Revolution
- Order of the Red Banner
- Order of the Red Banner of Labour
- Order of the Red Star

== See also ==
- List of Russian inventors
