= Friedrich Breitfuss =

Russian philatelist

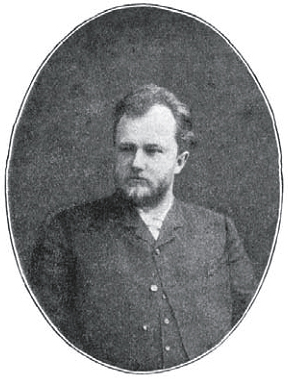
Friedrich Breitfuss (pre-1911)

Friedrich Andreas Breitfuss (16 September 1851 – 7 September 1911) was a philatelist from the Russian Empire who entered on the Roll of Distinguished Philatelists in 1921, ten years after he died.

During 1874 Breitfuss attended meetings of the London Philatelic Society, later to become the Royal Philatelic Society London, and became a corresponding member in 1875 as he was not able to attend the meetings of the Society after he left the United Kingdom.

Stanley Gibbons Monthly Journal reported that Breitfuss started to collect stamps as a schoolboy in about 1865. He moved to London in December 1873 and in 1874 he met Dr. Charles Viner who introduced him to the London Philatelic Society. In 1875, he moved to Odessa and in 1877 he returned home to St. Petersburg. He continued to buy numerous stamp collections along the way including those of Prince Galitzin-Ostermann, for which he paid £1500 in 1887, and in 1898 the collection of his friend Mr. Theodor Notthafft, director of the St. Petersburg International Bank, the Russo-Chinese Bank and of the Russian-Corean Bank.

Breitfuss continued to collect widely throughout his life but was a particular expert on the stamps of the Zemstvo posts, Russia and Finland generally and South America.

He died on 7 September 1911 at Karlsbad.
