= Soğanlı railway station =

Railway station in Kars, Turkey

Soğanlı

General information
- Coordinates: 40.163711°N 42.253644°E
- System: TCDD
- Owner: TCDD
- Platforms: 1
- Tracks: 1

Construction
- Structure type: At-grade

Other information
- Status: In Operation

History
- Opened: 1913
- Rebuilt: 1962
Location

Soğanlı railway station is a freight station near the village of Soğanlı in the Kars Province of Turkey.
