= Vilnis (Riga newspaper) =

Latvian newspaper

Vilnis ('The Wave') was a Lithuanian-language Bolshevik newspaper published from Riga 1913-1914 (weekly) and in 1917, issued by a group of Lithuanian socialists residing there. Vilnis was brought from Riga for distribution inside Lithuania.
