= 1937 in the Soviet Union =

- Decades: 1920s; 1930s; 1940s; 1950s
- See also: History of the Soviet Union; List of years in the Soviet Union

The following lists events that happened during 1937 in the Union of Soviet Socialist Republics.

== Incumbents ==
- General Secretary of the Communist Party of the Soviet Union — Joseph Stalin
- Chairman of the Central Executive Committee of the Congress of Soviets — Mikhail Kalinin
- Chairman of the Council of People's Commissars of the Soviet Union — Vyacheslav Molotov

== Events ==
- 23–30 January — Trial of the Anti-Soviet Trotskyist Center
- June — Case of Trotskyist Anti-Soviet Military Organization
- 18–20 June — The first transpolar flight and the first non-stop USSR-USA flight by the crew led by Valery Chkalov
- 12–14 July — A world-record non-stop flight, by the crew led by Mikhail Gromov, from Moscow to San Jacinto, California
- 12 December — Soviet Union legislative election, 1937

== Films ==
- Bezhin Meadow — directed by Sergei Eisenstein
- Lullaby — directed by Dziga Vertov
- The Return of Maxim — directed by Grigori Kozintsev and Leonid Trauberg
- Without Dowry — directed by Yakov Protazanov

== Births ==
- 2 January — Marietta Chudakova, Soviet and Russian literary critic (d. 2021)
- 12 January — Mikheil Meskhi, footballer (d. 1991)
- 20 January — Mintimer Shaimiev, 1st Head of Tatarstan
- 30 January — Boris Spassky, Soviet and Russian chess grandmaster
- 16 February — Yuri Manin, mathematician (d. 2023)
- 19 February — Boris Pugo, 9th Minister of Interior of the Soviet Union (d. 1991)
- 25 February — Yegor Stroyev, 2nd Chairman of the Federation Council
- 28 February — Vitaly Tulenev, Soviet and Russian painter, visual artist and art teacher (d. 1997)
- 4 March — Yuri Senkevich, Soviet and Russian physician and scientist (d. 2003)
- 6 March — Valentina Tereshkova, Soviet and Russian cosmonaut
- 15 March — Valentin Rasputin, Soviet and Russian writer (d. 2015)
- 16 March — Valentina Parshina, agronomist and politician (d. 2020)
- 18 March — Aleksei Zasukhin, Soviet and Russian boxer (d. 1996)
- 23 March — Boris Zaytsev, Soviet and Russian ice hockey goaltender (d. 2000)
- 2 April — Yuri Falin, Soviet and Russian football player (d. 2003)
- 9 April — Leonid Barbier, Soviet and Ukrainian swimmer (d. 2023)
- 10 April — Bella Akhmadulina, Soviet and Russian poet (d. 2010)
- 13 April — Osman Mirzayev, Head of Presidential Administration of Azerbaijan (d. 1991)
- 14 April — Anatoly Lysenko, television figure, journalist, director and producer (d. 2021)
- 24 April — Galina Semenova, Soviet and Russian politician (d. 2017)
- 27 April — Olga Bondareva, mathematician and economist (d. 1991)
- 29 April — Yevgeny Feofanov, boxer (d. 2000)
- 1 May — Hazret Sovmen, 2nd Head of the Republic of Adygea
- 7 May — Sergey Ling, 3rd Prime Minister of Belarus
- 10 May — Vadim Rogovin, Soviet and Russian Trotskyist historian and sociologist (d. 1998)
- 30 May — Aleksandr Demyanenko, actor (d. 1999)
- 12 June — Vladimir Arnold, mathematician (d. 2010)
- 18 June — Vitaly Zholobov, Soviet and Ukrainian cosmonaut
- 2 July — Oleg Shenin, politician (d. 2009)
- 6 July — Vladimir Ashkenazy, Soviet and Russian pianist
- 7 July — Valery Anisimov, wrestler
- 8 July — Lidia Klement, singer (d. 1964)
- 21 July — Eduard Streltsov, footballer (d. 1990)
- 24 July — Valentina Dorofeeva, industrialist (d. 2018)
- 10 August — Anatoly Sobchak, Mayor of Saint Petersburg (d. 2000)
- 20 August — Uzakbay Karamanov, last Chairman of the Council of Ministers of the Kazakh SSR (d. 2017)
- 26 August — Gennady Yanayev, Vice President of the Soviet Union (d. 2010)
- 6 September — Gennady Shpalikov, poet, screenwriter and film director (d. 1974)
- 13 September — Igor Ivanov, Acting Head of Karachay-Cherkessia (d. 2000)
- 16 September — Valentina Dimitrieva, Soviet and Russian farm worker (d. 2019)
- 20 September — Valentin Knysh, politician (d. 2022)
- 23 September — Aleksandr Medakin, Soviet and Russian football player (d. 1993)
- 24 September — Umyar Mavlikhanov, Soviet and Russian fencer (d. 1999)
- 26 September — Valentin Pavlov, 11th Premier of the Soviet Union (d. 2003)
- 28 September — Georgy Rerberg, Soviet and Russian cinematographer (d. 1999)
- 30 September
  - Yuri Maslyukov, Soviet and Russian politician (d. 2010)
  - Vitaliy Boiko, Soviet and Ukrainian lawyer and diplomat (d. 2020)
- 3 October — Aleksandr Kondratov, Soviet and Russian linguist, biologist, journalist and poet (d. 1993)
- 8 October — Eduard Rossel, 1st Governor of Sverdlovsk Oblast
- 27 October — Victor Popov, Soviet and Russian theoretical physicist (d. 1994)
- 6 November — Vadim Bakatin, 8th Chairman of the Committee for State Security (d. 2022)
- 12 November — Alexey Obukhov, Russian diplomat and politician (d. 2022)
- 13 November — Mikhail Nikolayev, 1st Head of the Sakha Republic (d. 2023)
- 22 November — Nikolai Kapustin, Soviet and Russian composer and pianist (d. 2020)
- 25 November — Serikbolsyn Abdildin, 1st Chairman of the Supreme Council of Kazakhstan (d. 2019)
- 26 November — Boris Yegorov, Soviet and Russian physician and cosmonaut (d. 1994)
- 29 November — Ali Aliyev, Soviet and Russian freestyle wrestler (d. 1995)
- 7 December — Simon Gindikin, Russian mathematician
- 24 December — Viacheslav Chornovil, Soviet dissident and Ukrainian politician (d. 1999)

== Deaths ==
- 10 January — Martemyan Ryutin, Marxist activist, Bolshevik revolutionary and a political functionary of the Russian Communist Party (b. 1890)
- 16 January — Pyotr Bark, banker and government official during the Imperial Russia era (b. 1869)
- 30 January
  - Georgy Pyatakov, 1st First Secretary of the Communist Party of Ukraine (b. 1890)
  - Nikolay Muralov, Bolshevik revolutionary leader and military commander (b. 1877)
- 18 February — Grigory Ordzhonikidze, member of the Old Bolsheviks and statesman (b. 1886)
- 24 February — Vladimir Lipsky, scientist and botanist (b. 1863)
- 8 March — Yuriy Kotsiubynsky, politician and activist (b. 1896)
- 22 March — Vladimir Maksimov, stage and silent film actor (b. 1880)
- 29 March — Feodor Koenemann, pianist, composer and music teacher (b. 1873)
- 13 April — Ilya Ilf, journalist and writer (b. 1897)
- 31 May
  - Yan Gamarnik, 10th First Secretary of the Communist Party of Byelorussia (b. 1894)
  - Nikolai Uglanov, 9th First Secretary of the Moscow City Committee of the Communist Party of the Soviet Union (b. 1886)
- 4 June — Keke Geladze, mother of Joseph Stalin (b. 1858)
- 12 June
  - Mikhail Tukhachevsky, prominent general (b. 1893)
  - Ieronim Uborevich, military commander (b. 1896)
  - Iona Yakir, army commander (b. 1896)
  - Vitovt Putna, Red Army officer (b. 1893)
  - Vitaly Primakov, revolutionary, military leader and commander of the Red Cossacks (b. 1897)
  - Robert Eideman, komkor, writer and poet (b. 1895)
  - Maria Ulyanova, revolutionary, politician and younger sister of Vladimir Lenin (b. 1878)
- 16 June — Alexander Chervyakov, politician, revolutionary and founding member of the Communist Party of Byelorussia (b. 1892)
- 27 June — Sandro Akhmeteli, theater director (b. 1886)
- 1 July
  - Ilya Garkavy, komkor and organizer of the Red Guards detachments in Tiraspol (b. 1888)
  - Matvei Vasilenko, komkor (b. 1888)
- 3 July — Boris Gorbachyov, komkor (b. 1892)
- 13 July
  - Mikhail Alafusov, general (b. 1891)
  - Mykhailo Boychuk, monumentalist and modernist painter (b. 1882)
- 16 July — Vladimir Kirillov, poet (b. 1889)
- 18 July — Grigol Giorgadze, historian, jurist and politician (b. 1879)
- 22 July — Paolo Iashvili, poet and one of the leading members of the Georgian symbolist movement (b. 1894)
- 13 August — Sigizmund Levanevsky, pioneer of long-range flight (b. 1902)
- 19 August
  - Alexander Hotovitzky, Russian Orthodox priest and missionary (b. 1872)
  - Ivan Kataev, novelist, short story writer and journalist (b. 1902)
- 9 September — Mikhail Diterikhs, general in the Imperial Russian Army and key figure in the White movement (b. 1874)
- 20 September — Lev Karakhan, revolutionary and diplomat (b. 1889)
- 27 September — Alikhan Bukeikhanov, politician, statesman and journalist (b. 1866)
- 10 October — Peter of Krutitsy, Russian Orthodox priest and metropolitan (b. 1862)
- 23 October — Nikolai Klyuev, poet (b. 1884)
- 30 October
  - Avel Enukidze, member of the Old Bolsheviks (b. 1877)
  - Ivan Zhukov, politician and statesman (b. 1889)
  - Mendel Khatayevich, politician and one of the main organizers of Collectivization in the Ukrainian Soviet Socialist Republic (b. 1893)
- 10 November — Nikolai Batalov, stage and film actor (b. 1899)
- 20 November — Joseph Petrovykh, bishop of the Russian Orthodox Church and spiritual writer (b. 1872)
- 25 November — Aleksandr Glagolev, Russian Orthodox priest (b. 1872)
- 26 November — Leonid Veyner, general (b. 1897)
- 27 November
  - Vsevolod Balitsky, official (b. 1892)
  - Vasyl Lypkivsky, Russian Orthodox priest and metropolitan (b. 1864)
- 28 November — Ernest Appoga, general and revolutionary (b. 1898)
- 8 December — Ahmet Baitursynuly, intellectual (b. 1872)
- 16 December — Giorgi Mazniashvili, general and military leader of the Democratic Republic of Georgia (b. 1871)
- 21 December — Meliton Balanchivadze, opera singer and composer (b. 1862)

=== Dates unknown ===
- Vassily Ryutin, older son of Martemyan Ryutin (b. 1910)
- Vissarion Ryutin, younger son of Martemyan Ryutin (b. 1913)

== See also ==
- 1937 in fine arts of the Soviet Union
- List of Soviet films of 1937
