= 2000 in Russia =

- Decades: 1980s; 1990s; 2000s; 2010s; 2020s
- See also: History of Russia; Timeline of Russian history; List of years in Russia

The following lists events that happened during 2000 in Russia.

== Incumbents ==
- President: Vladimir Putin (from May 7, acting President until May 7)
- Prime Minister: Vladimir Putin (until May 7), Mikhail Kasyanov (from May 7)

=== Governors ===
- Amur Oblast: Anatoly Belonogov (CPRF)
- Arkhangelsk Oblast: Anatoly Yefremov (Unity)
- Astrakhan Oblast: Anatoly Guzhvin (Unity)
- Belgorod Oblast: Yevgeny Savchenko (OVR)
- Bryansk Oblast: Yury Lodkin (CPRF)
- Chelyabinsk Oblast: Pyotr Sumin (PPUR)
- Irkutsk Oblast: Boris Govorin (OVR)
- Ivanovo Oblast: Vladislav Tikhomirov (Independent, until December 21), Vladimir Tikhonov (CPRF, starting December 21)
- Kaliningrad Oblast: Leonid Gorbenko (Independent, until December 8), Vladimir Yegorov (Independent / Unity ally, starting December 8)
- Kaluga Oblast: Valery Sudarenkov (Independent, until November 18), Anatoly Artamonov (Independent / Unity ally, starting November 18)
- Kemerovo Oblast: Aman Tuleyev (Independent)
- Kirov Oblast: Vladimir Shaklein (Independent)
- Kostroma Oblast: Viktor Shershunov (CPRF)
- Kurgan Oblast: Oleg Bogomolov (Independent)
- Kursk Oblast: Alexander Rutskoy (Derzhava, until November 18), Aleksandr Mikhailov (CPRF, starting November 18)
- Leningrad Oblast: Valery Serdyukov (Independent)
- Lipetsk Oblast: Oleg Korolyov (OVR)
- Magadan Oblast: Valentin Tsvetkov (Independent)
- Moscow Oblast: Anatoly Tyazhlov (NDR, until January 2), Boris Gromov (OVR, starting January 2)
- Murmansk Oblast: Yuri Yevdokimov (OVR)
- Nizhny Novgorod Oblast: Ivan Sklyarov (OVR)
- Novgorod Oblast: Mikhail Prusak (Independent)
- Novosibirsk Oblast: Viktor Tolokonsky (Independent)
- Omsk Oblast: Leonid Polezhayev (Unity)
- Orenburg Oblast: Alexey Chernyshev (APR)
- Oryol Oblast: Yegor Stroyev (Independent)
- Penza Oblast: Vasily Bochkarev (Independent)
- Pskov Oblast: Yevgeny Mikhailov (LDPR)
- Rostov Oblast: Vladimir Chub (OVR)
- Ryazan Oblast: Vyacheslav Lyubimov (CPRF)
- Sakhalin Oblast: Igor Farkhutdinov (Independent)
- Samara Oblast: Konstantin Titov (SPS)
- Saratov Oblast: Dmitry Ayatskov (OVR)
- Smolensk Oblast: Aleksandr Prokhorov (CPRF)
- Tambov Oblast: Oleg Betin (Unity)
- Tomsk Oblast: Viktor Kress (Independent)
- Tula Oblast: Vasily Starodubtsev (CPRF)
- Tver Oblast: Vladimir Platov (Unity)
- Tyumen Oblast: Leonid Roketsky (Independent)
- Ulyanovsk Oblast: Yuri Goryachev (Independent, until December 30), Vladimir Shamanov (Unity, starting December 30)
- Vladimir Oblast: Nikolay Vinogradov (CPRF)
- Volgograd Oblast: Nikolai Maksyuta (CPRF)
- Vologda Oblast: Vyacheslav Pozgalyov (Unity)
- Voronezh Oblast: Ivan Shabanov (Independent, until December 29), Vladimir Kulakov (Independent / Unity ally, starting December 29)
- Yaroslavl Oblast: Anatoly Lisitsyn (OVR)
- Jewish Autonomous Oblast: Nikolay Volkov (Independent)

== Events ==
=== February ===
- February 4 — Second Chechen War: Bombing of Katyr-Yurt.
- February 5 — Second Chechen War: Novye Aldi massacre.
- February 6 — Second Chechen War: Battle of Grozny, Chechen capital Grozny falls to Russian troops.
- February 29–March 1 — Second Chechen War: Battle of Hill 776.

=== March ===
- March — Second Chechen War: Komsomolskoye massacre.
- March 1 — Second Chechen War: Grozny OMON fratricide incident.
- March 4–25 — Second Chechen War: Battle of Komsomolskoye.
- March 26 — Presidential elections: Vladimir Putin is elected president.
- March 29 — Second Chechen War: Zhani-Vedeno ambush.

=== May ===
- May 24 — The Russian Government threatens to bomb the Taliban in Afghanistan due to their support for Chechen rebels.

=== July ===
- July 2–3 — Second Chechen War: Chechen suicide attacks kill 43 Russian soldiers.

=== August ===
- August 12 — The Russian submarine K-141 Kursk sinks in the Barents Sea, resulting in the deaths of all 118 men on board.
- August 14 — Tsar Nicholas II and several members of his family are canonized by the synod of the Russian Orthodox Church.
- August 28 — Moscow's Ostankino Tower set ablaze by fire caused by a short circuit.

=== September ===
- September 15–October 1 — Russia competes at the Summer Olympics in Sydney, Australia, winning 32 gold, 28 silver and 29 bronze medals.

=== December ===
- December 25 — Russia changes their national anthem back to the old Soviet Union anthem, with newer lyrics.

== Notable births ==
- January 1 — Ekaterina Alexandrovskaya, Russian-Australian pair skater (d. 2020)
- January 26 — Angélique Abachkina, ice dancer
- February 9 — Serafima Sakhanovich, figure skater
- April 12 — Maria Sotskova, figure skater
- November 8 — Anastasia Skoptsova, ice dancer

== Notable deaths ==
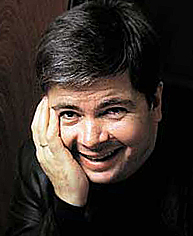
Artyom Borovik

- January 6 — Alexey Vyzmanavin, chess grandmaster (b. 1960)
- January 7 — Makhmud Esambayev, Soviet and Russian actor and dancer (b. 1924)
- January 20 — Izabella Yurieva, singer (b. 1899)
- February 1 — Khunkar-Pasha Israpilov, Chechen separatist (b. 1967)
- February 3 — Yuriy Lituyev, athlete (b. 1925)
- February 9 — Yevgeny Andreyev, Air Force colonel and balloonist (b. 1926)
- February 15 — Vladimir Utkin, engineer and rocket scientist (b. 1923)
- February 20 — Anatoly Sobchak, Mayor of Saint Petersburg (b. 1937)
- February 22 — Arkady Khait, writer, satirist and screenwriter (b. 1938)
- February 23 — Nikolay Gulyayev, football player and coach (b. 1915)
- February 24 — Boris Zaytsev, ice hockey goaltender (b. 1937)
- February 25 — Pyotr Breus, water polo player (b. 1927)
- February 27 — Jurij A. Treguboff, author (b. 1913)
- February 29 — Nikita Moiseyev, mathematician (b. 1917)
- March 9 — Artyom Borovik, journalist and media magnate (b. 1960)
- March 19 — Mikhail Yefremov, politician and diplomat (b. 1911)
- March 29 — Yevgeny Feofanov, boxer (b. 1937)
- March - William Pokhlyobkin, writer (born 1923)
- April 5 — Irina Sebrova, Air Force pilot and officer (b. 1914)
- April 10 — David Klyshko, physicist (b. 1929)
- April 15 — Irina Gubanova, ballerina and film actress (b. 1940)
- April 17 — Pyotr Glebov, film actor (b. 1915)
- April 19 — Sergey Zalygin, writer (b. 1913)
- April 25 — Alla Larionova, theater and film actress (b. 1931)
- April 28 — Sergey Khristianovich, mechanics scientist (b. 1908)
- May 15 — Alfred Kuchevsky, ice hockey defenceman (b. 1931)
- May 17 — Angelina Stepanova, stage and film actress (b. 1905)
- May 19 — Yevgeny Khrunov, cosmonaut (b. 1933)
- May 24 — Oleg Yefremov, actor and theatre producer (b. 1927)
- June 2
  - Svyatoslav Fyodorov, ophthalmologist and politician (b. 1927)
  - Mikhail Schweitzer, film director and screenwriter (b. 1920)
- June 13 — Yefim Gamburg, animation director (b. 1925)
- June 15 — Grigori Gorin, playwright and writer (b. 1940)
- June 18 — Boris Vasilyev, cyclist (b. 1937)
- July 4 — Yuri Klinskikh, singer, songwriter and arranger (b. 1964)
- July 16 — Igor Domnikov, journalist and editor (b. 1959)
- July 21
  - Vladimir Novikov, statesman (b. 1907)
  - Maria Kleschar-Samokhvalova, painter and graphic artist (b. 1915)
- July 24 — Anatoli Firsov, ice hockey player (b. 1941)
- July 26 — Dalkhan Khozhaev, Chechen historian, field commander, brigadier general and author (b. 1961)
- July 27 — Vladimir Lisunov, nonconformist artist (b. 1940)
- August 1 — Galina Sergeyeva, actress (b. 1914)
- August 8 — Anatoli Romashin, film and theater actor and director (b. 1931)
- August 14 — Rostislav Vovkushevsky, realist painter (b. 1917)
- August 25 — Valeriy Priyomykhov, actor, film director and author (b. 1943)
- September 2 — Gennady Smirnov, footballer (b. 1955)
- September 14 — Igor Luzhkovsky, swimmer (b. 1938)
- September 16 — Alexandra Petrova, model and beauty pageant contestant (b. 1980)
- September 20 — Gherman Titov, cosmonaut (b. 1935)
- September 22 — Alexei Kostrikin, mathematician (b. 1929)
- October 2 — Nikolai Fedorenko, philologist, orientalist and diplomat (b. 1912)
- October 8 — Vsevolod Larionov, stage and film actor (b. 1928)
- October 9 — Leonid Potapov, ethnographer (b. 1905)
- October 10 — Nikolai Lyashchenko, army general (b. 1910)
- November 5 — Gleb Savinov, painter and art teacher (b. 1915)
- November 7 — Boris Zakhoder, poet and children's writer (b. 1918)
- November 18
  - Ilya Starinov, military officer (b. 1900)
  - Konstantin Krizhevsky, football defender (b. 1926)
- November 20
  - Nikolay Dollezhal, engineer (b. 1899)
  - Vyacheslav Kotyonochkin, animation director, animator and artist (b. 1927)
- November 30 — Olga Bogaevskaya, painter and graphic artist (b. 1915)
- December 14 — Pavel Plotnikov, Air Force general (b. 1920)

== See also ==
- List of Russian films of 2000
