= 1941 in the Soviet Union =

- Decades: 1920s; 1930s; 1940s; 1950s; 1960s
- See also: History of the Soviet Union; List of years in the Soviet Union

The following lists events that happened during 1941 in the Union of Soviet Socialist Republics.

== Incumbents ==
- General Secretary of the Communist Party of the Soviet Union – Joseph Stalin
- Chairman of the Presidium of the Supreme Soviet of the Soviet Union – Mikhail Kalinin
- Chairman of the Council of People's Commissars of the Soviet Union – Vyacheslav Molotov (until 6 May), Joseph Stalin (starting 6 May)

== Events ==
- January 1: Soviet Armed Forces reach 4,207,000
- February 15 to 20: 18th Conference of All-Union Communist Party
- February 24: Kramatorsk Heavy Machinery Construction Plant was commissioned
- March 20: Head of Intelligence Filipp Golikov presented the report, which indicated the possible directions of German invasion to the Soviet Union
- April – The Valley of Geysers on the Kamchatka Peninsula is discovered by Tatyana Ustinova.
- May 6: Joseph Stalin replaces Vyacheslav Molotov as Prime Minister
- May 13: Head of the Red Army's General Staff issued directives on advancing the 25th Soviet Rifle Corps and the 19th, 21st and 22nd Armies to the line of Western Dvina and Dnepr
- May 14: Narkom of Defence Semyon Timoshenko gave an order on pre-term graduation of cadets, commissioning them to the troops
- May 16: Diplomatic relations with Iraq were established
- June 12: Timoshenko ordered the military councils of boundary districts to start the advancing of troops from rear closer to the state frontier
- June 13: Joseph Stalin suspended Timoshenko's request to bring the frontier troops into alertness
- June 14: TASS issued a report, labelling groundless the statements about the forthcoming war with Germany, spread by foreign and particularly British press
- June 21: Georgy Zhukov imparted via HF of waiting for important document to the staff heads of the military districts
- June 22: The Communist Party Central Committee issues the decree "On the Organization of Struggle in the Rear of German troops"; diplomatic relations with Germany ceased, relations with Italy, Romania and Denmark were interrupted
  - Commander-in-Chief of the Black Sea Fleet Filipp Oktyabrsky reported to Zhukov on the approach of a large number of unknown aircraft at 03:07
  - Head of Staff of the Western Military District General Vladimir Klimovskikh reported on German air raids on Byelorussian towns at 03:30
  - Western and Baltic Military Districts reported on the onset of German ground hostilities at 04:10
  - Brest Fortress was shelled at 04:15
  - Timoshenko's directive N2 was delivered to military districts at 07:15
  - sixteen German aircraft bombed Grodno at 07:15 from the altitude of 1 km
  - Government's public radio report on the declaration of war at 12:00
- June 23: High Command Headquarters (later - Headquarters of Supreme Commander-in-Chief) was formed; mobilization plan on ammunition production was introduced; Soviets leave Grodno
- June 25–28: Kaunas pogrom
- June 26: Daugavpils surrendered
- June 27: Slutsk surrendered
- June 28: Minsk surrendered
- June 29: Operation Silver Fox begins
- June 30: State Defence Committee was formed; diplomatic relations with France were interrupted
- July 3: Stalin gave a broadcast talk
- July 4: directive on economical policy during the forced evacuation of production facilities was issued; State Defence Committee adopted decree "On voluntary mobilization of Moscow and the Moscow Oblast working-people to the divisions of people's militia"
- July 10: Battle of Smolensk breaks out
- July 11-September 26: Battle of Kiev
- July 15: Battle of Uman begins
- July 16: Presidium of the Supreme Soviet establishes the office of military commissar
- July 18: diplomatic relations with Czechoslovakia were resumed
- July 19: Joseph Stalin replaces Semyon Timoshenko as Defense Minister
- July 25: Petliura Days
- July 30: Reserve Front was formed; diplomatic relations with Polish government-in-exile were established, while relations with Greece were resumed
- August 1: Boris Shaposhnikov succeeded Zhukov as the Head of the General Staff
- August 5-October 16: Siege of Odessa
- August 5: diplomatic relations with Norway were resumed
- August 7: diplomatic relations with Belgium were resumed
- August 8: Stalin appoints himself Commander-in-Chief of the army
- August 21: Germans took Chudovo
- August 25: Anglo-Soviet invasion of Iran begins; Germans took Dnepropetrovsk
- August 30: Yelnya Offensive begins
- September 4: shelling of Leningrad began
- September 8: Encirclement of Leningrad was completed; the city's Badayev Depots and "The Red Star" creamery were ruined by German aviation (3,000 tons of flour and 2,500 tons of sugar were marred)
- September 9: Operation Wotan was started
- September 11: 157 political prisoners incarcerated at Oryol Prison were executed in Medvedev Forest, near Oryol. Among the victims were Christian Rakovsky, Sergei Efron, Olga Kameneva, and Maria Spiridonova.
- September 12: 1st Battle of Rostov begins, the first snowfalls of the winter of 1941–1942 is reported on the front.
- September 18: the 100th, 127th, 153rd and 161st Soviet Rifle Divisions were converted into the Guards Divisions
- September 19: Soviets left Kiev
- September 29: The Moscow Conference; U.S. representative Averell Harriman and British representative Lord Beaverbrook meet with Soviet foreign minister Molotov to arrange assistance.
- September 29 to 30: The Holocaust: Babi Yar massacre – German troops assisted by Ukrainian police and local collaborators kill 33,771 Jews.
- September 30: early stage of the Battle of Moscow takes place
- October 1: Vsevobuch was re-introduced
- October 4: Germans captured Spas-Demensk
- October 5: Germans captured Yukhnov
- October 6: Bryansk was captured
- October 12: State Defence Committee decides on building the defensive lines near Moscow
- October 13: Battle at Borodino Field takes place; fall of Kaluga
- October 14: Germans took Kalinin
- October 15: the State Defense Committee issued an order on immediate evacuation of the Presidium of the Supreme Soviet, the government and foreign diplomatic missions from Moscow.
- October 16: fall of Borovsk, the Soviet government moves to Kuibyshev but Joseph Stalin remains in the capital of Moscow.
- October 18: fall of Mozhaysk and Maloyaroslavets
- October 19: State Defence Committee introduced the state of siege in Moscow and adjacent areas
- October 30: Germans imposed siege on Sevastopol
- November: Three deer transportation units were formed in the 14th Soviet Army, with 1,000 deer and 140–150 herdsmen and soldiers in each unit.
- November 26: People's Commissariat of Mortar Armament is created
- December 5: Germans entered Yelets
- December 9: Soviets liberated Rogachyovo, Venyov and Yelets from Germans
- December 11: Solnechnogorsk was liberated from Germans
- December 15: Soviets liberated Klin at 02:00 from Germans
- December 16: Kalinin was liberated from Germans
- December 20: Volokolamsk was liberated from Germans
- December 26: Naro-Fominsk was liberated from Germans
- The Childless tax is established. it would last until 1990.

== Births ==
- January 28 – Yevhen Marchuk, 4th Prime Minister of Ukraine (d. 2021)
- March 7 – Andrei Mironov, actor (d. 1987)
- March 16 – Volodymyr Kozhukhar, Ukrainian conductor (d. 2022)
- April 28 – Iryna Zhylenko, Ukrainian poet (d. 2013)
- May 5
  - Anatoly Levchenko, cosmonaut (d. 1988)
  - Alexander Ragulin, hockey player (d. 2004)
- May 8 – Yuri Voronov, Abkhazian politician and academic (d. 1995)
- May 16 – Gennadiy Prashkevich, science fiction writer
- May 22 – Nikolay Olyalin, actor (d. 2009)
- May 25
  - Oleg Dahl, actor (d. 1981)
  - Vladimir Voronin, 3rd President of Moldova
- June 1 – Alexander Zakharov, physicist and astronomer
- June 10 – Aida Vedishcheva, singer
- June 15 – Ivan Mykolaichuk, actor, producer and screenwriter (d. 1987)
- June 20 – Albert Shesternyov, soccer player and coach (d. 1994)
- June 21 – Valeri Zolotukhin, actor (d. 2013)
- June 26 – Tamara Moskvina, pair skating coach and former competitive skater
- July 6 – Fuad Guliyev, 5th Prime Minister of Azerbaijan
- July 20
  - Vladimir Lyakhov, cosmonaut (d. 2018)
  - Vladimir Veber, Moldovan footballer
- August 8 – Anri Jergenia, 4th Prime Minister of Abkhazia (d. 2020)
- August 27 – Yuri Malyshev, cosmonaut (d. 1999)
- September 3 – Sergei Dovlatov, journalist and writer (d. 1990)
- September 15 – Viktor Zubkov, 36th Prime Minister of Russia
- September 24 – Igor Yasulovich, actor (d. 2023)
- October 1 – Vyacheslav Vedenin, cross county skier (d. 2021)
- October 11 – Valery Postoyanov, Olympic sport shooter (d. 2018)
- October 23 – Igor Smirnov, 1st President of Transnistria
- December 4 – Leila Saalik, Estonian actress
- December 8 – Viktor Anichkin, footballer (d. 1975)
- December 10 – Ihor Poklad, Ukrainian composer (d. 2025)
- December 12 – Vitaly Solomin, (d. 2002)

== Deaths ==
- February 5 – Otto Strandman, 1st Prime Minister of Estonia (b. 1875)
- February 15 – Pavel Blonsky, psychologist, philosopher and founder of Soviet paedology (b. 1884)
- July 1 – Mikhail Kaganovich, politician (b. 1888)
- July 3 – Friedrich Akel, Estonian diplomat, politician (b. 1871)
- July 4 – Stepan Suprun, twice Hero of the Soviet Union (b. 1907)
- July 22 – Dmitry Pavlov, general (b. 1897)
- July 27 – Vladimir Klimovskikh, general (b. 1885)
- July 28 – Pyotr Akhlyustin, major general (b. 1896)
- July 30 – Hugo Celmins, 5th Prime Minister of Latvia (b. 1877)
- August 31 – Marina Tsvetayeva, poet (b. 1892)
- September 11
  - Christian Rakovsky, diplomat and statesman (b. 1873)
  - Maria Spiridonova, politician (b. 1884)
- September 20
  - Mikhail Kirponos, Colonel General (b. 1892)
  - Mykhailo Burmystenko, politician (b. 1902)
- October 16
  - Sergei Efron, poet and secret police operative (b. 1893)
  - Zanis Bahs, Latvian military general (b. 1885)
- October 26
  - Arkady Gaidar, writer and commander (b. 1904)
  - Masha Bruskina, nurse (b. 1924)
- October 28
  - 20 Soviet military officers and politicians executed in Kuybyshev
    - Pavel Rychagov (b. 1911)
    - Grigori Shtern (b. 1900)
    - Yakov Smushkevich (b. 1902)
    - Filipp Goloshchekin (b. 1876)
    - Aleksandr Loktionov (b. 1893)
- October 29 – Alexander Afinogenov, playwright (b. 1904)
- November 16 – Miina Harma, Estonian composer (b. 1864)
- December 30 – El Lissitzky, artist and architect (b. 1890)

== See also ==
- 1941 in fine arts of the Soviet Union
- List of Soviet films of 1941
