= 1999 in Russia =

- Decades: 1970s; 1980s; 1990s; 2000s; 2010s
- See also: History of Russia; Timeline of Russian history; List of years in Russia

Events from the year 1999 in Russia.

== Incumbents ==
- President: Boris Yeltsin (until 31 December), Vladimir Putin (from 31 December, acting President)
- Prime Minister:
  - until 12 May: Yevgeny Primakov
  - 12 May - 9 August: Sergei Stepashin
  - starting 9 August: Vladimir Putin
- Minister of Defence: Igor Sergeyev

=== Governors ===
- Amur Oblast: Anatoly Belonogov (CPRF)
- Arkhangelsk Oblast: Anatoly Yefremov (Independent / Unity ally)
- Astrakhan Oblast: Anatoly Guzhvin (NDR / Unity)
- Belgorod Oblast: Yevgeny Savchenko (Independent / OVR)
- Bryansk Oblast: Yury Lodkin (CPRF)
- Chelyabinsk Oblast: Pyotr Sumin (PPUR)
- Irkutsk Oblast: Boris Govorin (Independent / OVR)
- Ivanovo Oblast: Vladislav Tikhomirov (Independent / OVR)
- Kaliningrad Oblast: Leonid Gorbenko (Independent)
- Kaluga Oblast: Valery Sudarenkov (Independent)
- Kemerovo Oblast: Aman Tuleyev (Independent / OVR)
- Kirov Oblast: Vladimir Shaklein (Independent)
- Kostroma Oblast: Viktor Shershunov (CPRF)
- Kurgan Oblast: Oleg Bogomolov (Independent)
- Kursk Oblast: Alexander Rutskoy (Derzhava)
- Leningrad Oblast: Valery Serdyukov (Independent)
- Lipetsk Oblast: Oleg Korolyov (Independent / OVR)
- Magadan Oblast: Valentin Tsvetkov (Independent)
- Moscow Oblast: Anatoly Tyazhlov (NDR / OVR)
- Murmansk Oblast: Yuri Yevdokimov (Independent / OVR)
- Nizhny Novgorod Oblast: Ivan Sklyarov (NDR / OVR)
- Novgorod Oblast: Mikhail Prusak (NDR)
- Novosibirsk Oblast: Vitaly Mukha (Independent, until December 29), Viktor Tolokonsky (Independent, starting December 29)
- Omsk Oblast: Leonid Polezhayev (Independent / Unity)
- Orenburg Oblast: Vladimir Elagin (Independent, until December 29), Alexey Chernyshev (APR, starting December 29)
- Oryol Oblast: Yegor Stroyev (Independent)
- Penza Oblast: Vasily Bochkarev (Independent)
- Pskov Oblast: Yevgeny Mikhailov (LDPR)
- Rostov Oblast: Vladimir Chub (Independent / OVR)
- Ryazan Oblast: Vyacheslav Lyubimov (CPRF)
- Sakhalin Oblast: Igor Farkhutdinov (Independent / DND)
- Samara Oblast: Konstantin Titov (Voice of Russia / SPS)
- Saratov Oblast: Dmitry Ayatskov (Independent / OVR)
- Smolensk Oblast: Aleksandr Prokhorov (CPRF)
- Tambov Oblast: Aleksandr Ryabov (CPRF, until December 26), Oleg Betin (Independent / Unity, starting December 26)
- Tomsk Oblast: Viktor Kress (Independent / NDR)
- Tula Oblast: Vasily Starodubtsev (CPRF)
- Tver Oblast: Vladimir Platov (Independent / Unity)
- Tyumen Oblast: Leonid Roketsky (Independent / NDR)
- Ulyanovsk Oblast: Yuri Goryachev (Independent)
- Vladimir Oblast: Nikolay Vinogradov (CPRF)
- Volgograd Oblast: Nikolai Maksyuta (CPRF)
- Vologda Oblast: Vyacheslav Pozgalyov (Independent / Unity)
- Voronezh Oblast: Ivan Shabanov (Independent / CPRF ally)
- Yaroslavl Oblast: Anatoly Lisitsyn (Independent / OVR)
- Jewish Autonomous Oblast: Nikolay Volkov (Independent)

== Events ==
=== March ===
- March 19 — 1999 Vladikavkaz bombing

=== June ===
- June — Exercise Zapad-99

=== August ===
- August — Invasion of Dagestan

=== September ===
- September — Russian apartment bombings

=== October ===
- October 7 — Elistanzhi cluster bomb attack
- October 21 — Grozny ballistic missile attack
- October 29 — Baku–Rostov highway bombing

=== December ===
- December — Alkhan-Yurt massacre
- December 3 — 1999 Grozny refugee convoy shooting
- December 19 — 1999 Russian legislative election

== Births ==
- June 1 — Dmitri Aliev, figure skater
- June 17 — Elena Rybakina, Kazakhstani tennis player

== Deaths ==
=== January ===
- January 7 — Viktor Sobolev, astrophysicist (b. 1915)
- January 8 — Lyusyena Ovchinnikova, film actress (b. 1931)
- January 24 — Elena Dobronravova, actress (b. 1932)
- January 28 — Valery Gavrilin, composer (b. 1939)
- January 29 — Vladimir Kirillin, physicist (b. 1913)
- January 30 — Svetlana Savyolova, film and stage actress (b. 1942)

=== February ===
- February 11 — Nikolai Sergeyev, fleet admiral (b. 1909)
- February 18 — Nikolay Latyshev, referee (b. 1913)

=== March ===
- March 20 — Igor Vladimirov, film and theater actor and director (b. 1919)
- March 30 — Igor Netto, footballer (b. 1930)
- March 31
  - Aleksandr Filatov, alpine skier (b. 1928)
  - Yuri Knorozov, linguist, epigrapher and ethnographer (b. 1922)

=== April ===
- April 4 — Vladimir Orlov, 14th Chairman of the Presidium of the Supreme Soviet of the Russian SFSR (b. 1921)
- April 27 — Pavel Klushantsev, cameraman, film director, producer, screenwriter and author (b. 1910)

=== May ===
- May 2 — Igor M. Diakonoff, historian, linguist and translator (b. 1915)
- May 31 — Anatoli Ivanov, writer (b. 1928)

=== June ===
- June 4 — Yuri Vasilyev, stage and film actor (b. 1939)
- June 6 — Ilya Musin, conductor (b. 1904)
- June 7 — Victor Otiev, painter and graphic artist (b. 1935)
- June 12 — Sergey Khlebnikov, Olympic speed skater (b. 1955)
- June 15 — Igor Kholin, poet and fiction writer (b. 1920)
- June 25 — Yevgeny Morgunov, actor, film director and script writer (b. 1927)
- June 26 — Muza Krepkogorskaya, theater and film actress (b. 1924)
- June 28 — Anatoliy Zheglanov, ski jumper (b. 1946)

=== July ===
- July 2 — Viktor Chebrikov, 6th Chairman of the Committee for State Security (b. 1923)
- July 3
  - Pelageya Polubarinova-Kochina, applied mathematician (b. 1899)
  - Igor Belsky, ballet dancer (b. 1925)
- July 13 — Yevgeny Goryansky, football striker and coach (b. 1929)
- July 14 — Umyar Mavlikhanov, fencer (b. 1937)
- July 22 — Gennadiy Agapov, race walker (b. 1933)
- July 23 — Dmitri Tertyshny, ice hockey defenceman (b. 1976)
- July 25 — Natalia Androsova, last member of the House of Romanov (b. 1917)
- July 27 — Aleksandr Aleksandrov, mathematician, physicist and philosopher (b. 1912)
- July 28
  - Maxim Munzuk, Tuvan actor (b. 1910)
  - Georgy Rerberg, cinematographer (b. 1937)

=== August ===
- August 5 — Rimma Zhukova, speed skater (b. 1925)
- August 9 — Yuri Volyntsev, stage and film actor (b. 1932)
- August 12 — Pavel Arsenov, film actor, screenwriter and director (b. 1936)
- August 21 — Yevgeni Yeliseyev, football player and coach (b. 1908)
- August 22 — Aleksandr Demyanenko, film and theater actor (b. 1937)

=== September ===
- September 5 — Leonid Sedov, physicist (b. 1907)
- September 8
  - Lev Razgon, journalist (b. 1908)
  - Vladimir Samoilov, film and theater actor (b. 1924)
- September 15 — Petr Shelokhonov, actor, director, filmmaker and socialite (b. 1929)
- September 18 — Viktor Safronov, astronomer (b. 1917)
- September 20 — Raisa Gorbacheva, First Lady of the Soviet Union (b. 1932)
- September 22 — Vasili Trofimov, football player (b. 1919)
- September 25 — Anna Shchetinina, merchant marine sailor (b. 1908)
- September 30
  - Nikolay Annenkov, actor (b. 1899)
  - Dmitry Likhachev, medievalist, linguist and concentration camp survivor (b. 1906)

=== October ===
- October 7 — Genrikh Sapgir, writer (b. 1928)
- October 11 — Galina Bystrova, athlete (b. 1934)
- October 21 — Gennady Vasilyev, film director (b. 1940)

=== November ===
- November 8 — Yuri Malyshev, cosmonaut (b. 1941)
- November 18
  - Ivan Frolov, philosopher (b. 1929)
  - Yevgeni Belosheikin, ice hockey player (b. 1966)
- November 20 — Yuri Chesnokov, football player (b. 1952)

=== December ===
- December 1 — Alexander Tatarenko, painter and art teacher (b. 1925)
- December 2 — Vladimir Kravtsov, handball player (b. 1949)
- December 3 — Boris Kuznetsov, footballer (b. 1928)
- December 9 — Yakov Rylsky, sabre fencer and olympic champion (b. 1928)
- December 21 — Sergey Nagovitsyn, singer (b. 1968)
- December 23
  - Timur Gaidar, rear admiral, writer and journalist (b. 1926)
  - Vladimir Kondrashin, basketball player and coach (b. 1929)
- December 26 — Ivan Yakovlev, statesman (b. 1910)

== See also ==
- List of Russian films of 1999
