= 2001 in Russia =

- Decades: 1980s; 1990s; 2000s; 2010s; 2020s
- See also: History of Russia; Timeline of Russian history; List of years in Russia

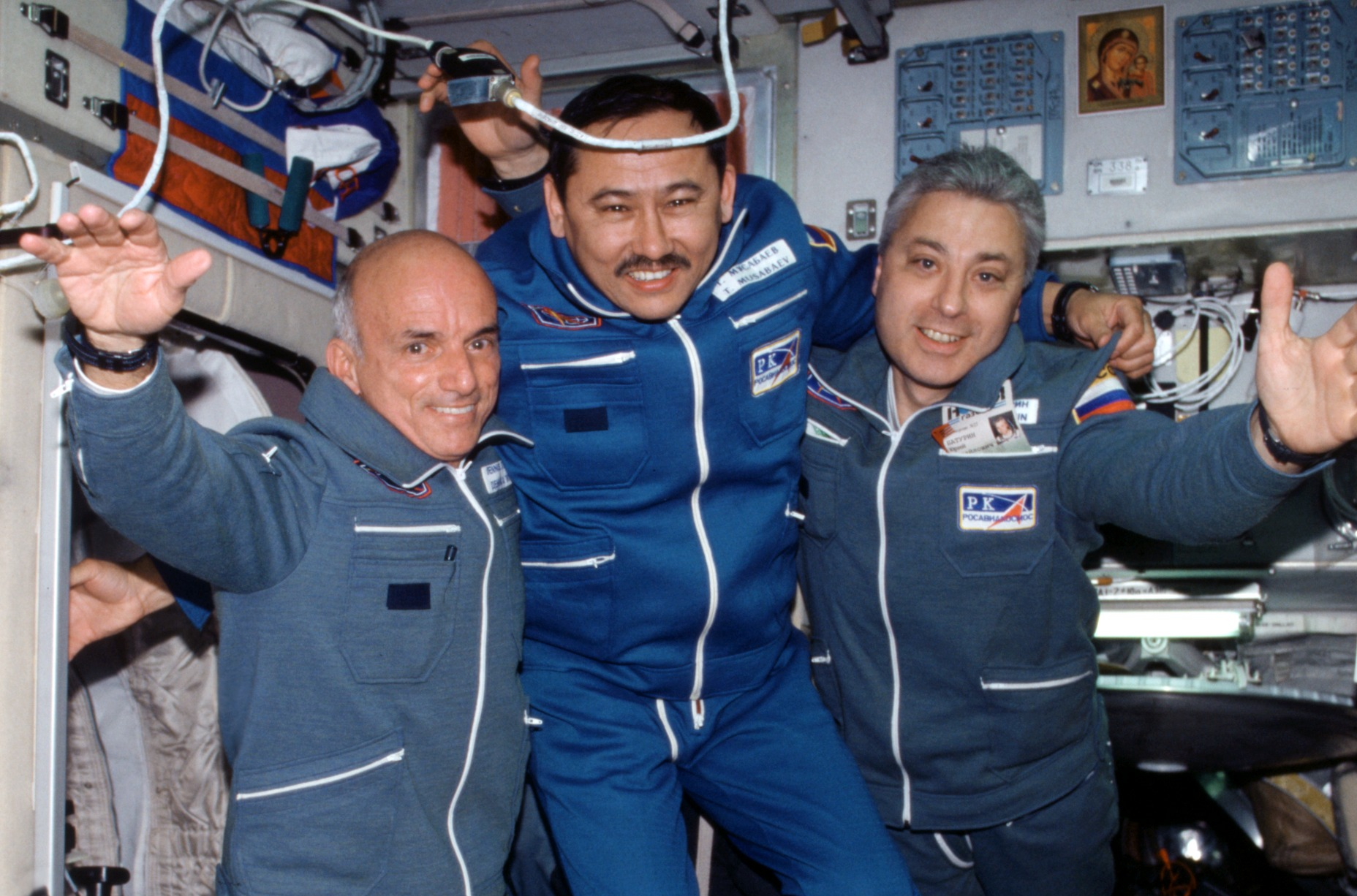
The Soyuz Soyuz TM-32 Taxi Flight crewmembers.

Events from the year 2001 in Russia.

== Incumbents ==
- President: Vladimir Putin
- Prime Minister: Mikhail Kasyanov

=== Governors ===
- Amur Oblast: Anatoly Belonogov (CPRF, until May 20), Leonid Korotkov (Independent, starting May 20)
- Arkhangelsk Oblast: Anatoly Yefremov (Unity / ER)
- Astrakhan Oblast: Anatoly Guzhvin (ER)
- Belgorod Oblast: Yevgeny Savchenko (ER)
- Bryansk Oblast: Yury Lodkin (CPRF)
- Chelyabinsk Oblast: Pyotr Sumin (SJP / ER ally)
- Irkutsk Oblast: Boris Govorin (ER)
- Ivanovo Oblast: Vladimir Tikhonov (CPRF)
- Kaliningrad Oblast: Vladimir Yegorov (Independent / ER ally)
- Kaluga Oblast: Anatoly Artamonov (ER)
- Kemerovo Oblast: Aman Tuleyev (Independent / ER ally)
- Kirov Oblast: Vladimir Shaklein (Independent)
- Kostroma Oblast: Viktor Shershunov (CPRF)
- Kurgan Oblast: Oleg Bogomolov (Independent)
- Kursk Oblast: Aleksandr Mikhailov (CPRF)
- Leningrad Oblast: Valery Serdyukov (Independent / ER ally)
- Lipetsk Oblast: Oleg Korolyov (ER)
- Magadan Oblast: Valentin Tsvetkov (Independent)
- Moscow Oblast: Boris Gromov (ER)
- Murmansk Oblast: Yuri Yevdokimov (ER)
- Nizhny Novgorod Oblast: Ivan Sklyarov (ER, until August 8), Gennady Khodyrev (CPRF / Independent, starting August 8)
- Novgorod Oblast: Mikhail Prusak (DPR / ER)
- Novosibirsk Oblast: Viktor Tolokonsky (Independent)
- Omsk Oblast: Leonid Polezhayev (ER)
- Orenburg Oblast: Alexey Chernyshev (APR)
- Oryol Oblast: Yegor Stroyev (Independent / ER ally)
- Penza Oblast: Vasily Bochkarev (Independent / ER ally)
- Pskov Oblast: Yevgeny Mikhailov (LDPR)
- Rostov Oblast: Vladimir Chub (ER)
- Ryazan Oblast: Vyacheslav Lyubimov (CPRF)
- Sakhalin Oblast: Igor Farkhutdinov (Independent)
- Samara Oblast: Konstantin Titov (SPS)
- Saratov Oblast: Dmitry Ayatskov (ER)
- Smolensk Oblast: Aleksandr Prokhorov (CPRF)
- Tambov Oblast: Oleg Betin (ER)
- Tomsk Oblast: Viktor Kress (Independent / ER ally)
- Tula Oblast: Vasily Starodubtsev (CPRF)
- Tver Oblast: Vladimir Platov (ER)
- Tyumen Oblast: Leonid Roketsky (Independent, until January 26), Sergey Sobyanin (Independent/ER, starting January 26)
- Ulyanovsk Oblast: Vladimir Shamanov (ER)
- Vladimir Oblast: Nikolay Vinogradov (CPRF)
- Volgograd Oblast: Nikolai Maksyuta (CPRF)
- Vologda Oblast: Vyacheslav Pozgalyov (ER)
- Voronezh Oblast: Vladimir Kulakov (Independent / ER ally)
- Yaroslavl Oblast: Anatoly Lisitsyn (ER)
- Jewish Autonomous Oblast: Nikolay Volkov (Independent / ER ally)

== Events ==
- February 18 - FBI agent Robert Hanssen is arrested and charged with spying for Russia for 15 years.
- March 23 - The Russian space station Mir re-enters the atmosphere near Nadi, Fiji, and falls into the Pacific Ocean.
- April 14 - Gazprom corporation took over NTV television channel
- May 9 - 56th Victory Day
- May 15 - Closure of Varshavsky railway station, Saint Petersburg
- June - Unified State Exam introduced
- June 15 - Declaration of Shanghai Cooperation Organisation signed
- June 29 - Good Night, Little Ones! airs its very last episode on Channel One Russia due to economic problems with the station.
- July 3 - A Vladivostokavia Tupolev Tu-154 jetliner crashes on approach to landing at Irkutsk, Russia, killing 145.
- July 16 - The People's Republic of China and the Russian Federation sign the Treaty of Good-Neighborliness and Friendly Cooperation.
- August 27 - Russian Football Premier League is created.
- October 4 - Siberia Airlines Flight 1812 crashes over the Black Sea en route from Tel Aviv, Israel to Novosibirsk, Russia; 78 are killed.
- October 17 - President Vladimir Putin ordered to close the Lourdes SIGINT station, Cuba and Cam Ranh Air Force Base in Vietnam
- December 1 - United Russia is created.

== Notable births ==
- March 30 – Anastasia Potapova, tennis player
- June 21 - Alexandra Obolentseva, chess player
- October 2 - Rodion Amirov, ice hockey player (died 2023)
- October 28 - Ekaterina Starshova, actress
- November 4 - Maksim Mukhin, football player

== Notable deaths ==
- January 11 - Princess Vera Konstantinovna of Russia (born 1906)
- March 17 - Boris Rauschenbach, physicist and rocket engineer (born 1915)
- May 7 - Boris Ryzhy, poet (born 1974)
- May 12 - Alexei Tupolev, aircraft designer (born 1925)
- May 13 - Sergey Afanasyev, engineer and politician (born 1918)
- May 15 - Georgy Shakhnazarov, politician (born 1924)
- May 19 - Alexei Petrovich Maresiev, World War II pilot (born 1916)
- May 30 - Nikolai Korndorf, composer (born 1947)
- June 5 - Vasily Kolotov, weightlifter (born 1944)
- July 1 - Nikolay Basov, physicist, Nobel Prize laureate (born 1922)
- July 17 - Timur Apakidze, aviator (born 1954)
- August 10
  - Vladimir Bougrine, painter (born 1938)
  - Stanislav Rostotsky, film director (born 1922)
- August 22 - Tatyana Averina, speed skater (born 1950)
- September 10 - Alexey Suetin, International Grandmaster of chess (born 1926)
- October 4 - Ahron Soloveichik, Russian-born American Rabbi (born 1917)
- October 10 - Vasily Mishin, rocket engineer (born 1917)
- October 23 - Georgy Vitsin, actor (born 1918)
- November 28 - Gleb Lozino-Lozinskiy, scientist (born 1909)
- November 29 - Viktor Astafiyev, writer (born 1924)
- December 1 - Pavel Sadyrin, footballer (born 1942)
- December 12 - Alexander Khmelik, creator of Yeralash (born 1925)
- December 23 - Dimitri Obolensky, historian (born 1918)
- December 27 - Boris Rybakov, historian (born 1908)

== See also ==
- List of Russian films of 2001
