= Bougrine =

Bougrine is a surname. Notable people with the surname include:

- Sabir Bougrine (born 1996), Moroccan footballer
- Vladimir Bougrine (1938–2001), Russian painter
