= Nagovitsyn =

Nagovitsyn (Russian: Наговицын or Наговицин) is a Russian masculine surname, its feminine counterpart is Nagovitsyna. It may refer to:

- Natalia Nagovitsina (died August 2025), Russian climber
- Sergey Nagovitsyn (1968–1999), Russian singer
- Vyacheslav Nagovitsin, Russian composer
- Vyacheslav Nagovitsyn, Politician
- Yelena Nagovitsyna (born 1982), Russian long-distance runner

== See also ==
- Nogovitsin
