= 1941 in fine arts of the Soviet Union =

The year 1941 was marked by many events that left an imprint on the history of Soviet and Russian Fine Arts.

== Events ==
- January 7 — The exhibition of the best works of Soviet artists was opened in Tretyakov gallery in Moscow. Exhibited 1180 works of painting, sculpture, graphic art, and architecture of 359 artists.
- February 4 — Exhibition of painting, sculpture, and graphic art, dedicated to 60th Anniversary of Klim Voroshilov was opened in Moscow. Exhibited 388 works of 219 artists.
- February 11 — The Second Exhibition of graduation works of High Art schools was opened in Moscow. Exhibited 205 works of 73 graduates of High Art schools.

== Births ==
- March 24 — Eduard Drobitsky (Russian: Дробицкий Эдуард Николаевич), Russian Soviet painter and graphic artist (d. 2007).

== Deaths ==
- March 15 — Alexej von Jawlensky (Russian: Явленский Алексей Георгиевич), Russian artist (b. 1864).
- April 3 — Ivan Shadr (Russian: Шадр Иван Дмитриевич), Russian Soviet sculptor (b. 1887).
- July 21 — Elizaveta Kruglikova (Russian: Кругликова Елизавета Сергеевна), Russian Soviet graphic artist (b. 1865).
- December 3 — Pavel Filonov (Russian: Филонов Павел Николаевич), Russian Soviet painter and graphic artist (b. 1883).
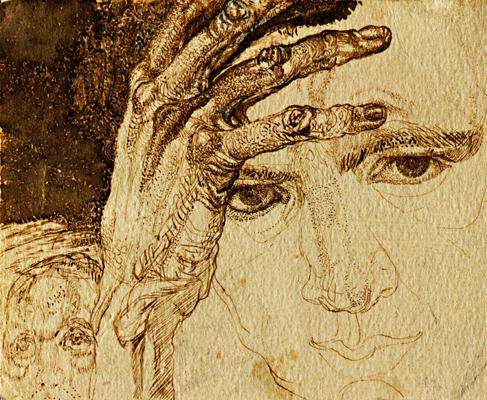
Pavel Filonov

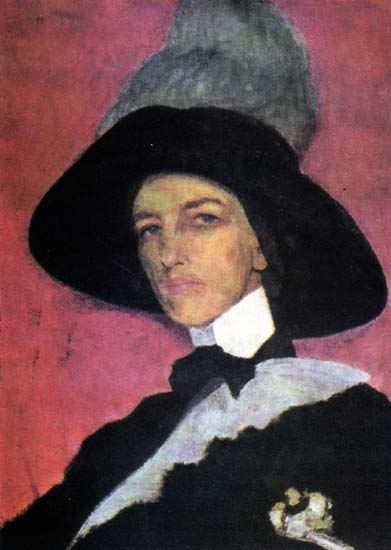
Elizaveta Kruglikova

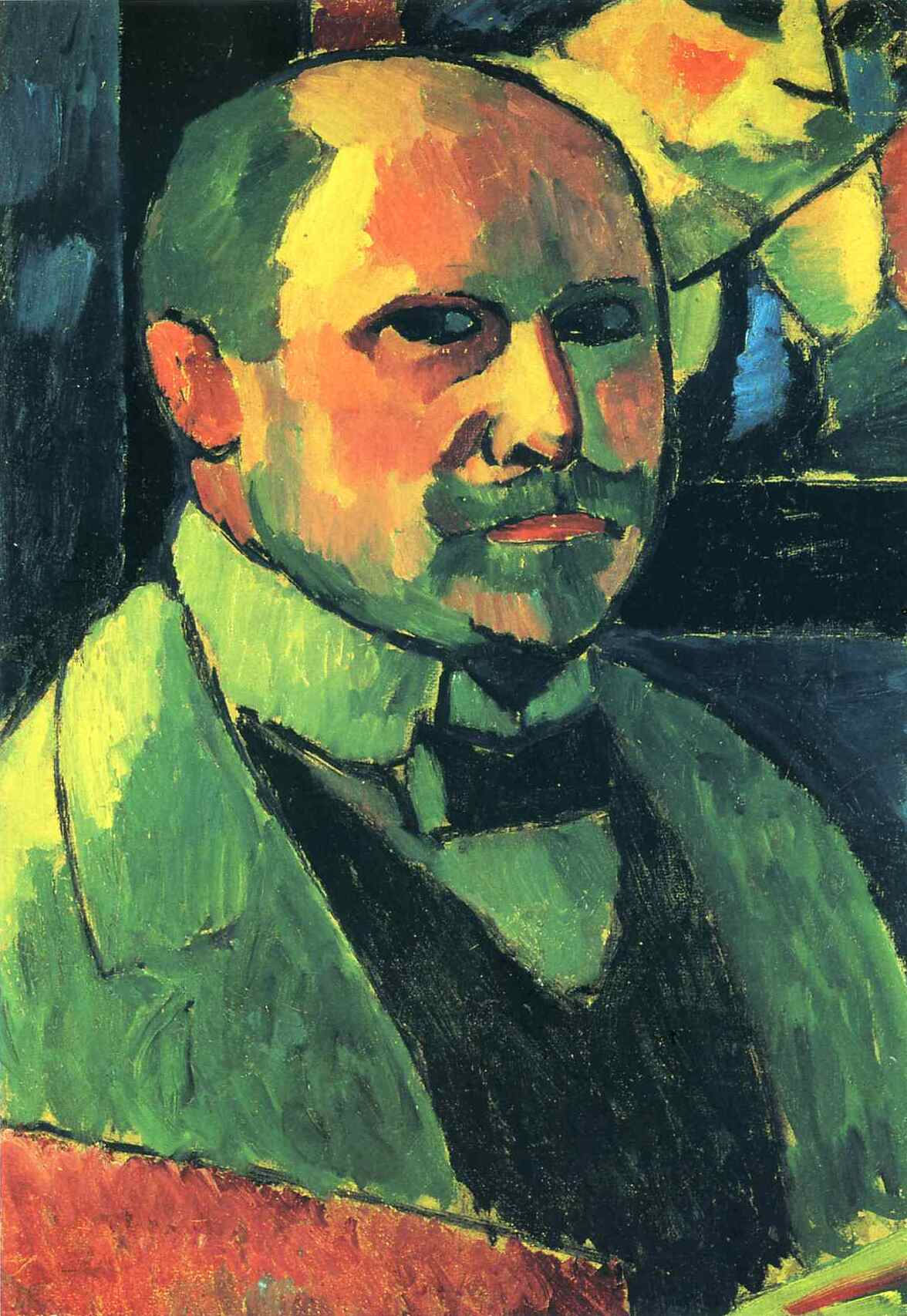
Alexej von Jawlensky

== See also ==
- List of Russian artists
- List of painters of Leningrad Union of Artists
- Saint Petersburg Union of Artists
- Russian culture
- 1941 in the Soviet Union

== Sources ==
- Выставка лучших произведений советских художников. Путеводитель. М., Комитет по делам искусств при СНК СССР, 1941.
- Выставка живописи, графики и скульптуры. Советские художники к ко дню шестидесятилетия К. Ворошилова. М., Искусство, 1941.
- Молодые художники РСФСР. Каталог выставки. М., Управление по делам искусств при СНК РСФСР, 1941.
- 7-я Выставка произведений ленинградских художников. Каталог. Л., ЛССХ, 1941.
- 2-я Выставка дипломных работ художественных вузов. 1940. М., Комитет по делам искусств при СНК СССР, 1941.
- Художник-гравер Леонид Фёдорович Овсянников. Авт. вступит. статьи П. Е. Корнилов. Л., 1941.
- Выставки советского изобразительного искусства. Справочник. Т. 3. 1941—1947 годы. М., Советский художник, 1973.
- Artists of Peoples of the USSR. Biobibliography Dictionary. Vol. 1. Moscow, Iskusstvo, 1970.
- Artists of Peoples of the USSR. Biobibliography Dictionary. Vol. 2. Moscow, Iskusstvo, 1972.
- Directory of Members of Union of Artists of USSR. Volume 1,2. Moscow, Soviet Artist Edition, 1979.
- Directory of Members of the Leningrad branch of the Union of Artists of Russian Federation. Leningrad, Khudozhnik RSFSR, 1980.
- Artists of Peoples of the USSR. Biobibliography Dictionary. Vol. 4 Book 1. Moscow, Iskusstvo, 1983.
- Directory of Members of the Leningrad branch of the Union of Artists of Russian Federation. Leningrad, Khudozhnik RSFSR, 1987.
- Персональные и групповые выставки советских художников. 1917-1947 гг. М., Советский художник, 1989.
- Artists of peoples of the USSR. Biobibliography Dictionary. Vol. 4 Book 2. Saint Petersburg: Academic project humanitarian agency, 1995.
- Link of Times: 1932 – 1997. Artists – Members of Saint Petersburg Union of Artists of Russia. Exhibition catalogue. Saint Petersburg, Manezh Central Exhibition Hall, 1997.
- Matthew C. Bown. Dictionary of 20th Century Russian and Soviet Painters 1900-1980s. London, Izomar, 1998.
- Vern G. Swanson. Soviet Impressionism. – Woodbridge, England: Antique Collectors' Club, 2001.
- Время перемен. Искусство 1960—1985 в Советском Союзе. СПб., Государственный Русский музей, 2006.
- Sergei V. Ivanov. Unknown Socialist Realism. The Leningrad School. Saint-Petersburg, NP-Print Edition, 2007. ISBN 5901724216, ISBN 9785901724217.
- Anniversary Directory graduates of Saint Petersburg State Academic Institute of Painting, Sculpture, and Architecture named after Ilya Repin, Russian Academy of Arts. 1915 – 2005. Saint Petersburg, Pervotsvet Publishing House, 2007.
