= Nogovitsyn =

Nogovitsyn (Russian: Ноговицын) is a Russian masculine surname, its feminine counterpart is Nogovitsyna. Notable people with the surname include:

- Anatoly Nogovitsyn (1952–2019), Russian general
- Matrena Nogovitsyna (born 1991), Russian draughts player
- Nikolay Nogovitsyn (born 1948), Russian Nordic combined skier

== See also ==
- Nagovitsin
