= Grigory Dzhanshiyev =

Russian lawyer, publicist and historian

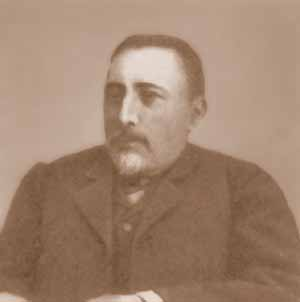
- Born: Григорий Аветович Джаншиев; 29 May 1851; Tiflis, Russian Empire (modern Georgia)
- Died: 30 July 1900 (aged 49); Saint Petersburg, Russian Empire
- Occupations: lawyer, writer, publicist, historian

Grigory Avetovich Dzhanshiyev (Armenian: Գրիգոր Ավետի Ջանշյան; Russian: Григорий Аветович Джаншиев; 29 May 1851, in Tiflis, Russian Empire, now Georgia – 30 July 1900, in Moscow, Russian Empire) was Russian Empire lawyer, publicist and historian of Armenian descent. A Moscow University alumnus, Dzhanshiyev authored 25 books, the best-known of which, On the Times of the Great Reform (Из эпохи великих реформ, 1892), was re-issued several times in his lifetime and is considered one of the best treatises on Alexander II's reforms in law and jurisdiction. Dzhanshiyev was also one of the authors of the Brockhaus and Efron Encyclopedic Dictionary.
