= 1893 in Russia =

- Decades: 1870s; 1880s; 1890s; 1900s; 1910s
- See also: History of Russia; Timeline of Russian history; List of years in Russia

Events from 1893 in Russia.

== Incumbents ==
- Monarch – Alexander III

== Events ==
- The construction of the Ob railway bridge began, which led to the founding of the Novonikolayevsky settlement. This settlement would later become the city of Novosibirsk in 1904, now one of Russia's largest cities.
- Tchaikovsky completed his final symphony, known as the Pathétique (Symphony No. 6), leading the first performance in Saint Petersburg.
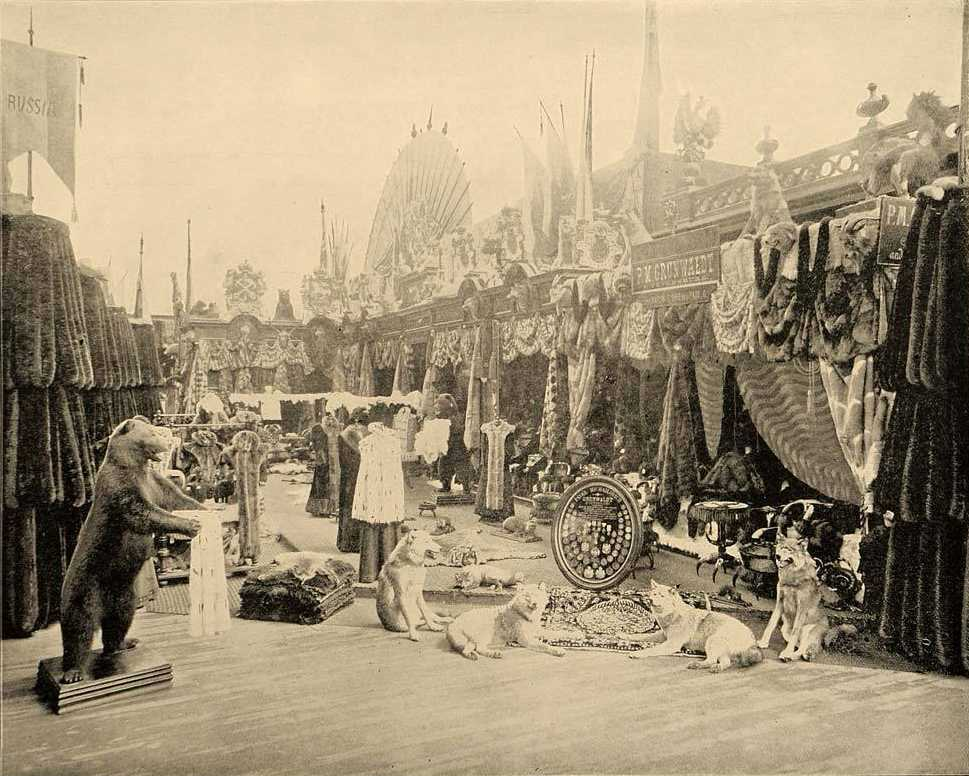
- Russian Furs Exhibit displayed by Paul M. Grunwaldt in the Russian section of the Manufacturer's Building at the 1893 Chicago World's Fair.
  Russia participated in the Chicago World's Fair, organizing a committee in St. Petersburg to coordinate exhibits. The committee published materials on Russian economy, industry, and technology for the occasion. Russia showcased machinery, agricultural products, vodka, and fine arts to highlight its modernization and industrial progress to the Western audience.
- The Emperor Alexander III and his wife Empress Maria Feodorovna on holiday in Copenhagen.
- Nicholas II, the last Emperor of Russia, visits England for the wedding of King George V and Queen Mary.
- The increase in the population has greatly reduced the average holding of land, which in 1893 amounted to 6.5 acres for each peasant. The improvidence of the peasants, drink, backward methods in agriculture, and bad crops have on more than one occasion caused famine to be felt in the agricultural regions.
- A detailed medical report was published by Dr. Frank Clemow documenting the cholera epidemic in the Caucasus region of Russia. The study analyzed how geography influenced the spread and severity of the outbreak, showing that the low-lying Northern Caucasus suffered more cases than the mountainous Southern Caucasus.
- Two letters exchanged between Princess Alix of Hesse and Nicholas Alexandrovich of Russia. In late 1893 they had already been in love for several years, but Alix was unwilling to convert to Orthodoxy which led her to initially reject Nicholas.
- The U.S Senate ratified an extradition treaty with the Emperor of Russia. President Grover Cleveland signed it into law.
- The Russian Government continued to enforce antisemitic laws, adopting a policy to deny American Jews visas for visits to Russia on the basis of their religion. Despite official and unofficial American protest, the Russians maintained this policy for decades.
- The first publication of The Story of an Unknown Man by Anton Chekhov.
- Vladimir Bekhterev described Ankylosing spondylitis (Bekhterev's disease).
- Sergei Rachmaninoff composed the symphonic poem The Rock.
- France and Russia signed a formal defensive treaty known as the Dual Alliance.

== Births ==
- January 17 – Robert Brichenok, artillery lieutenant general (d. 1972)
- February 19 – Boris Belousov, chemist and biophysicist (d. 1970)
- April 2 – Sergei Protopopov, avant-garde composer and music theorist (d. 1954)
- August 19 – Olga Baclanova, actress (d. 1974)
- June 27 – Ivan Belov, military commander and Komandarm 1st rank (d. 1938)
- July 19 – Vladimir Mayakovsky, poet, playwright, artist, and actor, a prominent figure of the Russian Futurist movement (d. 1930)
- September 4 – Nicholas Afanasiev, Eastern Orthodox theologian (d. 1966)
- October 6 – Mikhail Babushkin, polar aviator (d. 1937)
- October 12 – Yakov Agranov, the first chief of the Soviet Main Directorate of State Security and a deputy of NKVD chief Genrikh Yagoda (d. 1938)
- November 10 – Aksel Berg, scientist in radio-frequency engineering and Soviet Navy Admiral (d. 1979)
- November 13 – Filipp Alyabushev, major general in World War II (d. 1940)

== Deaths ==
- March 25 – Nikolay Alekseyev, entrepreneur and Mayor of Moscow (b. 1852)
- May 31 – Anna Barykova, poet, satirist and translator (b. 1839)
- June 5 – Yakov Grot, philologist (b. 1812)
- June 26 – Konstantin Albrecht, cellist, teacher and administrator (b. 1836)
- August 29 – Aleksey Apukhtin, poet, writer and critic (b. 1840)
- October 12 – Nikolai Zverev, pianist and teacher (b. 1833)
- October 16 – Iosif Kablits, revolutionary activist, sociologist and publicist (b. 1848)
- November 6 – Pyotr Ilyich Tchaikovsky, composer during the Romantic period (b. 1840)
- November 8 – Kirill Gorbunov, portrait painter and lithographer (b. 1822)
- November 10 – Leonid Hlibov, poet, writer, teacher, and civic figure (b. 1827)
- December 10 – Vasily Kenel, architect (b. 1834)
- December 13 - Karolina Pavlova, poet and novelist (b. 1807)
- December 16 – Sergei Gribkov, painter and iconographer (b. 1822)
