= 1937 in fine arts of the Soviet Union =

Kremlin Stars
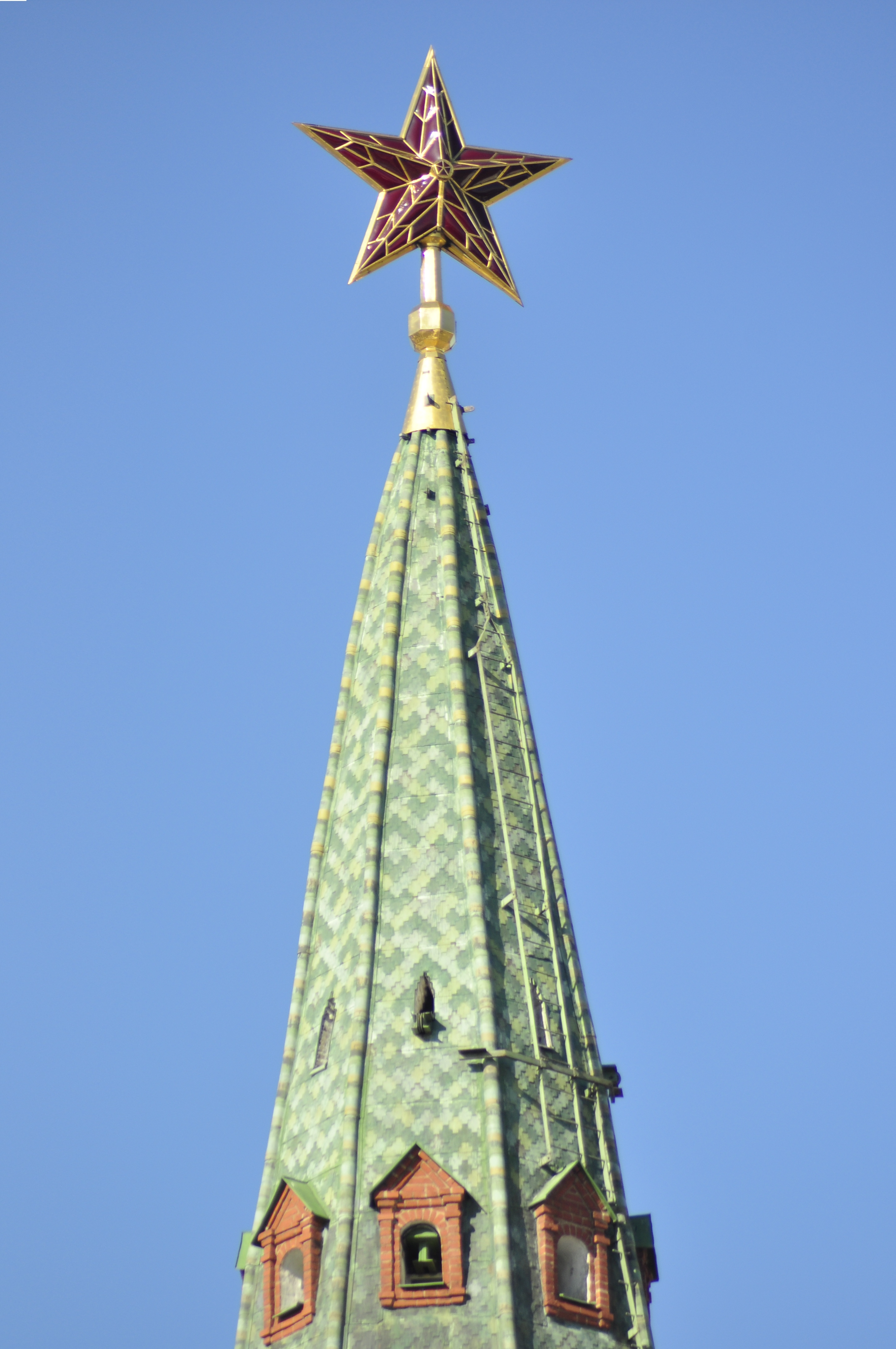
- Artist: Fyodor Fedorovsky
- Year: Various
- Medium: Cranberry glass
- Location: Moscow

The year 1937 was marked by many events that left an imprint on the history of Soviet and Russian Fine Arts.

== Events ==
- May 30 — Exhibition of Painting, Drawing, and Sculpture of Leningrad artists was opened in the House of Actors.
- Artist Isaak Brodsky was awarded the Grand Prix at the International Exhibition in Paris for the painting of Lenin speaks at the Putilov Plant (1929).
- Sculptural group Worker and Kolkhoz Woman was created for the Soviet pavilion at the World Exhibition in Paris by sculptor Vera Mukhina and architect Boris Iofan. An outstanding monument of monumental art, it was "an ideal and a symbol of Soviet-era". In August 1939 the sculpture Worker and Kolkhoz Woman was installed on a pedestal in front of the northern entrance to the All-Union Agricultural Exhibition in Moscow. In 2003-2009 was complete restoration of the sculptural group, accompanied by her dismantling of 40 fragments. There have been considerably strengthened framing compositions, all of the fragments were cleaned and treated with special anti-corrosion compounds. The sculpture was installed on a new specially built pavilion for her pedestal, echoing the proportions of the original pavilion of 1937. Inauguration of the monument Worker and Kolkhoz Woman took place in Moscow on December 4, 2009.
- Artist Alexander Samokhvalov was twice awarded the Grand Prix at the International Exhibition in Paris for the panel "Soviet Sport", performed in the Soviet Pavilion, and for his illustrations for the novel of The History of a City, by Saltykov-Shchedrin, and the Great Gold Medal for the painting Girl in a T-shirt. In the same year Samokhvalov painted one of his most famous paintings, A Subway builder's Girl with a drill.
- November 2 — New Kremlin ruby stars lit over Moscow. New ruby stars were made by sketches of the People's Artist of the USSR, the chief artist of the Bolshoi Theatre Academician Fyodor Fedorovsky.

== Births ==
- February 28 — Vitaly Tulenev (Russian: Тюленев Виталий Иванович), Russian Soviet painter and graphic artist, Honored Artist of the Russian Federation (died 1998).
- April 30 — George Moroz (Russian: Мороз Георгий Моисеевич), Russian Soviet painter.

== Deaths ==
- December 6 — Sergey Malyutin (Russian: Малютин Сергей Васильевич), Russian painter, Honored Art Worker of RSFSR (born 1859).
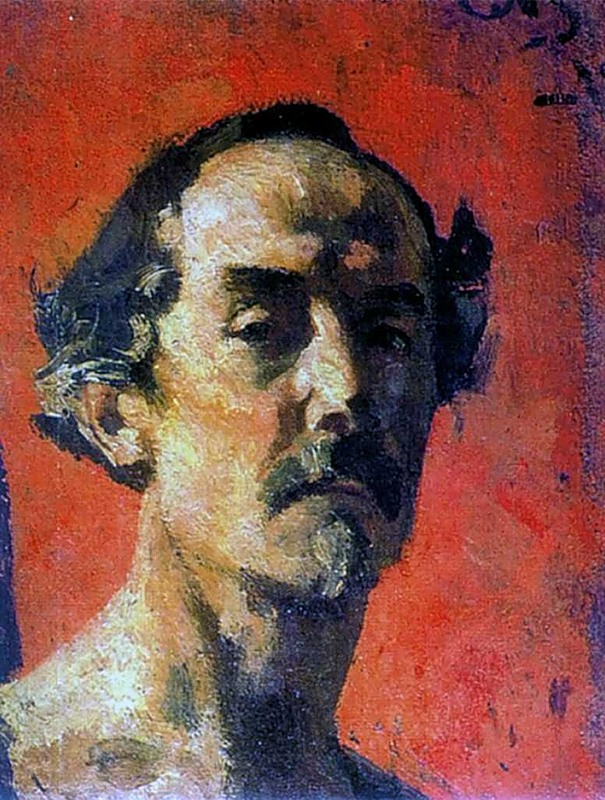
Sergey Malyutin

== See also ==
- List of Russian artists
- List of painters of Leningrad Union of Artists
- Saint Petersburg Union of Artists
- Russian culture
- 1937 in the Soviet Union

== Sources ==
- Выставка живописи, рисунка и скульптуры. Каталог. Л., 1937.
- Artists of Peoples of the USSR. Biobibliography Dictionary. Vol. 1. Moscow, Iskusstvo, 1970.
- Artists of Peoples of the USSR. Biobibliography Dictionary. Vol. 2. Moscow, Iskusstvo, 1972.
- Directory of Members of Union of Artists of USSR. Volume 1,2. Moscow, Soviet Artist Edition, 1979.
- Directory of Members of the Leningrad branch of the Union of Artists of Russian Federation. Leningrad, Khudozhnik RSFSR, 1980.
- Artists of Peoples of the USSR. Biobibliography Dictionary. Vol. 4 Book 1. Moscow, Iskusstvo, 1983.
- Directory of Members of the Leningrad branch of the Union of Artists of Russian Federation. Leningrad, Khudozhnik RSFSR, 1987.
- Персональные и групповые выставки советских художников. 1917-1947 гг. М., Советский художник, 1989.
- Artists of peoples of the USSR. Biobibliography Dictionary. Vol. 4 Book 2. Saint Petersburg: Academic project humanitarian agency, 1995.
- Link of Times: 1932 - 1997. Artists - Members of Saint Petersburg Union of Artists of Russia. Exhibition catalogue. Saint Petersburg, Manezh Central Exhibition Hall, 1997.
- Matthew C. Bown. Dictionary of 20th Century Russian and Soviet Painters 1900-1980s. London, Izomar, 1998.
- Vern G. Swanson. Soviet Impressionism. - Woodbridge, England: Antique Collectors' Club, 2001.
- Sergei V. Ivanov. Unknown Socialist Realism. The Leningrad School. Saint-Petersburg, NP-Print Edition, 2007. ISBN 5901724216, ISBN 9785901724217.
- Anniversary Directory graduates of Saint Petersburg State Academic Institute of Painting, Sculpture, and Architecture named after Ilya Repin, Russian Academy of Arts. 1915 - 2005. Saint Petersburg, Pervotsvet Publishing House, 2007.
