= Isaac Andreyevich Chatzkin =

Isaac Andreyevich Chatzkin (1832 – June 1902) was a Russian Jewish medical doctor.

He was born, died at Medical Society of Odessa and a corresponding member of the Medical Society of Kherson. Chatzkin distinguished himself by several literary productions. In 1858 his letters on physiology appeared in The Russian Messenger. In addition, he published Russian translations of the Introduction to Medical Science, by Professor Hermann Lebert, and Rudolf Virchow's Cellular Pathology. He died in Odessa, aged about seventy.
