= 1896 in Russia =

- Decades: 1870s; 1880s; 1890s; 1900s; 1910s
- See also: History of Russia; Timeline of Russian history; List of years in Russia

Events from the year 1896 in Russia.

== Incumbents ==
- Monarch – Nicholas II

== Events ==
- 1896 World Figure Skating Championships
- All-Russia Exhibition 1896
- Khodynka Tragedy
- Ādolfs Alunāns Theatre
- Coronation of Tsar Nicholas II

== Births ==
- January 2 – Dziga Vertov, filmmaker (d. 1954).
- April 15 – Nikolay Semyonov, chemist, Nobel Prize laureate (d. 1986).
- June 29 – Boris Podolsky, physicist (d. 1966).
- August 9 – Léonide Massine, ballet dancer and choreographer (d. 1979).
- August 27 – Leon Theremin, inventor (d. 1993).
- October 17 – Prince Roman Petrovich of Russia (d. 1978).
- November 17 – Lev Vygotsky, psychologist (d. 1934).
- December 1 – Georgi Zhukov, military leader, Marshal of the Soviet Union (d. 1974).
- December 12 – Vasily Gordov, general (d. 1950).

== Deaths ==
- 5 January - Ivan Gorbunov, writer and stage actor
- 24 January - Nikolay Strakhov, philosopher
- 3 February - Alexey Bogolyubov, landscape and seascape painter.
- 28 March - Anatoli Bogdanov, zoologist
- 17 May - Vera Zhelikhovskaya, writer
- 27 May - Aleksandr Stoletov, physicist
- 18 Aug - Aleksey Lobanov-Rostovsky, diplomat and statesman
- 13 October – Alexander Theodorowicz Batalin, botanist (b. 1847)
- Sergei Bershadski, historian and jurist.
