= 1895 in Russia =

- Decades: 1870s; 1880s; 1890s; 1900s; 1910s
- See also: History of Russia; Timeline of Russian history; List of years in Russia

Events from the year 1895 in Russia.

== Incumbents ==
- Monarch – Nicholas II

== Events ==
- 1895 Yaroslavl Great Manufacture strike
- Alchevsk
- Malyshev Factory
- Rīgas Vagonbūves Rūpnīca
- Russian Museum

== Births ==
- 15 November – Grand Duchess Olga Nikolaevna of Russia (died 1918)
