= Anna Barykova =

Russian poet, satirist and translator

Anna Pavlovna Barykova
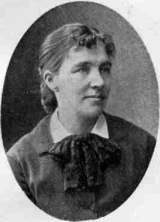
- Born: December 22, 1839; Saint Petersburg
- Died: May 31, 1893 (aged 53); Rostov on Don
- Writing career
- Language: Russian
- Genre: poetry
- Notable work: The Tale of How King Ahreyan Went to Complain to God

Anna Pavlovna Barykova (1839–1893) was a Russian poet, satirist and translator.

== Life ==
Anna Pavlovna Kamenskaia was born on 22 December 1839 in Saint Petersburg, the daughter of the writer Maria Kamenskaia and the granddaughter of the artist Fyodor Petrovich Tolstoy. She was educated at home, at a state boarding school and at the Catherine Institute in Saint Petersburg, where she started writing verse.

She married twice and had four children. She worked for Lev Tolstoy's publishing company as a translator, where she translated verse from French, German, English and Polish. Her first volume of poetry, My Muse, was published in 1878, when she was almost 40.

Supporting economic and political justice for Russia's peasantry, she became active on behalf of revolutionary groups in the early 1880s and was briefly placed under arrest. In 1883 she anonymously published 'How Tsar Akhreyan went to God to Complain', a verse satire. The work enjoyed a wide circulation as part of efforts to encourage peasants to turn to revolutionary activity. The first, illegal printing was by the People's Will publishers in Saint Petersburg; there were also Paris and Geneva editions in the 1890s. The name A. K. Tolstoy appeared on some of these printings.

In later life she advocated Tolstoyan ideas, supporting non-violence and vegetarianism. She was a close friend and correspondent with the publisher Vladimir Chertkov, a disciple of Tolstoy. In her letters she enthuses on the advantages of a vegetarian lifestyle.

Barykova died at Rostov on Don on 31 May 1893.

== Works ==
- Стихотворенія [My Muse], 1878
- (anon.) Сказка про то как царь Ахреян ходил Богу жаловаться [The Tale of How King Ahreyan Went to Complain to God], 1883.
- [A Votary of Aesthetics], 1884.
