= Aleksandr Medakin =

Soviet footballer

Personal information
- Full name: Aleksandr Georgiyevich Medakin
- Date of birth: 23 September 1937
- Place of birth: Moscow, Soviet Union
- Date of death: January 14, 1993 (aged 55)
- Place of death: Moscow, Russia
- Position: Defender

Youth career
- FC Spartak Moscow

Senior career*
Years	Team	Apps	(Gls)
1956–1963	FC Torpedo Moscow	138	(5)
1964–1965	FC Chornomorets Odessa	25	(1)
1966	FC Shinnik Yaroslavl	10	(0)

International career
1961	USSR	3	(0)

Managerial career
- 1967–1968: Znamya Truda Orekhovo-Zuyevo
- 1969–1970: Narzan Kislovodsk
- 1971–1972: Trudovye Rezervy Kislovodsk (youth team)
- 1973–1978: FC Torpedo Moscow (youth team)
- * Club domestic league appearances and goals

Aleksandr Georgiyevich Medakin (Russian: Александр Георгиевич Медакин; born September 23, 1937 – January 14, 1993) was a Soviet football player.

== Honours ==
- Soviet Top League winner: 1960.
- Soviet Cup winner: 1960.
- Top 33 players year-end list: 1959, 1960, 1961.

== International career ==
Medakin made his debut for USSR on May 21, 1961, in a friendly against Poland. He played in the 1962 FIFA World Cup qualifiers, but was not selected for the final tournament squad.
