= Rogachyovo =

Rogachyovo Рогачёво
- Village
- Location within Vologda Oblast Location within Russia
- Coordinates: 59°07′N 40°13′E
- Country: Russia
- Region: Vologda Oblast
- District: Vologodsky District
- Time zone: UTC+3:00

Rogachyovo (Russian: Рогачёво) is a rural locality (a village) in Staroselskoye Rural Settlement, Vologodsky District, Vologda Oblast, Russia. The population was 5 as of 2002. There are 2 streets.

== Geography ==
Rogachyovo is located 32 km southeast of Vologda (the district's administrative centre) by road. Zakharovo is the nearest rural locality.
