= 1894 in Russia =

- Decades: 1870s; 1880s; 1890s; 1900s; 1910s
- See also: History of Russia; Timeline of Russian history; List of years in Russia

Events happened in 1894 in Russia.

== Incumbents ==
- Monarch – Alexander III (until 1 November); Nicholas II (starting 1 November)

== Births ==
- March 30 – Nikolai Barabashov, Ukrainian astronomer. (d. 1971)
- April 15 – Nikita Khrushchev, Soviet politician, General Secretary of the Communist Party of the Soviet Union. (d. 1971)
- August 26 – Maksim Purkayev, Soviet general (d. 1953)

== Deaths ==
- Alexander III, monarch (born 1845)
- Nadezhda von Meck, patron of Peter Tchaikovsky (b. 1831)
