= David Klyshko =

Russian physicist

David Nikolaevich Klyshko (Давид Николаевич Клышко), (1929—2000) was a Russian physicist and professor. A highly regarded Physics professor at Moscow State University, was known for his imperative approach for Quantum Optics understanding. His most known contributions were in the field of quantum electronics and quantum information science.

His Habilitation thesis on the topic of spontaneous parametric down-conversion, "Multi-quantum and multi-particle transitions in radio spectroscopy and quantum radiophysics," was published in 1972. Upon release, the thesis was widely recognized as a breakthrough in multi-particle transitions.

Throughout the 1970s, Klyshko presented several more important theoretical contributions including the development of spontaneous parametric down-conversion theory, entanglement-based quantum imaging, nonlinear transformations in quantum optics, and the advanced wave model for describing correlations in photon interference experiments.
