= 2002 in Russia =

- Decades: 1980s; 1990s; 2000s; 2010s; 2020s
- See also: History of Russia; Timeline of Russian history; List of years in Russia

Events from the year 2002 in Russia.

== Incumbents ==
- President: Vladimir Putin
- Prime Minister: Mikhail Kasyanov

=== Governors ===
- Amur Oblast: Leonid Korotkov (Independent)
- Arkhangelsk Oblast: Anatoly Yefremov (ER)
- Astrakhan Oblast: Anatoly Guzhvin (ER)
- Belgorod Oblast: Yevgeny Savchenko (ER)
- Bryansk Oblast: Yury Lodkin (CPRF)
- Chelyabinsk Oblast: Pyotr Sumin (ER)
- Irkutsk Oblast: Boris Govorin (ER)
- Ivanovo Oblast: Vladimir Tikhonov (CPRF)
- Kaliningrad Oblast: Vladimir Yegorov (ER)
- Kaluga Oblast: Anatoly Artamonov (ER)
- Kemerovo Oblast: Aman Tuleyev (ER)
- Kirov Oblast: Vladimir Shaklein (Independent)
- Kostroma Oblast: Viktor Shershunov (CPRF)
- Kurgan Oblast: Oleg Bogomolov (Independent)
- Kursk Oblast: Aleksandr Mikhailov (CPRF)
- Leningrad Oblast: Valery Serdyukov (ER)
- Lipetsk Oblast: Oleg Korolyov (ER)
- Magadan Oblast: Valentin Tsvetkov (Independent, until October 18), Nikolai Dudov (Acting, ER, starting October 18)
- Moscow Oblast: Boris Gromov (ER)
- Murmansk Oblast: Yuri Yevdokimov (ER)
- Nizhny Novgorod Oblast: Gennady Khodyrev (ER)
- Novgorod Oblast: Mikhail Prusak (ER)
- Novosibirsk Oblast: Viktor Tolokonsky (Independent / ER ally)
- Omsk Oblast: Leonid Polezhayev (ER)
- Orenburg Oblast: Alexey Chernyshev (APR)
- Oryol Oblast: Yegor Stroyev (ER)
- Penza Oblast: Vasily Bochkarev (ER)
- Pskov Oblast: Yevgeny Mikhailov (ER)
- Rostov Oblast: Vladimir Chub (ER)
- Ryazan Oblast: Vyacheslav Lyubimov (CPRF)
- Sakhalin Oblast: Igor Farkhutdinov (Independent)
- Samara Oblast: Konstantin Titov (SPS)
- Saratov Oblast: Dmitry Ayatskov (ER)
- Smolensk Oblast: Aleksandr Prokhorov (CPRF, until May 19), Viktor Maslov (Independent / ER ally, starting May 19)
- Tambov Oblast: Oleg Betin (ER)
- Tomsk Oblast: Viktor Kress (ER)
- Tula Oblast: Vasily Starodubtsev (CPRF)
- Tver Oblast: Vladimir Platov (ER)
- Tyumen Oblast: Sergey Sobyanin (ER)
- Ulyanovsk Oblast: Vladimir Shamanov (ER)
- Vladimir Oblast: Nikolay Vinogradov (CPRF)
- Volgograd Oblast: Nikolai Maksyuta (CPRF)
- Vologda Oblast: Vyacheslav Pozgalyov (ER)
- Voronezh Oblast: Vladimir Kulakov (ER)
- Yaroslavl Oblast: Anatoly Lisitsyn (ER)
- Jewish Autonomous Oblast: Nikolay Volkov (ER)

== Events ==
- 21 January – Commercial television station TV6 closed down by the Russian government.
- 8 February–24 February – Russia competes at the Winter Olympics in Salt Lake City, United States, and wins 5 gold, 4 silver and 4 bronze medals.
- 4 March – Good Night, Little Ones! airs its first episode on its current home, Telekanal Rossiya, still airing on the VGTRK today.
- 12 May – An accident at the Baikonur Cosmodrome kills eight people and destroys a Buran spacecraft.
- 1 July – Bashkirian Airlines Flight 2937 from Moscow to Barcelona in Spain collides with DHL Flight 611 over Überlingen, Germany with 71 fatalities, mostly Russians.
- 25 September – Vitim event: a large meteorite crashes in the Vitim River basin in Siberia.
- 23 October – Moscow theater hostage crisis: 40 Chechen separatists seize a theatre in Moscow taking 850 hostages.
- 26 October – Moscow theater hostage crisis: Russian special forces storm the theatre killing the Chechens and over 100 hostages.
- 1 December – Turbomilk, a graphic design company is founded in Samara.

== Notable births ==
- 16 April – Dayana Kirillova, singer

== Notable deaths ==
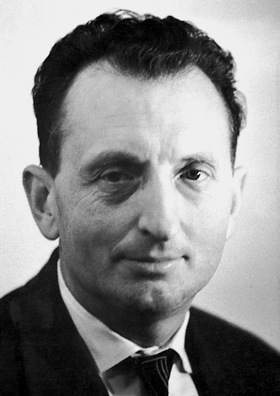
Aleksandr Mikhailovich Prokhorov

- 8 January – Aleksandr Mikhailovich Prokhorov, physicist, Nobel Prize laureate (born 1916)
- 10 March - Natalia Derzhavina, actress (born 1942)
- 1 Jule - Mikhail Krug, singer (born 1962)
- 19 September – Sergei Bodrov Jr., actor (born 1971)

== See also ==
- List of Russian films of 2002
