= Sergei Bershadski =

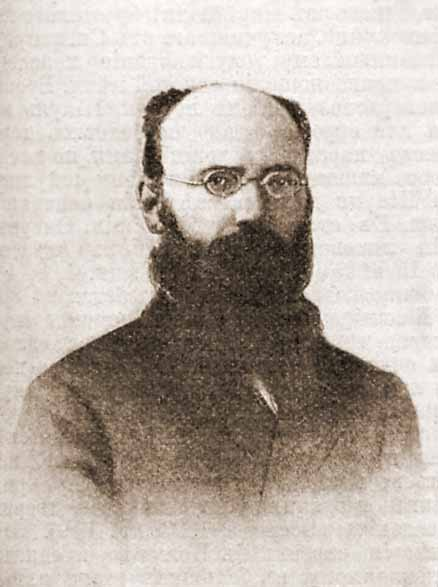
Sergei Bershadski

Sergei Aleksandrovich Bershadski (born at Berdyansk, March 30, 1850; died in St. Petersburg 1896) was a Russian historian and jurist.

== Life ==
He graduated from the Gymnasium of Kerch in 1868, and from the University of Odesa in 1872; he lectured at the University of St. Petersburg on the history of the philosophy of jurisprudence, from 1878 to 1883; and was appointed in 1885 assistant professor. At the Lyceum he delivered lectures also on the history of Russian jurisprudence; and at the Military Law School of St. Petersburg, on general jurisprudence. His famous work on the Lithuanian Jews, Litovskie Yevrei, published in 1883, is the first attempt in this field of historical investigation.

== Historian ==
Bershadski's father was a Greek Orthodox priest, while his great-grandfather on his mother's side, Kovalevski, was a hetman of the Cossacks. The Cossack traditions of his family found expression in prejudice against the Jews. He states, in his autobiographical notes, how in his childhood he learned of the horrors of the times of Bohdan Khmelnytsky in connection with the "homicidal Jews." From the old blind bandore-player (bandurist) at the fairs, from the reaper in the field, and from the peasant girls at the spinning-wheel on long winter evenings, he had heard the same tale of the Jew as "the defiler of the sanctuary." This incited him to make a study of the Jewish question. "I started," he declares, "as a confirmed Jew-hater." His Jewish colleagues at the university remember how he used to threaten them, saying, "Wait, some day I will expose you!" He went to the Archives and there began to search for material for his threatened exposures.

The result was his work, Opyt Novoi Postanovki Nyekotorykh Voprosov po Istorii Yevreistva v Polshye i Litvye, on some questions concerning the history of the Jews in Poland and Lithuania. This appeared in the Yevreiskaya Biblioteka. The result of further researches appeared soon after in the Voskhod, and in the Russki Yevrei, both of them Jewish publications. Bershadski became closely connected with Jewish topics, and most readers of these periodicals thought Berskadski was Jewish. Bershadski was a pioneer in recording a history the Jews in Lithuania. Soon afterward appeared his principal work, "Dokumenty i Regesty," etc., containing about 700 original documents and records from the early period of Jewish settlement in Lithuania, 1388–1569. About the same time he published his "History of the Lithuanian Jews." Though this work covers a period of only two hundred years, it endeavors to depict the entire course of Lithuanian-Jewish history.

== Works ==
His published works are:

- "Litovskie Yevrei, Istoriya ikh Yuridicheskavo i Obshchestvennavo Polozheniya v Litvye," St. Petersburg, 1883, being a history of the legal and social conditions of the Jews at Lithuania in 1388-1569
- "Dokumenty i Regesty k. Istorii Litovskikh Yevreyev," St. Petersburg, 1882, bearing upon the history of the Jews in Lithuania
- "A. E. Rebichkovich, Podskarbi Velikavo Knyazhestva Litovskavo," Kiev, 1888
- "Yevrei Korol Polski," St. Petersburg, 1890, concerning a Jew king of Poland.

Many articles on Jewish-Polish and Jewish-Lithuanian history in the periodicals were contributed by him in "Yevreiskaya Biblioteka," "Voskhod," "Russki Yevrei," and other periodicals.
