= 1898 in Russia =

- Decades: 1870s; 1880s; 1890s; 1900s; 1910s
- See also: History of Russia; Timeline of Russian history; List of years in Russia

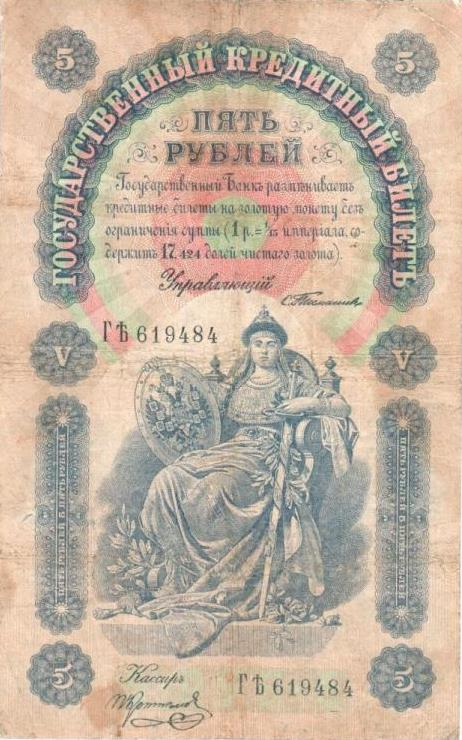
Russian Empire-1898-5-ruble-Signatures-Timashev-Koptelov-serial-ГЪ-619484-avers

Events from the year 1898 in Russia.

== Incumbents ==
- Monarch – Nicholas II

== Events ==
- 1898 influenza outbreak
- 1st Congress of the Russian Social Democratic Labour Party
- 25 April – Signing of Nishi–Rosen Agreement between the Russian Empire and the Empire of Japan concerning disputes over Korea.
- Central Committee compositions elected by the 1st–3rd congresses of the Russian Social Democratic Labor Party
- Founding of influential Mir iskusstva arts magazine.
- Russian Social Democratic Labor Party

== Births ==
- January 22 – Sergei Eisenstein, film director (d. 1948)
- February 20 – Semyon Kirlian, inventor (d. 1978)
- March 14 – Arnold Chikobava, Georgian linguist (d. 1985)
- July 13 – Ivan Triesault, Estonian-born American actor (d. 1980)
- August 12 – Maria Klenova, marine geologist (d. 1976)
- September 29 – Trofim Lysenko, biologist (d. 1976)
- October 20 – Sergi Jikia, Georgian historian and orientalist (d. 1993)

== Deaths ==
- May 22 – Nikolay Afanasyev, composer and violinist
