= Pochvovedenie =

Academic journal

Cover of the 1941 edition

Pochvovedenie (Russian: Почвоведение) is a Russian journal of soil science. The first issue was published in 1899.

The English translation is called Eurasian Soil Science. The journal headquarters is in Moscow.

== Bibliography ==
- Editorial Board. 2009. 110 years to the journal Pochvovedenie. Eurasian Soil Science 42 (1) 1–3.
