= Vladimir Lisunov =

Russian painter (1940–2000)

- Born: 21 March 1940; Leningrad, Russian SFSR, Soviet Union
- Died: 27 July 2000 (aged 60); Saint Petersburg, Russia
- Education: Repin Institute of Arts
- Known for: Painting

Vladimir Evgenievich Lisunov (Russian: Владимир Евгеньевич Лисунов; 21 March 1940 – 27 July 2000) was a Russian nonconformist artist, member of the Leningrad unofficial art tradition of the 1960s–1980s, poet, philosopher, romantic, and mystic known as Lis among artists and close friends.

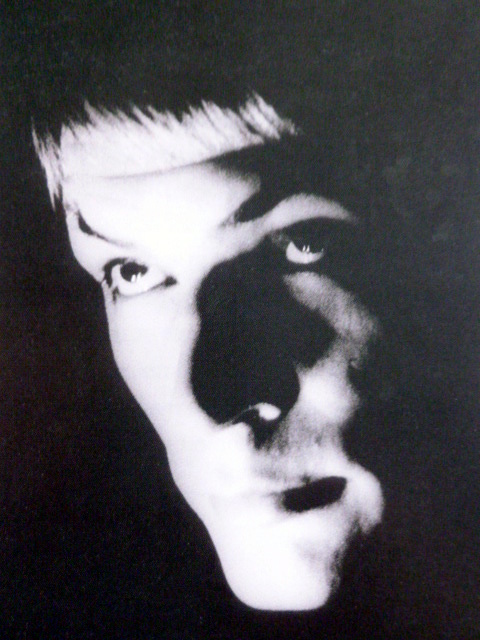
Vladimir Lisunov 1970.

== Biography ==
=== Childhood ===
Vladimir Evgenievich Lisunov was born in Leningrad on the spring equinox 21 March 1940. His father, Evgenii Ivanovich Lisunov (of Greek origin) was a professional financial expert, as was his mother Valentina Filipovna Lisunova (maiden name Minina) His sister Galina Evgenievna Lisunova was born in 1935.

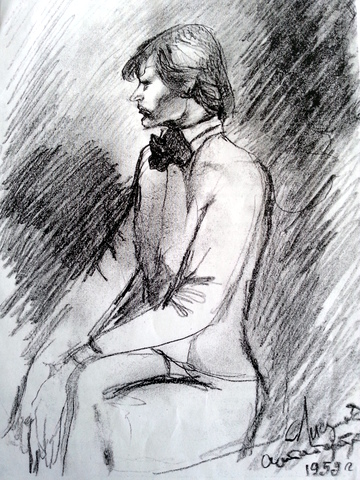
Self-portrait, 1959.

Vladimir Lisunov's early childhood took place during the war years, and he and his mother and sister had to live through the Nazi Siege of Leningrad, and also through bombardment and air raids of the besieged city. At the age of nine he began drawing, learnt to play the violin and wrote poetry, but by the age of twelve he had realised that his vocation was painting.

=== Studies ===
He finished secondary school in 1957. In 1958 he graduated from a children's art school in drawing, painting, sculpture and the history of art, and began studying in the faculty of painting at the Leningrad Repin Institute of Arts. His teachers there included Boris Ioganson, Smirnov and Kiparisov.

=== Work ===
He worked in the Leningrad Kirov Theatre of Opera and ballet, where he created sets, sketches of costumes, and makeup. He made several sketches of costumes for the ballerinas Natalia Makarova and Alla Osipenko. He earned extra money by making toys out of papier-mâché, which he decorated with paint. He also decorated porcelain in the Leningrad Porcelain Factory.

=== Creative work ===
Vladimir Lisunov spent his whole life in constant creative searching. He was always experimenting and honing his painting technique, and explored various themes. Some of Lisunov's paintings are full of mystical images and bring us in to other worlds, whereas others depict stories from the Bible or rural landscapes. He also created a series of drawings called: "Astral wanderings of the soul", "Landscapes of the soul", "Portrait of a woman", "Divas", "Aerial nudes", "Portraits of friends" and "Commuter train people".

Vladimir Lisunov was a virtuoso at both abstract and figurative compositions.

— Natalia Reginskaya, Album "Vladimir Lisunov, painting, graphics, poetry", original: draft produced by "Alpha Beta Translation Centre St Petersburg Ltd" 2008. ISBN 978-5-7931-0627-6

Wishing to distract himself from the harsh Soviet reality, Vladimir Lisunov immersed himself in mysticism and occultism, studying works by Papus, Blavatsky, and Castaneda, which had been copied out by hand, and this undoubtedly was reflected in his work.

Lisunov's world was a world of "astral wanderings", in which he tried to get away from grey mundaneness. The idea of infinity saturates all of the master's works, showing the viewer themes of the travels of a certain force, which unites worlds and spaces, in which the most important things are mystical beings "astral bodies", entities which lived before.

— Natalia Reginskaya,

Not having his own studio and confined by his living conditions, Lisunov painted some of his pictures on a stairway landing, enduring hostile looks from passing neighbours. On his days off he often went out to the countryside in the Leningrad region, where he painted his series of landscapes called "Little villages" and "Winter scenes". As regards Lisunov's style, he called himself a mystic symbolist.

And nevertheless Vladimir Lisunov's artistic style can be defined as mystic symbolism, in which the idea of infinity, a continuum of historic evolution, shows the movement of an astral phantom which unites worlds and epochs.

— Natalia Reginskaya, Album "Vladimir Lisunov, painting, graphics, poetry", original: draft produced by "Alpha Beta Translation Centre St Petersburg Ltd" 2008. ISBN 978-5-7931-0627-6

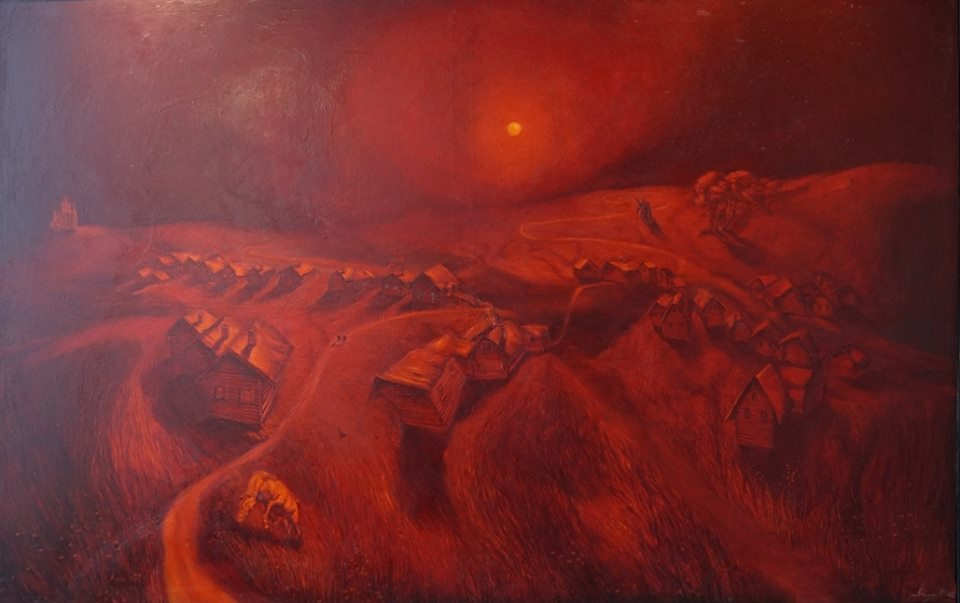
Moon fire, 1980. Canvas, oil. 130х200.

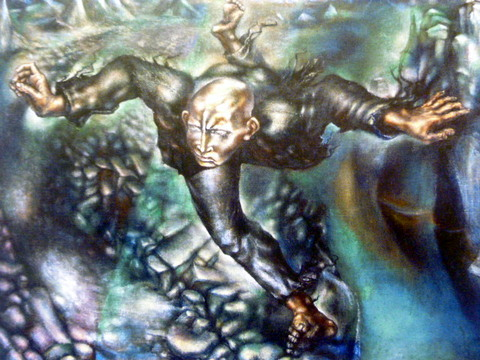
The fugitive, 1976. Canvas, oil. 108x187.

=== Destruction of exhibitions ===
Vladimir Lisunov's work went against Soviet Ideology's notions of art. For this reason he was forbidden to work as an artist. Attempts to organise official exhibitions of his work were unsuccessful. He was turned down even at the very initial stages of negotiations. In the mid 1960s, having begun to exhibit his work illegally, he came under the radar of the KGB, and as a result his personal exhibitions were smashed up, and his paintings barbarically destroyed by members of the militia. But in spite of the bans, threats and hounding on the part of the KGB, Vladimir Lisunov continued to work, and in 1970–71 took part in several joint exhibitions in the studio of the artist Vladimir Ovchinnikov, which were also smashed up by members of the militia. In 1975, Lisunov planned to take part in an exhibition of avant-gardists in the "Nevsky Palace of Culture", but on the eve of the opening he was arrested by members of the KGB, and as a result he spent several days in a cell in the Bolshoy Dom on Liteyny Avenue. In this way, Vladimir Lisunov's participation in the exhibition was sabotaged. But it was there, in the confines of the KGB, sitting in a cell, Vladimir Lisunov used a pencil to draw on paper a sketch which he later used when painting the picture 'The fugitive', which became a 'calling card' of his work. Unfortunately, most of Vladimir Lisunov's paintings were destroyed by members of the Soviet Militia, with the sanction of the KGB, during the destruction of his exhibitions.
Right up until 1985, Vladimir Lisunov was forced to be in a constant battle with the authorities as he attempted to assert his right to exhibit his works.

None of Leningrad's official artists in the era of stagnation went through such pressure on the part of the authorities as Lisunov did. Between 1969 and 1985 he did not have the opportunity to take part in a single official exhibition. The exception was only two or three small exhibits in private homes.

— Natalia Reginskaya,

=== "Ostrov" group ===
In 1985, Vladimir Lisunov joined an independent creative association of Leningrad artists called "Ostrov" (English: "The Island").

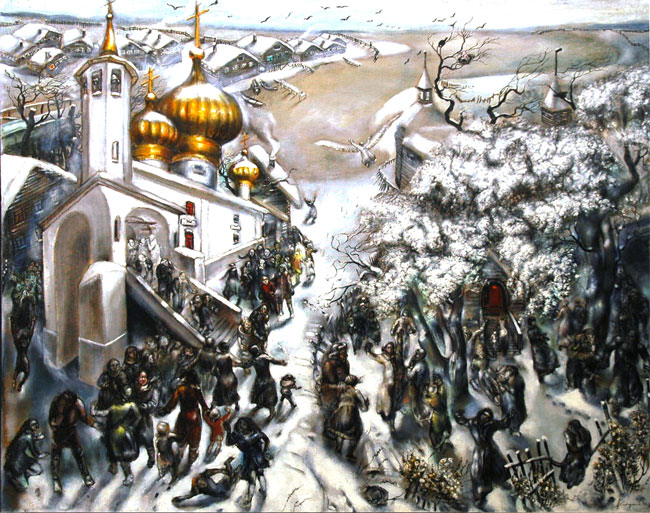
Epiphany,1996. Canvas, oil. 90х118.

Twenty years brought 'The Island' both worldwide recognition for some individual artists, and also notable losses. One of the most vivid members of the group, the legendary personality of the St Petersburg Bohemia of the 1990s was the artist Vladimir Lisunov. Strikingly handsome, he felt linked by blood with the St Petersburg Silver Age, and always wore a full-length fox fur coat and a wide-brimmed romantic hat. In his pictures Venuses swung on swings, strange philosophizing people wandered around fantastical and slummy cities, his winter scenes exuded longing for his native outskirts of the Leningrad region, in them thoughtful animals, wistful and cosy, and lost country folk came to the foreground. A short documentary film was made about Lisunov when he was alive, in which he recites his convoluted, passionate poetry, talks about his love of fishing, and some kind of morose nuclear energy wafts from the film, and it is clear that Petersburg in the perestroika of the 1990s was the kind of concentration of spirit and creativity which only happens once in a hundred years. Vladimir Lisunov was mysteriously killed by an unknown assailant in 2000. A wave of mysterious killings of artists swept through St Petersburg at the time, as if the city was ridding itself of its already fading stage of turbulent underground, making the transition to a new life, to the gibbering, insipid 2000s.

=== Changes ===
In the same year 1985, with the beginning of perestroika in the Soviet Union, changes began, and forbidden artists began to be treated with more tolerance. They were given permission to exhibit their work, and Vladimir Lisunov got the chance to take part in official exhibitions. During this time he worked a lot, and made plans for future creative work, but a tragic occurrence was to destroy everything.

=== Death ===
On 27 July 2000 Vladimir Lisunov's life was cut short at the hand of a murderer. The crime was never solved.

== Personality and style ==
Contemporaries who knew Lisunov often called him "Lis", and remember him as a cult figure in the Leningrad underground. Commonly described as naturally handsome, with a slim figure, he almost always wore a floor-length overcoat with a scarlet scarf thrown carelessly around his neck. His head was always adorned with a wide-brimmed hat. He did not change his style over the course of his whole life, it was something of a 'calling card,' an inextricable part of his personality. Those who only saw Vladimir Lisunov once often remembered his appearance for many years.

In his person, lifestyle, methods of self-presentation and in his profession itself – Lisunov was an artist – was focussed complete Petersburg aestheticism.

— Sofia Azarkhi,

== Personal life ==
In 1971 Vladimir Lisunov married Irina Sarapulova, a student at the Mukhina Art and Industry Academy, and she became his Wife, Friend and Muse for the rest of his life. Irina Sarapulova currently lives in Saint Petersburg, promotes Vladimir Lisunov's work, and organises exhibitions.

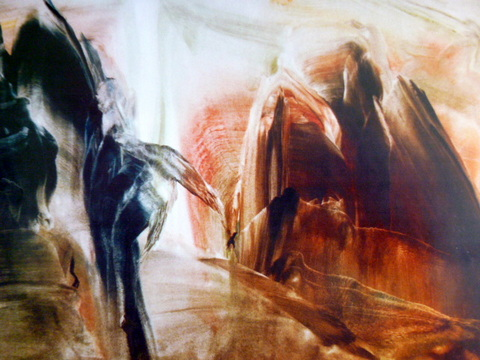
Crystal mirages, 1983. Paper, watercolor, gouache, 49x42.

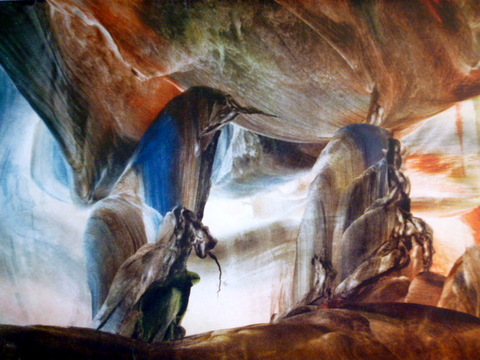
Mirror delirium of wanderings, 1982.Paper, watercolor, gouache, 58х43.

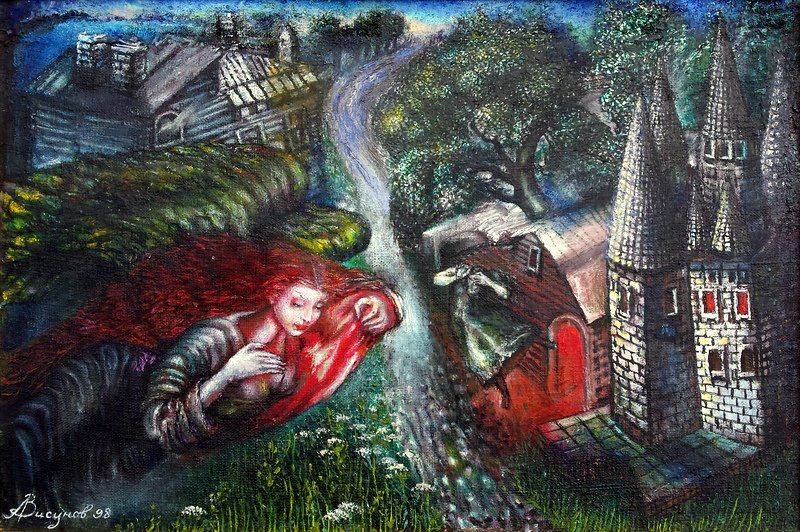
Otradnoe, 1998. Canvas, oil, 55x37.

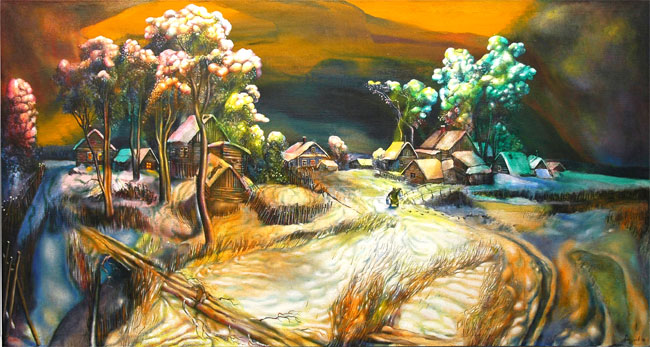
Thaw, 1992. Canvas, oil, 90x181.

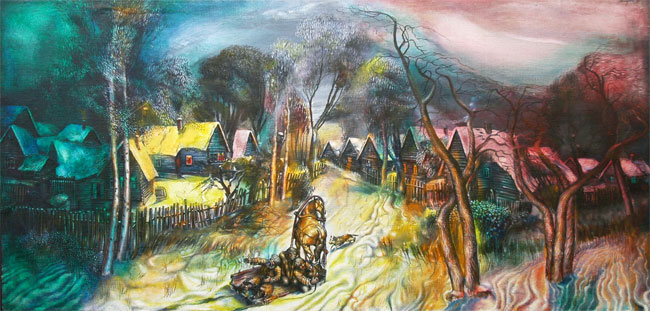
Christmas, 1992. Canvas, oil, 81х77.

== Exhibitions ==
=== Personal exhibitions ===
- 1965 – Leningrad Institute of Textile and Light Industry of S.M. Kirov
- 1967 – University of Tartu, (Estonia)
- 1968 – Moscow State University, Moscow Institute of Chemical Engineering (Moscow); The Student Campus (Leningrad)
- 1969 – Leningrad State University, Faculty of Journalistics (Leningrad); The Student Campus (Leningrad)
- 1988 – "Metamorphoses by Vladimir Lisunov", Pishchevikov Culture Hall (Leningrad)
- 1990 – The Writers' Hall (18, Voinov Street, Leningrad) on the occasion of the 50th Anniversary
- 2000 – PEN Club (3, Dumskaya Street, St Petersburg) on the occasion of the 60th Anniversary; Shuvalov Palace (21, Fontanka, St Petersburg), posthumous exhibition
- 2007 – Museum of Nonconformist Art (10, Pushkinskaya Street, Saint Petersburg), paintings
- 2008 – Museum of Nonconformist Art (10, Pushkinskaya Street, Saint Petersburg), graphic art
- 2009 – Landscape in the works of Vladimir Lisunov – Gallery "Artliga" – Saint Petersburg
- 2010 – The Jewish centre (Saint Peterburg) on the occasion of the 70th Anniversary
- 2013 – (7 – 27 January) – Gallery "Dvoika" (Saint Peterburg)
- 2013 – (21 March – 14 April) – Gallery "Dvoika" (Saint Petersburg)
- 2014 – (31 March – 30 April) – Art-Ploshyadka "Art Muza Loft" (Saint Petersburg)

=== Joint exhibitions ===
==== With "The Island" Group ====
- 1987 – Culture Hall of Tsuriupa (Leningrad); Yelagin Palace on Pontonnaya Street (Leningrad); TV Centre (Leningrad)
- 1988 – On Pontonnaya Street; "Spring '88" Moscow; Pishchevikov Culture Hall (Leningrad), Kuybyshev
- 1989 – "Spring '89" (Gallery of the Artists Club "Five Corners", Pishchevikov Culture Hall)
- 1990 – "Ostrov '90" (The State Museum of the History of St Petersburg)
- 1991 – Saint Petersburg State University
- 2008 – "The Island 20 Years Later", Exhibition Hall of the Artists Union (St Petersburg)

==== Jointly with the Association of Experimental Fine Arts ====
- 1995 – "The 10th Anniversary of "The Island" Group" (Museum of the Samoylov Family)
- 1987 – Exhibition Hall of the Artists Union of the Russian Soviet Federative Socialist Republic on the Okhta, personal exhibition (Leningrad)
- 1988 – Exhibition Hall "The Swedish Fortress" (Narva, Estonia)

=== Apartment exhibitions ===
- 1970 – 1971 – Studio of Vladimir Ovchinnikov (Kustarny Lane, Leningrad)
- 1975 – Apartment of Turovsky on the Okhta, personal exhibition (Leningrad)
- 1980 – Apartment of Alla Osipenko and John Markovsky on Zheliabov Street (Leningrad)

=== Other Joint Exhibitions ===
- 1978 – Biennale (Venice, Italy)
- 1985 – "10th Anniversary of Leningrad Avant Garde" (Lenexpo, The Harbour); The Youth Palace
- 1986 – The Youth Palace (Leningrad)
- 1987 – 1991 – Exhibition Hall "The Swedish Fortress" (Narva, Estonia)
- 1987 – 1988 – Theatre of Leninsky Komsomol (Leningrad); The Railway Workers Club; "Modern Leningrad Art" (Manege); Auction-Exhibition in Lenexpo "In the Memory of Vladimir Vysotsky"
- 1990 – "Leningrad: Traditions and Perestroika" (Gallery on Rue De Richelieu, Paris)
- 1993 – "All St Petersburg ‘93" (Manege)
- 1995 – Auction-Exhibition, Joint-Stock Company "Pargolovsky"; Art-Mosaic (Shuvalov Palace, 21, Fontanka)
- 2000 – Winter Salon "Happy New Year" (City Exhibition Hall "Nevograf", 3, Nevsky Prospekt)
- 2001 – Spring Salon "Under the Female Sign" (City Exhibition Hall "Nevograf", 3, Nevsky Prospekt.
- 2013 – VII International Biennale "Art-Bridge-Watercolor" (St-Petersburg, Russia)

== The works in museums and collections ==
The works of artist Vladimir Lisunov can be found in private collections in St Petersburg, Moscow, as well as in Estonia, France, Germany, Switzerland, Denmark, Norway, Netherlands, Italy, Finland, Poland, US, Canada, Australia and Ireland.

== Selected works ==
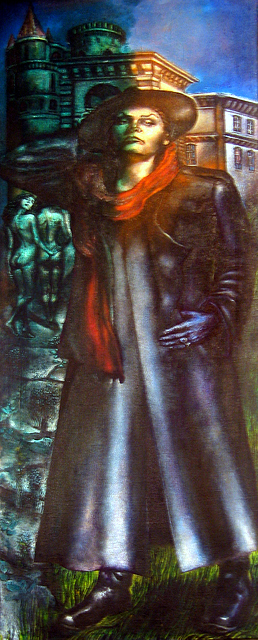
Self-portrait, 1993. Canvas, oil. 124х45,5.

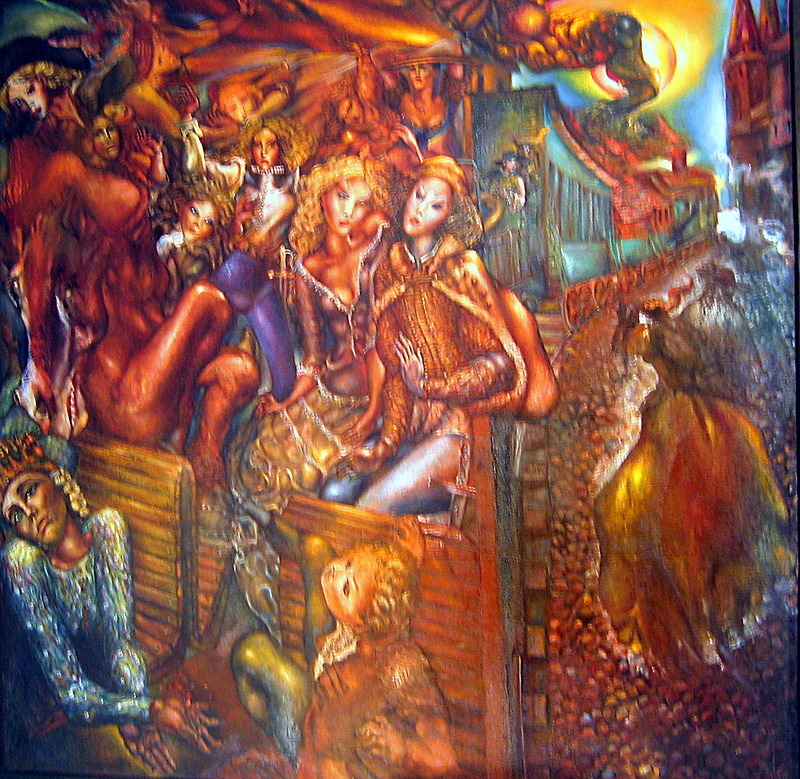
The train to faraway childhood, 1980. Canvas, oil. 130x130.

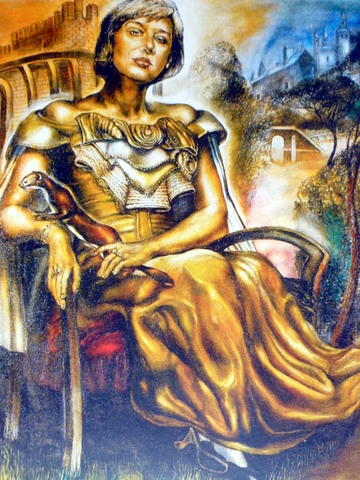
Portrait of the artist's wife with weasel, 1992. Canvas, oil. 106х97.

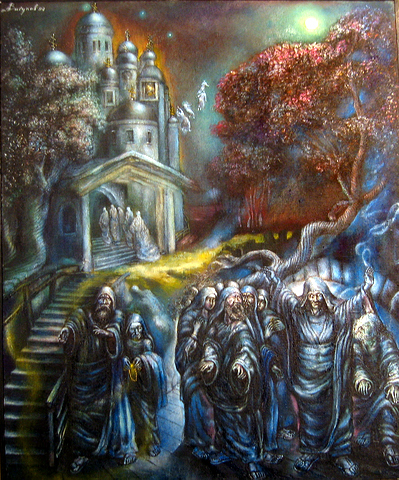
Strange night visions, 1999. Canvas, oil. 105х85.

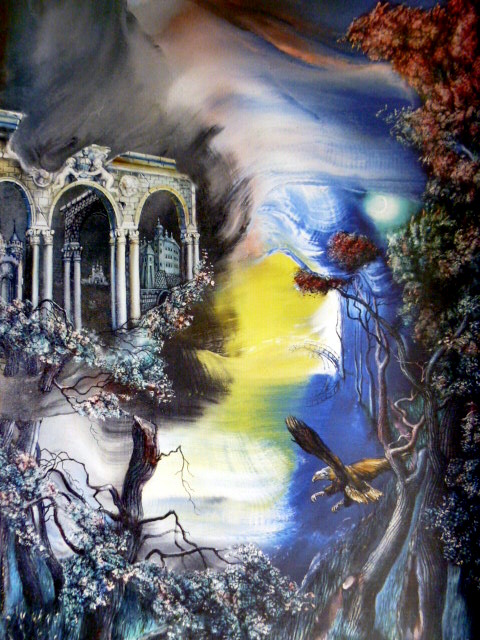
The moon drawing in the down, 1999. Canvas, oil. 118х89.

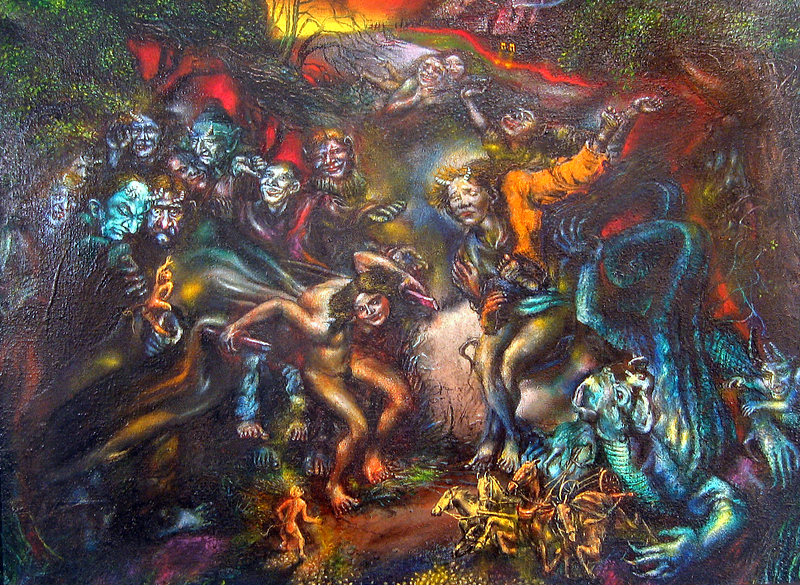
Forest visions, 1995. Canvas, oil. 60х81.

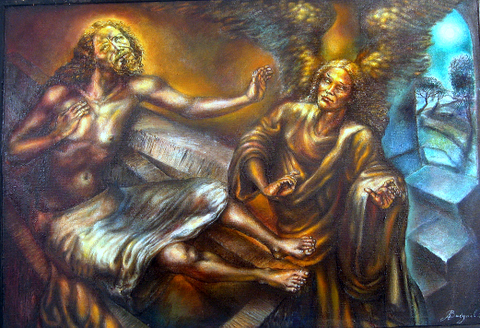
Resurrection, 1995. Canvas, oil. 80х100.

== Poetry ==
In 2008 the publishing house 'Borey-Art', released a collection of Lisunov's poetry which contained fifty two poems and three long poems.

== Filmography ==
- In 1989 he acted in the film "The Moment…", a joint production between Odessa Film Studio and Georgia Film Studio.
- In 1990 he acted in the motion picture "A Crystal Story" (Lenfilm), in the role of a wizard.

== Literature ==
- In 2008 the album "Vladimir Lisunov, painting, graphics, poetry" was produced, the author-compiler was Natalia Reginskaya, the original was a draft produced by "Alpha Beta Translation Centre St Petersburg Ltd". ISBN 978-5-7931-0627-6
- In 2012 Sofia Azarkhi's book, "Fashionable people" was published by Ivan Limbakh publishers (St Petersburg). One of the chapters of the book is about Vladimir Lisunov. ISBN 978-5-89059-175-3
- In 2009 Aleksandr Radashkevich's novel "Lis, or the Inferno" (Aletheia publishers, St Petersburg). The prototypes of the main characters, the artist Pavel Lisanov and Karina, are Vladimir Lisunov and Irina Sarapulova.
