= Ivan Kataev =

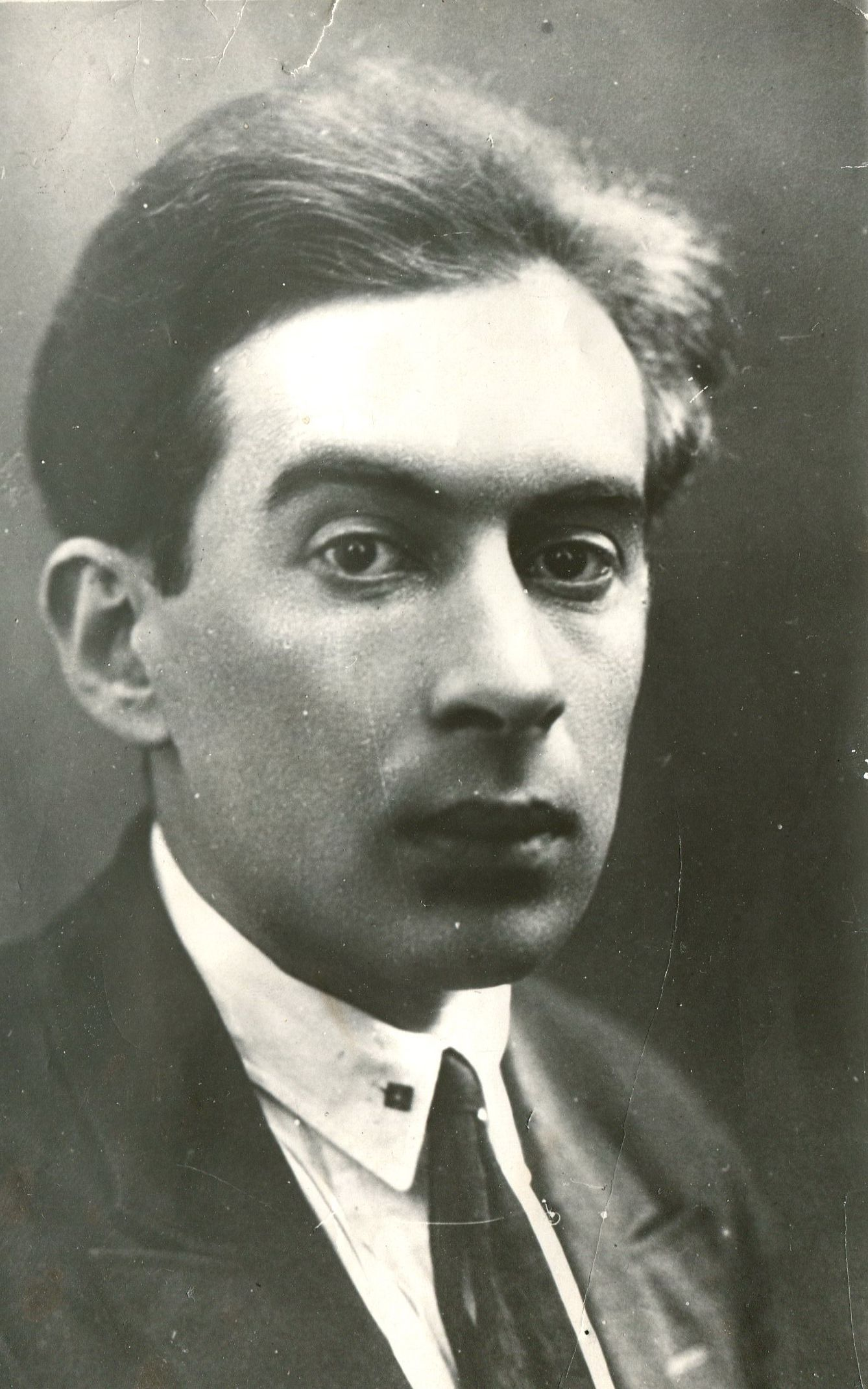
- Born: 27 May 1902; Moscow, Russian Empire
- Died: 19 August 1937 (aged 35); Moscow, Soviet Union
- Education: Moscow State University
- Occupations: writer, journalist

Ivan Ivanovich Kataev (Russian: Ива́н Ива́нович Ката́ев; 27 May 1902 – 19 August 1937) was a Soviet novelist, short story writer, and journalist.

== Early years ==
Kataev was born in Moscow. His father Ivan was a historian and university professor and the uncle of Andrey Kolmogorov, and his mother was the niece of Pyotr Kropotkin. Kataev lost his mother early.

Kataev studied at a gymnasium in Moscow and Suzdal. In 1919 he joined the Russian Communist Party (Bolsheviks) and the Red Army, fighting against Anton Denikin. After leaving the military, he worked at a newspaper, was one of the organizers of the Theater of Revolutionary Satire (Теревсат), and studied economics at Moscow State University.

== Literary career ==
In 1923 he joined the Russian Association of Proletarian Writers (RAPP). He was a member of the board of the Union of Soviet Writers since 1934. Along the way, he worked at the publishing house “City and Village”, publishing stories and essays.

Kataev's first works were published in 1921. From 1926 to 1932 he was the leader of the literary group Pereval, which included Eduard Bagritsky, Mikhail Prishvin and Pyotr Pavlenko, among others. His works include the novellas The Heart (1928), Milk (1930), and The Encounter (1934). and the collections of essays Movement (1932) and The Man on the Mountain (1934).

He made numerous long trips as a journalist to the Kuban, Altai Republic, Kola Peninsula, Armenia and many other places, which provided him with material for his fiction.

== Disgrace, arrest and execution ==
Ilya Ehrenburg recalled that Kataev was among those accused of "formalist stumbling" by the regime in the mid-1930s. His novel Milk (Молоко) was attacked on ideological grounds as a work that preached religion. Kataev's works were attacked throughout the following years, eventually contributing to his arrest and execution as an "enemy of the people" in 1937.

As the Great Purge started to gather momentum, Kataev increasingly came under scrutiny "because he had given money and friendship to various disgraced Trotskyites". In 1936 he was expelled from the CPSU(b) as an “alien element.” He was arrested on March 18, 1937, and accused of participating in an anti-Soviet counter-revolutionary terrorist organization. His name was included in Stalin's execution list, dated August 10, 1937 and signed by senior state security official Vladimir Tsesarsky. On August 19, 1937, the verdict was formally approved at a meeting of the Military Collegium of the Supreme Court of the USSR; he was executed the same day.

He was rehabilitated posthumously on April 18, 1956. After this, his widow, Maria Terentyeva-Kataeva, was issued a falsified death certificate, in which the date of his death was indicated as May 2, 1939, and there were dashes in the columns “Place of death” and “Cause of death”.

== English translations ==
- Immortality, from Anthology of Soviet Short Stories, Vol 1, Progress Publishers, Moscow, 1976.
- The Wife, from Great Soviet Short Stories, Dell, 1990. ISBN 0440331668
