= Iosif Kablits =

Russian revolutionary (1848–1893)

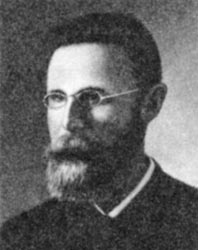
- Born: 12 July 1848; Trebeshovo, Kovno Governorate, Russian Empire
- Died: 16 October 1893 (aged 45); Saint Peterburg, Russian Empire
- Occupations: publicist, sociologist, political activist

Iosif Ivanovich Kablits (Russian: Ио́сиф Ива́нович Ка́блиц; 12 July 1848 – 16 October 1893) was a Russian revolutionary activist, later sociologist and publicist, writing under the pseudonym Yuzov (Юзов).

== Biography ==
Born on 12 July 1848 in the village of Trebeshovo, Kovno Governorate to a noble Lutheran family, Kablitz studied law at the Saint Vladimir University in Kiev in 1866–1872. In 1874 in Saint Petersburg he formed an underground circle of Mikhail Bakunin's followers and for a while propagated the idea of storming the Winter Palace and assassinating the Tzar family. In 1875 he had to leave the country and spent some time abroad so as to avoid the arrest. In the late 1870s, Kablitz drifted towards the political center, became a member of the narodnik movement and started writing political and economical essays, mostly for Slovo and Nedelya.

Kablitz's best known books are "Russian Dissidents. Old Believers and Spiritual Christians" (Russian: Русские диссиденты: Староверы и духовные христиане; 1881), "The Foundations of the Narodnik Movement" (Russian: Основы народничества; 1882) and "The Intelligentsia and the People in Russia's Social Life" (Russian: Интеллигенция и народ в общественной жизни России; 1885). Regarding the artel as the basis for the rural economics in Russia, he championed the concept of peasant obschina and criticized the intelligentsia for selfishness, individualism and its inability to work among and with the people. In 1886–1893 he served at the Russian State Control.

Kablitz died in Saint Petersburg on 16 October 1893.
