= Ādolfs Alunāns Theatre =

Theatre in Latvia

Coordinates: 56°39′13.88″N 23°43′24.08″E

Ādolfs Alunāns Theatre (Latvian: Ādolfa Alunāna teātris) is a theatre in Jelgava, Latvia that was established in 1896.
