= Aleksandr Kondratov =

Alexandr Mikhailovych Kondratov (Russian: Алекса́ндр Миха́йлович Кондра́тов; October 3, 1937 in Smolensk – April 16, 1993 in St.Petersburg) was a Russian linguist, biologist, journalist and poet. He wrote many books on subjects as varied as ancient and modern languages, history, mathematics, paleontology, geology, cryptozoology, and Atlantis. He also wrote poetry. He wrote a monography about dinosaurs purportedly surviving into modern times.

== Selected bibliography ==
=== Atlantis ===
- Атлантиды моря Тетис (Atlantides of the Tethys Sea), 1986
- Атлантиды пяти океанов (Atlantides of the Five Oceans, 1987
- Атлантиды ищите на шельфе (Seek the Atlantis on the Shelf), 1988 - a trilogy

=== Other submerged lands ===
- Атлантика без Атлантиды (The Atlantic Ocean without Atlantis, 1972)
- Адрес — Лемурия? (The Address - Lemuria?), 1978
- Была земля Берингия (There was Beringia), 1981
- Была земля Арктида (There was Arktida), 1983

=== Ancient civilizations ===
- Великаны острова Пасхи (Giants of The Easter Island), 1966
- Погибшие цивилизации (Vanished Civilizations), 1968
- Когда молчат письмена. Загадки древней Эгеиды (When letters are silent - Mysteries of ancient Egeis), 1970 with V. V. Shevoroskin (В.В.Шеворошкин)
- Этруски — загадка номер один (The Etruscan civilization - Mystery Number One, 1977)
- Великий потоп. Мифы и реальность (The Deluge. Myths and Reality), 1982

=== Paleontology ===
- Динозавра ищите в глубинах (Seek the Dinosaur in the Depths), 1984
- Шанс для динозавра (The Chance for the Dinosaur), 1992

=== Oceanology ===
- Тайны трех океанов (The Riddles of Three Oceans), 1971
- Загадки Великого океана (Mysteries of The Pacific Ocean), 1974
- Следы на шельфе (Tracks on the Shelf), 1981

=== Mathematics ===
- Математика и поэзия (Mathematics and Poetry), 1962
- Число и мысль (Number and Mind), 1963
- Электронный разум (The Electronic Reason), 1987
