= 1899 in Russia =

- Decades: 1870s; 1880s; 1890s; 1900s; 1910s
- See also: History of Russia; Timeline of Russian history; List of years in Russia

Events from the year 1899 in Russia.

== Incumbents ==
- Monarch – Nicholas II

== Events ==
- 1899 Russian student strike
- Akyaka Railway Station
- Peter the Great St. Petersburg Polytechnic University
- Pochvovedenie
- The Development of Capitalism in Russia by Vladimir Lenin is published.

== Births ==
- January 14 – Georg Witt, film producer (d. 1973)
- March 18 – Max Alpert, photographer (d. 1980)
- April 22 – Vladimir Nabokov, Russian-born American writer (d. 1977)
- April 24 – Oscar Zariski, mathematician (d. 1986)
- May 31 – Leonid Leonov, novelist and playwright (d. 1994)
- June 26 – Grand Duchess Maria Nikolaevna of Russia (d. 1918)
- September 1 – Andrei Platonov, Soviet writer (d. 1951)
- October 22 – Nikolay Bogolyubov, actor (d. 1980)
- October 27 – Mikhail Zharov, actor and director (d. 1981)
- October 29 – Akim Tamiroff, Armenian actor (d. 1972)
- November 8 – Yitzhak Lamdan, Russian-born Israeli poet and columnist (d. 1954)

== Deaths ==
- January 21 – Mikhail Annenkov, nobleman, author, military officer, and engineer (b. 1835)
- January 30 – Ivan Velio, statesman, Active Privy Councillor (b. 1830)
- March 4 – Vasyl Bilozersky, political and cultural activist, journalist, scientist, and pedagogue (b. 1825)
- May 11 – Varvara Rudneva, physician (b. 1844)
- September 20 – Anatoly Vaneyev, revolutionary (b. 1872)
