= 1897 in Russia =

- Decades: 1870s; 1880s; 1890s; 1900s; 1910s
- See also: History of Russia; Timeline of Russian history; List of years in Russia

Events from 1897 in Russia.

== Incumbents ==
- Monarch – Nicholas II

== Events ==
- Russian Empire Census
- World Chess Championship 1897
- Belushya Guba
- Moscow Art Theatre

== Births ==
- February 25 – Mikhail Krichevsky, Ukrainian unverified supercentenarian, last Imperial Russian Army veteran of WWI (d. 2008)
- June 7 – Kirill Meretskov, Soviet military officer, Marshal of the Soviet Union (d. 1968)
- June 10 – Tatiana Nikolaevna, Grand Duchess of Russia (d. 1918)
- July 7 – Mikhail Kovalyov, Soviet Army colonel-general (d. 1967)
- October 8 – Rouben Mamoulian, Armenian-born American film, theatre director (d. 1987)
- November 4 – Dmitry Pavlov, Soviet general (d. 1941)
