= Vladimir Bougrine =

Russian painter

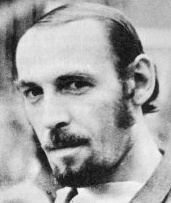
Vladimir Bougrine (1938-2001)

Vladimir Bougrine (Russian: Владимир Бугрин) also known as Wladimir Bugrin (10 June 1938, Leningrad - 10 August 2001, St. Petersburg) was a Russian painter.

== Biography ==
Vladimir was the second child of two academic painters. His father, Alexander Bougrine, was an icon restorer and his painter mother Nathalie Anikina also worked at the Hermitage. He was brought up in two rooms at his ancestral home on the Neva River, transformed after the Revolution into community accommodation.

When the German army surrounded Leningrad in September 1941 beginning the 900-day Siege, Vladimir and his sister suffered the famine and the cold that would kill mostly the young and the old.

Their food ration was 125 grams of bread a day, and Volodia spent his days like the other children looking for food. They were left alone, their parents working or fighting; they ate what they could find, one day he consumed a jar of mustard and the hospital doctors saved his life. He was fortunate, a quarter of the population died, most of them children, but they were the older ones, whose food needs to survive were greater.

Between 1956 and 1959, Vladimir attended the Mukhina Institute for art and industrial design and from 1960-65 the academy of Beaux-Arts in Leningrad.

He then taught art and theatre sets, painted portraits, and restored icons. From the beginning of the 1970s he painted religious topics, against state orders. Like other painters in the Soviet Union, he was courted by Western diplomats and journalists who had their own agenda. From them, he obtained a gilded picture of life in the West. When painters in the Soviet Union tried to break the yoke of the state which commissioned portraits of political leaders and forbade creativity, dissident artists gathered in a movement for free creation and exhibition of their work. Non-conformist artists in Moscow attempted to reach the public by organising in the open-air what was to become known as the Bulldozer Exhibition on 15 September 1974. Police dispersed the artists and their exhibits.

detail of Vladimir's style

In Leningrad, Vladimir and his mother were among the leaders of the same movement. When the authorities learnt of the exhibition that was being organised, they placed him under house arrest, with police at the door. Vladimir left through a window and with a group of friends marched towards the square where the exhibition would take place. But the square was full of police, and no-one could approach.

Although these attempts were thwarted, the artists continued their fight for free expression. The more they fought, the greater the repression from the Soviet authorities. Vladimir was imprisoned in Leningrad, and then, like many other dissident painters, was expelled from his native land. As emigration from the Soviet Union was forbidden for all but Jewish people, the dissident painters, seen as dangerous because rebellious, were expelled as Jewish emigrants.

The plane stopped in Vienna. Those who did not continue to Israel were housed in a transitville in the city; here they awaited visas for emigration to either America or France. Vladimir Bougrine had much success in Vienna thanks to his patron Princess Ghislaine Windisch-Graetz and his award-winning portrait of Cardinal Koenig of Vienna.

But his intention was to come to France, where he had friends, the Droin family, who had given him support after his imprisonment in Leningrad.

In 1977, a few months after arriving in Paris, the French Ministry of Culture introduced him to the Moulin d'Ande, a community of writers, musicians and film-makers, run by Suzanne Lipinska and Maurice Pons. The Moulin was to play a central role in his life thereafter.

He was awarded a studio at the Cité des Arts in Paris, and continued the rest of his life to paint in Paris, Saint Germain en Laye, Aigremont and Normandy. He continued painting in St. Petersburg in the last two years of his life.

From 1969, Vladimir Bougrine participated in over 40 exhibitions, 12 personal ones, in Leningrad, Vienna, Salzburg, Paris, Tokyo, Milan, Bologna, Bari, Bochum, Hamburg, Aubonne, Switzerland, and in the following museums: Russian Museum, Leningrad; Cathedral and diocesan museum, Vienna; Musée du Luxembourg, Paris; Museum of Tokyo, Japan; Museum of the city Bochum, BRD.

When Vladimir was granted French nationality in 1984, he was able to return to his homeland to visit his family in St. Petersburg. Although he and his fellow-artists were instrumental in Glasnost which resulted from the spirit of rebellion that was fermenting throughout the land, he was much distressed by the wild capitalism that resulted in gangs of famished children who followed him around the city on his return. He then began to regret the change in society and politics and the deleterious effect on children and old people.

Vladimir died in St. Petersburg on 10 August 2001.
