= Sergey Nagovitsyn =

Russian singer (1968–1999)

Background information
- Birth name: Sergey Borisovich Nagovitsyn
- Born: 22 July 1968
- Origin: Perm, Perm Oblast, Russian SFSR, Soviet Union
- Died: 20 December 1999 (aged 31) near Kurgan, Kurgan Oblast, Russia
- Genres: Russian chanson
- Occupations: Singer
- Instruments: singing
- Years active: 1991–1999
- Website: http://nagovicin.com

Sergey Borisovich Nagovitsyn (Russian: Серге́й Борисович Наговицын; 22 July 1968 in Perm, RSFSR, USSR – 20 December 1999 near Kurgan, Russia) was a Russian singer, composer and author of Russian chanson style songs.

== Life ==
Nagovitsyn was born in the city of Zakamsk. In high school, he studied at the "mean" level. But he was very athletic (play forms, a candidate to Sports Master in boxing). He started playing the guitar in 1985 under the influence of Alexander Rozenbaum.

After school, Sergei went to the Perm Medical Institute, but he was drafted to the army. Sergei Nagovitsyn was deployed to Batumi, to the "hot spot".

After having been discharged from the Armed Forces Sergei Nagovitsyn got a job in the Permian "GorGaz" (Perm City Gas Service). In the bowels of the organization amateur rock band existed, it did not ignore thieves folklore. It was destined to make the first arrangements of the songs of Sergei Nagovitsyn (album "Full Moon".

"Moon" played a significant role. In 1992 producing center of Moscow "Russian Show" offered Nagovitsyn to sign a contract on record. Nagovitsyn signed but did not move to Moscow.

In the early 1990s, unique "Nagovitsyn's" style was formed – an alloy of urban romance, thug lyrics and disco rhythms, plus, of course, the peculiar timbre of the voice of Sergei.

By early 1994 16 songs already were written. Half of them came in the first album, "Town Meeting" (1994), recorded in a professional studio.

Then there was the album "Dori-Dori" of songs written in 1995–96. Song "Dori-Dori" from that album came in sight of St. Petersburg Radio Russian Chanson ". National-wide recognition of the musician started from "Dori-Dori".

Sergei Nagovitsyn called Arcady Severny, Vladimir Vysotsky, Alexander Rosenbaum, and Alexander Novikov to be his favorite musicians. Sergey Nagovitsyn never was in jail and had no criminal record.

On the night of 20 to 21 December 1999, on the way to Kurgan City for a concert, Sergei Nagovitsyn died suddenly of cardiac arrest. On 22 December Sergei was buried in Perm.
