= Moscow Summit (1972) =

Summit between USA and USSR

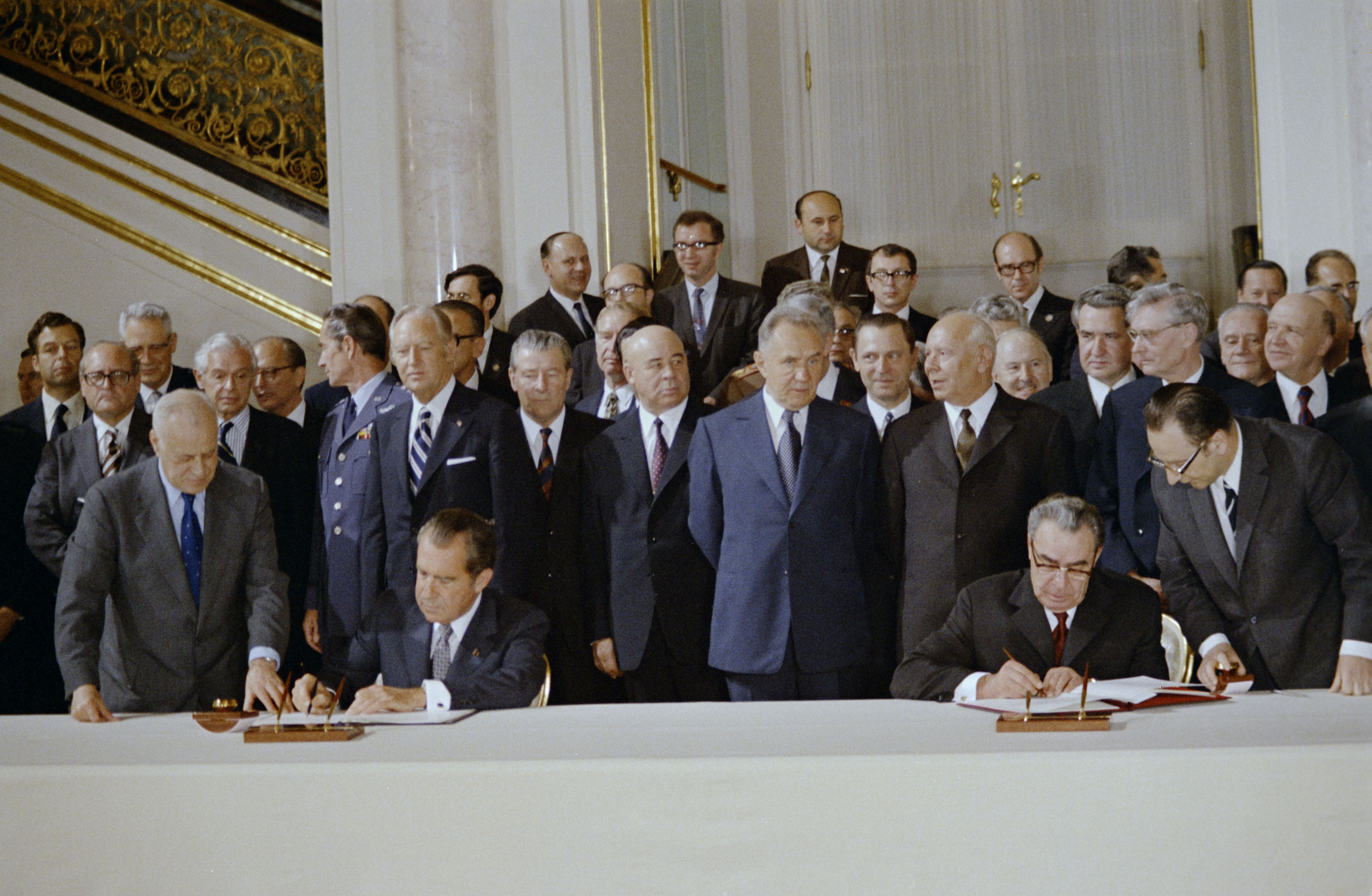
- Nixon and Brezhnev signing the SALT agreement during the summit
- Host country: Soviet Union
- Date: May 22–30, 1972
- Cities: Moscow
- Venues: Kremlin Palace
- Participants: (Soviet Union) Leonid Brezhnev (United States) Richard Nixon
- Follows: Glassboro Summit Conference
- Precedes: Washington Summit (1973)

The Moscow Summit of 1972 was a summit meeting between President Richard M. Nixon of the United States and General Secretary Leonid Brezhnev of the Communist Party of the Soviet Union. It was held May 22–30, 1972. It featured the signing of the Anti-Ballistic Missile (ABM) Treaty, the first Strategic Arms Limitation Treaty (SALT I), and the U.S.–Soviet Incidents at Sea agreement. The summit is considered one of the hallmarks of the détente at the time between the two Cold War antagonists.

== Events ==
The summit followed in the wake of the historic 1972 Nixon visit to China earlier that year, with the Nixon administration soon concluding negotiations for the president to visit the Soviet Union.

On May 22, Nixon became the first U.S. president to visit Moscow (and only the second president, after Franklin D. Roosevelt, to visit the Soviet Union up until that point), as he and Henry Kissinger arrived to begin a summit meeting with Brezhnev. First Lady of the United States Pat Nixon also made the trip. Nixon and Brezhnev engaged in unscheduled talks on that first day. Later that evening, a banquet was held at the Kremlin.

On May 23, Nixon and Chairman of the Presidium of the Supreme Soviet Nikolai Podgorny signed the Agreement on Cooperation in the Field of Environmental Protection.

On May 24, Nixon and Premier of the Soviet Union Alexei Kosygin signed an agreement paving the way for the Apollo-Soyuz Test Project.

On May 26, Nixon and Brezhnev signed two landmark nuclear arms control agreements. The SALT I treaty, product of the Strategic Arms Limitation Talks, froze the number of strategic ballistic missile launchers at existing levels, while the Anti-Ballistic Missile Treaty restricted both sides to only two sites for anti-ballistic missiles, with 100 missiles each.

On May 29, Nixon and Brezhnev concluded the conference, with the signing of a joint declaration of long-range plans to avoid a military confrontation and to eventually disarm.

== See also ==
- List of Soviet Union–United States summits (1943 to 1991)
