= 1977 in the Soviet Union =

- Decades: 1950s; 1960s; 1970s; 1980s; 1990s
- See also: History of the Soviet Union; List of years in the Soviet Union

The following lists events that happened during 1977 in the Union of Soviet Socialist Republics.

== Incumbents ==
- General Secretary of the Communist Party of the Soviet Union:

Leonid Brezhnev

- Chairman of the Presidium of the Supreme Soviet of the Soviet Union:

Nikolai Podgorny (Until 16 June)
Leonid Brezhnev (Starting 16 June)

- Chairman of the Council of Ministers of the Soviet Union:

Alexei Kosygin

== Events ==
- January 8 — Three bombs explode in Moscow within 37 minutes, killing seven. The bombings are attributed to an Armenian separatist group.
- February 7 — The Soviet Union launches Soyuz 24 (Viktor Gorbatko, Yury Glazkov) to dock with the Salyut 5 space station.
- March 4 — An earthquake with a magnitude of 7.5 that occur in neighbouring Romania had destroyed and damaged many buildings in Soviet Moldova.
- March 30 - Aeroflot Flight H-925
- June 16 — Leonid Brezhnev started his second term as Chairman of the Presidium of the Supreme Soviet of the Soviet Union, replacing Nikolai Podgorny as Head of State.
- July 10 — 1977 Aeroflot Tupolev Tu-134 hijacking.
- July 27 — The Politburo orders Boris Yeltsin, First Secretary of Sverdlovsk Oblast, to demolish the Ipatiev House, where Tsar Nicholas II of Russia and his family were shot in 1918.
- August 17 — Arktika, a Soviet nuclear-powered icebreaker, became the first surface ship to reach the North Pole.
- September 20 — The Petrozavodsk phenomenon is observed in the Soviet Union and some northern European countries.
- October 7
  - A new constitution which is known as the Brezhnev Constitution has been adopted, replacing the 1936 Constitution. Constitution Day moved from December 5 to October 7.
  - The Soviet National Anthem's lyrics are returned after a 24-year period, with Joseph Stalin's name omitted.
- October 13 - 1977 Aeroflot Yak-40 accident
- November 7 — The 60th anniversary of the October Revolution is celebrated.
- A influenza pandemic was reported and the pandemic lasted until 1979.

== Births ==
- September 21 — Natalia Gavrilița, 15th Prime Minister of Moldova

== Deaths ==
- March 24 — Maksim Saburov, 9th First Deputy Chairman of the Council of Ministers (b. 1900)
- July 6 — Sergei Kruglov, former Minister of Internal Affairs (b. 1907)
- July 12 — Bobodzhan Gafurov, 10th First Secretary of the Communist Party of the Tajik SSR (b. 1908)
- November 5 — Alexei Stakhanov, miner and Hero of Socialist Labour (b. 1906)
- December 5 — Aleksandr Vasilevsky, 7th Minister of Defence and Marshal of the Soviet Union (b. 1895)
