= Ramazanov =

Ramazanov (Russian: Рамазанов) is a masculine surname of Arabic origin, its feminine counterpart is Ramazanova. It may refer to

- Aghabala Ramazanov (born 1993), Azerbaijani football player
- Alikhan Ramazanov (born 1976), Russian football player
- Elmira Ramazanova (1934–2020), Azerbaijani geologist
- Larisa Ramazanova (born 1971), Russian-Belarusian race walker
- Murad Ramazanov (wrestler) (born 1974), Russian wrestler
- Murad Ramazanov (footballer) (born 1979), Russian football player
- Ramazan Ramazanov (born 1984), Russian kickboxer
- Zaur Ramazanov (born 1976), Azerbaijani football player
- Zemfira (Zemfira Ramazanova), Russian singer
