= 1978 in the Soviet Union =

- Decades: 1950s; 1960s; 1970s; 1980s; 1990s
- See also: History of the Soviet Union; List of years in the Soviet Union

The following lists events that happened during 1978 in the Union of Soviet Socialist Republics.

== Incumbents ==
- General Secretary of the Communist Party of the Soviet Union: Leonid Brezhnev
- Premier of the Soviet Union: Alexei Kosygin
- Chairman of the Russian SFSR: Mikhail Solomentsev

== Events ==
=== January ===
- 24 January – The Kosmos 954 ends its mission

=== April ===
- 14 April – 1978 Georgian demonstrations
- 20 April – The Soviet Air Force shoots down Korean Air Lines Flight 902, a civilian airliner that flew into Soviet airspace.
- 25 April – 18th Komsomol Congress

=== June ===
- 21 June – 1978 Iranian Chinook shootdown: 2 Boeing CH-47 Chinook belonging to the Imperial Iranian Armed Forces strayed into Soviet airspace over the Turkmen Soviet Socialist Republic during a training mission, resulting in the Shootdown of both aircraft by the Soviet Air Forces.

=== September ===
- 28 September – one of the last Forest Brother guerilla movement fighter August Sabbe was discovered and killed in Estonia.

== Births ==
- 25 January – Volodymyr Zelenskyy, President of Ukraine since 2019

== Deaths ==
- January 2 — Boris Chernousov, 10th Chairman of the Council of Ministers of the Russian SFSR (b. 1908)
- January 18 — Ivan Dzerzhinsky, composer (b. 1909)
- January 28 – Nadezhda Fedutenko, red army officer (b. 1915)
- February 17 — Artemiy Artsikhovsky, archaeologist and historian (b. 1902)
- February 19 — Mikhail Zakharov, navy officer (b. 1912)
- February 27 – Vadim Salmanov, composer (b. 1912)
- April 4 — Semyon Kirlian, Russian inventor (b. 1898)
- April 28 — Roman Karmen, film director, war cinematographer, documentary filmmaker, journalist, screenwriter, pedagogue and publicist (b. 1906)
- May 1 — Aram Khachaturian, composer and conductor (b. 1903)
- May 25 — Artur Vader, 8th Chairman of the Presidium of the Supreme Soviet of the Estonian SSR (b. 1920)
- May 26 — Tamara Karsavina, ballerina (b. 1885)
- June 24 — Mstislav Keldysh, mathematician (b. 1911)
- July 17 — Fyodor Kulakov, statesman (b. 1918)
- July 22 — Mikhail Pervukhin, statesman (b. 1904)
- July 31 — Prince Rostislav Alexandrovich of Russia (b. 1902)
- September 5 — Nikodim Rotov, Metropolitan of Leningrad and Novgorod (b. 1929)
- September 27 — Sergei Aslamazyan, composer (b. 1897)
- September 28 – August Sabbe, Estonian anti-communist of the Forest Brother (b. 1909)
- October 18 — Ramón Mercader, Spanish communist and NKVD agent (b. 1913)
- October 21 — Anastas Mikoyan, statesman (b. 1895)
- October 23 — Prince Roman Petrovich of Russia (b. 1896)
- December 18 — Lev Uspensky, writer and philologist (b. 1900)
- December 30 — Mark Naimark, mathematician (b. 1909)

== See also ==
- 1978 in fine arts of the Soviet Union
- List of Soviet films of 1978
