= 1976 in the Soviet Union =

- Decades: 1950s; 1960s; 1970s; 1980s; 1990s
- See also: History of the Soviet Union; List of years in the Soviet Union

The following lists events that happened during 1976 in the Union of Soviet Socialist Republics.

== Incumbents ==
- General Secretary of the Communist Party of the Soviet Union: Leonid Brezhnev
- Premier of the Soviet Union: Alexei Kosygin
- Chairman of the Russian SFSR: Mikhail Solomentsev

== Events ==
=== February ===
- February 24 — 25th Congress of the Communist Party of the Soviet Union

=== June ===
- June 1 — The Philippine government opens relations with the Soviet Union.

== Births ==
- January 10 — Valery Chekalov, Russian mercenary leader (d. 2023)
- February 27 — Sergei Semak, Russian football player and coach
- April 5 — Natascha Ragosina, Russian boxer
- April 12 — Andrei Lipanov, Russian ice skater
- April 21 — Elisabet Reinsalu, Estonian actress
- May 28 — Alexei Nemov, former Russian artistic gymnast
- June 4 — Alexei Navalny, Russian lawyer and activist (d. 2024)
- June 17 — Peter Svidler, Russian chess grandmaster
- June 26 — Alexander Zakharchenko, Ukrainian separatist leader (d. 2018)
- June 30 — Oleg Khorzhan, Moldovan lawyer and politician (d. 2023)
- July 21 — Tatyana Lebedeva, Russian track and field athlete
- July 24 — Yulia Navalnaya, Russian economist and political activist
- July 25 — Timur Mutsurayev, Chechen singer-songwriter
- August 6 — Andero Ermel, Estonian actor
- August 9 — Sergei Tyumentsev, former Russian professional football player
- August 31 — Alikhan Ramazanov, former Russian professional football player
- September 19 — Sergey Tsinkevich, Belarusian professional football referee
- September 26 — Kersti Heinloo, Estonian actress
- September 28 — Fedor Emelianenko, Russian mixed martial arts fighter
- September 29 — Andriy Shevchenko, Ukrainian footballer
- October 5 — Ramzan Kadyrov, 3rd Head of the Chechen Republic
- October 25 — Anton Sikharulidze, Russian figure skater
- November 5 — Oleh Shelayev, Ukrainian footballer
- November 23 — Chiril Gaburici, 10th Prime Minister of Moldova
- December 26 — Dmitri Tertyshny, Russian professional ice hockey denfenceman (d. 1999)

== Deaths ==
- January 11 — Aleksey Sorokin, member of Soviet cosmonaut program (b. 1931)
- February 27 — Vladimir Lemeshev, football player and coach (b. 1911)
- March 5 — Otto Tief, Estonian politician, military commander and lawyer (b. 1889)
- March 25 — Nikolai Kulakov, navy officer (b. 1908)
- April 26 — Andrei Grechko, 4th Minister of Defence (b. 1903)
- May 11 — Serafima Birman, actress, theatre director and writer (b. 1890)
- June 8 — Mikhail Katukov, armor commander (b. 1900)
- August 6 — Maria Klenova, marine geologist (b. 1898)
- August 30 — Pyotr Koshevoy, military commander (b. 1904)
- November 20 — Trofim Lysenko, agronomist and scientist (b. 1898)
- November 30 — Ivan Yakubovsky, 3rd Commander-in-chief of the Warsaw Pact (b. 1912)
- December 3 — Alexander Novikov, chief marshal of aviation for the Soviet Air Force (b. 1900)

== See also ==
- 1976 in fine arts of the Soviet Union
- List of Soviet films of 1976
