= Tyumentsev =

Tyumentsev is a surname. Notable people with the surname include:

- Andrey Tyumentsev (born 1963), Soviet handball player
- Daniil Tyumentsev (born 1997), Russian footballer
- Sergei Tyumentsev (born 1976), Russian footballer
- Vladimir Tyumentsev (born 1982), Russian freestyle skier
