= Leida Peips =

Estonian milker (born 1937)

- Born: February 1, 1937 (age 89); Republic of Estonia
- Education: Avanduse Agricultural School
- Occupations: milker and economic, state and political figure
- Awards: Order of the Red Banner of Labour (1973); Order of Lenin (1975); Hero of Socialist Labour (1975); Order of Friendship of Peoples (1981)

Leida Peips (born 1 February 1937) is an Estonian former milker who became an economic, state and political figure. She received Soviet Union awards including the Order of the Red Banner of Labour, the Order of Lenin and the Order of Friendship of Peoples. As chief milker, she represented Estonia in the Supreme Soviet of the Soviet Union in Moscow during Leonid Brezhnev's leadership.

== Biography ==
Peips was born on 1 February 1937 in the Republic of Estonia. She was educated at the Avanduse Agricultural School, taking a specialised dairy course.

Peips worked as a milker at the collective Viljandi Model State Farm from 1954, where she developed an ability to milk an above average number of kilograms of milk from each cow. Her abilities were due to devising techniques from time and motion studies and breeding cows that were suited to her milking methods.

In recognition of her work, Peips was awarded the Order of the Red Banner of Labour in 1973. Peips was also awarded a Certificate of Honour and cheque for a Moskvich car from the Soviet Union (USSR) Exhibition of Economic Achievement, where she also set herself a goal of milking 6,000 kilograms per cow. She completed her five-year work plan in four years, became famous across the USSR and was promoted as a hero.

In 1974, Peips milked 5,200 kilograms of milk from each cow, whereas the Estonian average was less than 4,000 kilograms and the Russian average was less than 3,000 kilograms. In February 1975, Peips was awarded the hammer and sickle gold Hero of Socialist Labour medal and was appointed to the civilian Order of Lenin.

In 1981, she was awarded the Order of Friendship of Peoples. The following year, Mahmusor Kurbanova, a famous milker of the Govsany State Farm in Apsheron, Azerbaijan, visited her at the Viljandi Model State Farm.

Peips applied to become a member of the Communist Party of the Soviet Union and wrote that her "cherished dream had come true" when she was accepted her as a candidate member. As chief milker, she was selected to represent Estonia's interests as a member of the ninth legislature of the Supreme Soviet of the Soviet Union in Moscow, during Leonid Brezhnev's leadership of the USSR. Political jokes were made about Peips and her reception in Moscow, such as "people say that after arriving from Moscow, Leida Peips can no longer milk cows as her hands do not move up and down any more, but only apart and together again!"

As of 2022, Pieps lives in lives in Päri, Estonia.

== Awards ==
- Order of the Red Banner of Labour (1973)
- Order of Lenin (1975)
- Hero of Socialist Labour (1975)
- Order of Friendship of Peoples (1981)
