= List of members of the Supreme Soviet of the Estonian Soviet Socialist Republic, 1975–1980 =

This is a list of members of the ninth legislature of the Supreme Soviet of the Estonian Soviet Socialist Republic which was the Estonian Soviet Socialist Republic's legislative chamber between 1940 and 1941, and between 1944 and 1992. The session ran from 15. June 1975 and 24 February 1980, and followed the 1975 Estonian Supreme Soviet election in which only Bloc of Communists and Non-Party Candidates was the only party able to contest the elections.

== List of members ==
Source: Jaan Toomla, Valitud ja Valitsenud: Eesti parlamentaarsete ja muude esinduskogude ning valitsuste isikkoosseis aastail 1917–1999 (National Library of Estonia, 1999), pp. 105–108.

| Name | Party | Notes |
|---|---|---|
| Zinaida Agafonova | NLKP | |
| Albert Aleksandrov | | |
| Mihhail Aleksejev | NLKP | Died in office on 06.06.1979 |
| Asta Aleste | ÜLKNÜ | |
| Tõnu Allik | -, NLKP | |
| Leonid Ananitš | NLKP | |
| Valter Ani | NLKP | |
| Rein Avaste | ÜLKNÜ | |
| Aili Avistu | -, NLKP | |
| Liivi Bakler | NLKP | |
| Vladimir Beekman | NLKP | |
| Roman Butel | NLKP | |
| Nikolai Dudkin | NLKP | |
| Enn Ehala | NLKP | |
| Ferdinand Eisen | NLKP | |
| Valter Eks | NLKP | |
| Urve Elmi | NLKP | |
| Erich Erilt | NLKP | |
| Jan Ganzen | NLKP | |
| Kerti Gordon (Üksine) | ÜLKNÜ | |
| Mihhail Gorlatš | NLKP | Died in office on 11.04.1978 |
| Jevgenia Goršanova | NLKP | |
| Arnold Green | NLKP | |
| Elsa Gretškina | NLKP | |
| Niina Hilitinskaja | | |
| Valli Hoomatalu | -, NLKP | |
| Roland Ilp | NLKP | |
| Harald Ilves | NLKP | |
| Vladimir vanov | ÜLKNÜ | |
| Zinaida Ivanova | | |
| Edgar Jaksen | NLKP | |
| Eevi Jamnes | | |
| Uno Jürisoo | NLKP | |
| Juhan-Kaspar Jürna | NLKP | |
| Anu Kaal | | |
| Viktor Kalda | | |
| Arvi Kallakmaa | NLKP | |
| Ivar Kallion | NLKP | |
| Este Kante | NLKP | |
| Jevgeni Karhu | ÜLKNÜ | |
| Armilda Kass | NLKP | |
| Peeter Kašev | NLKP | |
| Asta Kaup | | |
| Malle Kebbinau | | |
| Jüri Kihno | ÜLKNÜ | |
| Valentina Kiiver | | |
| Ehe Kiivramees | | |
| Karl Kimmel | NLKP | |
| Lea Kingissepp | | |
| Rosalie Kirjanen | NLKP | |
| Palmi Kivimäe | NLKP | |
| Valter Klauson (Klaussen) | NLKP | |
| Mall Koitmäe | | |
| Leida Kokk | NLKP | |
| Valentin Kolos(s)ov | | |
| Vassili Konstantinov | NLKP | |
| Valjo Koort | NLKP | |
| Boriss Korolev | NLKP | Died in office on 21.01.1978 |
| Aleksei Kotov | NLKP | |
| Anatoli Kristmann | NLKP | |
| Boriss Kuznetsov | NLKP | Died in office on 16.09.1979 |
| Johannes Käbin | NLKP | |
| Mart Kalle | NLKP | |
| Vladimir Käo | NLKP | |
| Marje Kärg | | |
| Fiffi Käärik | -, NLKP | |
| Arno Kööma | NLKP | |
| Mare Küüsvek (Reinpere) | ÜLKNÜ | |
| Lilia Laansalu | ÜLKNÜ | |
| Konstantin Lebedev | NLKP | |
| Tiit Lemming | ÜLKNÜ | |
| Galina Levtšenko | NLKP | |
| Mare Liiv | ÜLKNÜ | |
| Aleksander Lind | NLKP | |
| Nikolai Ljoh(h)in | NLKP | |
| Johannes Lott | NLKP | |
| Kuulo Lume | | |
| Pjotr Lušev | NLKP | |
| Leida Maasikas | | |
| Ago Madik | NLKP | |
| Paul Maibaum | -, NLKP | |
| Hugo Maide | NLKP | |
| Valdo Mais | | |
| Ülle Malm | ÜLKNÜ | |
| Rudolf Mannov | NLKP | |
| Eha Matto | | |
| Edda-Marta Maurer | NLKP | Died in office on 10.05.1979 |
| Boriss Medvedjev | -, NLKP | |
| Otto Merimaa | NLKP | |
| Aleksander Mette | NLKP | |
| Lidia Murtazina | NLKP | |
| Harald Männik | NLKP | |
| Luule MLinter | | |
| Vladimir Nagibin | NLKP | |
| Andres Nahk | NLKP | |
| Else Narusk | | |
| Valentina Narusson | NLKP | |
| Sergei Naumov | NLKP | |
| Georg Nellis | NLKP | |
| Ülo Niisuke | NLKP | |
| Jevgeni Nikandrov | NLKP | |
| Albert Norak | NLKP | |
| Voldemar Norden | NLKP | |
| Kalev Nõmm | NLKP | |
| Ülo Nõmm | NLKP | |
| Endel Nõmmik | | |
| Kati Nõu | NLKP | |
| Toivo Näppi | | |
| Arvi Ojala | | |
| Aarne Ojasaar | -, NLKP | |
| Ellen Orav | -, NLKP | |
| Kalle Orav | ÜLKNÜ | |
| Heli Pääl | NLKP | |
| Peeter Palu | NLKP | Elected on 24.09.1978 |
| August Pedajas | NLKP | |
| Leida Peips | NLKP | |
| Raimund Penu | NLKP | |
| Albert Pipper | | |
| Juta Ploom (Elmik) | | |
| August Pork | NLKP | |
| Gennadi Pronkin | NLKP | |
| Leonhard Puksa | NLKP | |
| Aksel Põldroo | NLKP | |
| Heljo Päärendson | ÜLKNÜ | |
| Elve Raadik | -, NLKP | |
| Helve Raik | NLKP | |
| Nelli Reesaar (Burdina) | ÜLKNÜ | |
| Välde Roosmaa | NLKP | |
| Maret Roots | | |
| Anatoli Roštšin | -, NLKP | |
| Jüri Räim | NLKP | |
| Jaan Rääts | NLKP | |
| Arnold Rüütel | NLKP | |
| Liivi Saar | NLKP | |
| Helmi Saaremets | | |
| August Saaremägi | NLKP | |
| Endel Saia | NLKP | |
| Rein Sallo | NLKP | |
| Jaan Sarapuu | NLKP | |
| Bruno Saul | NLKP | |
| Anatoli Savkov | | |
| Adolf Sepa | NLKP | |
| Leida Sipria | NLKP | |
| Aleksei Smirnov | NLKP | |
| Vladimir Soldogin | NLKP | |
| Sergei Stõtšinski | NLKP | |
| Jüri Suurhans | NLKP | |
| Luule Süve | | |
| Lidia Šapkina | NLKP | |
| Aleksei Šindorikov | | |
| Zoja Šiškina | NLKP | |
| Lev Šišov | NLKP | |
| Adolf Škiperov | | |
| Leonid Zamahhin | NLKP | |
| Leonid Zarubin | NLKP | |
| Anu Taal | ÜLKNÜ | |
| Arvo Taal | NLKP | |
| Valve Tali | NLKP | |
| Mati Tamberg | ÜLKNÜ | |
| Ülo Tambet | NLKP | |
| Eva Tamm | ÜLKNÜ | |
| Helge Tammel | -, NLKP | |
| Aino Tammeorg | NLKP | |
| Aino Tammet | ÜLKNÜ | |
| Viktor Tenosaar | NLKP | |
| Jaan Tepandi | NLKP | |
| Vilja Tikk | NLKP | |
| Uno Tinits | NLKP | |
| Kuno Todeson | NLKP | |
| Arnold Toome | NLKP | |
| Indrek Toome | NLKP | |
| Erhard Toots | NLKP | Elected on 18.06.1978 |
| Anatoli Tregubov | NLKP | Elected on 16.04.1978 |
| Ado Truupõld | NLKP | |
| Genrich Turonok | NLKP | |
| Gustav Tõnspoeg | NLKP | |
| Kaalu Tõnts | NLKP | |
| Edgar Tõnurist | NLKP | |
| Valter Udam | NLKP | |
| Artur-Bernhard Upsi | NLKP | |
| Heino Urm | NLKP | |
| Fjodor Ušanjov | NLKP | |
| Olaf-Knut Utt | NLKP | |
| Aime Vader (Rong) | ÜLKNÜ | |
| Artur Vader | NLKP | Died in office on 25.05.1978 |
| Viktor Vaht | NLKP | |
| Aili Vahtra | ÜLKNÜ | |
| Karl Vaino | NLKP | |
| Taimi Valg | NLKP | |
| Hendrik Valk | NLKP | |
| Meta Vannas (Jangolenko) | NLKP | |
| Pjotr Vassikov | NLKP | |
| Ellen Veepere | | |
| Uno Veeperv | NLKP | |
| Sale Veski | NLKP | |
| Lembit Vihvelin | NLKP | |
| Vello Vilimaa | NLKP | |
| Eevi Vister | ÜLKNÜ | |
| Juri Vladõtšin | NLKP | |
| Daniil Vlassov | NLKP | |
| Galina Vohmjanina | NLKP | |
| Valdo Väinaste | | |
| Vaino Väljas | NLKP | |
