= Aeroflot Flight 75 =

1977 aviation incident in the Soviet Union

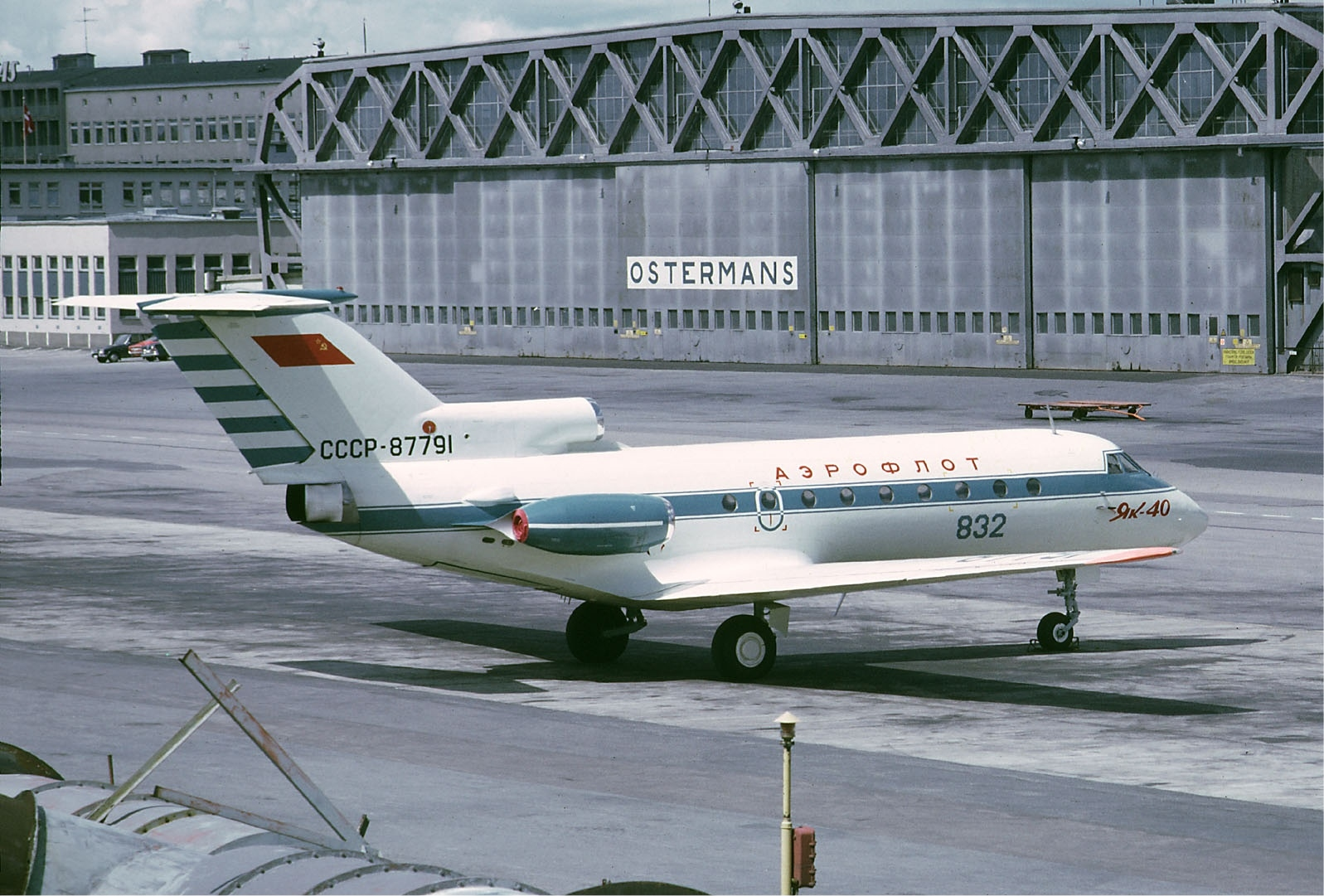
- A similar Aeroflot Yakovlev Yak-40

Accident
- Date: 13 October 1977
- Summary: Cargo hatch opened mid-flight
- Site: Near Rostov-on-Don Airport, Rostov-on-Don, RSFSR

Aircraft
- Aircraft type: Yakovlev Yak-40
- Operator: Aeroflot
- Registration: CCCP-87948
- Flight origin: Rostov-on-Don Airport, Rostov-on-Don, RSFSR
- Destination: Mykolaiv Airport, Mykolaiv, UkSSR
- Occupants: 22
- Passengers: 18
- Crew: 4
- Fatalities: 2
- Injuries: 0
- Survivors: 20

On October 13, 1977, a Yakovlev Yak-40 operating as Aeroflot Flight 75 had its cargo hatch opened mid-flight, resulting in 2 people being killed.

== Aircraft ==
The Yakovlev Yak-40 (registration CCCP-87948) was manufactured in 1976 and was equipped with three Ivchenko AI-25 turbofan engines. The airliner was powered by three Ivchenko AI-25 turbofan engines. At the time of the accident, it had accumulated 2,486 flight hours and 1,704 cycles

== Accident ==
The aircraft took off from Rostov-on-Don Airport en route to Mykolaiv Airport. During the cruise phase, the cargo hatch opened unexpectedly, resulting in the ejection of items from seats 2A, 2B, 3A, and 3B. In this incident, a mother and her child were ejected from the aircraft and did not survive, while a male passenger managed to hold on to his seat with the assistance of other passengers. “The flight then returned to Rostov-on-Don Airport for an emergency landing. The man was compensated 100 rubles for his clothes.

== Aftermath ==
=== Investigation ===
An investigation commission concluded that the incident occurred because the flight engineer failed to secure the cargo hatch prior to the commencement of the passenger flight

=== Burial ===
The deceased—a mother and her child—were interred in a public cemetery.

=== Aircraft ===
On 31 October 1979, the same aircraft was involved in another incident when an engine failure necessitated an emergency landing.
