= 1975 Estonian Supreme Soviet election =

1975 elections in Estonian SSR

Elections to the Supreme Soviet of the Estonian SSR were held on 15 June 1975. The Bloc of Communists and Non-Party Candidates was the only party able to contest the elections, and won all 200 seats.

== Results ==
Party	Votes	%	Seats
Bloc of Communists and Non-Party Candidates		99.89	200
Against		0.11	–
Total			200
Registered voters/turnout		99.98	
Source: Liivik

== See also ==
- List of members of the Supreme Soviet of the Estonian Soviet Socialist Republic, 1975–1980
