= Agreement Concerning Cooperation in the Exploration and Use of Outer Space for Peaceful Purposes =

The Agreement Concerning Cooperation in the Exploration and Use of Outer Space for Peaceful Purposes was an agreement between the United States (US) and the Union of Soviet Socialist Republics (USSR) which established a legal framework for the Apollo–Soyuz Test Project (ASTP) and refined the means and methods for sharing data between these two parties. It was written in the days leading up to May 24, 1972. Having been agreed upon months earlier, it was signed by US President Richard Nixon and USSR. Premier A. N. Kosygin in Moscow during a three-day state visit. This agreement was of particular significance as it furthered efforts towards cooperation in space between the US and the USSR. during the Cold War.

== Key points ==
The Agreement enumerates areas in which the US and the USSR. would cooperate, notably exploration, space meteorology, environmental sciences, celestial bodies, and space medicine. It describes the means to accomplish these goals, listing among other things, "delegations [and] meetings of scientists and specialists of both countries."

It also broadly outlines the goals and time frame of the ASTP, stating that "[t]he parties have agreed to carry out projects for developing compatible rendezvous and docking systems [...] in order to enhance the safety of manned flight in space and to provide the opportunity for conducting joint scientific experiments." The agreement gives a tentative date and method for the implementation of the mission, describing "the docking of a United States Apollo-type spacecraft and a Soviet Soyuz-type spacecraft with visits of astronauts in each other's spacecraft."

Though the Soviets wanted to include clauses concerning communication satellites, the State Department could not agree to this as the United States' government did not control this industry.

== Background and history ==
Though the Americans shrouded preliminary efforts to draft this agreement in secrecy to the point that it was being treated as "semi-clandestine," the Soviets had no such reservations; indeed, NASA officials found news of one of their upcoming meetings on the front page of the New York Times.

In The Partnership: A History of the Apollo-Soyuz Test Project by Edward C. Ezell and his wife, Linda Newman Ezell, the agreement's inception is narrated: the USSR only shared its drafts "a week before the Summit", leading to frantic scrambling on the part of the US State Department to finish theirs, working "until the middle of the night."

US President Nixon and USSR. Premier Kosygin signed the Agreement at 6:00 p.m. Moscow time on July 24, 1972.
