= Lev Uspensky =

Russian writer and philologist (1900–1978)

Lev Vasilyevich Uspensky (Russian: Лев Васильевич Успенский, 8 February 1900 – 18 December 1978) was a Russian writer and philologist, known for his popular science books in linguistics.

== Works ==
=== Prose ===
- «Запах лимона» (1928, with L.L. Rubinov, as Lev Rubus)
- «Пулковский меридиан» (1939, with G.N. Karayev)
- «60-я параллель» (1955, with G.N. Karayev)

=== Science fiction ===
- Плавание «Зэты». (1946)
- Шальмугровое яблоко. (1972)
- Эн-два-о плюс икс дважды. (1971)

=== Popular science ===
- «Слово о словах» (1954), popular linguistics
- «Ты и твоё имя» (1960), popular linguistics
- «Имя дома твоего» (1967), popular linguistics
- «Загадки топонимики» (1969), popular linguistics
- «По закону буквы», popular linguistics, history of Russian alphabet
- Почему не иначе? Этимологический словарь школьника
- За языком до Киева, popular linguistics
- По дорогам и тропам языка, popular linguistics
- За семью печатями, popular archaeology
- Записки старого петербуржца, popular history of St.Petersburg
- Мифы Древней Греции, popular Greek mythology
- Золотое руно; Двенадцать подвигов Геракла, popular Greek mythology
