= Aleksey Sorokin (officer) =

Soviet cosmonaut

Aleksey Vasilyevich Sorokin (Russian: Алексей Васильевич Сорокин; 30 March 1931 – 11 January 1976) was a member of the Soviet cosmonaut program.
