= 1977 Aeroflot Tupolev Tu-134 hijacking =

Hijacking of a Soviet airliner in 1977

Aeroflot Flight 8710
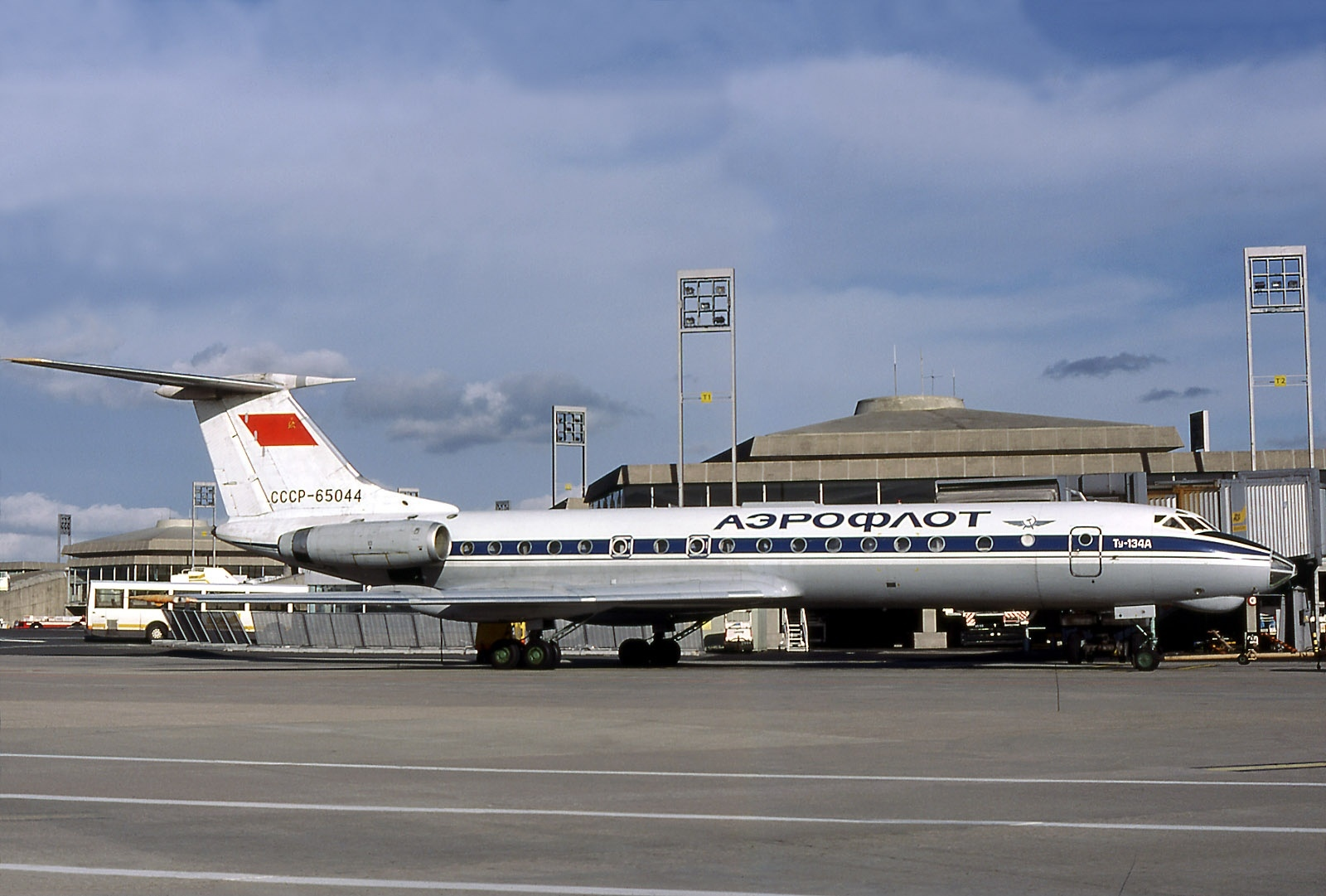
- A Tu-134 similar to the aircraft involved

Hijacking
- Date: 10 July 1977
- Summary: Hijacking
- Site: Helsinki, Finland

Aircraft
- Aircraft type: Tupolev Tu-134
- Operator: Aeroflot
- Registration: CCCP-65639
- Flight origin: Petrozavodsk Airport
- Stopover: Helsinki Airport
- Destination: Pulkovo Airport
- Occupants: 75
- Fatalities: 0
- Survivors: 75

On 10 July 1977, two Soviet hijackers took over an Aeroflot Tupolev Tu-134 flight in the hope of diverting it to Stockholm, Sweden. Lacking the fuel to do this, the aircraft landed at Helsinki Airport, Finland, where the hijackers kept hostages to demand that the Finnish authorities refuel the aircraft and provide it with a new crew. However, the hostages escaped after the hijackers fell asleep. Without bargaining power, the hijackers surrendered and were extradited back to the Soviet Union, where they were sentenced to lengthy prison terms.

== Incident ==
The Tu-134 departed Petrozavodsk Airport on 10 July 1977 with a passenger complement of approximately seventy and an intended destination of Leningrad-Pulkovo Airport. (Note: Reports in the American press put the total at 70 (The New York Times) or 72 (The Washington Post).) Partway through the flight, the aircraft was commandeered by 19-year-old Alexandr Zagirnjak and 22-year-old Gennadi Sheludko. The two had smuggled guns and what appeared to be a grenade on board, though it was later revealed to be a non-explosive training grenade, and demanded that the crew fly the plane to Stockholm.

As the aircraft did not have the fuel to travel over the Baltic Sea to the Swedish capital, the crew were forced to divert to Helsinki Airport, Finland. Upon landing, the hijackers released all of the crew and a significant number of its passengers. The remainder, which reportedly included at least seven children, were held back as hostages. Zagirnjak and Sheludko hoped to use them as leverage to get Finnish authorities to refuel the aircraft, replace the Soviet crew, and allow them to fly to their original destination. This plan was foiled when Zagirnjak and Sheludko fell asleep, which allowed the remaining hostages to escape. (Note: The number of escapees varies. The Associated Press reported at the time that three had escaped, while YLE—Finland's national public broadcaster—reported in a 2009 retrospective that there were four.)

Lacking bargaining power, the hijackers surrendered at 5 a.m. on 12 July. The Finnish government returned them to the Soviet Union three days later, complying with a unique anti-hijacking treaty they had signed with the Soviets in 1974. Sheludko, who had a previous criminal record for theft, was sentenced to fifteen years; Zagirnjak received eight.

The incident came as part of a recent increase in airliner hijacking. The Washington Post reported that it was the third such crime in a week, with the others occurring in the Middle East and South America, and that the last successful hijacking of a Soviet aircraft had been only two months earlier.

== Footnotes ==
External image
- Associated Press photo of the hijacked airplane (subscription required)
