= 1975 in the Soviet Union =

- Decades: 1950s; 1960s; 1970s; 1980s; 1990s
- See also: History of the Soviet Union; List of years in the Soviet Union

The following lists events that happened during 1975 in the Union of Soviet Socialist Republics.

== Incumbents ==
- General Secretary of the Communist Party of the Soviet Union:

Leonid Brezhnev

- Chairman of the Presidium of the Supreme Soviet of the Soviet Union:

Nikolai Podgorny

- Chairman of the Council of Ministers of the Soviet Union:

Alexei Kosygin

== Events ==
- April 5 — The Soviet crewed space mission (Soyuz 18a) ends in failure during its ascent into orbit when a critical malfunction occurs in the second and third stages of the booster rocket during staging at an altitude of 192 km, resulting in the cosmonauts and their Soyuz spacecraft having to be ripped free from the vehicle. Both cosmonauts (Vasily Lazarev and Oleg Makarov) survive.
- April 23 — The Soviet Union announced that they will back Israel if they were to withdraw from occupied Arab territories.
- May 9 — The 1975 Moscow Victory Day Parade is held to commemorate the 30th anniversary of the defeat of Nazi Germany.
- June 15 — The 1975 Estonian Supreme Soviet election is held in the Estonian SSR.
- July 17 — Apollo–Soyuz Test Project: A crewed American Apollo spacecraft and the crewed Soviet Soyuz spacecraft for the Soyuz 19 mission dock in orbit, marking the first such link-up between spacecraft from the 2 nations.
- August 1 — The Helsinki Accords is signed in an attempt to improve the détente between the Eastern Bloc and the West.
- August 6 — The Presidium of the Supreme Soviet unanimously approved the Helsinki Accords, and a resolution praying "that all countries represented at the conference will live up to the agreements reached. As to the Soviet Union, it will act precisely in this way."

== Births ==
- February 14 — Nika Gilauri, 8th Prime Minister of Georgia
- February 18 — Igor Dodon, 5th President of Moldova
- March 19 — Giorgi Gakharia, 14th Prime Minister of Georgia
- June 1 — Nikol Pashinyan, 16th Prime Minister of Armenia
- July 2 — Alexander Turchin, 11th Prime Minister of Belarus
- July 12 — Kristen Michal, 20th Prime Minister of Estonia
- August 3 — Evika Silina, 24th Prime Minister of Latvia
- October 15 — Denys Shmyhal, 18th Prime Minister of Ukraine

== Deaths ==
- February 24 — Nikolai Bulganin, 6th Premier of the Soviet Union (b. 1895)
- March 7 — Mikhail Bakhtin, philosopher and literary critic (b. 1895)
- July 17 — Konstantine Gamsakhurdia, writer (b. 1893)
- August 9 — Dmitri Shostakovich, composer and pianist (b. 1906)
- August 16 — Vladimir Kuts, long-distance runner (b. 1927)
- September 15 — Pavel Sukhoi, aerospace engineer and aircraft designer (b. 1895)
- October 13 — Balysh Ovezov, 12th First Secretary of the Communist Party of the Turkmen SSR (b. 1915)
- November 19 — Viktor Avdyushko, actor (b. 1925)
- December 28 — Aleksey Kirichenko, 11th First Secretary of the Communist Party of Ukraine (b. 1908)
- December 30 — Elene Akhvlediani, painter, graphic artist and theater decorator (b. 1898)
