= Apollo–Soyuz =

First international crewed spaceflight mission

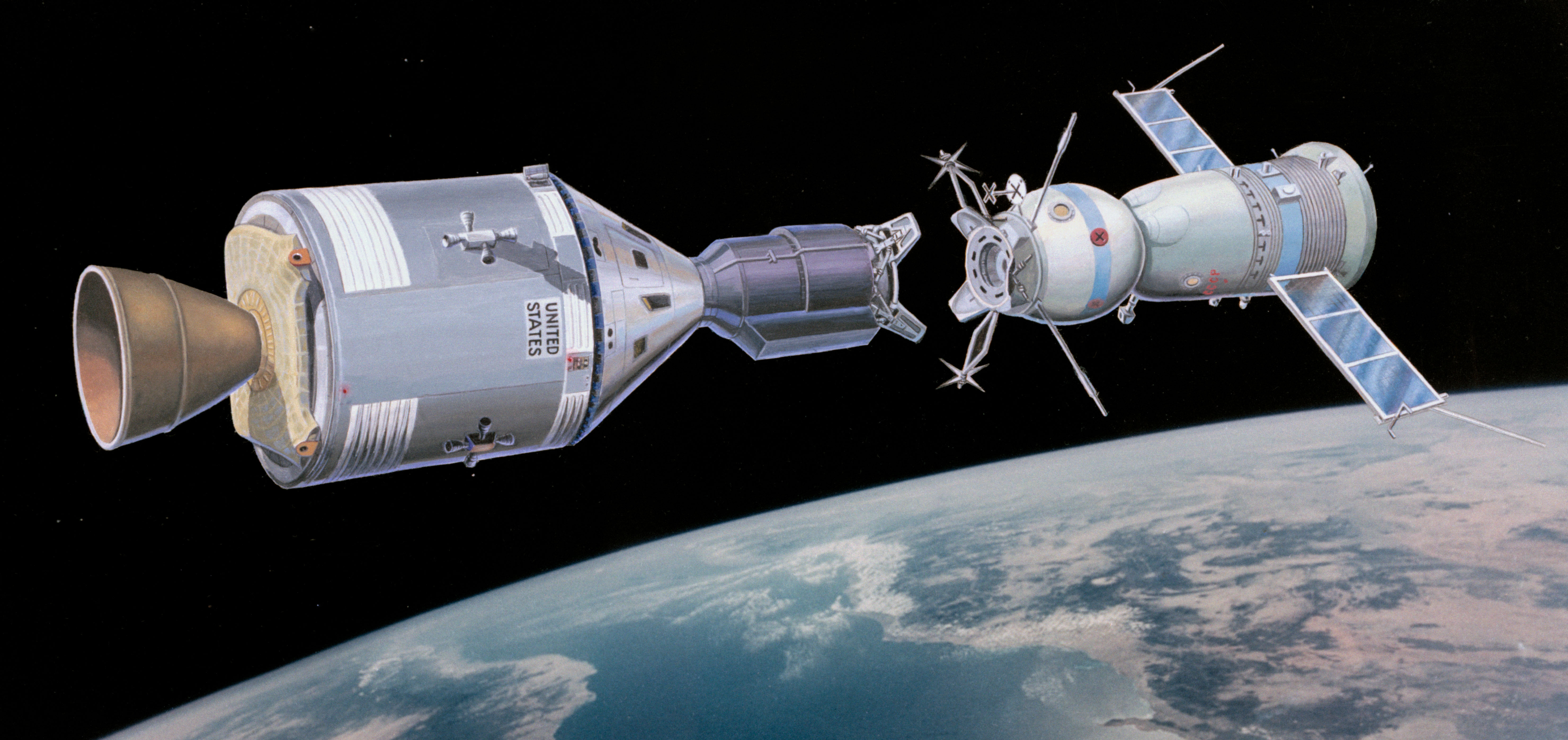
- A 1973 artist's conception of the docking of the two spacecraft
- Mission type: Cooperative/scientific
- Operator: NASA; Soviet space program
- COSPAR ID: Apollo: 1975-066A; Soyuz: 1975-065A
- SATCAT no.: Apollo: 8032; Soyuz: 8030
- Mission duration: Apollo: 9 days, 1 hour, 28 minutes; Soyuz: 5 days, 22 hours, 30 minutes
- Orbits completed: Apollo: 148; Soyuz: 96

Spacecraft properties
- Spacecraft: Apollo CSM-111; Docking Module; Soyuz 7K-TM No. 75
- Manufacturer: Apollo: North American Rockwell; Soyuz: NPO Energia
- Launch mass: Apollo: 14,768 kg (32,558 lb); Docking Module: 2,012 kg (4,436 lb); Soyuz: 6,790 kg (14,970 lb)

Crew
- Crew size: Apollo: 3; Soyuz: 2
- Members: Apollo: Thomas P. Stafford; Vance D. Brand; Deke Slayton; Soyuz: Alexei Leonov; Valery Kubasov

Start of mission
- Launch date: Apollo: 15 July 1975, 19:50:00 UTC; Soyuz: 15 July 1975, 12:20:00 UTC
- Rocket: Apollo: Saturn IB (SA-210); Soyuz: Soyuz-U
- Launch site: Apollo: Kennedy, LC‑39B; Soyuz: Baikonur, Site 1/5

End of mission
- Recovered by: Apollo: USS New Orleans; Soyuz: Soviet Armed Forces
- Landing date: Apollo: 24 July 1975, 21:18:24 UTC; Soyuz: 21 July 1975, 10:50:51 UTC
- Landing site: Apollo: Pacific Ocean, near Hawaii (22°0′36″N 163°0′45″W); Soyuz: Kazakh Steppe (50°47′N 67°7′E)

Orbital parameters
- Reference system: Geocentric orbit
- Regime: Low Earth orbit
- Perigee altitude: 217 km (134.8 mi; 117.2 nmi)
- Apogee altitude: 231 km (143.5 mi; 124.7 nmi)
- Inclination: 51.8°
- Period: 88.91 minutes

Docking
- Docking date: 17 July 1975, 16:09:09 UTC
- Undocking date: 19 July 1975, 12:12:00 UTC
- Time docked: 44 hours, 2 minutes and 51 seconds
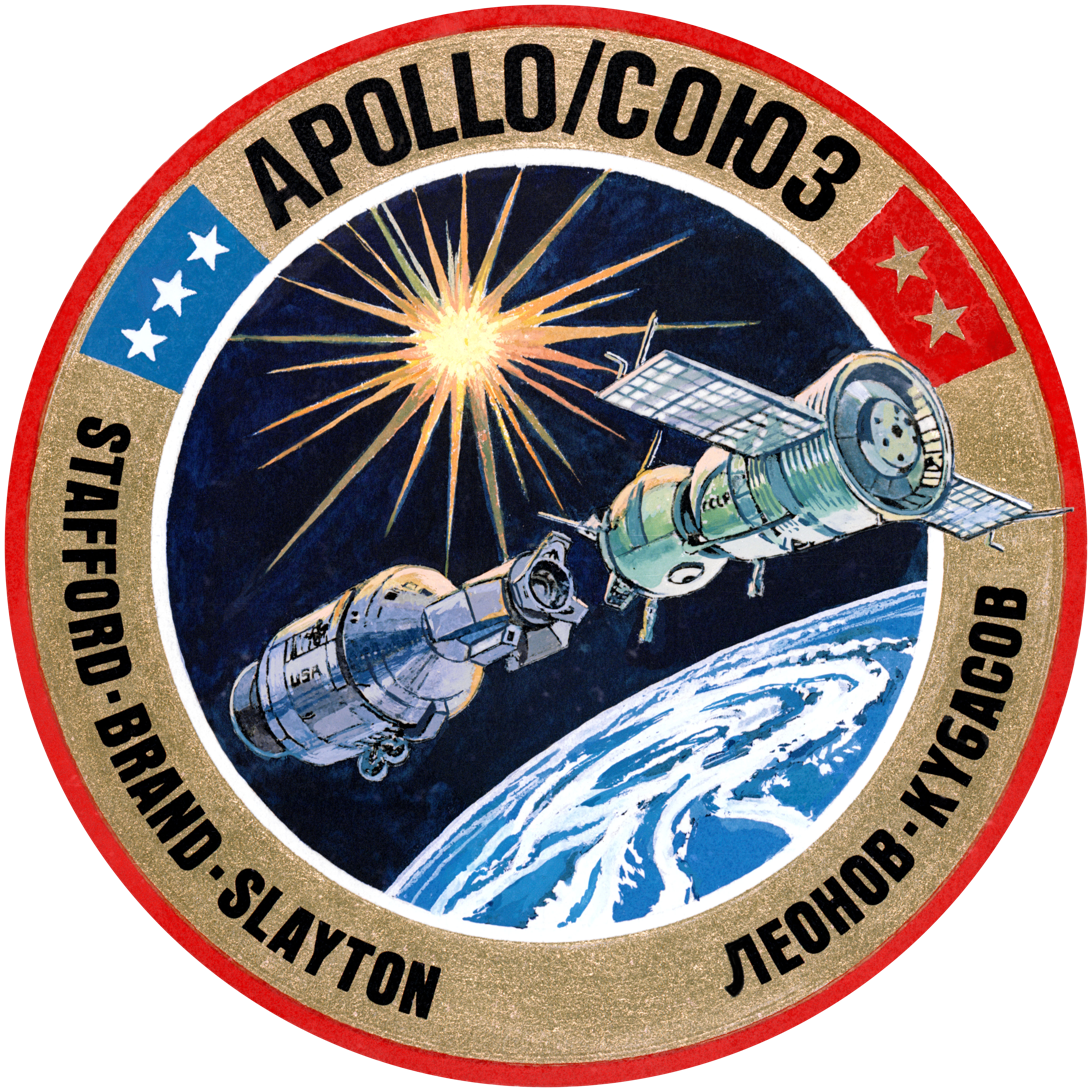
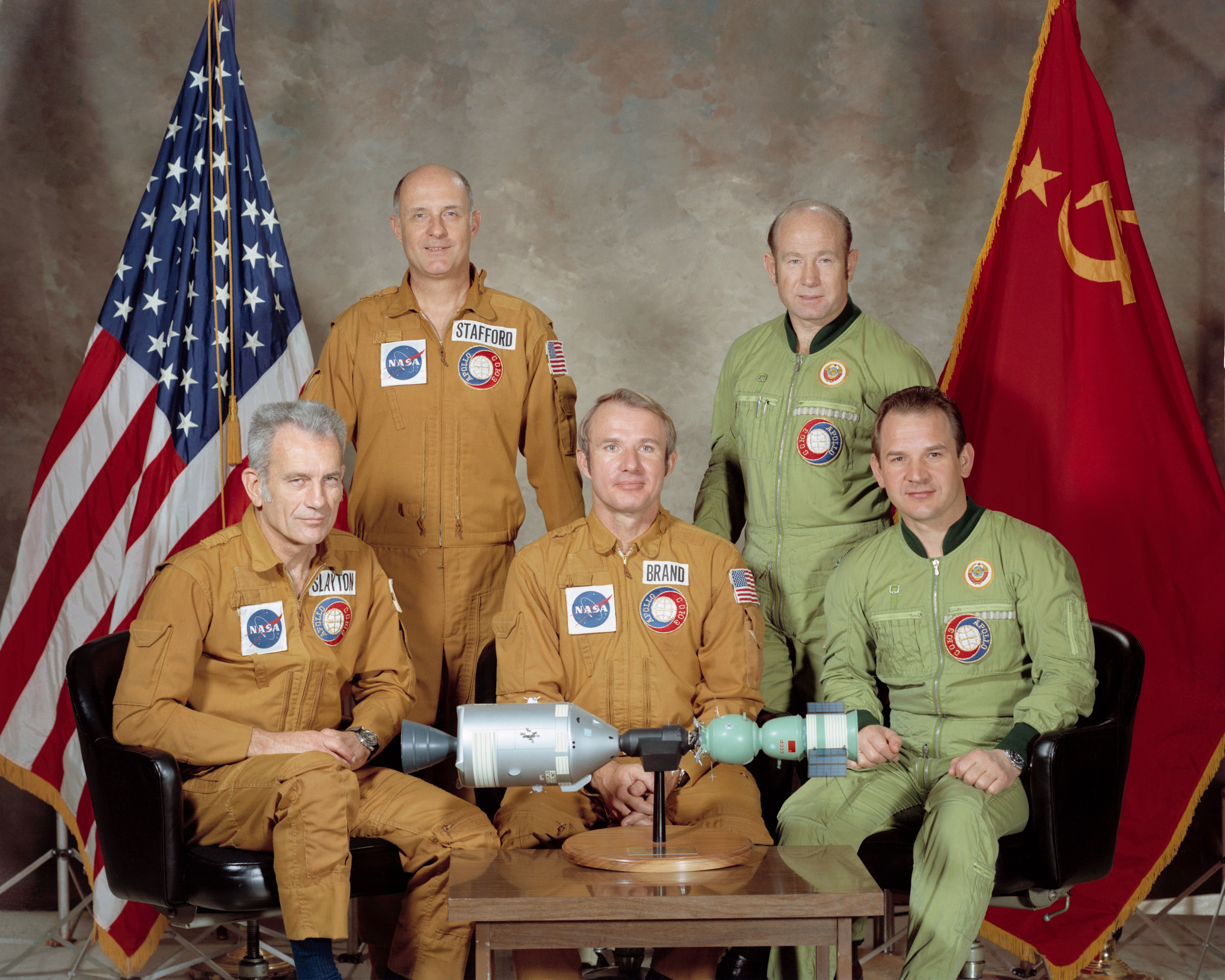
- Official emblems of Apollo–Soyuz used by NASA and the АН СССР respectively Back Row: Stafford, Leonov; Front Row: Slayton, Brand, Kubasov Apollo program Soyuz programme

Apollo–Soyuz was the first crewed international space mission, conducted jointly by the United States and the Soviet Union in July 1975. Millions watched on television as an American Apollo spacecraft docked with a Soviet Soyuz capsule. The mission and its symbolic "handshake in space" became an emblem of détente during the Cold War.

The Americans referred to the flight as the Apollo–Soyuz Test Project (ASTP), while the Soviets called it Experimental flight "Soyuz"–"Apollo" (Russian: Экспериментальный полёт «Союз»–«Аполлон», romanized: Eksperimentalniy polyot "Soyuz"–"Apollon") and designated the spacecraft Soyuz 19. The unnumbered Apollo vehicle was a leftover from the canceled Apollo missions program and was the final Apollo module to fly.

The crew consisted of American astronauts Thomas P. Stafford, Vance D. Brand, and Deke Slayton, and Soviet cosmonauts Alexei Leonov and Valery Kubasov. They carried out joint and independent experiments, including an arranged solar eclipse created by the Apollo spacecraft to allow Soyuz instruments to photograph the solar corona. Preparations for the mission provided experience for later joint American–Russian space flights, such as the Shuttle–Mir program and the International Space Station.

Apollo–Soyuz was the last crewed U.S. spaceflight for nearly six years until STS-1, the first launch of the Space Shuttle on 12 April 1981.

== Historical background ==
The purpose and catalyst of Apollo–Soyuz was the policy of détente between the two Cold War superpowers: the United States and the Soviet Union. Tensions ran high between the two world superpowers while the United States was engaged in the Vietnam War. Meanwhile, the Soviet press was highly critical of the Apollo space missions, printing "the armed intrusion of the United States and Saigon puppets into Laos is a shameless trampling underfoot of international law" over a photograph of the Apollo 14 launch in 1971. Although Soviet leader Nikita Khrushchev made the Soviet Union's policy of détente official in his 1956 doctrine of peaceful coexistence at the 20th Congress of the Communist Party of the Soviet Union, the two nations seemed to be in perpetual conflict.

After John Glenn's 1962 orbital flight, an exchange of letters between U.S. president John F. Kennedy and Soviet premier Nikita Khrushchev led to a series of discussions led by NASA Deputy Administrator Hugh Dryden and Soviet scientist Anatoly Blagonravov. Their 1962 talks led to the Dryden–Blagonravov agreement, which was formalized in October of that year, the same time the two countries were in the midst of the Cuban Missile Crisis. The agreement was formally announced at the United Nations on 5 December 1962. It called for cooperation on the exchange of data from weather satellites, a study of the Earth's magnetic field, and joint tracking of the NASA Echo II balloon satellite. Kennedy interested Khrushchev in a joint crewed Moon landing, but after the assassination of Kennedy in November 1963 and Khrushchev's removal from office in October 1964, the competition between the two nations' crewed space programs heated up, and talk of cooperation became less common, due to tense relations and military implications.

On April 19, 1971, the USSR launched the first piloted orbital space station, Salyut 1. Meanwhile, the United States had launched the Apollo 14 mission several months prior, the third mission to land on the Moon. Each side gave the other little coverage of their achievements.

With the close of the Vietnam War, relations between the United States and the USSR began to improve, as did the prognosis for a potential cooperative space mission. Apollo–Soyuz was made possible by the thaw in these relations, and the project itself endeavoured to amplify and solidify the improving relations between the United States and the Soviet Union. According to Soviet leader Leonid Brezhnev:

The Soviet and American spacemen will go up into outer space for the first major joint scientific experiment in the history of mankind. They know that from outer space our planet looks even more beautiful. It is big enough for us to live peacefully on it, but it is too small to be threatened by nuclear war.

Thus, both sides recognized ASTP as a political act of peace.

In October 1970, Soviet Academy of Sciences president Mstislav Keldysh responded to NASA Administrator Thomas O. Paine's letter proposing a cooperative space mission, and there was subsequently a meeting to discuss technical details. At a meeting in January 1971, U.S. president Richard Nixon's Foreign Policy Adviser Henry Kissinger enthusiastically espoused plans for the mission, and expressed these views to NASA administrator George Low: "As long as you stick to space, do anything you want to do. You are free to commit – in fact, I want you to tell your counterparts in Moscow that the President has sent you on this mission".

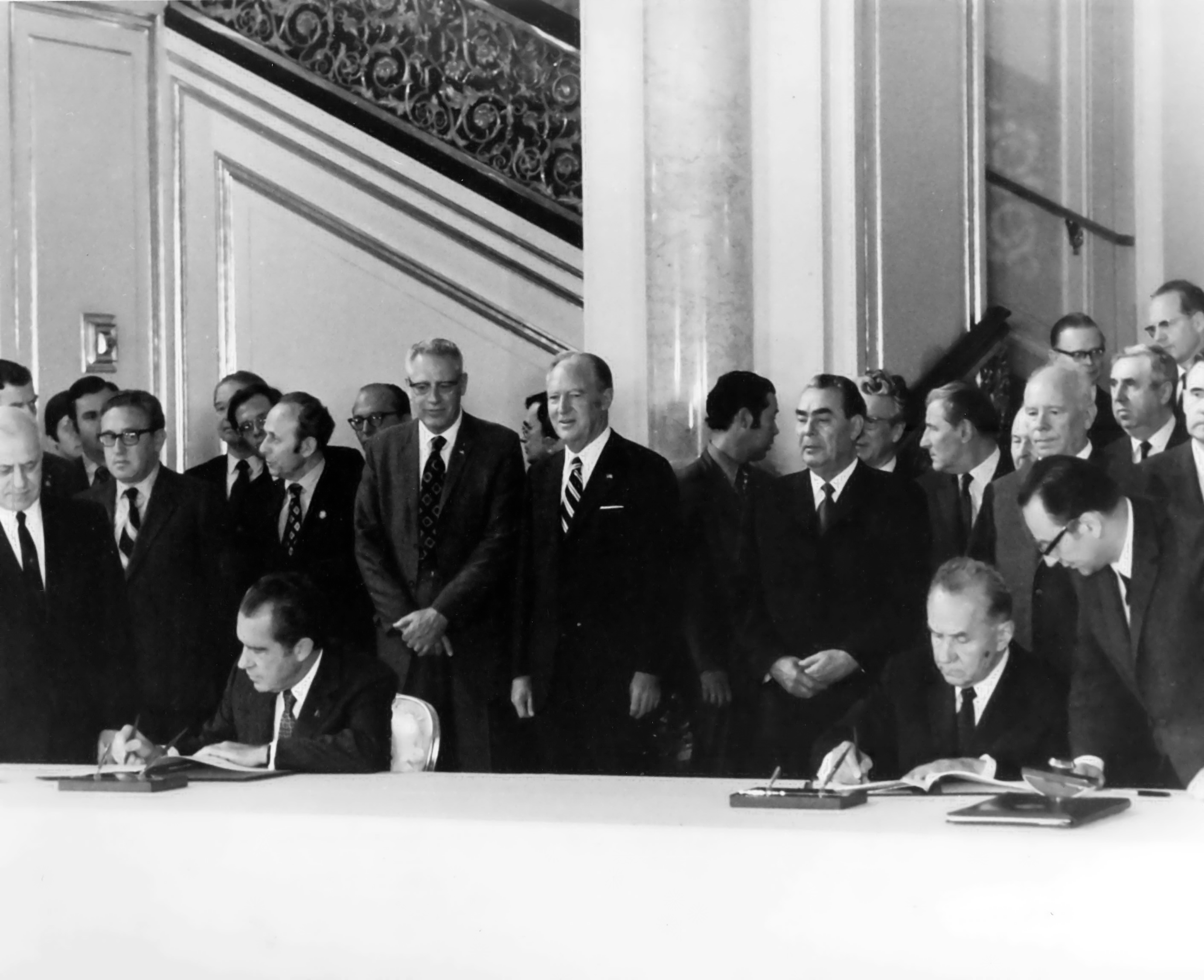
U.S. president Richard Nixon and Soviet Premier Alexei Kosygin (seated) sign an agreement in Moscow paving the way for the Apollo–Soyuz mission, May 1972.

Both sides had severe criticisms of the other side's engineering. Soviet spacecraft were designed with automation in mind; the Lunokhod 1 and Luna 16 were both uncrewed probes, and each Soyuz spacecraft had been designed to minimize risk due to human error by having fewer manual controls with which human operators would have to contend during flight. By contrast, the Apollo spacecraft was designed to be operated by humans and required highly trained astronauts to operate. The Soviet Union criticized the Apollo spacecraft as being "extremely complex and dangerous".

The Americans also had concerns about Soviet spacecraft. Christopher C. Kraft, director of the Johnson Space Center, criticized the design of the Soyuz:

"We in NASA rely on redundant components – if an instrument fails during flight, our crews switch to another in an attempt to continue the mission. Each Soyuz component, however, is designed for a specific function; if one fails, the cosmonauts land as soon as possible. The Apollo vehicle also relied on astronaut piloting to a much greater extent than did the Soyuz machine."

The American astronauts had a very low opinion for the Soyuz spacecraft as it was a craft that was designed to be controlled from the ground. This was in contrast with the Apollo module that was meant to be flown from the capsule. Eventually Glynn Lunney, the Manager of the Apollo–Soyuz Test Program, warned them about talking to the press about their dissatisfaction as they had offended the Soviets. NASA was worried that any slight would cause the Soviets to pull out and the mission to be scrapped.

American and Soviet engineers settled their differences for a possible docking of American and Soviet spacecraft in meetings between June and December 1971 in Houston and Moscow, including Bill Creasy's design of the Androgynous Peripheral Attach System (APAS) between the two ships that would allow either to be active or passive during docking.

By April 1972, both the United States and the USSR signed an Agreement Concerning Cooperation in the Exploration and Use of Outer Space for Peaceful Purposes, committing both the USSR and the United States to the launch of the Apollo–Soyuz Test Project in 1975.

The ASTP was the first Soviet space mission to be televised live during the launch, while in space, and during the landing. Soyuz 19 was also the first Soviet spacecraft to which a foreign flight crew had access before flight; the Apollo crew were permitted to inspect it and the launch and crew training site, which was an unprecedented sharing of information with Americans about any Soviet space program.

Not all reactions to ASTP were positive. Many Americans feared that ASTP was giving the USSR too much credit in their space program, putting them on equal footing with the sophisticated space exploration efforts of NASA. More feared that the apparent peaceful cooperation between the USSR and the United States would lull people into believing there was no conflict at all between the two superpowers. Some Soviet publicists called American critics of the mission "demagogues who stand against scientific cooperation with the USSR". At this time, tensions between the United States and the USSR had softened, and the project set a precedent for future cooperative projects in space.

== Apollo crew ==
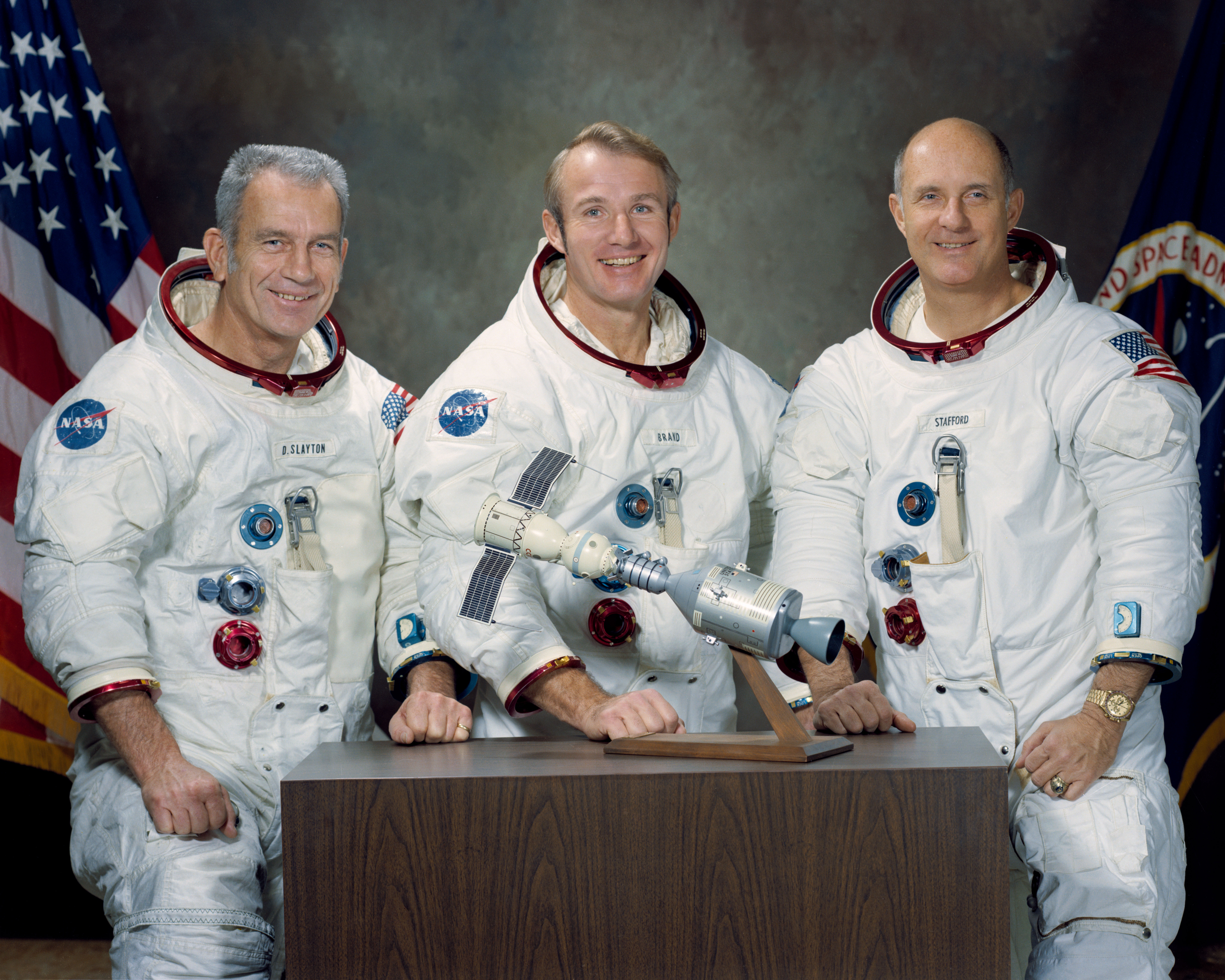
Left to right: Slayton, Brand, Stafford

Position	Astronaut
Commander	Thomas P. Stafford; Fourth and last spaceflight
Command module pilot	Vance D. Brand; First spaceflight
Docking module pilot	Donald K. Slayton; Only spaceflight

=== Backup crew ===
Position	Astronaut
Commander	Alan Bean
Command Module Pilot	Ronald Evans
Docking Module Pilot	Jack R. Lousma

=== Crew notes ===
It was American astronaut Deke Slayton's only space flight. He was chosen as one of the original Mercury Seven astronauts in April 1959, but had been grounded until 1972 for medical reasons.

Jack Swigert had originally been assigned as the command module pilot for the ASTP prime crew, but he was removed before the official announcement as punishment for his involvement in the Apollo 15 postal covers incident.

Support crew
Karol J. Bobko, Robert Crippen, Robert F. Overmyer, Richard H. Truly

Flight directors
Pete Frank (Orange team), Neil Hutchinson (Silver team), Don Puddy (Crimson team), Frank Littleton (Amber team)

== Soyuz crew ==
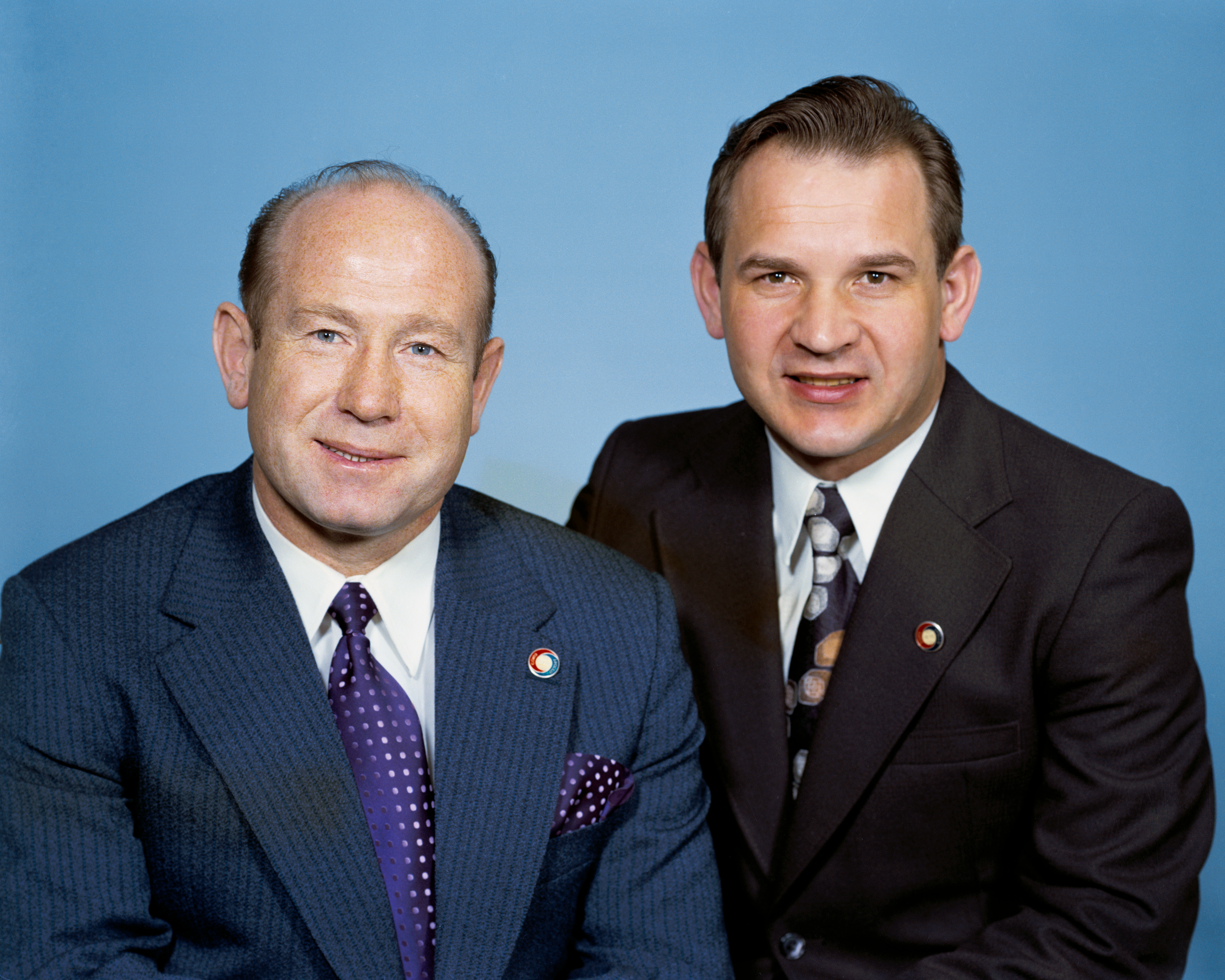
Leonov (left) and Kubasov

Position	Cosmonaut
Commander	Alexei Leonov; Second and last spaceflight
Flight engineer	Valery Kubasov; Second spaceflight

It was the last space mission for Soviet cosmonaut Alexei Leonov, who had become the first person to walk in space during the March 1965 Voskhod 2 mission.

=== Backup crew ===
Position	Cosmonaut
Commander	Anatoly Filipchenko
Flight engineer	Nikolai Rukavishnikov

== Mission summary ==
=== Background ===
U.S.-Soviet Joint Space Mission (1975) Official NASA information film reel.

The ASTP entailed the docking of an American Apollo command and service module (CSM) with a Soviet Soyuz 7K-TM spacecraft. Although the Soyuz was given a mission designation number (Soyuz 19) as part of the ongoing Soyuz programme, its radio call sign was simply "Soyuz" for the duration of the joint mission. The Apollo mission was not a numbered mission of the Apollo program, and similarly bore the call sign "Apollo". Despite this, the press and NASA have referred to the mission as "Apollo 18", but this should not be confused with the canceled lunar mission.

Apollo-Soyuz docking adapter deployed from the Saturn S-IVB upper-stage.

The Apollo spacecraft was launched with a docking module specially designed to enable the two spacecraft to dock with each other, used only once for this mission. The Saturn IB launch vehicle and CSM were surplus material. Like the Apollo Lunar Module, the docking module had to be retrieved from the S-IVB upper-stage of the Saturn IB rocket after launch. The docking module was designed as both an airlock – as the Apollo was pressurized at about 5 psi (34 kPa) using pure oxygen, while the Soyuz used a nitrogen/oxygen atmosphere at sea level pressure (about 15 psi (100 kPa)) – and an adapter, since the surplus Apollo hardware used for the ASTP mission was not equipped with the APAS docking collar jointly developed by NASA and the Academy of Sciences of the Soviet Union for the mission. One end of the docking module was attached to the Apollo using the same "probe-and-drogue" docking mechanism used on the Lunar Module and the Skylab space station, while its other end had the APAS docking collar, which Soyuz 19 carried in place of the standard Soyuz/Salyut system of the time. The APAS collar fitted onto Soyuz 19 was releasable, allowing the two spacecraft to separate in case of malfunction.

Apollo-Soyuz docking.

The Apollo flew with a three-man crew on board: Tom Stafford, Vance Brand, and Deke Slayton. Stafford had already flown into space three times, including within eight nautical miles of the lunar surface as Commander of Apollo 10, and was the first general officer to fly into space. He was a brigadier general in the United States Air Force at the time of the flight; he would retire with three stars in 1979. Slayton was one of the original Mercury Seven astronauts selected in 1959, but an irregular heartbeat grounded him until 1972. He became head of NASA's astronaut office and, after a lengthy medical program, selected himself for this mission. At the time, Slayton was the oldest person to fly in space and the one with the longest gap between selection as an astronaut and first flight into space. Brand, meanwhile, had trained with the Apollo spacecraft during his time as a backup Apollo 15 command module pilot, and had served two stints as a backup Skylab commander. The closest he had come to flying prior to ASTP was as commander for the Skylab Rescue mission mustered to potentially retrieve the crew of Skylab 3 due to a fuel leak on that mission's Apollo CSM.

Apollo-Soyuz docking module development test.

The Soyuz flew with two men: Alexei Leonov and Valery Kubasov. Leonov became the first man to walk in space on Voskhod 2 in March 1965. Kubasov, who flew on Soyuz 6 in 1969, ran some of the earliest space manufacturing experiments. Both were to have flown on the ill-fated Soyuz 11 in 1971 (Leonov as commander, Kubasov as the flight engineer), but were grounded because Kubasov was suspected of having tuberculosis. The two-man crew on the Soyuz was a result of the modifications needed to allow the cosmonauts to wear the Sokol space suit during launch, docking, and reentry.

Apollo-Soyuz crew ground-training.

The ASTP-class Soyuz 7K-TM spacecraft used was a variation of the post-Soyuz 11 two-man design, with the batteries replaced by solar panels enabling "solo" flights (missions not docking to one of the Salyut space stations). It was designed to operate, during the docking phase, at a reduced nitrogen/oxygen pressure of 10.2 psi (70 kPa), allowing easier transfers between the Apollo and Soyuz. Six ASTP-class Soyuz spacecraft were built in total, including the one used. Before the actual mission, two craft were launched uncrewed as Kosmos satellites. The third was launched as the crewed Soyuz 16 flight as a rehearsal in order to test the APAS docking mechanism. Another craft was used fully fueled as a "hot backup" at the launch site – later it was disassembled. And the sixth craft was available as a "cold" backup; it was later used on the last "solo" Soyuz flight in 1976, but with the APAS docking adapter replaced by the MKF-6 multispectral camera.

=== Launch and mission ===
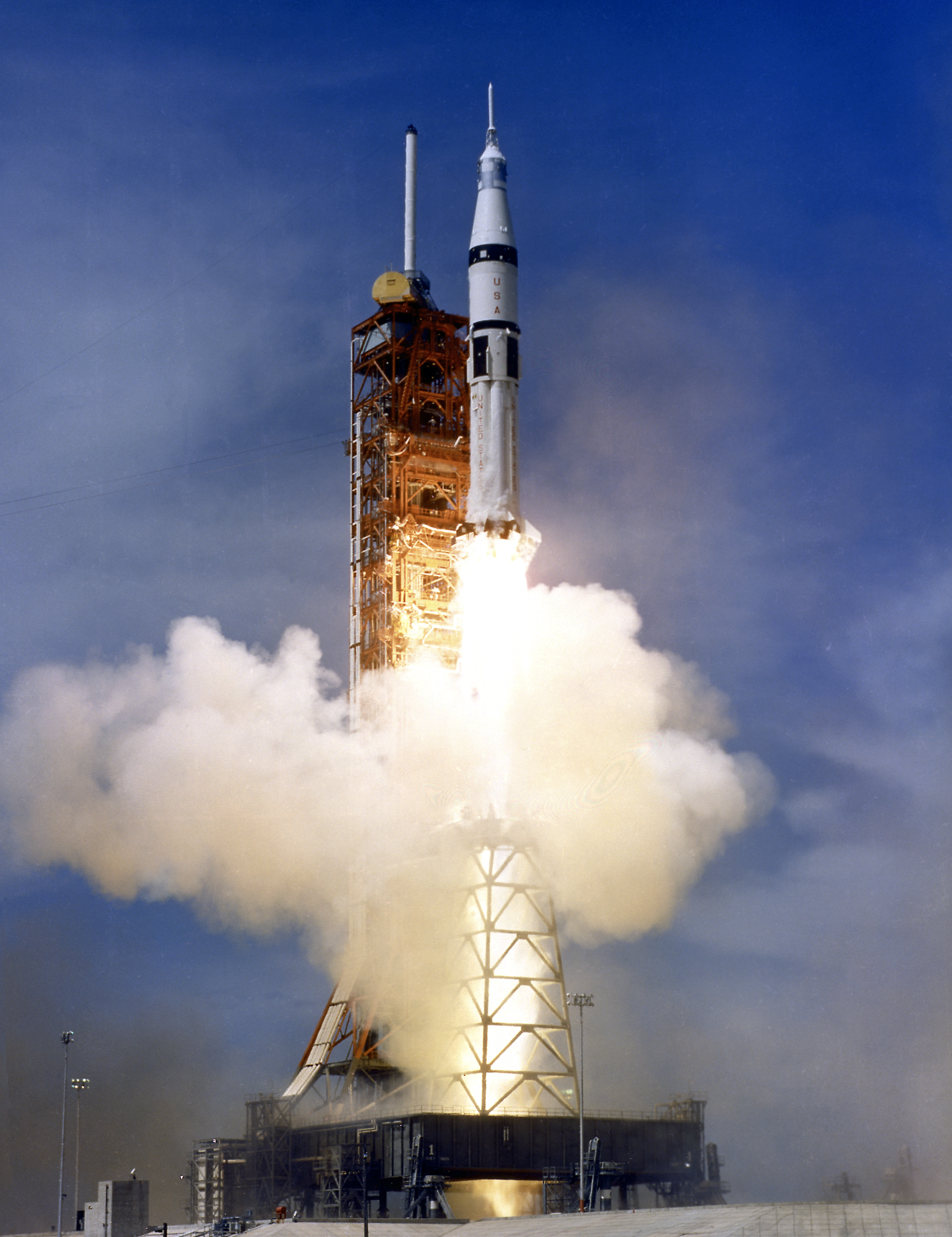
A Saturn IB launch launches from the "milkstool" platform on LC-39B and lifts the American ASTP crew into orbit.

The Soyuz and Apollo flights launched within seven-and-a-half hours of each other on July 15, 1975, and docked on July 17, 1975. Three hours later, the two mission commanders, Stafford and Leonov, exchanged the first international handshake in space through the open hatch of the Soyuz. NASA had calculated that the historic handshake would have taken place over the British seaside resort of Bognor Regis, but a delay resulted in its occurrence being over the city of Metz in France. During the first crew exchange, the crews were read a statement from Soviet General Secretary Leonid Brezhnev, and received a phone call from U.S. president Gerald Ford.

While the two ships were docked, the three Americans and two Soviets conducted joint scientific experiments, exchanged flags and gifts (including tree seeds which were later planted in the two countries), listened to each other's music (examples include "Tenderness" by Maya Kristalinskaya and "Why Can't We Be Friends?" by War), signed certificates, visited each other's ships, ate together, and conversed in each other's languages. (Because of Stafford's pronounced drawl when speaking Russian, Leonov later joked that there were three languages spoken on the mission: Russian, English, and "Oklahomski".) There were also docking and redocking maneuvers, during which the two spacecraft reversed roles and the Soyuz became the "active" ship.

American scientists developed four of the experiments performed during the mission. Embryologist Jane Oppenheimer analyzed the effects of weightlessness on fish eggs at various stages of development.

The ships were docked for 1 day, 23 hours, seven minutes, and three seconds. After 44 hours together, the two ships separated, and maneuvered to use the Apollo to create an artificial solar eclipse to allow the crew of the Soyuz to take photographs of the solar corona. Another brief docking was made before the ships went their separate ways. The Soviets remained in space for two more days, and the Americans for five, during which the Apollo crew also conducted Earth observation experiments.

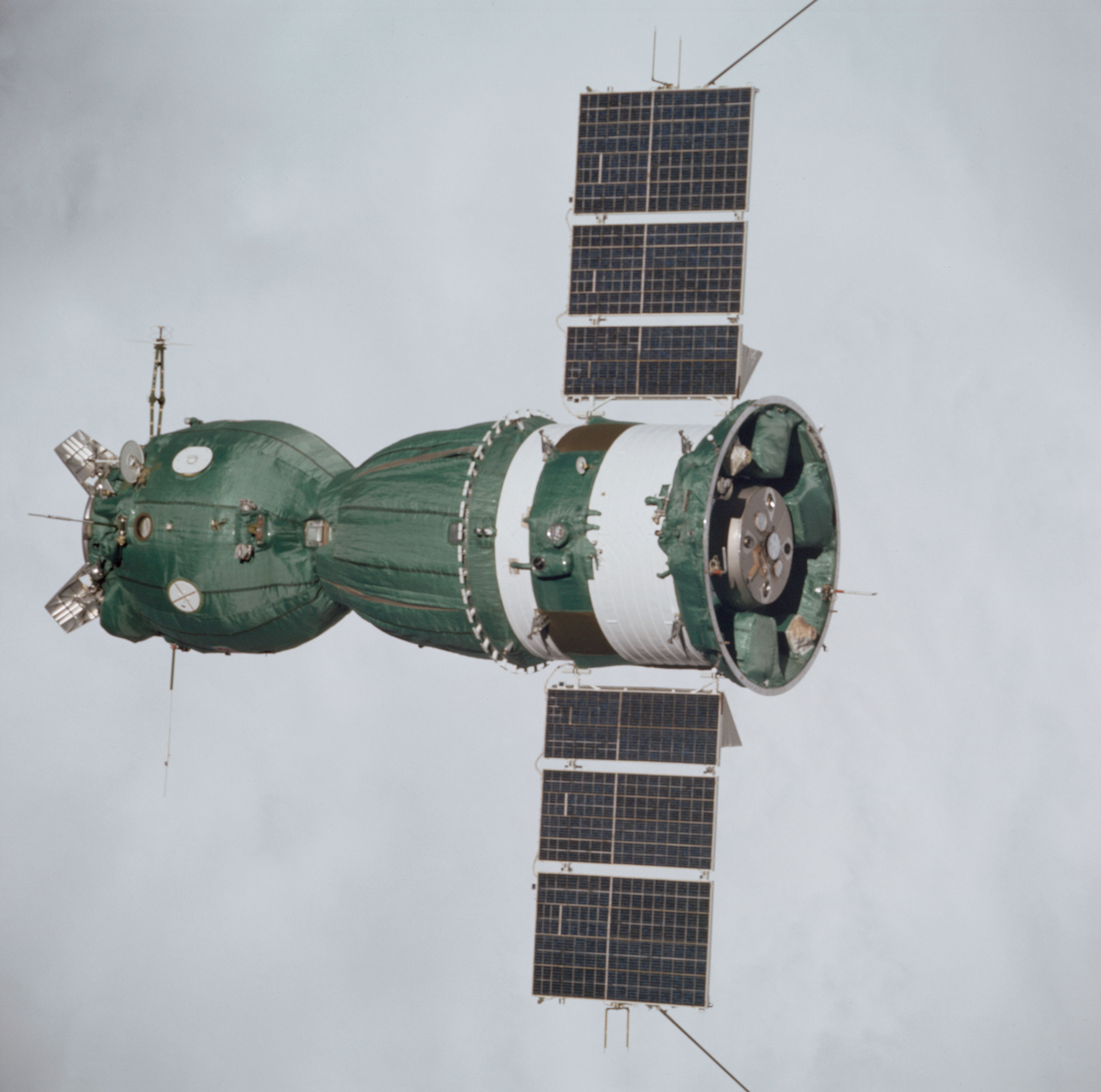
Soyuz 19 as seen from the Apollo spacecraft

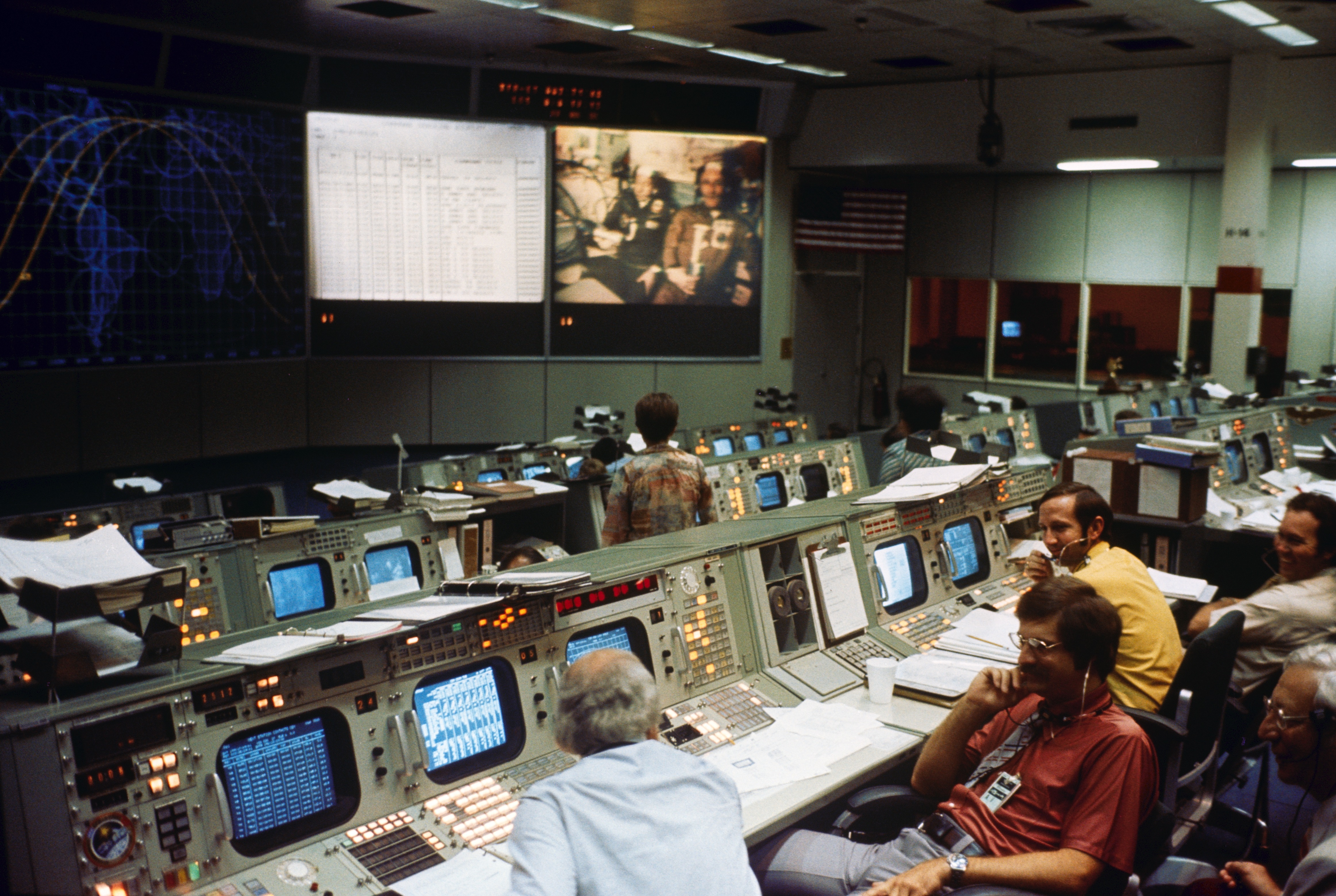
Mission control center in Houston during ASTP

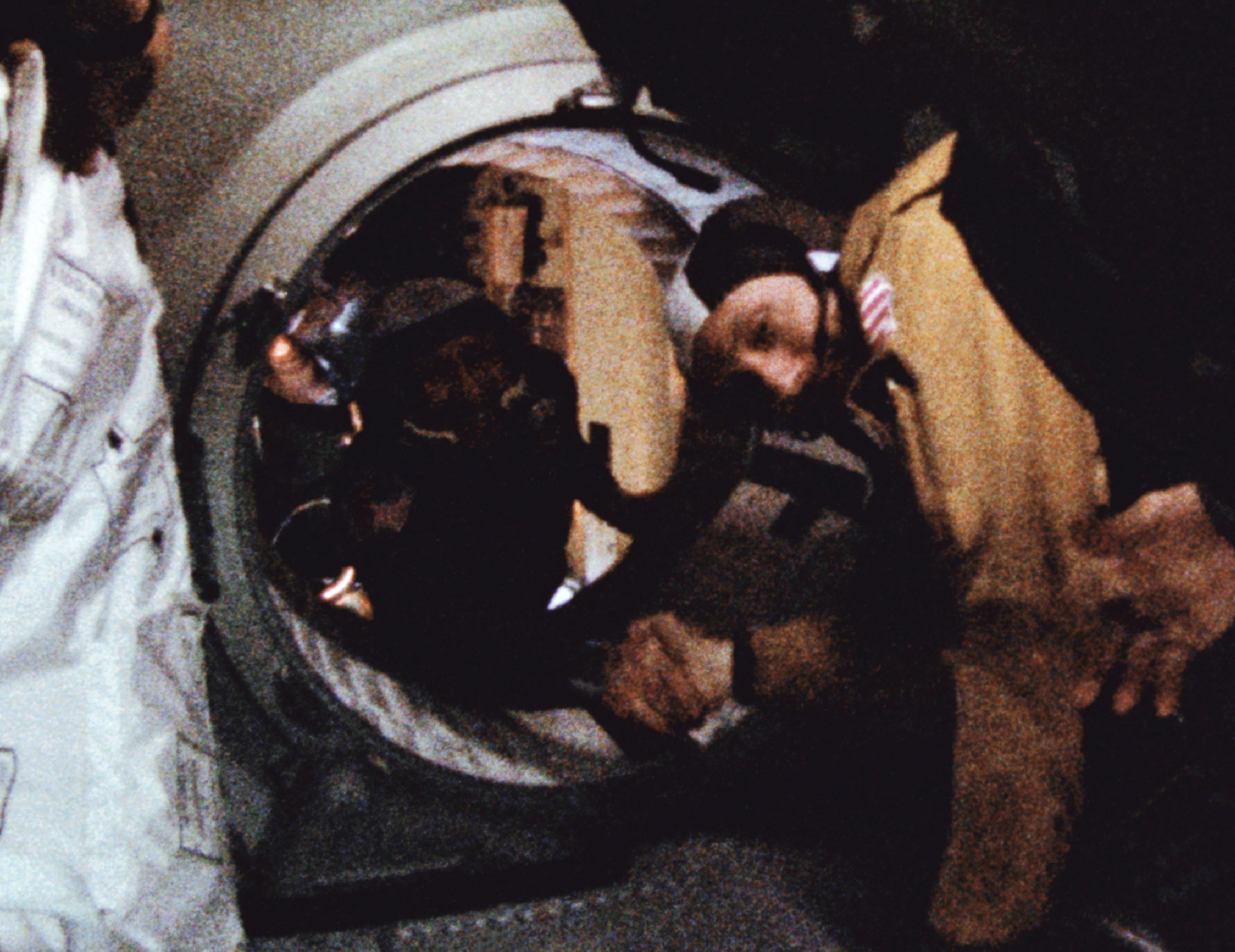
The historic handshake between Stafford and Leonov

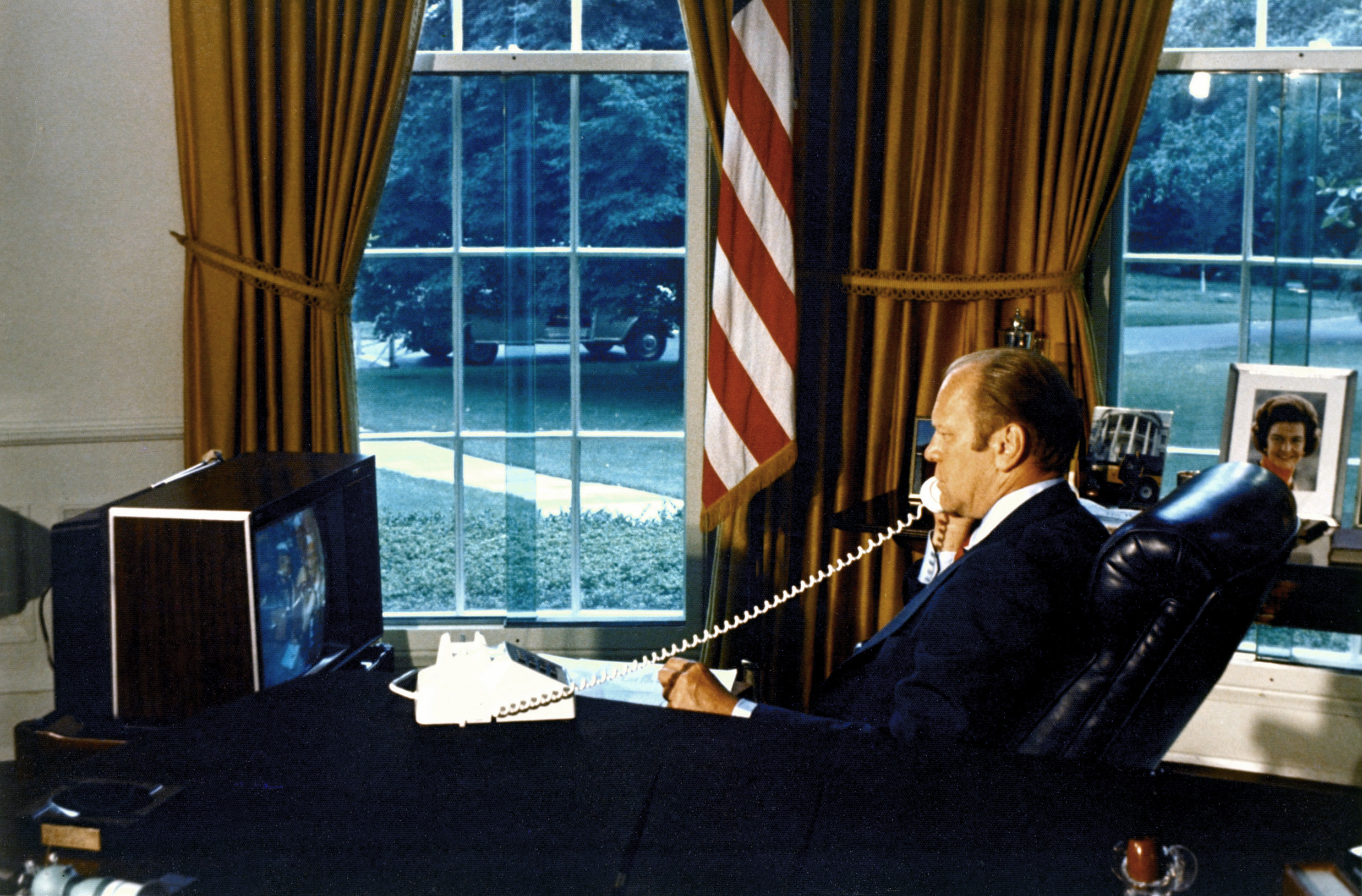
U.S. president Gerald Ford speaks to the Soviet and American crews on 18 July 1975.

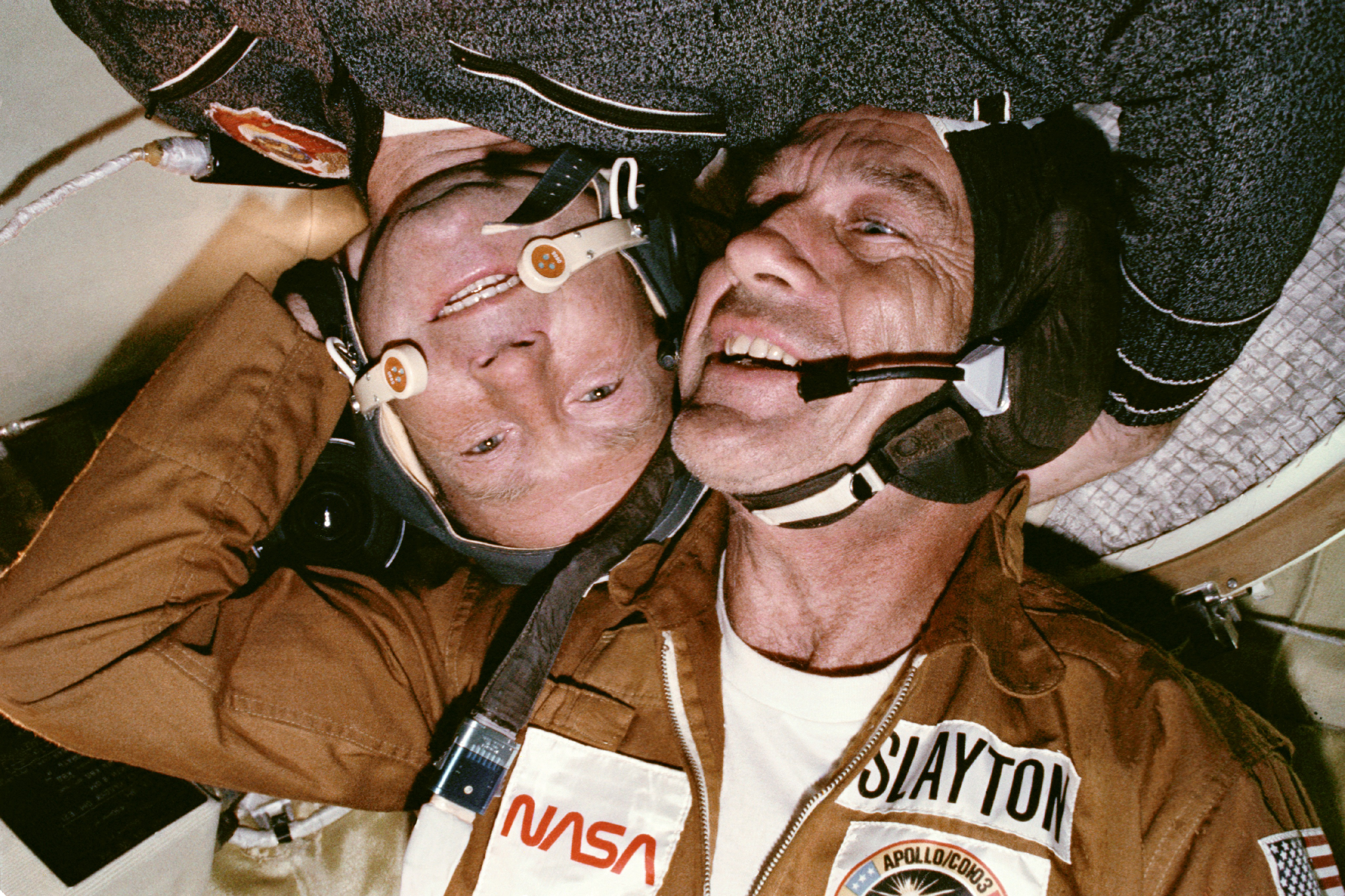
Deke Slayton (right) with Leonov in the Soyuz spacecraft

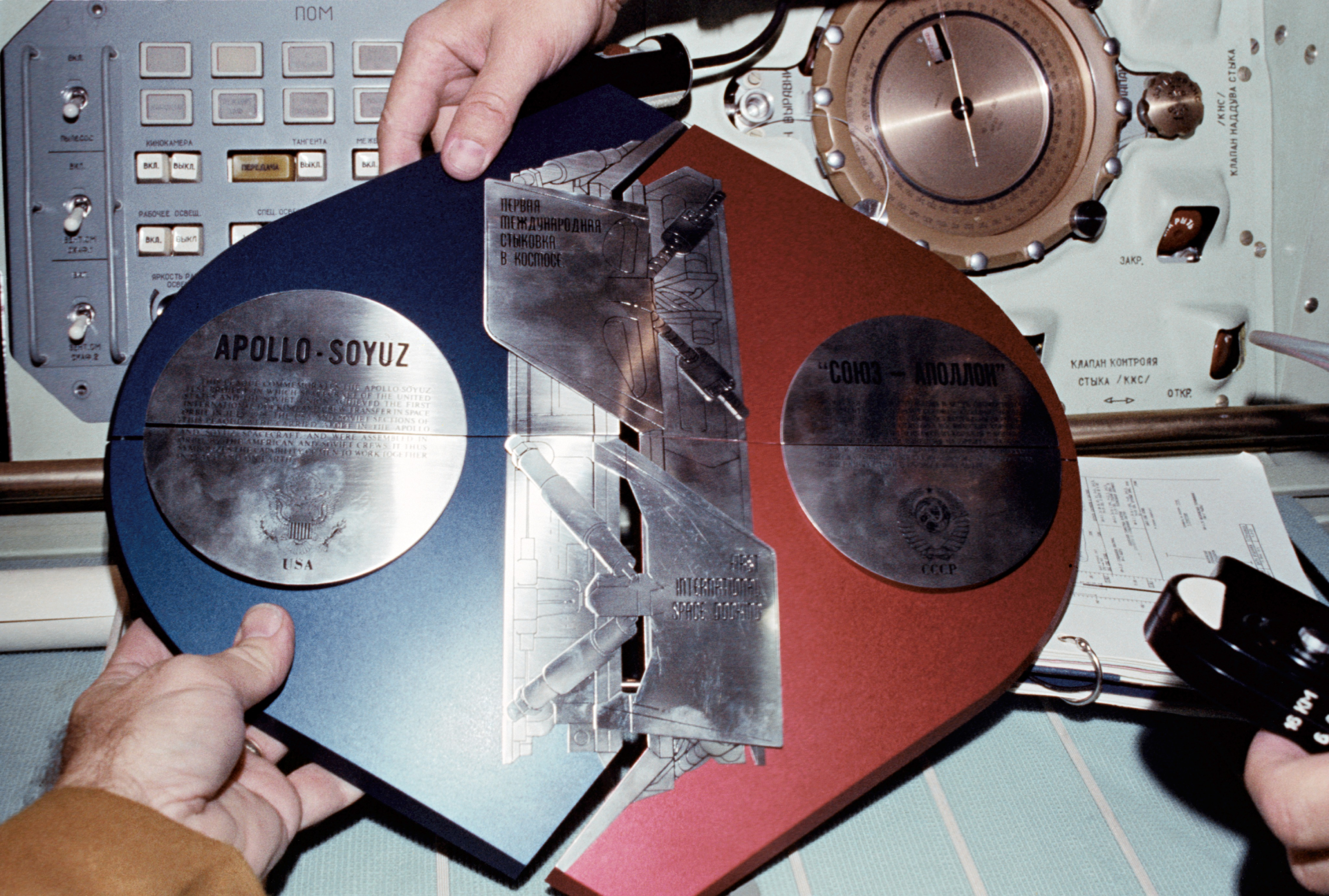
The astronauts and cosmonauts assembled this commemorative plaque in orbit as a symbol of the international cooperation.

=== Re-entry and aftermath ===
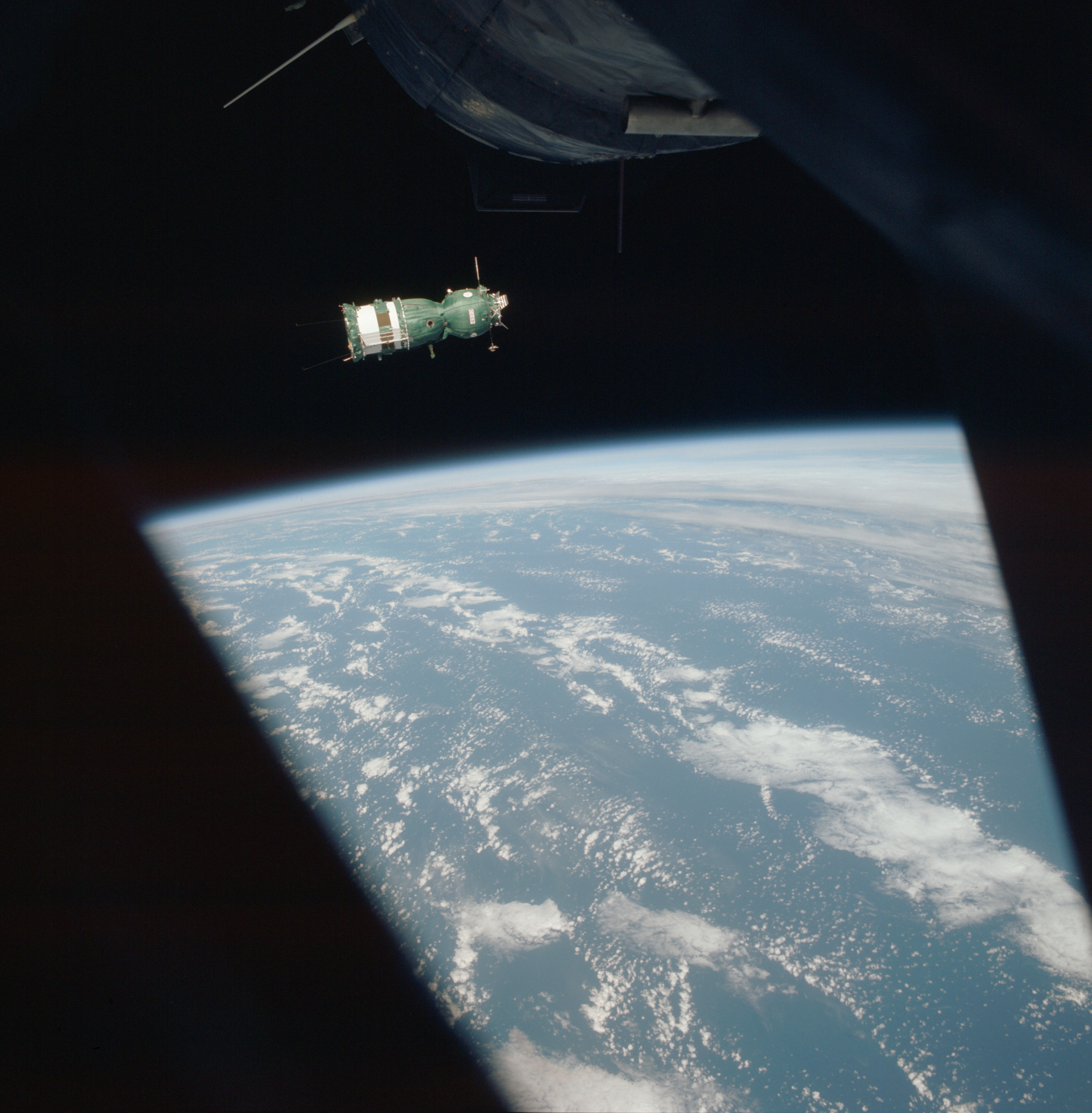
Soyuz as seen from Apollo CM.

The mission was considered a great success, both technically and as a public-relations exercise for both nations. The only serious problem was during reentry and splashdown of the Apollo craft, during which the crew were accidentally exposed to toxic monomethylhydrazine and nitrogen tetroxide fumes, caused by unignited reaction control system (RCS) hypergolic propellants venting from the spacecraft and reentering a cabin air intake. The RCS was inadvertently left on during descent, and the toxic fumes were sucked into the spacecraft as it drew in outside air. Brand briefly lost consciousness, while Stafford retrieved emergency oxygen masks, put one on Brand, and gave one to Slayton. The three astronauts were hospitalized for two weeks in Honolulu, Hawaii. Brand took responsibility for the mishap; because of high noise levels in the cabin during reentry, he believed he was unable to hear Stafford call off one item of the reentry checklist, the closure of two switches which would have automatically shut off the RCS and begun drogue parachute deployment. These procedures were manually performed later than usual, allowing the ingestion of the propellant fumes through the ventilation system. The ATSP was also the last crewed NASA mission to be recovered by the United States Navy until Artemis II in 2026.

The ASTP was the final flight of an Apollo spacecraft. Immediately after the launch of the Apollo spacecraft, preparations began to convert LC-39B and the Vehicle Assembly Building at Kennedy Space Center for use by the Space Shuttle, the United States' next crewed spacecraft program. LC-39A had already been closed after the launch of Skylab.

== Legacy ==
=== Technical ===
Apollo–Soyuz painting by cosmonaut Alexei Leonov

A derivative (but mechanically incompatible) docking collar, APAS-89, was launched as part of the Kristall module of the Soviet Mir space station. Originally intended as the docking port for the Buran Soviet space shuttle, the APAS-89 unit was used for the next Russian–American docking mission, STS-71, twenty years later as part of the Shuttle–Mir program (though not before the docking port was tested by the last APAS-equipped Soyuz, Soyuz TM-16, in 1993).

The American Space Shuttle continued to use the same APAS-89 docking hardware through the end of the Space Shuttle program to dock to Mir and then the International Space Station, the latter through the Pressurized Mating Adapters (PMAs).

The PMAs are equipped with the later APAS-95 adapters, which differ from the APAS-89 adapters in that they are no longer androgynous; while compatible with the APAS-89 docking collars, they are not capable of acting as the "active" partner in docking.

The first PMA, PMA-1, remains in use as the interface connecting the Russian-built, NASA-owned Zarya module to the US segment of the ISS (USOS), and so the APAS continues in use to this day (2024).

=== Political ===
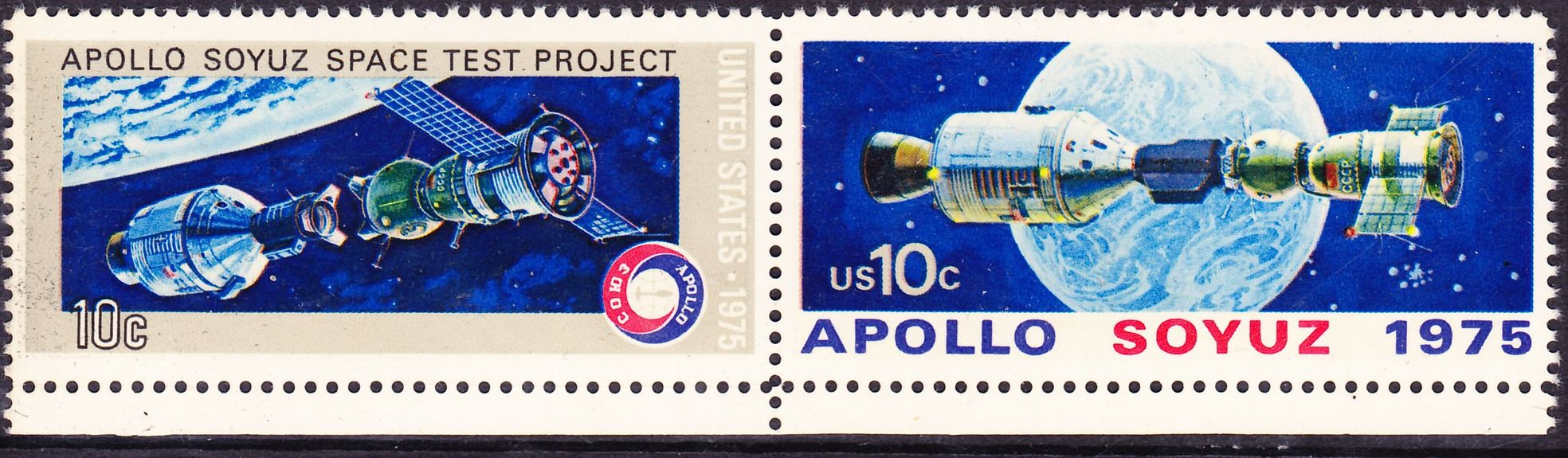
Apollo–Soyuz, Issue of 1975, USA

Apollo–Soyuz was the first joint US–Soviet space mission. At the time it was thought that space would become either more international or competitive as a result, but it became both. The mission became symbolic of each country's goals of scientific cooperation, while their news reports downplayed the technical prowess of the other. Soviet press implied that it was leading the United States in space flight, tying it to the Marxist–Leninist ideology, while the United States reported that the Soyuz was technically primitive. High-profile space cooperation declined after the successful mission and became entangled in linkage politics, but it set a precedent of cooperation that continued in the Shuttle–Mir Program.

=== Cultural ===
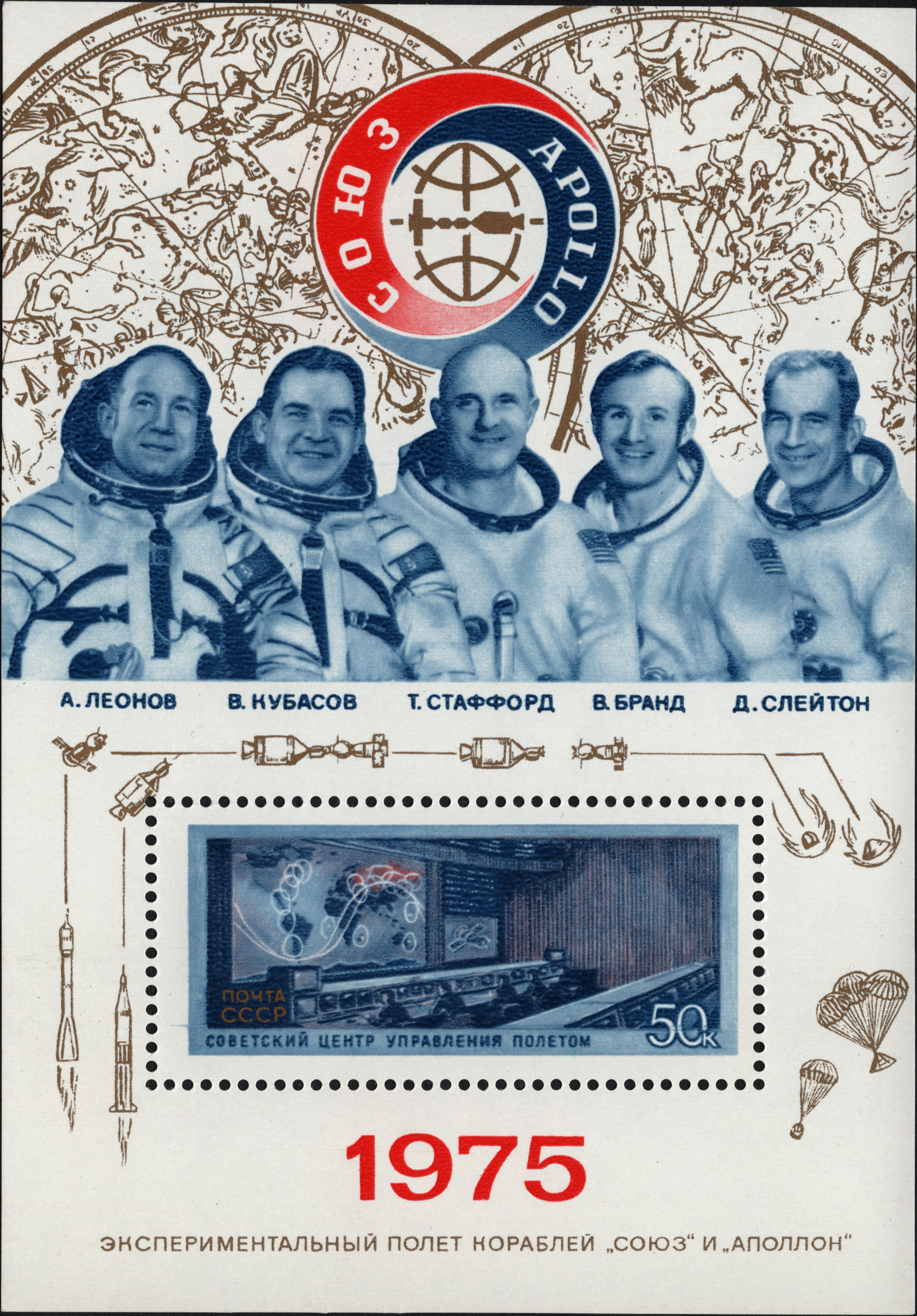
Soyuz–Apollo, Issue of 1975, USSR

The American and Soviet commanders, Stafford and Leonov, became lasting friends. Leonov was the godfather of Stafford's younger children. Stafford gave a eulogy at Leonov's funeral in October 2019.

An asteroid, 2228 Soyuz-Apollo, discovered in 1977 by Soviet astronomer Nikolai Chernykh, is named after the mission.

To commemorate Apollo–Soyuz, renowned British/Irish bartender Joe Gilmore of The Savoy Hotel's American Bar created the 'Link-Up' cocktail. When the astronauts were told the cocktail was being flown out from London to be enjoyed on their return, they said, "Tell Joe we want it up here".

=== Scientific ===
The Apollo craft carried the SAG telescope designed to observe in the extreme ultraviolet. Across several orbits of observing the instrument discovered two ultraviolet sources, HZ 43 and FEIGE 24, both of which were white dwarfs. Other stars observed included, Proxima Centauri (a Red Dwarf), SS Cygni (a Binary star), and Sirius (also a Binary star). A third possible discovery was an unknown object in the constellation Pavo. The star HD 192273 was later suggested as a candidate for the Pavo observation but further study concluded that the star's distance and spectral class made this unlikely.

== Spacecraft locations ==
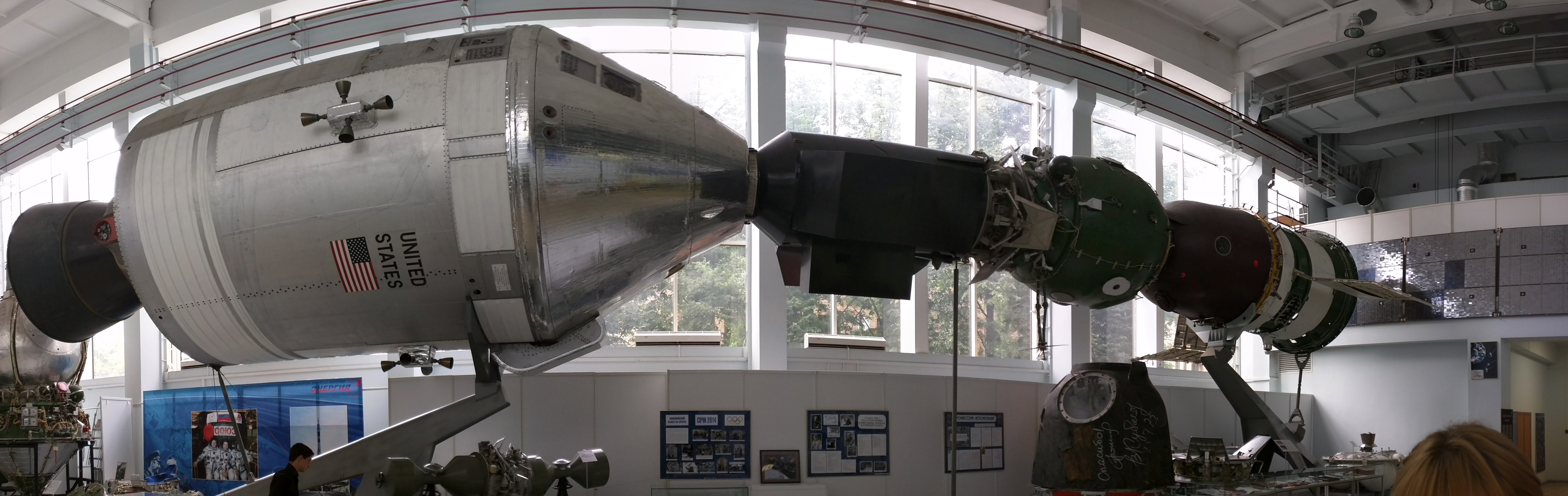
Model of joined Apollo and Soyuz at the RKK Energia Museum near Moscow, with the Soyuz descent module visible to the lower right

The Apollo command module from the mission is on display at the California Science Center in Los Angeles. The descent module of Soyuz 19 is on display at the RKK Energiya museum in Korolyov, Russia.

A display at the National Air and Space Museum in Washington, D.C. shows the docked Apollo/Soyuz configuration. The display is made up of the unflown Apollo Command and Service Module 105 (used for vibration testing for the Skylab program), the back-up Docking Module, and an unflown Soyuz spacecraft, on loan from the Russian government.

== Commemorations ==
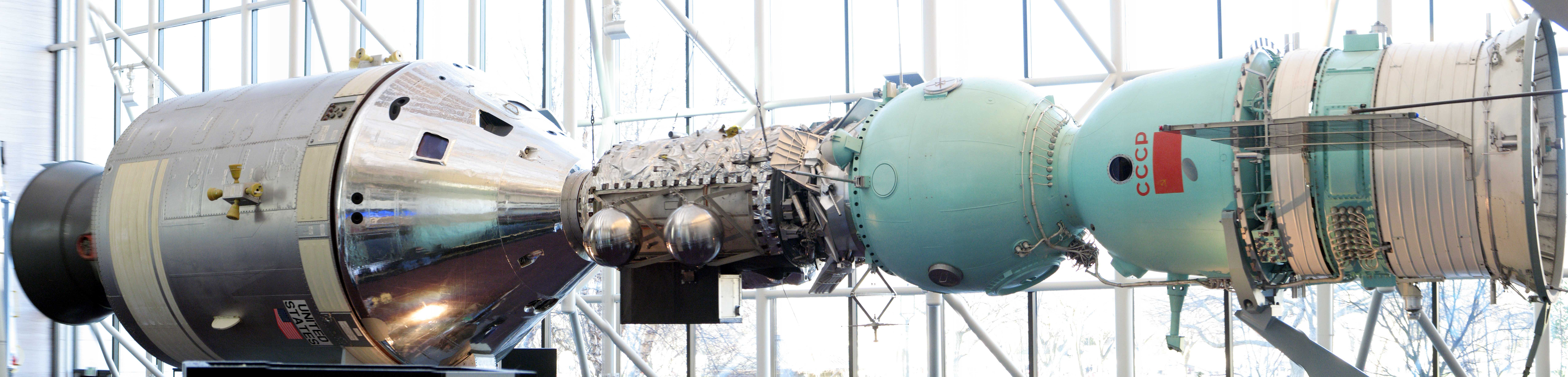
Model of joined Apollo and Soyuz at the National Air and Space Museum in Washington, DC, using the backup Docking Module

The United States Postal Service issued the Apollo–Soyuz commemorative stamps, honoring the United States–Soviet link up in space, on 15 July 1975, the day of the launch.

The remaining crew's most recent reunion was on 16 July 2010, when Leonov, Kubasov, Stafford, and Brand met at an Omega timepiece store in New York City. All except Leonov participated in a public roundtable that evening. Omega had produced several watches to be used on the mission.

=== Monument ===
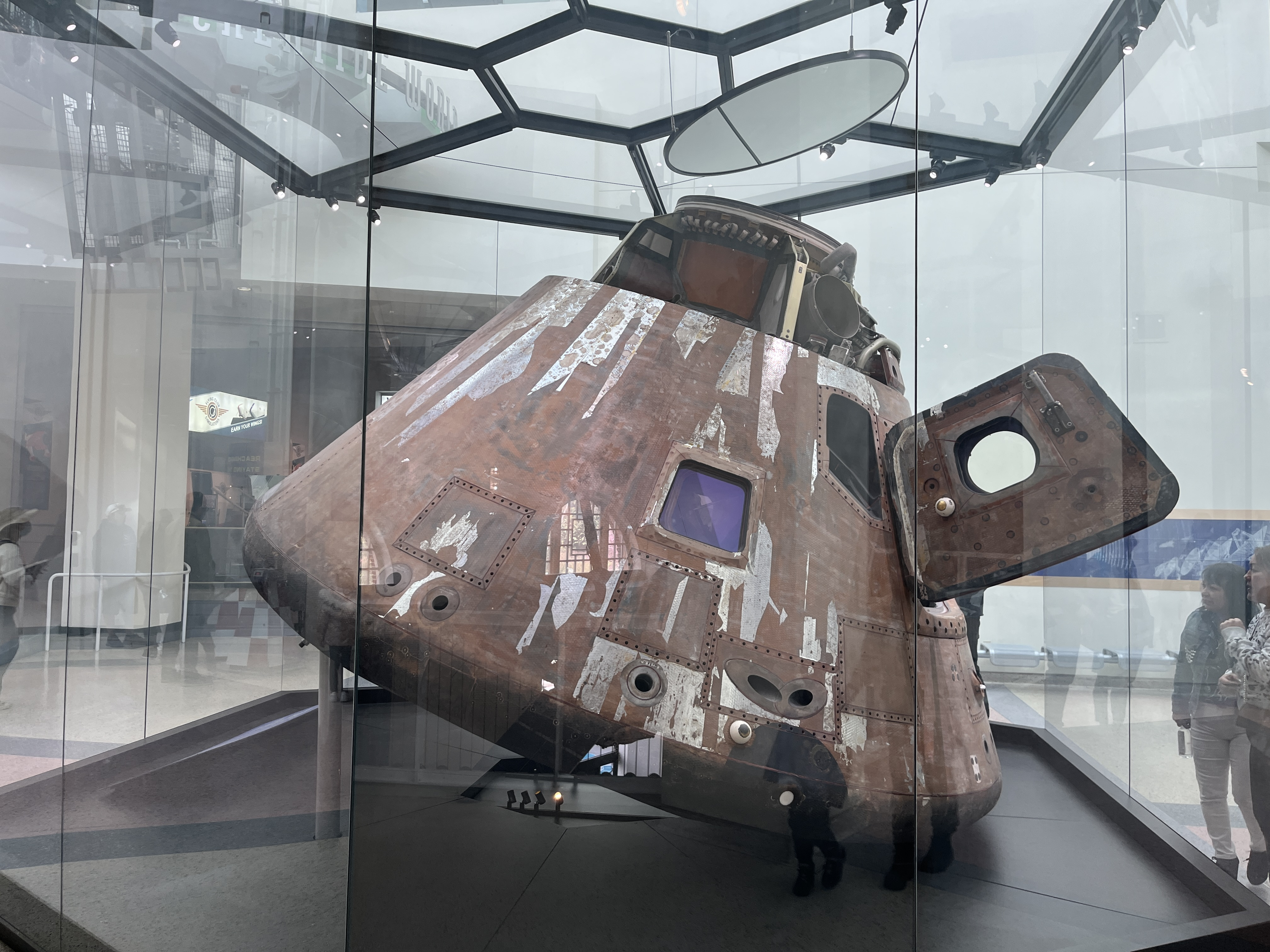
The Apollo command module from the mission on display at the California Science Center

A large Soyuz–Apollo monument was constructed outside the Soviet (now Russian) space control center RKA Mission Control Center (Russian acronym: TsUP) in Moscow. It consisted of a metal scale model of Earth overarched by an arc terminating in the joined Soyuz–Apollo spacecraft. It was damaged when a vehicle collided with it in the late 1990s, and was removed for repairs.

=== Mission Control Center ===
The mission control room that hosted the Americans in Korolyov, Russia, was preserved as a memorial to the Soyuz–Apollo mission.

== Program cost ==
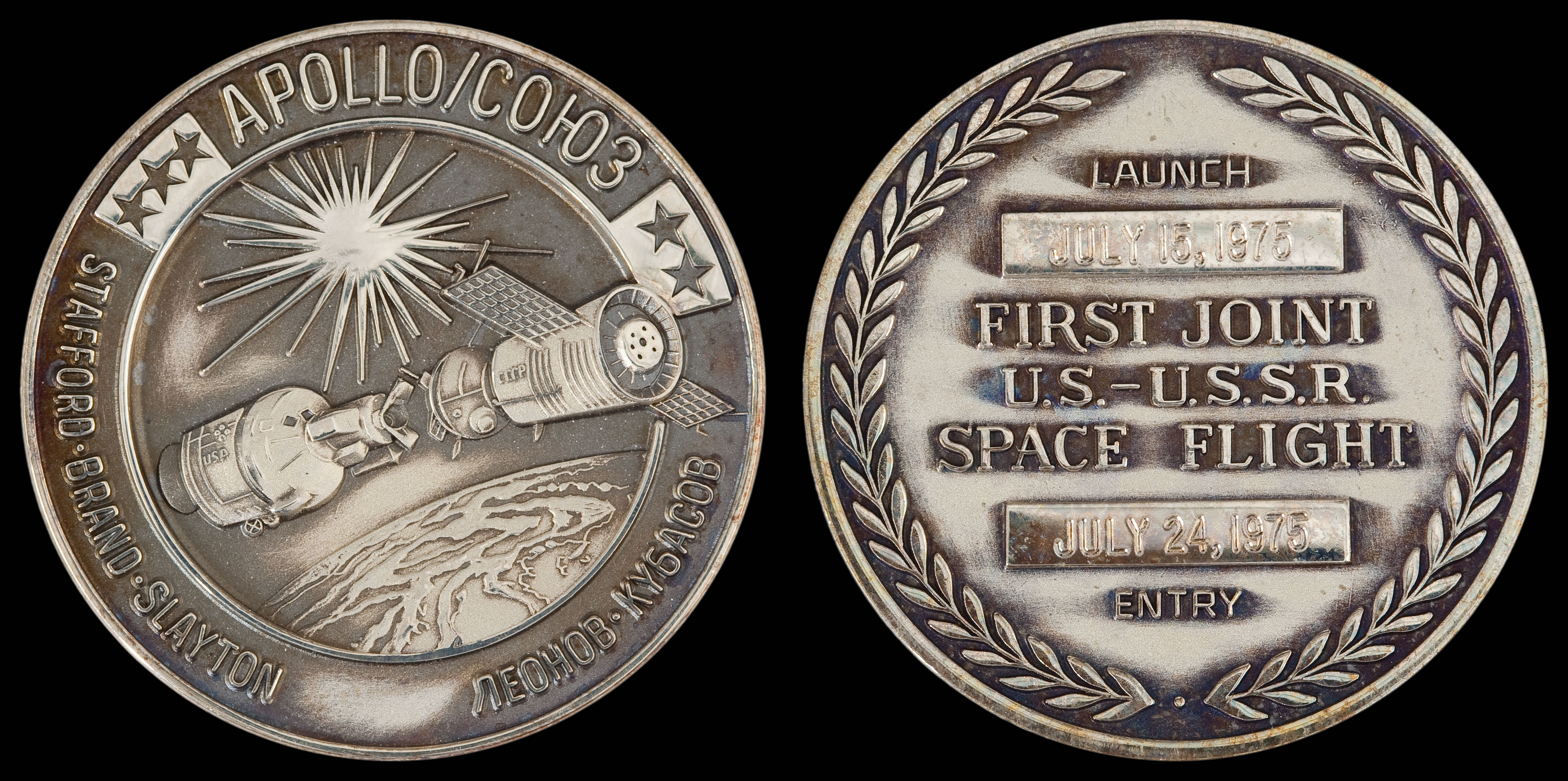
Apollo–Soyuz medallion

The United States Postal Service issued the Apollo–Soyuz commemorative stamps, honoring the United States–Soviet link up in space, on 15 July 1975, the day of the launch.

The United States spent US$245 million (equal to $1,470,000,000 today) on the Apollo–Soyuz project and spacecraft.

The amount of money the Soviet Union spent on the ASTP is unknown but reportedly constituted a "significant portion."

== See also ==
- Interkosmos, a Soviet space program from 1967 to 1994, designed to give foreign nations access to space missions.
- For All Mankind, an alternate history streaming series that depicts a fictionalized Apollo–Soyuz mission in its second season
- Final Orbit, a 2025 alternate history novel by Chris Hadfield where the Apollo–Soyuz mission goes wrong
