= Alikhan Ramazanov =

Russian footballer

Personal information
- Full name: Alikhan Maksudovich Ramazanov
- Date of birth: 31 August 1976 (age 50)
- Height: 1.70 m (5 ft 7 in)
- Positions: Defender; midfielder

Senior career*
Years	Team	Apps	(Gls)
1993–1999	FC Anzhi Makhachkala	135	(13)
1999	PFC Spartak Nalchik	12	(0)
2000–2001	FC SKA Rostov-on-Don	65	(3)
2002–2003	FC Terek Grozny	40	(1)
2004	FC Spartak-UGP Anapa (amateur)		
2005	FC Angusht Nazran	19	(0)
2006	FC SKA Rostov-on-Don	23	(0)
2007	FC Nika Krasny Sulin (amateur)		
2007–2009	FC Bataysk-2007	62	(1)
- * Club domestic league appearances and goals

Alikhan Maksudovich Ramazanov (Russian: Алихан Максудович Рамазанов; born 31 August 1976) is a former Russian professional football player.

== Club career ==
He made his Russian Football National League debut for FC Anzhi Makhachkala on 22 April 1997 in a game against FC Gazovik-Gazprom Izhevsk. He played 4 seasons in the FNL in his career.

== See also ==
- Football in Russia
