= Sergei Tyumentsev =

Russian footballer

Personal information
- Full name: Sergei Yuryevich Tyumentsev
- Date of birth: 9 August 1976 (age 50)
- Height: 1.79 m (5 ft 10 1/2 in)
- Position: Midfielder

Senior career*
Years	Team	Apps	(Gls)
1992	FC Irtysh Omsk	4	(0)
1993–1998	FC Dynamo Omsk	148	(12)
1998	FC Irtysh Omsk	15	(0)
1999	FC Dynamo Omsk	30	(3)
2000	FC Irtysh Omsk	24	(3)
2001–2006	FC SKA-Energiya Khabarovsk	198	(8)
2007–2008	FC Irtysh-1946 Omsk	25	(2)
2008	FC KUZBASS Kemerovo	14	(0)
2009	FC Sakhalin Yuzhno-Sakhalinsk	21	(0)
- * Club domestic league appearances and goals

Sergei Yuryevich Tyumentsev (Russian: Серге́й Юрьевич Тюменцев; born 9 August 1976) is a former Russian professional football player.

== Club career ==
He played 7 seasons in the Russian Football National League for FC Irtysh Omsk and FC SKA-Energiya Khabarovsk.
