= Portrait of Varya Adoratskaya =

1914 painting by Russian artist Nicolai Fechin

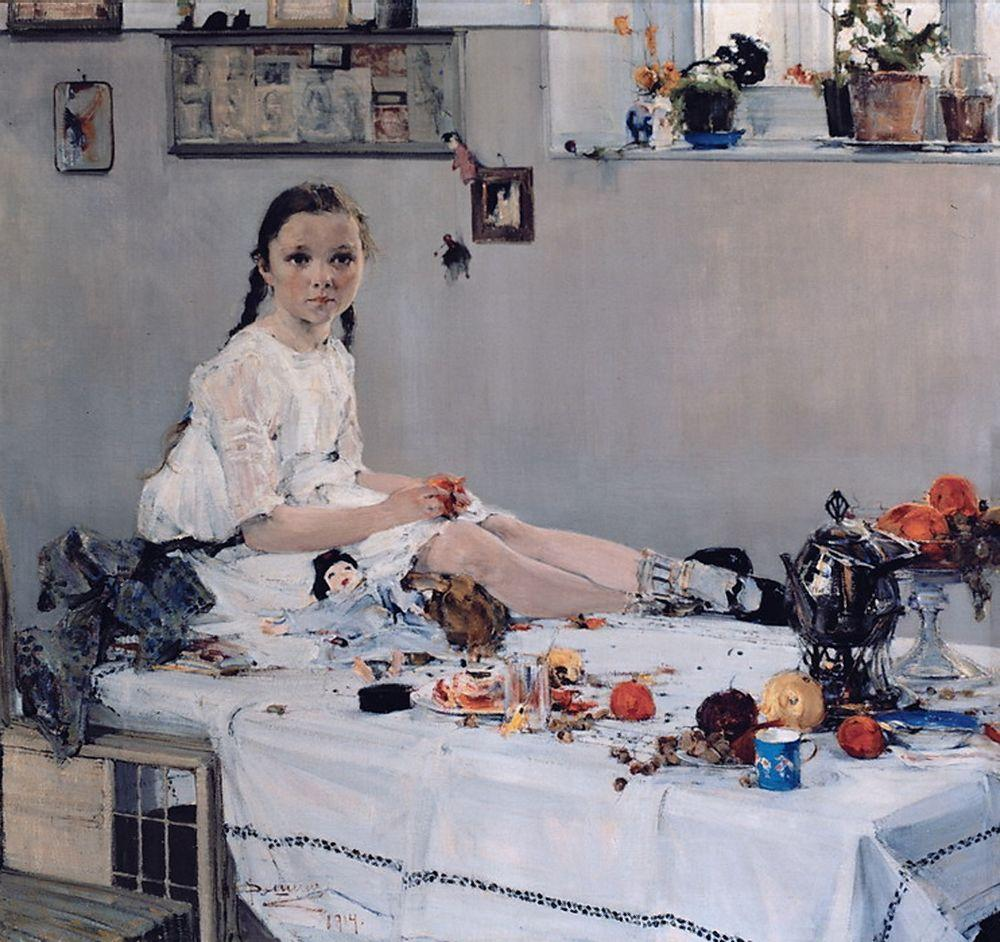
- Artist: Nicolai Fechin
- Year: 1914
- Medium: Oil on canvas
- Dimensions: 135 cm × 145 cm (53 in × 57 in)
- Location: State Museum of Fine Arts of the Republic of Tatarstan, Kazan

Portrait of Varya Adoratskaya (in Russian: Портрет Вари Адоратской) is a painting created by Nicolai Fechin in the spring of 1914 in Kazan, in the studio of his student Nadezhda Sapozhnikova. The painting belongs to the collection of the State Museum of Fine Arts of the Republic of Tatarstan in Kazan and is displayed in the permanent exhibition of the Nicolai Fechin Hall in the National Art Gallery Khazine. Art historian A. E. Kuznetsov, in an article about the painting's exhibition at the Moscow gallery Art-Divage, called the canvas one of the most brilliant children's portraits in the history of not only of Russian but also of world art.

The painting belongs to the most significant period – 1914 to 1918 – of Fechin's work, according to G. P. Tuluzakova. During this time, Fechin, choosing the form of interior portraiture, sought to create a generalized, multifaceted image that would synthesize the model's psychological characteristics with her momentary mood or state. Tuluzakova calls Portrait of Varya Adoratskaya "the most complete and perfect form of the image of childhood in Fechin's work". She considers the painting one of the artist's most harmonious creations, clear in thought and construction, and a visiting card of his Russian period.

== Children in Nicolai Fechin's work ==
Among Nicolai Fechin's most valued and often invited models were children. In her book on Fechin's work, Galina Tuluzakova contrasts the artist's genre compositions – where he depicted the complexity and contradictions of human nature, far from the ideal qualities inherent in people by nature – with his portraits of children, which, in her words, manifest "his romantic, sublime faith in humanity". In his portraits, Fechin does not distinguish between children from "simple" and "intelligent" families; both groups, in his paintings, epitomize the bright image of childhood. In the works Portrait of a Girl (Vyatka Art Museum named after V. M. and A. M. Vasnetsov), Girl in a Pink Scarf (which was for a long time in the private collection of surgeon-oncologist Academician N. N. Blokhin), Peasant Girl (private collection, USA), Girl (Panhandle-Plains Historical Museum, USA), and Katyenka (State Museum of Fine Arts of the Republic of Tatarstan), the viewer can easily determine that the characters belong to the lower social classes. In the painting Kisa and the portraits of Nina Belkovich and Misha Bardukov, the children are from a different social group, but the artist's attitude toward his subjects does not change.

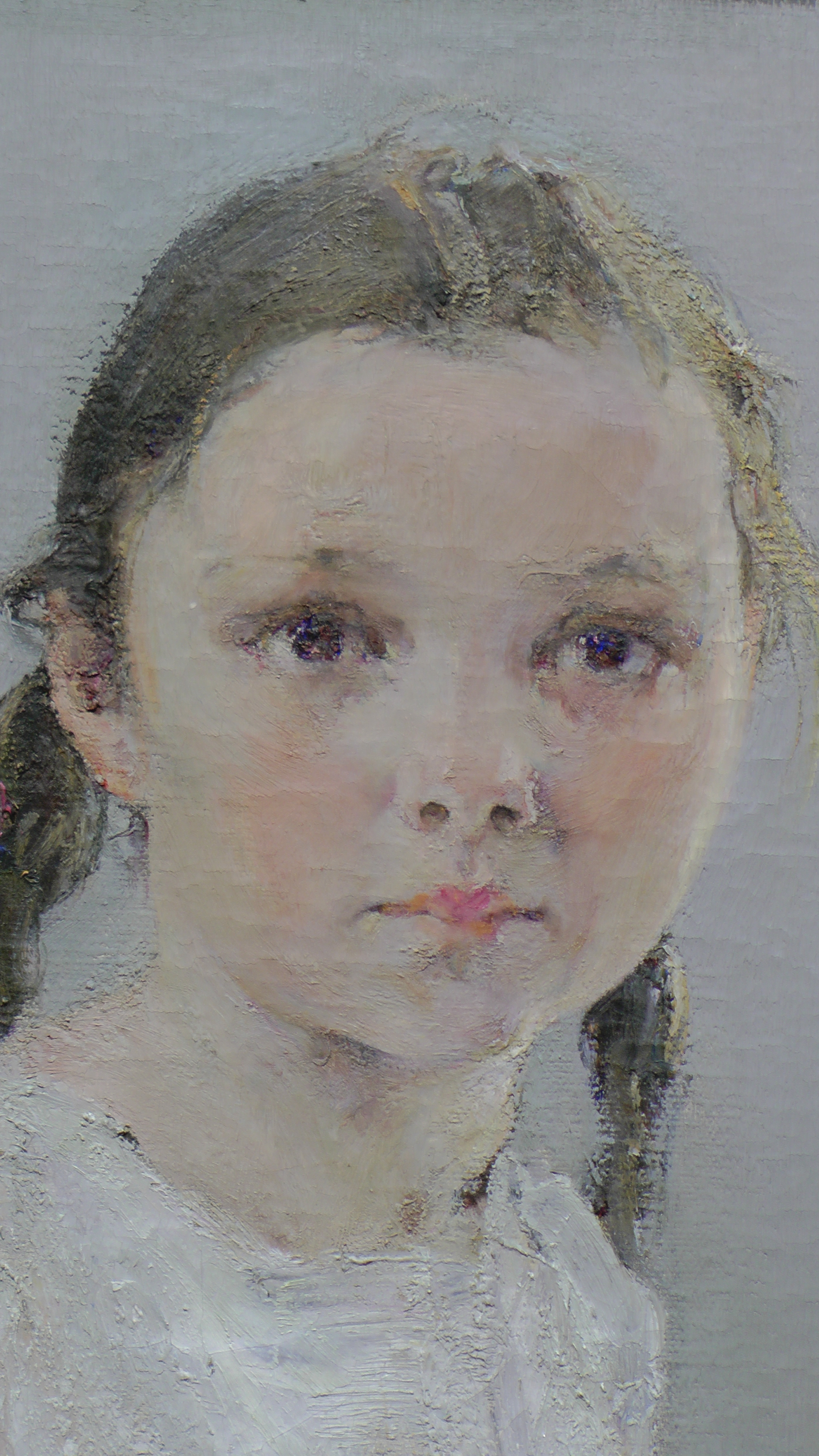
Portrait of Varya Adoratsky. Fragment

In his images of children, Fechin emphasizes their openness to the world, vulnerability, and inner purity. At the same time, he approaches childhood seriously – there is no sense of pity in his depictions. Fechin presents children in his paintings according to their age characteristics, capturing the plasticity of their movements, the tenderness of not-yet-fully-formed facial features, their liveliness, restlessness, and occasional spoiling. His portraits are often marked by a contrast in brushstrokes – delicate touches for the face and thicker, more textured strokes for clothing and backgrounds – which is especially noticeable in his portraits of children.

== Description ==
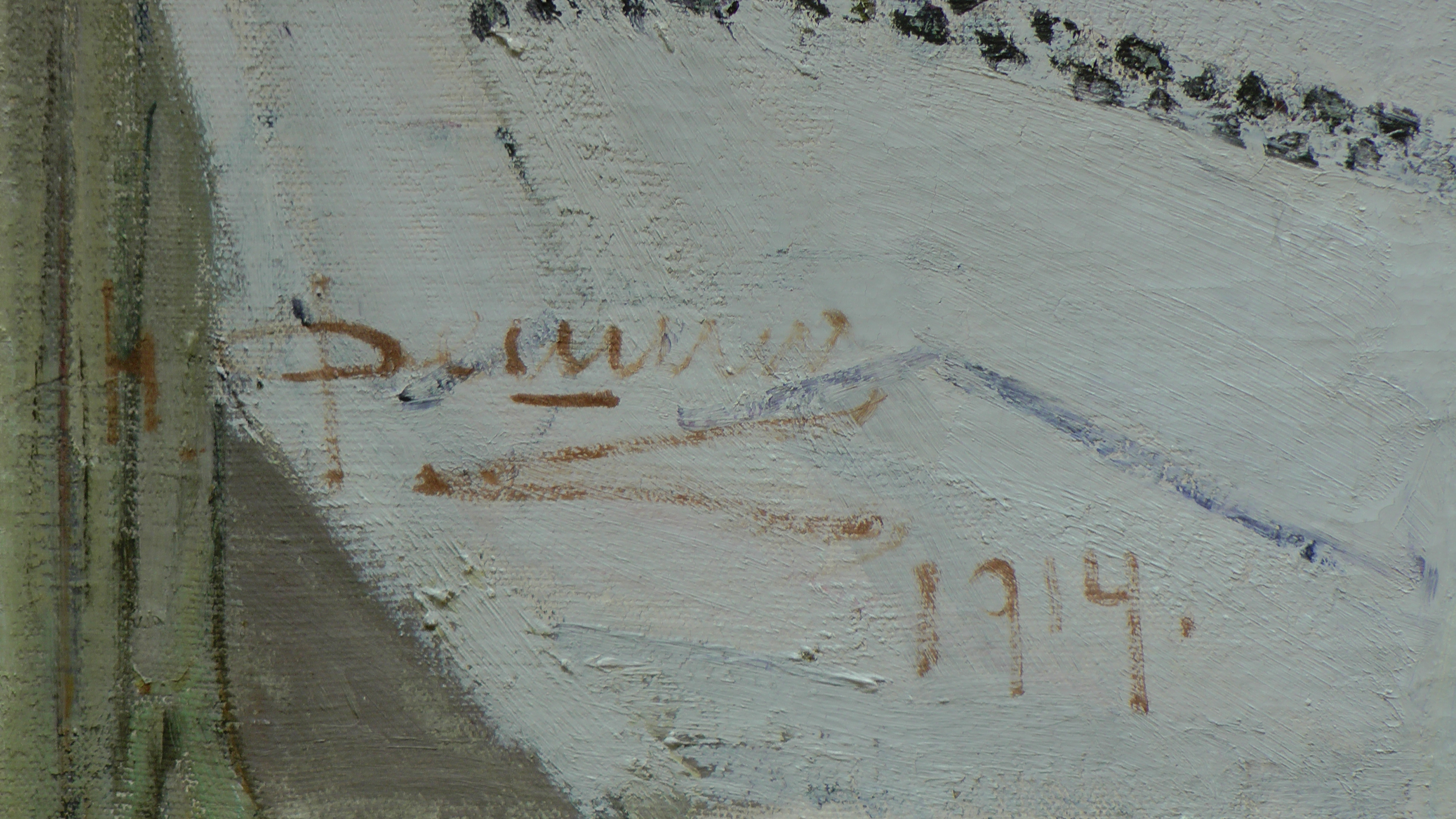
Portrait of Varya Adoratsky. Fragment with artist's signature

Portrait of Varya Adoratskaya is an oil painting on canvas. The canvas size is 135 × 145 cm (although the exhibition catalog from the Moscow gallery "Art-Divage" lists other dimensions: 138 × 147.2 cm). At the bottom left are the artist's signature and the date of the painting: N. Fechin 1914. The painting is part of the collection of the State Museum of Fine Arts of the Republic of Tatarstan in Kazan. The inventory number of the canvas in the collection is Zh-938. Since 2005, Portrait of Varya Adoratskaya has been exhibited in the Nicolai Fechin Hall on the third floor of the permanent exhibition at the National Art Gallery Khazine.

The portrait depicts a ten-year-old girl sitting on a table among toys and sweets scattered in a picturesque mess. Art historians at the State Russian Museum noted that she "would look like a toy come to life, if it were not for the serious look of a teenager growing up in a non-childish world". The painting continues the tradition of children's imagery, part of which includes Lewis Carroll's Alice (1865) and Vera Mamontova in Valentin Serov's The Girl with Peaches (1887), both of which convey "the happy, carefree nature of childhood".

The girl's face is depicted in the same color tone as the background but stands out with the more vibrant colors of her hair and eyes. She gazes at the viewer, with the artist placing the main emphasis on the "inquisitive eyes of the child". Fechin portrayed two distinct levels of still life in the painting: fruit on the table and flowers by the window. The background is a gray, monochromatic wall, creating a contrast between flatness and volume. Tuluzakova noted the unity between the figure and the surrounding "accessories" in the painting.

== Varvara Adoratskaya, the model ==
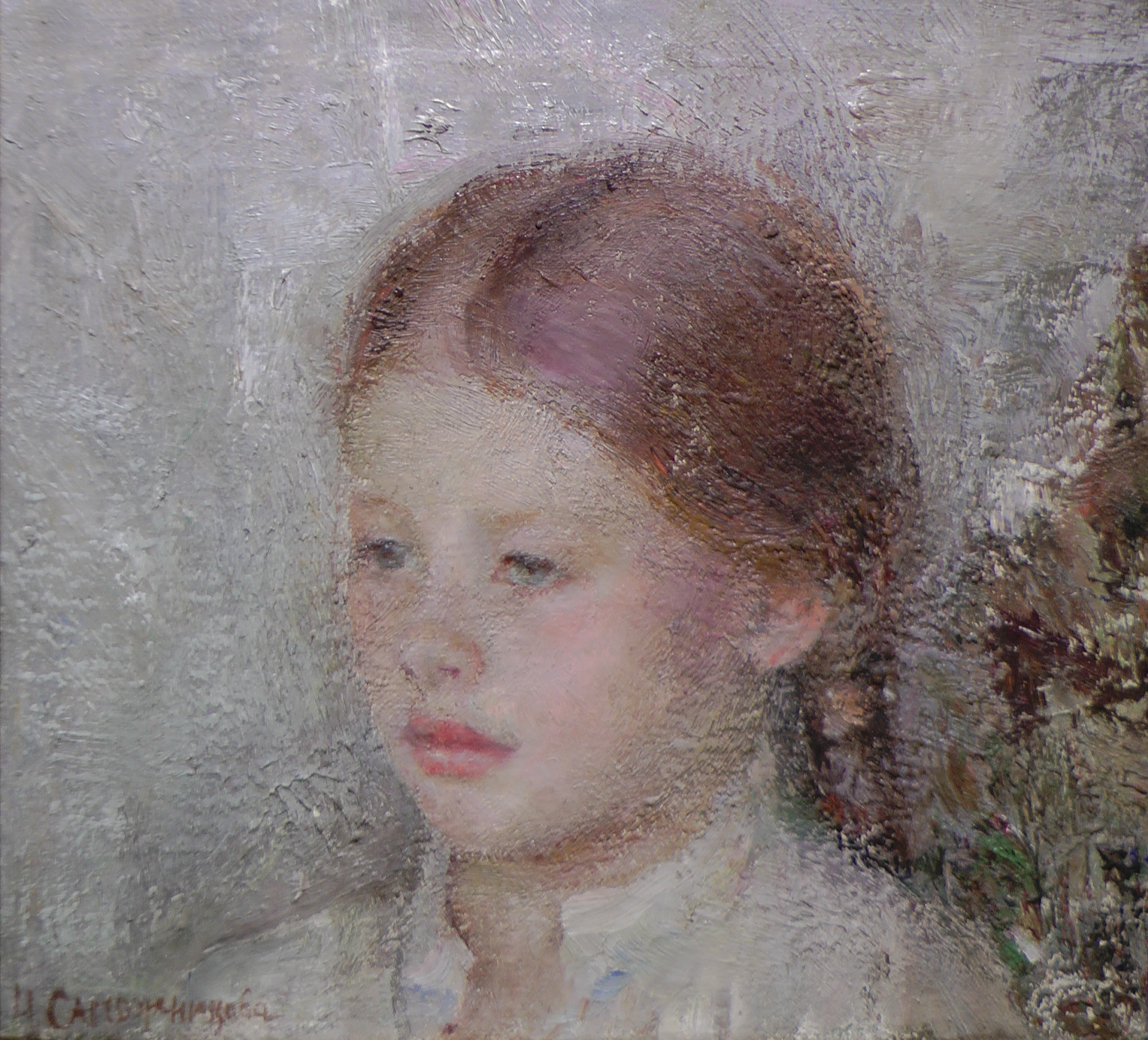
Nadezhda Sapozhnikova. Portrait of a Girl. Varya Adoratskaya (1910, State Museum of Fine Arts of the Republic of Tatarstan, canvas, oil)

Varvara Vladimirovna Adoratskaya was born in Kazan in 1904. A year later, her father was arrested for revolutionary activities and was first imprisoned, then exiled from the Russian Empire (though the Adoratsky family returned to their homeland briefly in 1907, when a family photo was taken in S. Felzer's studio in Kazan). Varvara and her mother followed her father into exile. The family lived in Switzerland and later in Germany. After the outbreak of World War I in 1914, Varvara and her parents were interned. In 1918, following an exchange proposed by Lenin, the Adoratskys returned to Russia. The family settled in Moscow, where Vladimir Adoratsky began working in the Central State Archive, and Varvara studied at Vkhutemas from 1923 to 1925. The Adoratsky family lived in an apartment in the Government House (also known as the "House on the Embankment"). Varvara's mother was disabled from a young age, having lost her hearing and eyesight, and was barely able to move, so her daughter had to devote herself to caring for her. In her youth, Varvara herself suffered from tuberculosis and Graves' disease, which is presumably what prevented her from completing her university studies.

Varvara was fluent in several languages and worked as a translator at the Marx–Engels–Lenin Institute. She assisted her father with his scientific work, translating for him, typing, and working under his supervision on translations for the Institute (which was renamed from the Marx and Engels Institute after its merger with the Lenin Institute), where her father served as director from 1931 to 1939. After his death, she continued to work at the Institute under contract. Years later, Adoratskaya sought to learn about the fate of Nicolai Fechin, who had emigrated to the United States, through the intermediary of her friends (see V. V. Adoratskaya's letter to N. N. Livanova dated October 20, 1955, in the personal archive of N. M. Valeev). Varvara Adoratskaya died in 1963.

== Creation ==
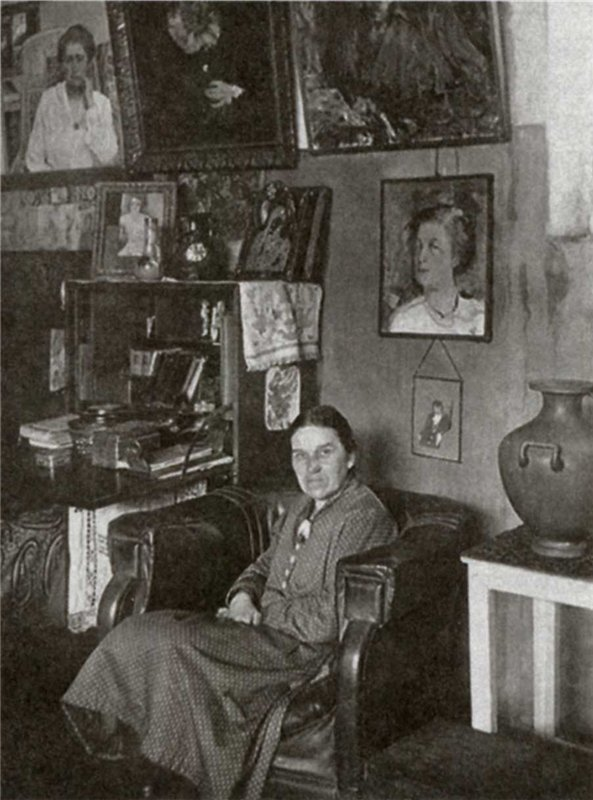
N. M. Sapozhnikova in her studio. Portrait of Adoratskaya made by Fechin appears in the center above. It was taken before 1917

From 1912, Fechin participated in exhibitions of the Society for Travelling Art Exhibitions. Along with realistic portraits by Ilya Repin, Fechin himself, and Sergey Malyutin, salon works were also presented at this time. Fechin passionately painted portraits en plein air. Usually, they were small portraits of the étude type, created in bright sunlight, often against the light. This lighting created a barely noticeable shimmering glow around the subject’s head. Even then, Repin had a high opinion of the work of his former pupil. Later, in 1926, in a conversation with Soviet artists, Repin named Nicolai Fechin among the most interesting contemporary portraitists.

When choosing models, Fechin favored a narrow circle of relatives and close friends. This allowed him to achieve in the portrait “penetrating depth and rare psychological expressiveness". his works possessed "not only external resemblance to the sitter, but also unsurpassed personal characteristics of the people to whom he felt special feelings and affection”. Such is the Portrait of Varya Adoratskaya, the daughter of friends of Fechin's family.

The father of the young model, artist V. V. Adoratsky – an active participant in the revolutionary movement, a member of the RSDLP since 1904, and later a Marxist philosopher and historian – highly appreciated Fechin's paintings and ranked him "no lower than V. Serov". However, Adoratsky did not approve of the fact that the artist often depicted sitters in "contrived poses". According to the memories of V. V. Adoratskaya, the portrait was painted in the Kazan studio of N. V. Sapozhnikova, M. Sapozhnikova – her aunt – in the spring of 1916. Fechin not only frequently visited the studio but also actively participated in its decoration in the Russian style. N. M. Sapozhnikova played an important role in Fechin's life. As his student and having significant material resources from her wealthy family, she acted as a patron of the arts in relation to the artist. Her studio was one of the artistic centers of Kazan. G. P. Tuluzakova noted in Sapozhnikova’s personality the "contrast inherent in a woman's ability to subtly understand and feel the beautiful and at the same time [possess] a male mind and energetic character".

In Sapozhnikova's studio (which was attached to the Trade House of M. F. Sapozhnikov, on Kremlin Street, a building later used as the Main Post Office), artists often gathered. They not only drew but also discussed art – painters, color, primers, and thinners. According to the memories of K. K. Chebotaryov, Fechin did not like to talk much at such meetings but listened attentively to the participants, occasionally inserting short remarks that "aptly and clearly defined his attitude to the subject of the conversation". One of the discussions was about the so-called "flat" background in portraiture. Sapozhnikova, a student of both Fechin and Kees van Dongen, often applied van Dongen’s techniques in her works. During the conversation, Fechin expressed doubts about the appropriateness of these techniques, finding van Dongen's manner conventional. Later, when creating the Portrait of Varya Adoratskaya, he himself used a flat, "painted" gray wall, but it appeared "not conventional, but realistically justified".

Many years later, the artist's young model said that the story of the painting began in March–April 1914 in Kazan. Varya Adoratskaya was very close to her aunt, Nadezhda, and often visited her studio. Sapozhnikova offered the girl the chance to become a model for Nicolai Fechin. Adoratskaya recounted (with the style and orthography of the original retained):

...At that time, Fechin conceived the idea of painting a table covered with a white tablecloth, and near the table, a girl in a shirt who has just gotten out of bed and feeds a doll from a spoon...My aunt suggested that Nicolai Ivanovich paint me. I was nine years old then, and I was quite shy and wild. When Aunt Nadia told me that I would have to pose in just a shirt, I categorically refused and said that I never feed a doll from a spoon, because: 'she can't eat.' We compromised on the fact that I would wear a white cambric dress, and the doll would lie next to me. These negotiations took place, of course, without Nicolai Ivanovich. At first, he put me in a wicker chair near the table, but then he decided to place me on the table. I didn't like it very much because it was very uncomfortable and even painful to sit there; my legs were constantly numb. But it was impossible to argue with N. I., and I had to submit. At first, I wore a wide belt with blue, yellow, and red spots. But N. I. didn't like it, and he found a piece of matte silk cloth in paler colors and repainted what he had originally done. He did the same with the dress of the Japanese doll that lay beside me. She was wearing a brightly colored dress with red, yellow, and blue flowers. At N. I.'s request, she wore another one, a bluish one, and he remodeled it in the painting.

Adoratskaya recalled that Fechin first made a sketch of the entire composition on the canvas in charcoal, then painted the face, and only outlined the other elements of the composition. Later, after finishing the work on the face, he gradually completed the whole picture. Varvara Adoratskaya recalled: "He would put a stroke and run away to look from afar, then again take paint on the brush and return to the canvas. His movements were impetuous; he worked with great temperament and enthusiasm". The young sitter attended sessions for more than a month, three times a week. Fechin continued to work on the still life part of the portrait without the girl.

== The painting in the museum's collection ==
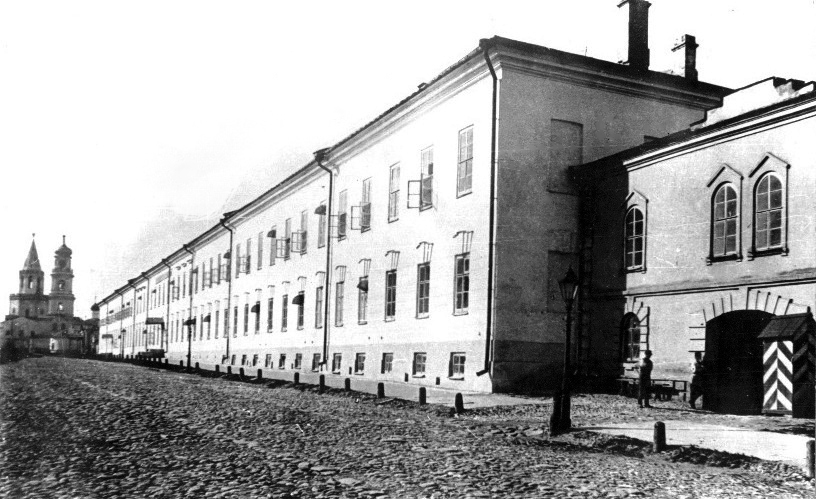
The building of the Kazan Infantry Junker School (in the rebuilt building in the 21st century is located the National Art Gallery Khazine, where the painting is exhibited). Old photo

Fechin offered the girl's portrait to Varya's father, Vladimir Adoratsky, but he refused to buy it. It was therefore acquired by N. M. Sapozhnikova. She bequeathed the portrait to her niece, Varya Adoratskaya, who had served as its model. The portrait was transferred to the State Museum of Fine Arts in 1964 by Sergei Nikolayevich Razumov. In Moscow, Razumov, a close friend of V. V. Adoratskaya, inherited Nicolai Fechin's collection of paintings after her death in 1963 and possessed a large collection of the artist's works. Along with Portrait of Varya Adoratskaya, it included many other significant pieces, such as portraits of S. M. Adoratskaya (1910), the portrait of Misha Bardukov (1914), portraits of N. M. Sapozhnikova (two études from 1915 and two large-format portraits from 1916), and the portrait of E. M. Konurina (1917).

The preparation for Nicolai Fechin's personal exhibition in Kazan in 1963 required active research and search efforts. A circle of people who might have kept his works was identified. The staff of the Kazan museum arrived in Moscow in early 1963 and met Varvara Adoratskaya. Knowing about her terminal illness, she agreed to sell the collection to the Kazan museum, but she wanted to see her own portrait in the Tretyakov Gallery, not in the Kazan museum. After Adoratskaya's death and the transfer of her collection to S. N. Razumov, negotiations had to begin anew. In the end, he agreed to the proposal to sell Fechin's works to the Kazan Museum. This applied to all works in the collection, except for the Portrait of Varya Adoratskaya, which he intended to transfer to the State Tretyakov Gallery in accordance with the wishes of the deceased. However, under the influence of persistent persuasion from the Kazan Museum, he ultimately agreed to transfer the painting to it. The transfer took place in 1964.

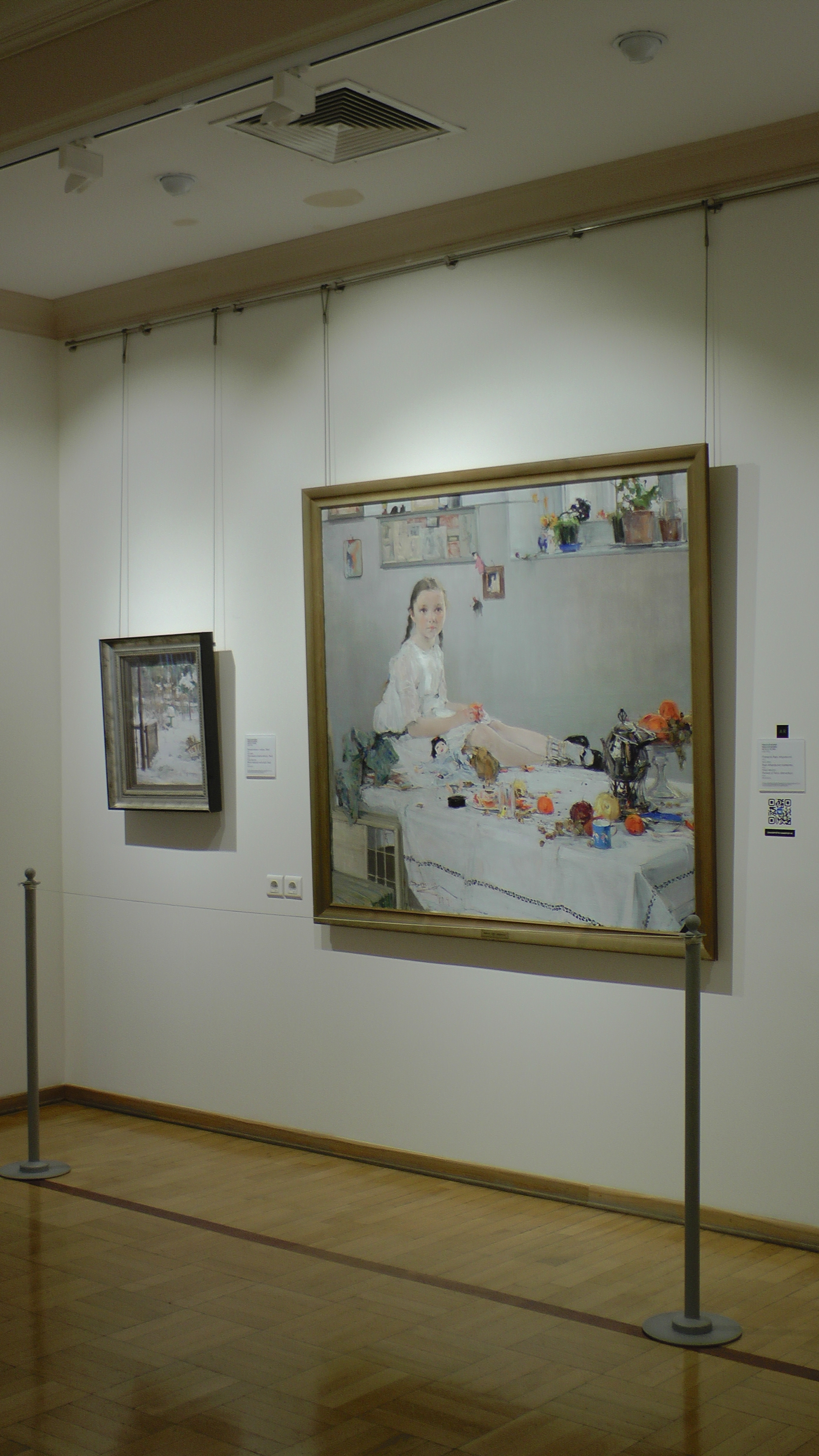
Portrait of Varya Adoratskaya in the Nicolai Fechin Hall of the National Art Gallery Khazine

The painting has repeatedly represented Fechin's work at major national and international exhibitions. Among them were the 43rd exhibition of the Society for Traveling Art Exhibitions in 1915, as well as the exposition From Kazan to Taos, held from November 2011 to February 2012 at the National Art Gallery of the State Museum of Fine Arts of the Republic of Tatarstan. As part of the 2011–2012 exposition, the exhibition Fechin, Varya, and I, prepared by the family studio of the State Museum of Fine Arts of the RT, was held. For this exhibition, a group of children created their own version of the painting Portrait of Varya Adoratskaya. Under the guidance of M. S. Obshivalkina, head of the museum pedagogy section, the children also conducted a photo session based on the painting by Nicolai Fechin, and the pictures from this session became part of the exhibition. In addition, the painting was presented at an exhibition dedicated to the work of Nicolai Fechin, first held in Kazan in 1963 and then in Moscow in 1964, as well as at an exhibition in 1992, in 2004 at the Art-Divage Gallery (Moscow), and in Kazan at an exhibition in 2006–2007, and at the Tretyakov Gallery in Moscow in 2021. The canvas was restored in 1973 at the I. E. Grabar All-Russian Art Research and Restoration Center.

Nicolai Fechin's painting is a large-format compositional portrait painting. Portrait painting, in Tuluzakova's understanding, is a work originally conceived by Fechin as a kind of generalization. Such a portrait synthesizes the individual characteristics of the model while also aiming to create a typical and, at the same time, ideal image of the man of his time.

== Critical and public reception ==
=== Contemporaries about the painting ===
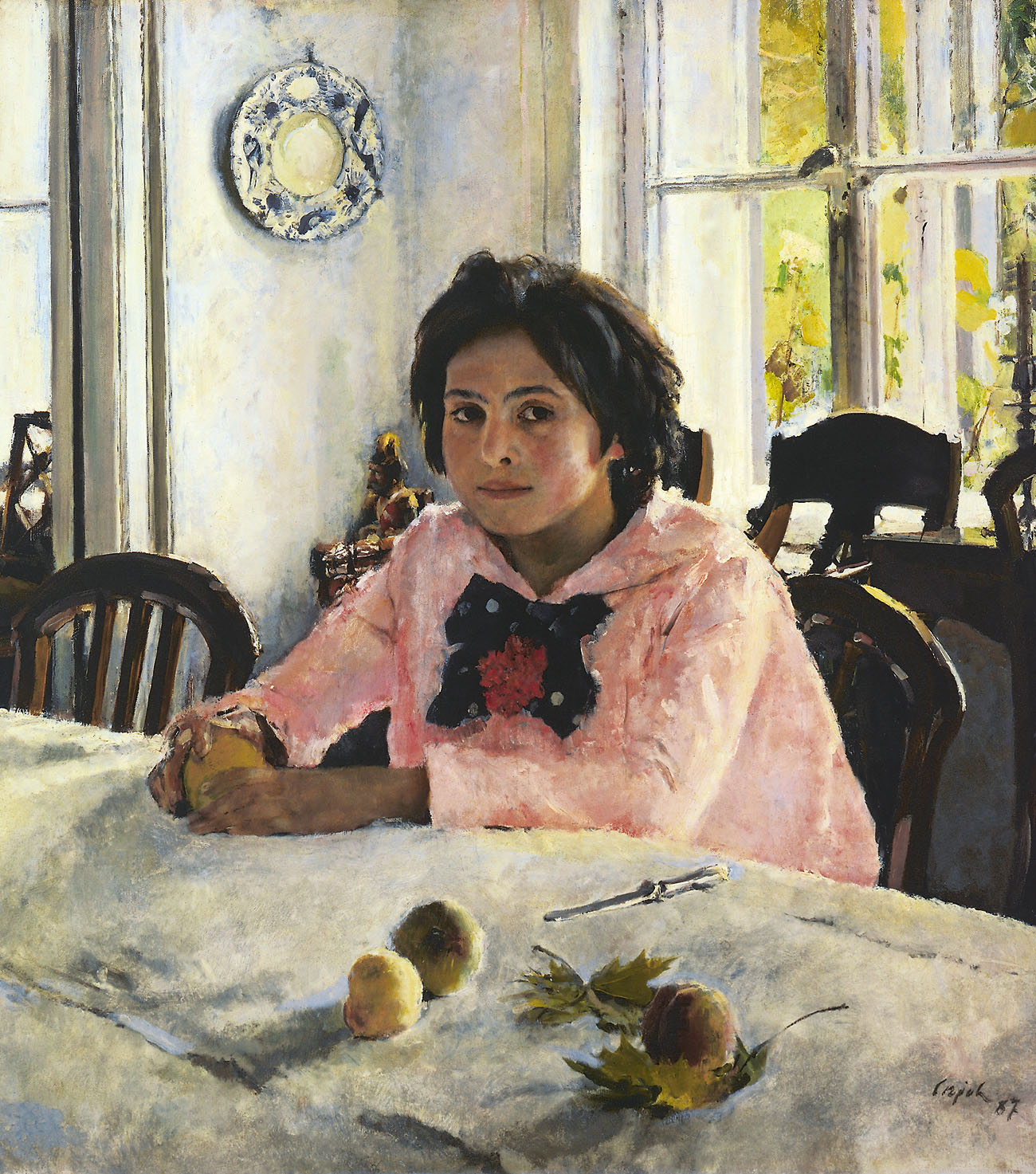
Valentin Serov, Girl with Peaches

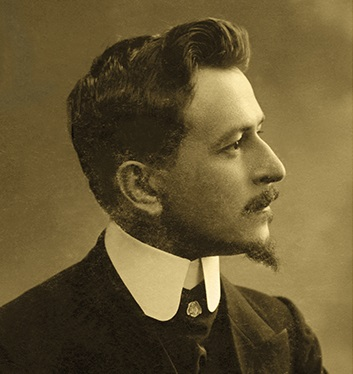
Pyotr Maksimilianovich Dulsky, the author of the first biography of Nicolai Fechin

The painting was first presented to a wide audience in the year of its creation at a periodic exhibition of the Kazan Art School. Art historian P. E. Kornilov recalled that his acquaintance with the work of Fechin took place at this very exhibition, held in the building of the art school. Kornilov's attention was drawn to Portrait of Varya Adoratskaya, although the exhibition showed other significant works by the artist, including Bondarka and Portrait of His Wife. In the portrait of V. Adoratskaya, he liked the simplicity and clarity of the composition, the very “image of a pretty girl”, the still life on the table, and the noble grayish-nacre colors dominating the picture. The painting evoked in Kornilov's memory the works of Valentin Serov. Journalist Vl. Denkov, in an article in 1915, even claimed: “...for the portrait of Varya Adoratskaya undoubtedly served as a model Serov's same V. Mamontova (Girl with Peaches) – fruit on the tablecloth, swarthy face, gray wall, and a piece of window”.

Sixty years later, A. A. Lyubimov, a painter and teacher, a disciple of Nicolai Fechin, who visited the same exhibition, remembered:

I remember in 1914, at the periodical exhibition of the school, a very strong impression was made on me by a portrait of the Adoratskaya girl sitting on a table amidst a still life. What freshness, what power, and at the same time, what delicate restraint and what a high general culture of portrait painting! It is impossible to forget, to pass by this masterpiece of Fechin's painting. There were a lot of people crowded, everyone wanted to take a closer look at the cuisine of painting and the technique of execution of this marvelous portrait.

In the first monograph on the work of Nicolai Fechin, published in 1921 in Kazan, art historian Peter Dulsky wrote about the painting Portrait of Varya Adoratskaya:

This very beautiful piece, almost the best of all executed by N. Fechin, depicts a full-length portrait of a girl, composed on the left side of the picture. The model is depicted in a rather calm pose, seated on the corner of the table. The smooth, gray tone of the background serves as a beautiful frame for the portrait, colorful still life, depicting a metal coffee pot, (Note: Other researchers consider that the artist depicted a tea pot. For example, Kaplanov mentions it in: Kaplanova, S. G. (1975). "Творческий путь Н. И. Фешина". Николай Иванович Фешин. Документы, письма, воспоминания о художнике: сб. / Сост. и автор комментариев Г. Могильникова [Nicolai Ivanovich Fechin. Documents, letters, memoirs about the artist: collection] (in Russian). Л.: Художник РСФСР. p. 14.) a vase with oranges and grapes, and a blue porcelain cup, all executed with great taste and skill; the portrait itself is surprisingly soft, with pleasant tones, well in harmony with the whole environment, as a whole giving a slender artistic impression.

=== Soviet art historians' opinions ===
Art historian Vladimir Voronov wrote about the “purest pearlescent painting, completed realistic form” of the painting. By “soft, exquisite harmony,” he put the portrait of Varya Adoratskaya on a par with Ilya Repin's Dragonfly and Valentin Serov's Girl with Peaches.

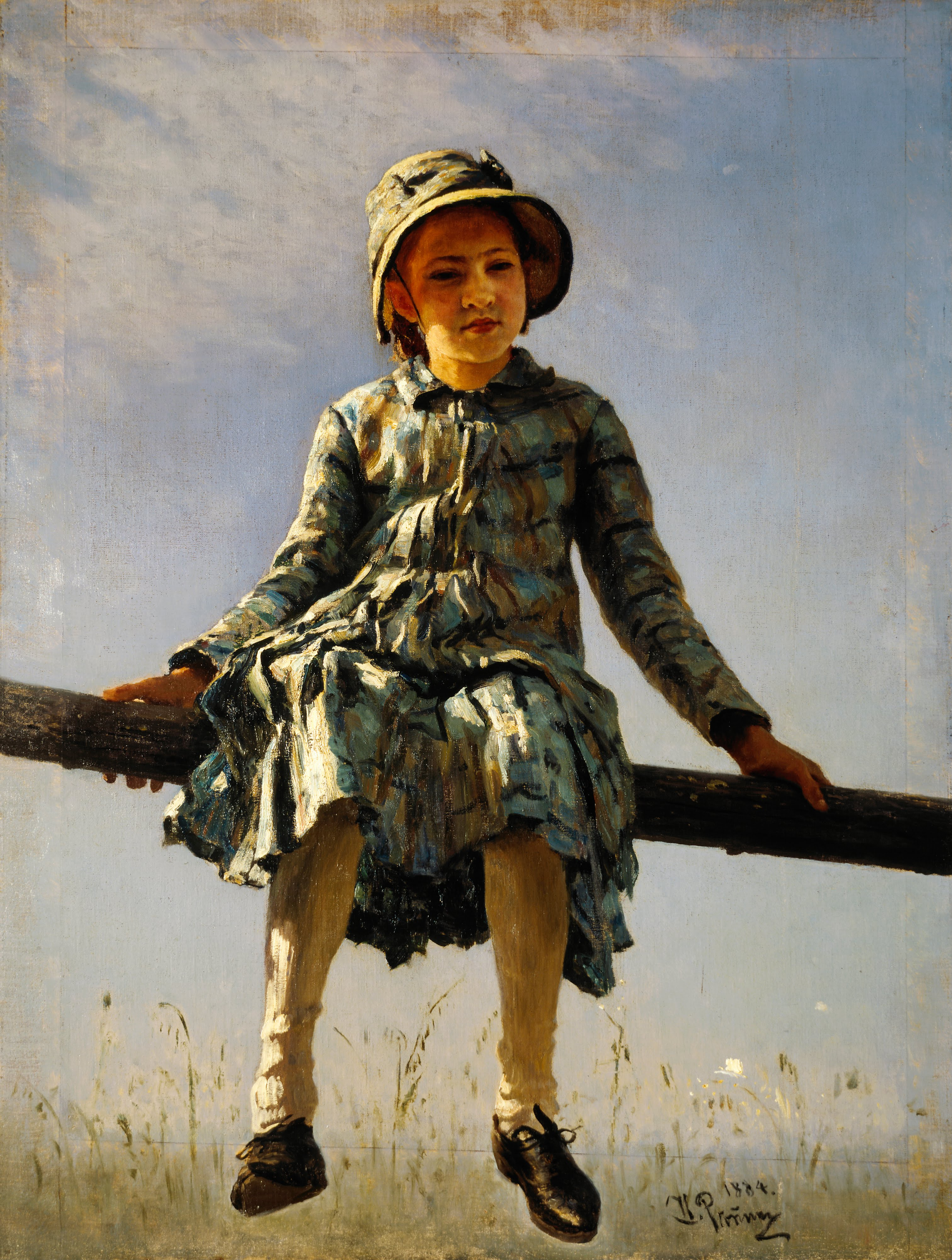
Ilya Repin. Dragonfly. Painter's daughter portrait, 1884

An art historian who specialized in painting of the Silver Age, S. G. Kaplanova noted the seriousness and soulful softness of the image of the girl, which the artist painted “as if suddenly”. The girl's eyes are thoughtful, attentive and clear, golden-blonde hair is arranged in pigtails, peculiar fit flexible figure. Kaplanova described the color scheme of the canvas as gentle, joyful and at the same time refined. She emphasized the artist's skill in depicting a white tablecloth, a white cambric dress and a bluish-green bow. Kaplanova called the still life in the painting “beautifully painted,” and it includes a teapot on an alcohol burner, oranges, pomegranates, nuts, a vase of fruit, and a doll in a blue dress. In an earlier essay on Nicolai Fechin's work, dating from 1964, Kaplanova noted the bright and joyful atmosphere of Varya Adoratskaya's portrait. She wrote about the feeling of bewilderment that arises upon acquaintance with it, caused by the unusual composition and unexpected location of the model. In her opinion, the portrait is interesting not only because of the interpretation of the girl's image, but also because of the color solution. The portrait evoked in Kaplanova's mind the best children's portraits of Russian painting of the second half of the 19th century. She noted the brown thoughtful, attentive and clear eyes of the child, a peculiar fit of the flexible figure of the girl “with a wonderful, soft on the lines, neck”.

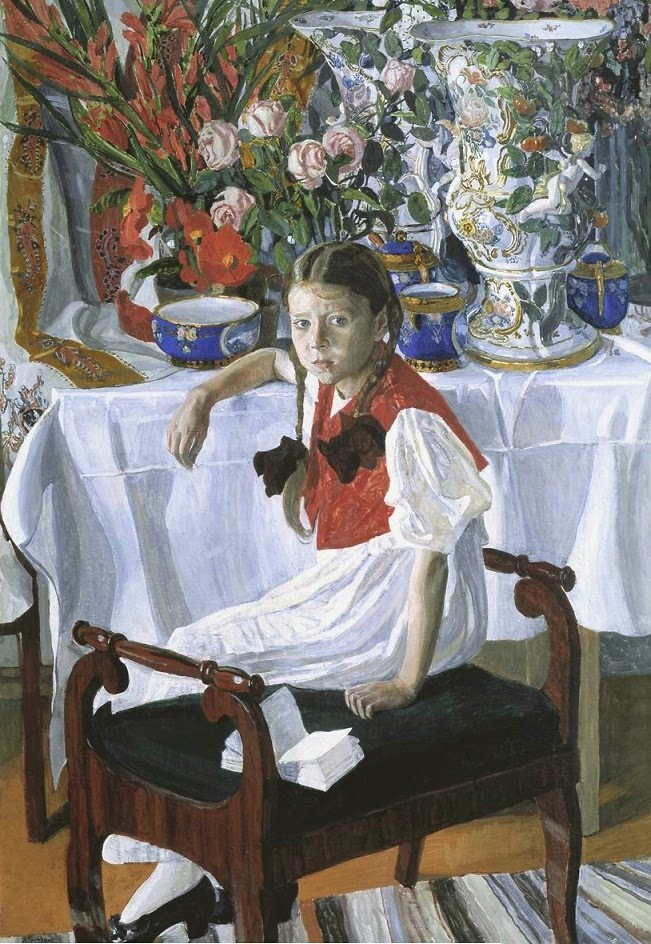
Aleksandr Golovin. Girl with Porcelain, 1916

Ida Hoffman, an art historian, compared the painting Girl with Porcelain (1916) by Aleksander Golovin and Portrait of Varya Adoratskaya by Nicolai Fechin. The common elements, she noted, were decorativeness and subject – children and a colorful still life on a table. At the same time, each artist, in her opinion, approached this subject in his own way. Fechin depicts a conventional, invented situation: a girl sitting on the table amidst a picturesque mess of untidy dishes and scattered fruit. She is the main object of the artist's attention. Things, flowers, books, and pictures on the walls – these bright spots are arranged around her figure in a light-colored dress, creating a peculiar atmosphere of the child's world. Varya's face does not show cloudless happiness; it is not childishly serious and anxious. This image, from the art historian's point of view, is close to Frosa in Golovin's painting.

Given the similarity of interpretation for his canvas, Golovin chose, from an artistic point of view, the following solution. The girl in the painting is included in the overall color composition of the canvas as one of its components. The little figure of a five-year-old girl is placed not on the table, as by Fechin, but at the table, on which rises a large mass of expensive flowers and collectible porcelain. Frosya's face appears at the level of the still life. Golovin turns the portrait into a performance, where flowers and things become actors along with the girl. He carefully selected the objects and thought over the composition (the objects are arranged according to their size, shape, and color). By placing a mirror at the back, he doubled the number of objects on the table, simultaneously increasing the impression of this mass of beautiful things.

Art historian A. B. Feinberg noted in his book Artists of Tatarstan, published in 1983, the talent of Fechin as a colorist, as applied to the painting. The artist, in his opinion, managed to create a subtle range of colors, dominated by gray-pearl tones, enlivened by bright bursts of blue, yellow, and red spots. The image of Varya itself is “spiritualized by the artist's careful attitude to the model".

=== 1990s Russian art historians on the painting ===
In the article Varenka's Homecoming, Kazan art historian and honored worker of culture of the Republic of Tatarstan, A. I. Novitsky, noted the "animal-like" nature of male faces and the "stupidity of female faces" in Nicolai Fechin's paintings. In his opinion, the artist's aestheticism prevails over psychology. Novitsky evaluated Portrait of Varya Adoratskaya as almost the only peak in Fechin's work.

The artist and art historian S. N. Voronkov wrote that the composition of the painting is built on contrasts; the harmony and calmness in the image of the girl oppose the chaos of the still life on the table (in his opinion, it could be a reflection on the events taking place in Russia at that time). The figure of the girl is depicted in detail and materiality, in contrast to the sketchy still life. The portrait is subtle in color and painting. It is characterized by “made” freshness, apparent ease of execution, and a restraint of painterly temperament not always characteristic of Fechin. Voronkov considered the compositional asymmetry of the painting characteristic of the Art Nouveau era. The balance, despite the asymmetry, is achieved by contrasts in the texture of the strokes, color and tone contrasts, and different methods, through the correlation of light and dark tones (the artist's calculated size and quantitative ratios of color spots played a role). Thanks to this, the viewer's attention is focused on the girl's face (although her head is displaced from the geometric center, and the geometric center is the orange in Varya's hands).

The turned table and the “breakthrough of the wall by the windowsill” enhance the depth of the space. In Voronkov's opinion, the artist dictated to the viewer a complex trajectory of the gaze at the canvas. The still life plays the role of the pictorial center of the painting Portrait of Varya Adoratskaya. From it, the viewer's gaze moves to the girl. The girl's blue eyes are not childishly serious; in them, the viewer feels her interest in the world. From the figure of Varya, the gaze is transferred to the miniatures and drawings on the wall, to the flowers on the windowsill, and returns to the still life (painted with painterly, saturated, pasty, textured brushstrokes, combined with delicate glaze painting in the style of the French 19th-century academician Jean-Auguste-Dominique Ingres, using the effect of glowing white canvas). According to Voronkov, within this imaginary circular movement of the gaze, there is a light gray wall (painted translucently, with a wide flute). It is not perceived as a void but expands the space and gives an “exit” from the painting. The pictorial scale is based on gradations of light colors.

The miniature in the dark frame on the wall is a stable color dominant on the vertical axis and a “bridge” between Varya's head and the windowsill, forming a diagonal line. Voronkov noted that, despite the chaotic nature of the depicted objects, “nothing can be removed or added to the painting without damaging the composition”. The artist created the composition of the portrait with the viewer's perception in mind (color and its emotional impact play a major role). If the composition were reversed, it would, in Voronkov's opinion, lose its balance and meaning. He considered the painting Portrait of Varya Adoratskaya an example of compositional and pictorial skill, based on the artist's intuition and analysis.

=== 2000s Russian art historians on the painting ===
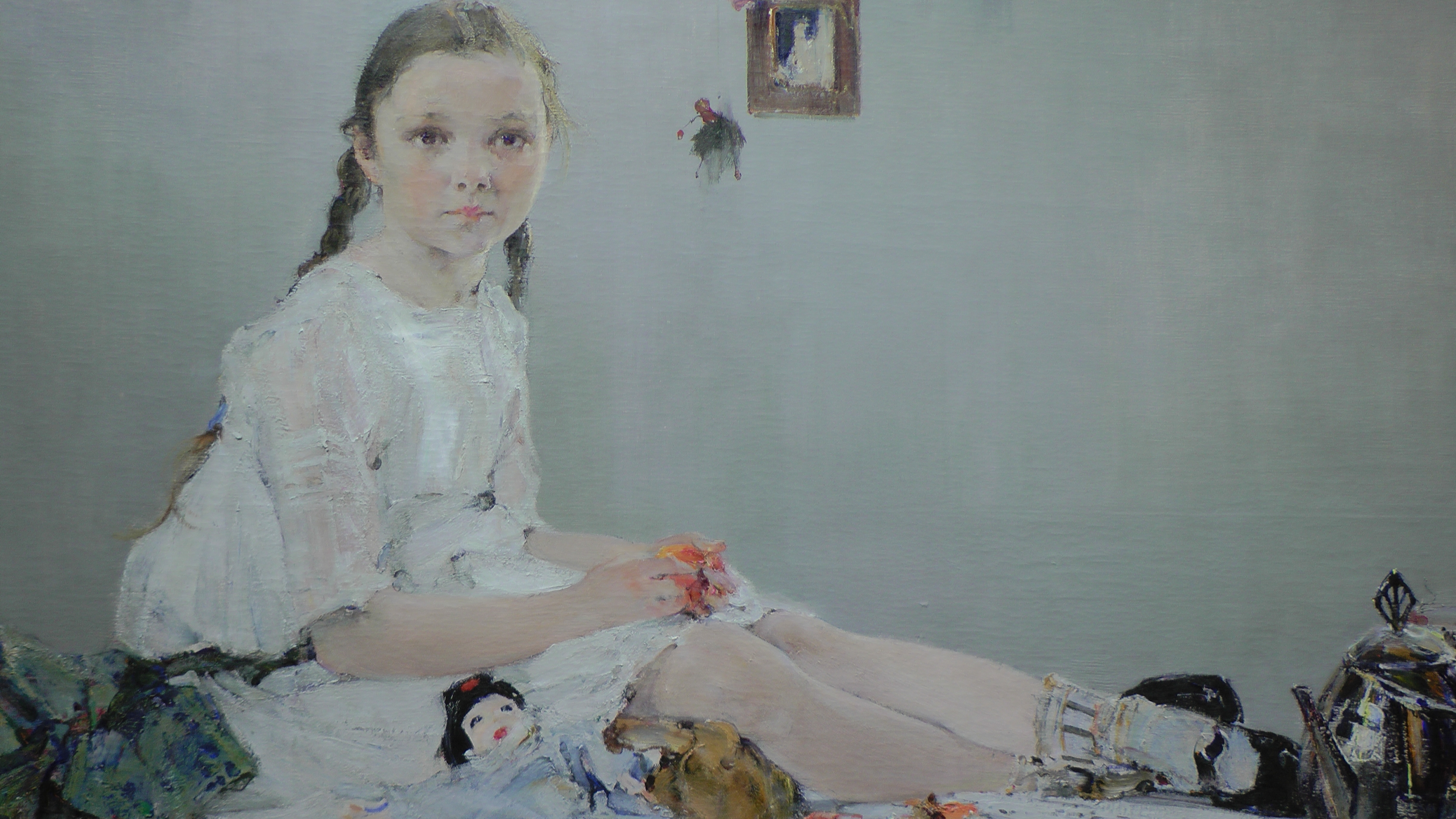
Portrait of Varya Adoratskaya, fragment (a sitting on the table girl)

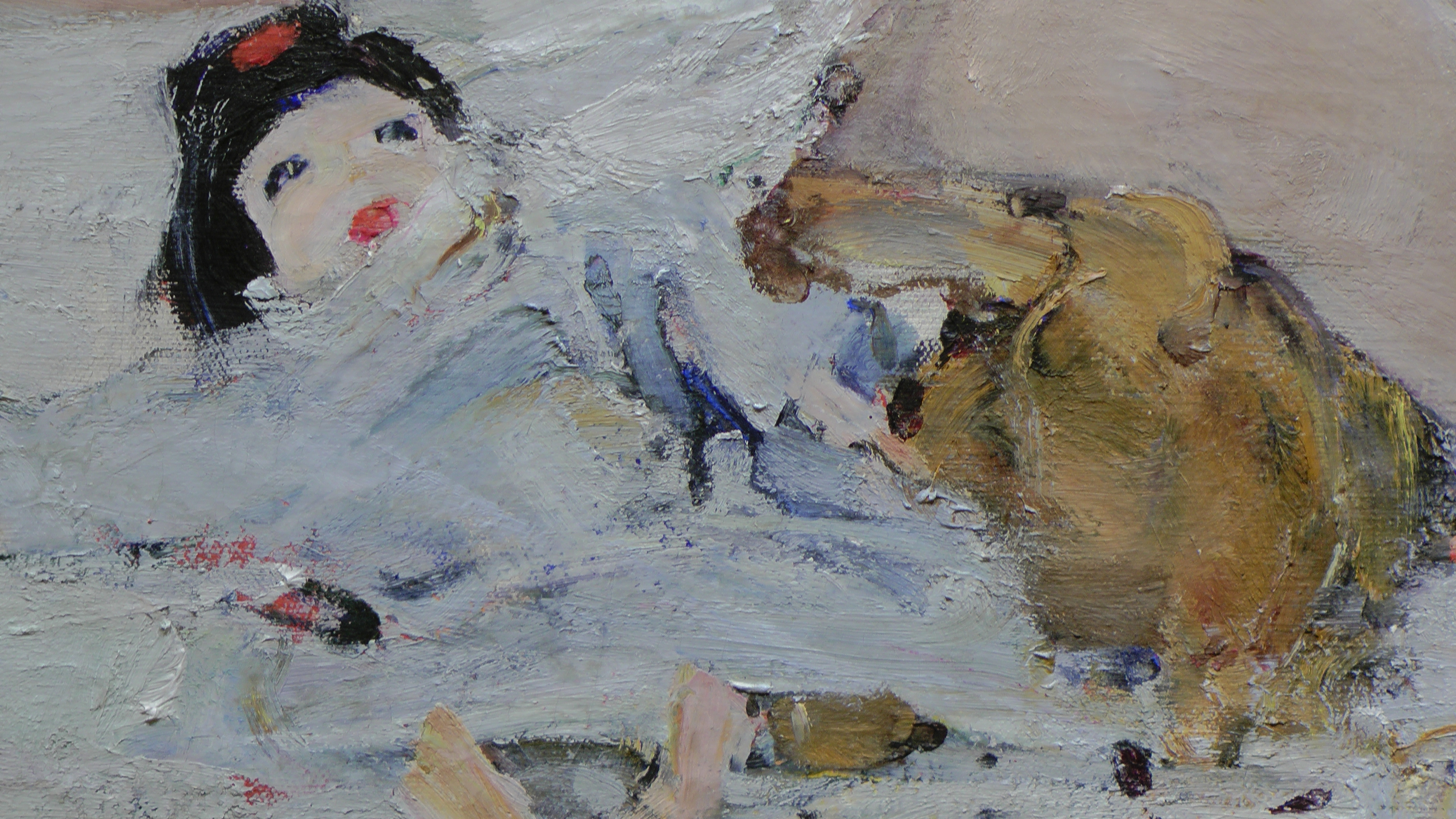
Portrait of Varya Adorotskaya, fragment (toys under the girl's knee)

Anton Uspensky noted that the painting “is polluted and flattened in reproduction; the poignancy of the emotional balance found in the painting disappears, and the silvery-gray light goes out”. Uspensky draws attention to some curious details, from his point of view:

- Varya sits almost on the edge of the table in an uncomfortable posture, with her tucked knee and upright, “pulled-back” position appearing tense.
- In the girl's hands is a certain orange fruit, “which has no name”. The artist depicted this strange fruit in a lot of his works; in different paintings, it looks like a tangerine or a persimmon, "never questioning the appearance of an orange".
- The girl sits surrounded by presents (the gift in her hands, a doll, and a book) but seems indifferent to them: she has pressed a teddy bear with her foot, and the blue mug is out of her reach.
- The artist shows the instability of the world he depicts: “The table is littered so exquisitely that one admires the honey-red rind and ultramarine peelings. The child is 'suspended' amid dangerous surroundings, the girl planted as if on a halted swing, the tablecloth blackened with mezhazhka from below, a baguette frame holding the border above her head. The spot closest to her face is a dark fluffy toy hanging on a string in the hands of its pink counterpart”. “There is restlessness in everything”, and Varya's emotions are unpredictable.
- The site of the painting is unclear: “The high window hints at the basement, the diffused light implies the attic”.

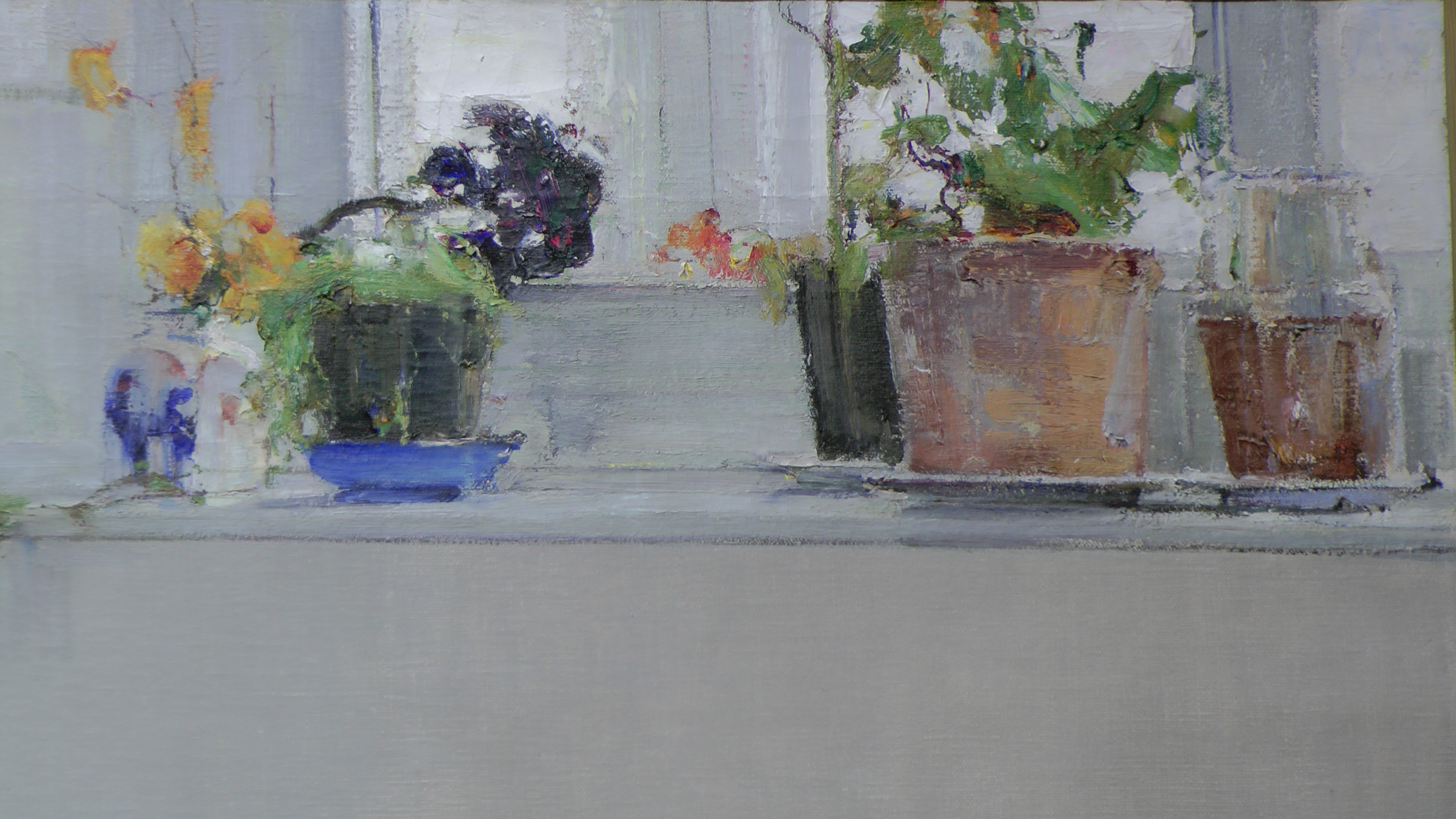
Portrait of Varya Adorotskaya, fragment (plants behind the girl's back)

D. G. Seryakov evaluated the painting as a work in the Art Nouveau style. He noted that the plane of the light gray wall emphasizes the conventionality of the visual space. The color of the portrait is restrained, based on combinations of different shades of white and gray, but the bright and juicy pots of flowers, dishes on the table, and fruit are vividly painted. The contrast with the wall background is further emphasized by the girl's dark hair, black shoes, and the metal kettle on the table. Seryakov highlights the artist's use of dark fragments made with strokes of ultramarine, where Fechin achieves an original optical effect (blending – at a distance, ultramarine merges with nearby colors into a single tone, but up close, it creates sharp contrasts). Fechin used this effect in depicting the girl's hair and brown eyes. Seryakov believes that in this painting, Fechin turns to the effect of intentional incompleteness (non-finito), but here this effect has a “more restrained sound” than in his other paintings, and “gravitates toward the natural conventionality of the pictorial manner”.

In Seryakov's opinion, when using non-finito, the general forms of the image in Portrait of Varya Adoratskaya are clearly “readable”, but upon “detailed examination of the painting, they begin to vibrate and, in some places, disintegrate into a chaotic pile of strokes”. He believes that Nicolai Fechin's painting is a vivid example of how non-finito, as a hyperbolization of the regular conventions of pictorial language (where there is invariably an artistic selection of the main from the secondary, and the expressiveness of the initial technical element – a colorful stroke – naturally lives in the overall structure of the picture), can manifest itself not only as a direct path to the growth of abstract elements in the work but also as a stylistic approach inherent in a realistic manner of depiction.

G. P. Tuluzakova wrote that, from its first appearance at exhibitions, viewers involuntarily associated Nicolai Fechin's painting with the famous painting Girl with Peaches by V. A. Serov. The two works have quite a lot in common: the subject, expressive means, and mood (an atmosphere of balance, harmony, and happiness). Tuluzakova noted that until the turn of the 19th and 20th centuries, children were not given much importance in fine arts. In Girl with Peaches by Valentin Serov and Portrait of Varya Adoratskaya by Nicolai Fechin, the authors captured the image of “the hope of a tired, sick time fraught with social catastrophes”, “a breath of clean air amidst skepticism and disappointment, a desire to find clarity amidst complexities and contradictions”.

According to Tuluzakova, Portrait of Varya Adoratskaya is not a repetition of Valentin Serov's earlier painting, but Fechin's own variation on his predecessor's theme. Fechin depicted the girl sitting on a table, making her part of an “exquisite still life”. This allows the artist to emphasize “the natural gracefulness and tenderness of the plasticity of the child's body”. He carefully describes the details of the still life, perceived as realistic in accordance with the portrait image of the girl. The situation depicted in the painting, according to Tuluzakova, is artificial, but is perceived by the viewer quite organically. Tuluzakova, along with other art historians, emphasizes that the composition of the painting is asymmetrical – the figure of the girl is displaced from the central axis of the canvas. At the same time, the heroine's face is in the optically active part of the canvas.

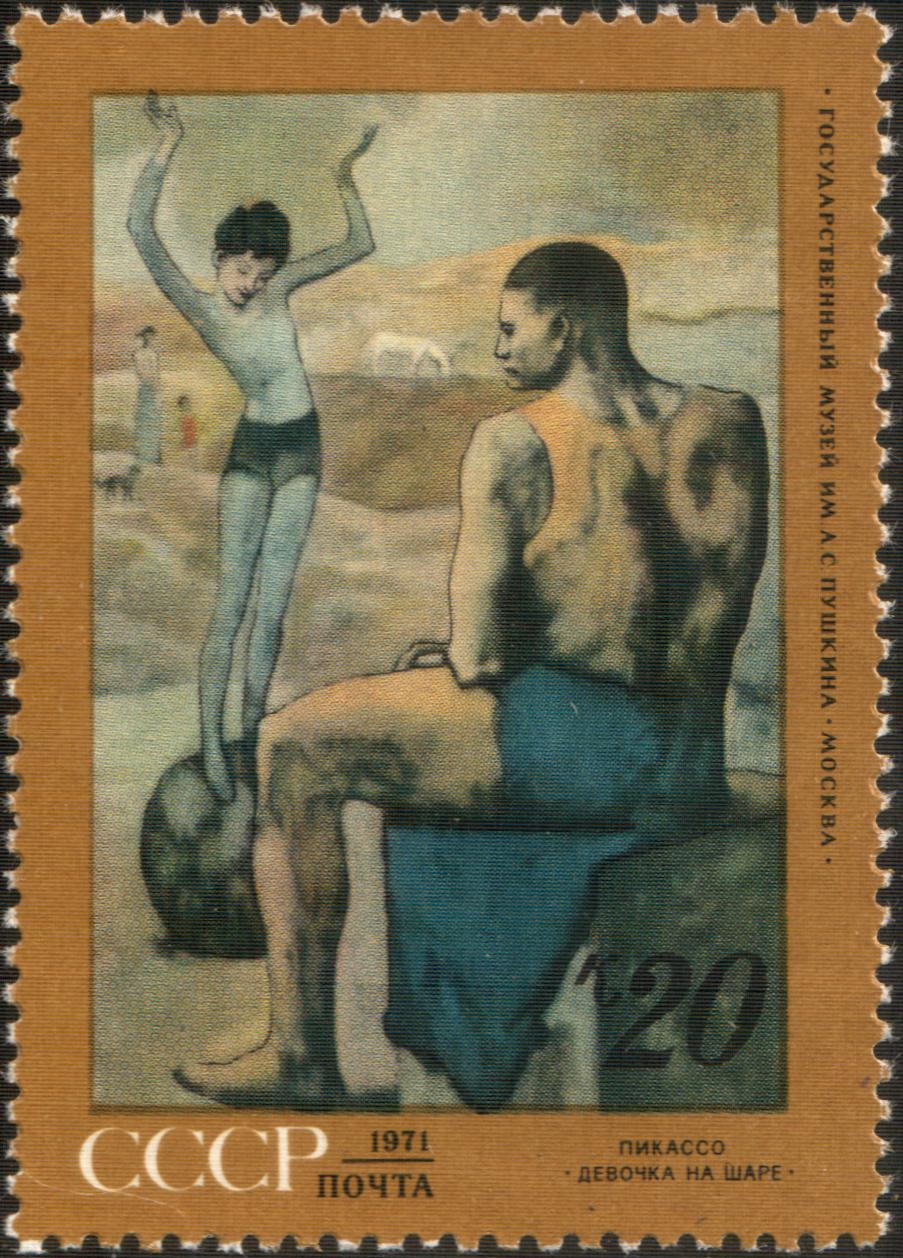
Pablo Picasso, Girl on a Ball (1905) on a 1971 Soviet stamp

Interior details, such as the window with flower pots, miniatures on the wall, dishes, and fruit on the table, carry, according to Tuluzakova, a double meaning. On the one hand, they are objects of everyday life, recreating the atmosphere of family coziness. On the other hand, these objects serve as important color and texture accents. The mood of the canvas corresponds to the calm color of the background, with various shades and shimmers of gray. Tuluzakova notes that this color in the painting “acquires the qualities of mother-of-pearl, a sense of preciousness”.

Fechin uses contrasting and intense colors: orange, yellow, and blue. The arrangement of color spots emphasizes the rhythm of the painting: the light brown (Note: Voronkov writes not about the girl's brown, but black hair in: Voronkon, S. N. (1999). К вопросу о творчестве Николая Фешина: дипломная работа, перераб. и исправл [To the question of Nikolai Feshin's work] (PDF) (in Russian). Санкт-Петербургский Академический институт живописи, скульптуры и архитектуры имени И. Е. Репина. p. 32.) hair of the girl, the orange oranges on the table and in her hands, and the orange flowers on the windowsill. The limit of cold colors in the painting is black, and the limit of warm colors is yellow. The brightest spot in the painting is the girl's dress, which acquires warmth in contrast to the cold wall.

Fechin's brushwork is restrained, but the still life displays the expressiveness characteristic of his work. Rough strokes (which give them a sense of relief and freedom) convey not only the shape of objects but also the material qualities: the silver of a teapot, the transparency of a vase, the texture of fruits. According to Galina Tuluzakova, the depiction of the glass is particularly striking – Fechin used a palette knife on still-dry paint to achieve the effect of glass, through which the fruit lying on the table shines. In the disorder of objects scattered on the table, Tuluzakova sees the ease of domesticity and the opportunity to present a memorable decorative effect. The painting is a work where the substantive and formal aspects cannot be separated.

Art critic and poet Larisa Davtyan wrote that she initially perceived the heroine of the painting as “a huge doll with a very human face,” since the girl sits in full height on the table. In her opinion, this is not just bad taste, but a dangerous challenge to the sacred representation of “the table as God's throne.” She later realized that this is not a performance of a doll (like Suok from Yury Olesha's The Three Fat Men), because the girl's expression is serious, and she looks uncomfortable on such a podium. In Varya Adoratskaya's gaze, Davtyan read the child's perplexed question to the strange adults: “Why did you put me here?” The girl sitting on the table lacks, in the critic's opinion, the inner balance that is present in the girl balancing on the ball in Pablo Picasso's Girl on a Ball.

Larisa Davtyan noted the challenge and artistic provocation in Fechin's painting, if not in the style of Picasso, then in Fechin's own manner of drawing out dissonances on a deep subconscious level, demonstrating a high level of demand on the young model, with no leniency or allowance for her age. The world of childhood is marked by elements of decoration, not by the expression of carefree innocence on the child’s face.

== Eya with Cantelope as a paraphrase of Varya Adoratskaya's portrait ==
- Nikolai Fechin. Eya with Cantelope, 1923
- Nikolai Fechin. Summer, 1924

The painting Eya with Cantaloupe (1923; long at the Forrest Fenn Gallery, Santa Fe, USA) is, according to Tuluzakova, a paraphrase of Portrait of Varya Adoratskaya. It develops the line of plein air and interior compositional portraits of Fechin and is related to the portraits from the Russian period of his work. The artist's daughter (later known as the American ballerina, art therapist, and art critic Eya Fechin) is sitting at a table. In her hands, she holds a cut muscat cantaloupe. Next to the girl, the artist has placed a still life with apples, pears, plums, a pineapple, and bunches of flowers. The fruits are painted in a brown range from black to yellow and are the first to attract the viewer's attention. The background features drapery. The figure of the girl, as in Portrait of Varya Adoratskaya, is shifted to the side, her face half-turned and her eyes downcast. The girl corresponds to a different color scheme, formed by the grayish-white background, tablecloth, dress, golden hair, and delicate skin of Eya. The contrast of color schemes reveals, according to Tuluzakova, her fragility and “almost immateriality”. At the same time, she believes that Eya's portrait is not perceived as a generalized image of childhood or the embodiment of the hope of the era, as with the portrait of Varya Adoratskaya, although its pictorial tasks are more complex.

== Bibliography ==
- Воспоминания (оригинал — Архив МИН РТ., ф.-4., оп. 1., д. 2/16-68/4) / Адоратская В. В. // К вопросу о творчестве Николая Фешина / Воронков С. Н. [Memoirs (original - Archive of the Ministry of Foreign Affairs of the Republic of Tajikistan, f.-4., op. 1., d. 2/16-68/4)] (in Russian). Санкт-Петербургский Академический институт живописи, скульптуры и архитектуры имени И. Е. Репина. 1999. pp. 116–125.
- Voronkov, S. N. (1999). К вопросу о творчестве Николая Фешина [To the question of Nikolai Feshin's work] (PDF) (in Russian). СПб.: Санкт-Петербургский Академический институт живописи, скульптуры и архитектуры имени И. Е. Репина. p. 125.
- Voronov, V. (1964). Судьба Николая Фешина [The Fate of Nikolai Feshin] (in Russian). Огонёк: журнал.
- Hofman, I. M. (1978). Головин-портретист [Golovin the portrait painter] (in Russian). Л.: Художник РСФСР. p. 163.
- Davtyan, L. (2012). Долгое возвращение Николая Фешина [Nikolai Feshin's long comeback] (in Russian). Иные берега: журнал. pp. 20–31.
- D-v, Vl. (1915). По выставкам [On exhibitions] (in Russian). День: газета. p. 3.
- Dulsky, P. M. (1921). Н. Фешин [N. Fechin]. Библиотека иллюстрированных монографий отдела изобразительных искусств Казанского народного комиссариата по просвещению. Issue 1. (in Russian). Казань: Казанское отделение государственного издательства. p. 32.
- Kaplanovaa, S. G. (1975). "Творческий путь Н. И. Фешина". Николай Иванович Фешин. Документы, письма, воспоминания о художнике: сб. / Сост. и автор комментариев Г. Могильникова [Nicolai Ivanovich Fechin. Documents, letters, memoirs about the artist: collection] (in Russian). Л.: Художник РСФСР. pp. 7–20.
- Kaplanova, S. G. (1964). "Николай Иванович Фешин". Очерки по истории русского портрета конца XIX — начала XX века: сб. ст. / Под ред. Н. Г. Машковцева и Н. Т. Соколовой [Essays on the history of Russian portrait of the late XIX - early XX century: collection of articles] (in Russian). М.: Искусство. pp. 277–294.
- Kornilov, P. Е. (1975). "Воспоминания о Н. И. Фешине". Николай Иванович Фешин. Документы, письма, воспоминания о художнике: сб. / Сост. и автор комментариев Г. Могильникова [Nicolai Ivanovich Fechin. Documents, letters, memories of the artist: collection] (in Russian). Л.: Художник РСФСР. pp. 142–143.
- Kuznetsov, A. E. (2004). "Портрет Вари Адоратской // Николай Фешин. 1881". 1955. Живопись. Рисунок. Из собрания Государственного музея изобразительных искусств Республики Татарстан и частных коллекций. Москва, галерея «Арт-Диваж»: каталог / Вступ. статья И. И. Галеева, Г. П. Тулузаковой, А. Е. Кузнецова [1955. Painting. Drawing. From the collection of the State Museum of Fine Arts of the Republic of Tatarstan and private collections. Moscow, Art-Divage Gallery: catalogue] (in Russian). М.: Скорпион. pp. 18–23.
- Lyubimov, A. A. (1975). "Воспоминания о Н. И. Фешине". Николай Иванович Фешин. Документы, письма, воспоминания о художнике: сб. / Сост. и автор комментариев Г. Могильникова [Nicolai Ivanovich Fechin. Documents, letters, memories of the artist: collection] (in Russian). Л.: Художник РСФСР. pp. 109–119.
- Novitsky, A. I. (1994). Возвращение Вареньки [Varyenka's Homecoming] (in Russian). Казань: журнал. pp. 156–160.
- Novitsky, A. I. (2002). Государственный музей изобразительных искусств Республики Татарстан. Казань [The State Museum of Fine Arts of the Republic of Tatarstan. Kazan]. Сокровища русского искусства (in Russian). М.: Белый город, Государственный музей изобразительных искусств Республики Татарстан. p. 64. ISBN 5-7793-0418-1
- Seryakov, D. G. (2009). "III. 2. «Нон-финито» в портрете". Проблемы «нон-финито» в творчестве Николая Ивановича Фешина: диссертация на соискание учёной степени кандидата искусствоведения [Problems of ‘non-finito’ in the work of Nicolai Ivanovich Fechin: thesis for the degree of Candidate of Art History] (in Russian). М.: Научно-исследовательский институт теории и истории изобразительных искусств Российской академии художеств. pp. 103–118.
- Tuluzakova, G. P. (2014). "Николай Фешин: портреты дочери Ии". Вторые Казанские искусствоведческие чтения: материалы Международной научно-практической конференции. К 130-летию со дня рождения Н. И. Фешина. Казань, 2—3 ноября 2011 г. / Министерство культуры Республики Татарстан, Государственный музей изобразительных искусств Республики Татарстан; редакц. коллегия: Р. М. Нургалеева, Д. Д. Хисамова, О. А. Хабриева: Сборник [Second Kazan Art History Readings: Materials of the International Scientific and Practical Conference. To the 130th anniversary of the birth of N. I. Fechin. Kazan, 2-3 November 2011.] (in Russian). pp. 13–18. ISBN 978-5-93962-688-0.
- Tuluzakova, G. P. (2015). Николай Фешин: Казань – Таос. К 1000-летию Казани [Nicolai Fechin: Kazan - Taos. Towards the 1000th anniversary of Kazan] (in Russian). Третьяковская галере: журнал. pp. 13–18.
- Tuluzakova, G. P. (2007). Николай Фешин: Альбом [Nicolai Fechin: Album]. Русские художники. XX век (in Russian). СПб.: Золотой век. p. 480. ISBN 978-5-342-00105-2.
- Tuluzakova, G. P. (2005). Николай Фешин: Казань – Санта-Фе. К 1000-летию Казани [Nicolai Fechin: Kazan - Santa Fe] (PDF) (in Russian). Третьяковская галерея: журнал. pp. 14–21.
- Tuluzakova, G. P. (2012). Николай Фешин в России [Nicolai Fechin in Russia] (in Russian). Альманах Государственного Русского музея. pp. 9–18. ISBN 978-5-93332-406-5.
- Tuluzakova, G. P. (1998). Эволюция творчества Н. И. Фешина, 1881—1955 гг.: Основные проблемы: диссертация на соискание учёной степени кандидата искусствоведения [Evolution of N. I. Fechin's art, 1881-1955: Main problems : thesis for the degree of Candidate of Art History] (in Russian). СПб.: Санкт-Петербургский государственный академический институт живописи, скульптуры и архитектуры имени И. Е. Репина при Российской академии художеств. p. 221.
- Chebotaryov, K. K. (1975). "Воспоминания о Н. И. Фешине". Николай Иванович Фешин. Документы, письма, воспоминания о художнике: сб. / Сост. и автор комментариев Г. Могильникова [Nicolai Ivanovich Fechin. Documents, letters, memories of the artist: collection] (in Russian). Л.: Художник РСФСР. pp. 82–84.
- Николай Фешин. Каталог выставки произведений Н. И. Фешина в Государственном музее изобразительных искусств Республики Татарстан 22 ноября 2006 — 20 января 2007. Живопись. Графика. Скульптура. Декоративно-прикладное искусство [Nicolai Fechin. Catalogue of the exhibition of works by Nicolai Fechin in the State Museum of Fine Arts of the Republic of Tatarstan 22 November 2006 - 20 January 2007. Painting. Graphics. Sculpture. Decorative and applied art] (in Russian). Казань: Заман. 2006. p. 112. ISBN 5-89052-036-9
- Rozhin, A. (2012). Всё ново, и всё волнует! [Everything is new and everything is exciting!] (in Russian). Третьяковская галерея. pp. 9–18.
- Uspensky, A. M. (2004). Русский Фешин. Выставка Н. И Фешина. Живопись, рисунок. Галерея «Арт-Диваж» 3 июня — 26 июля [Russian Feshin. Exhibition NI Feshin. Painting, drawing. Gallery ‘Art-Divage’ 3 June - 26 July] (PDF) (in Russian). Новый мир искусства: журнал. pp. 16–18.
- Fainbek, A. B. (1983). Художники Татарии [Artists of Tatarstan] (in Russian). Л.: Художник РСФСР. p. 232.
- Valeev Nail, M. (2017). David Burliuk and his Kazan Correspondents (PDF). Russia: Journal of International Network Center for Fundamental and Applied Research: journal. pp. 79–90.
