= Fechin =

Fechin is the name of:

- Féchín of Fore (died 665), Irish saint
- Nicolai Fechin (1881–1955), Russian-American painter
- Eya Fechin (1914–2002), daughter of Nicolai Fechin, his longtime model and memoirist
