= Sapozhnikov =

Sapozhnikov (masculine, Russian: Сапожников) or Sapozhnikova (feminine, Russian: Сапожникова) is a Russian surname, derived from the Russian word "сапожник" (cobbler/shoemaker/bootmaker). Notable people with the surname include:

- Andrei Sapozhnikov (born 1971), Russian Soviet ice hockey player
- Anna Sapozhnikova (born 1997), Russian Paralympic athlete
- Nadezhda Sapozhnikova (1877–1942), Russian painter
