= Fyodor Amlong =

Russian architect

- Born: Fyodor Romanovich Amlong; 17 September 1871; Moscow, Russian Empire
- Citizenship: Russian Empire
- Occupation: Architect

Fyodor Romanovich Amlong (Russian Фёдор Романович Амлонг, German Ferdinand Julius Adolf Friedrich Amlong; born 17 September 1871) was a Russian architect.

== Biography ==
He was born on 17 September 1871 in Moscow, in the family of a Prussian citizen who took Russian citizenship in 1900.

In 1893-1900 he studied at the St. Petersburg Academy of Arts. After ending his studies he received the title of artist-architect and taught architecture at the Kazan Art School until 1903. At the same time, in 1902-1903 he held the position of architect of the Kazan Zemstvo Council. In 1904, Amlong became a Kazan city architect.

In 1913, he opened the construction and technical office "Modern Architecture" (Russian Современное зодчество, Sovremennoe zodchestvo) in the Solomin-Smolin House.

In 1915, he and his family were exiled to the governorate of Irkutsk because of the accusation of espionage in favor of Germany brought against his wife. After the revolution, he returned to Kazan and worked in the 1920s in the Tatar Professional Council.

== Works ==
Amlong is a representative of the Art Nouveau style. The most notable amongst his works are Shamil's house, Podrueva's house, the house of the Commander of the Kazan Military District (presumably) and Klimov's house (1909).
