= Adoratsky =

Adoratsky (Russian: Адора́тский; masculine) or Adoratskaya (Адора́тская; feminine) is a Russian last name. a Russian surname originated in clergy artificially created from the Latin word meaning respected, revered and was introduced in Russian Orthodox seminaries. Notable people with the surname include:

- Varya Adoratskaya, subject of the painting Portrait of Varya Adoratskaya by Nicolai Fechin, Russian–American painter
- Vladimir Adoratsky (1878–1945), Soviet communist historian and political theorist
