= Nadezhda Sapozhnikova =

Russian painter

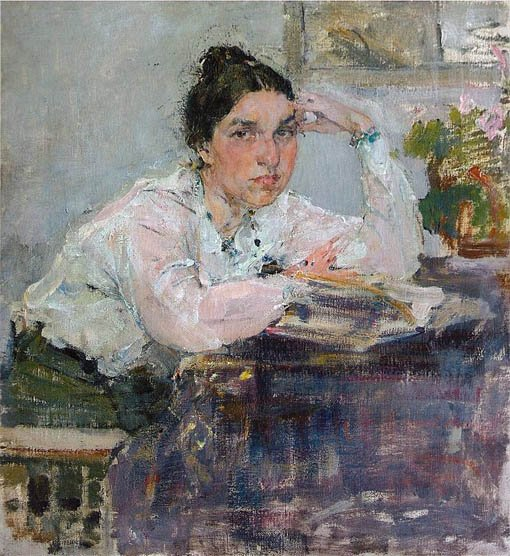
- Portrait of Sapozhnikova by Nicolai Fechin, before 1917
- Born: Nadezhda Mikhailovna Sapozhnikova; 26 March 1877; Kazan, Russian Empire
- Died: 1942 (age 65); Saint Petersburg, Russian Empire
- Education: Kazan Art School
- Known for: Painting
- Patrons: Nicolai Fechin

Nadezhda Sapozhnikova (Russian: Надежда Михайловна Сапожникова; 26 March 1877 – late autumn 1942) was a Russian painter and a maecenas. Sapozhnikova was born in a merchant family and received her education in Kazan. At the age of 27, Nadezhda started to practice painting. Together with her supervisor Nicolai Fechin Sapozhnikova travelled to Paris, where from 1910 to 1912 she studied in the studios of Antonio DeVity and Kees van Dongen. After returning to Kazan, Sapozhnikova opened her own studio and provided Fechin with financial support – she owned 11 of his works, including five portraits of her. Until 1925 Nadezhda taught painting and drawing in Kazan, then moved to Moscow. In the 1930s, she eventually finished her career as an artist. Up to now, only a few works of Sapozhnikova have been preserved; some of her paintings are exhibited at the National Gallery of Art "Hazine".

== Biography ==
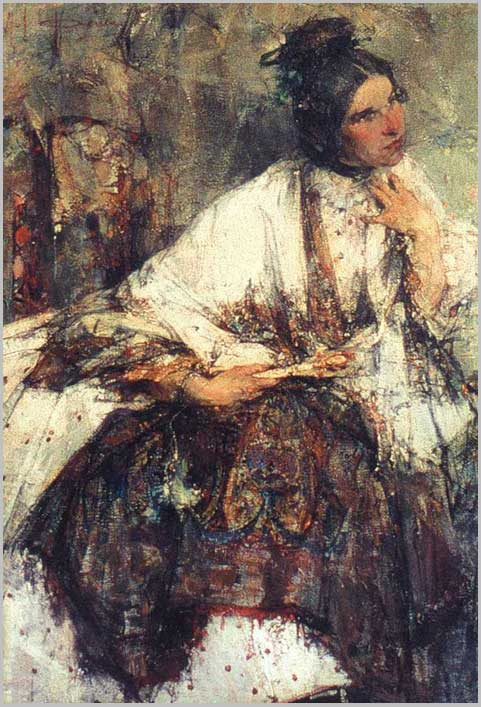
Nicolai Fechin, Portrait of Nadezhda Sapozhnikova, 1908

Nadezhda Mikhailovna Sapozhnikova was born in Kazan on 26 March 1877, the seventh child in the merchant family of Mikhail and Serafima Sapozhnikova. Her father owned a manufactory shop. Despite having 11 children, Serafima Sapozhnikova educated them by herself without hiring a governess. In 1888, Nadezhda was enrolled to the Marrinski Women’s Gymnasium where she showed drawing abilities. After graduating in 1895, Nadezhda Sapozhnikova received a home teacher degree, and taught in the local sunday school. Besides, she also graduated from the music school of Rudolf Gummert. At that time, Sapozhnikova expressed her aesthetic aspirations through wood-crafting and porcelain painting; her teacher advised Nadezhda to do art professionally. Before that, Sapozhnikova received medical education and became a Sister of Mercy, but was too sensitive to work in a hospital. In 1904, at the age of 27, Nadezhda Sapozhnikova got enrolled in the Kazan Art School. She demonstrated notable success, but her talents were fully realized only when in 1908 painter Nicolai Fechin moved to Kazan. Fechin was Sapozhnikova's professor, but because she was older than him for four years and had a higher level of cultural and common education than other students, they soon started to communicate on equal terms. For many years of friendship with Nadezhda, Fechin painted five portraits of hers, the first of which appeared in 1908. This work was famous under different names: "Portrait of N. M. S. in shawls" (Russian: Портрет Н. М. С. в шали) and "Portrait of M-lle Sapozhnikova" (Russian: Портрет М-lle Сапожниковой). The second name was mainly used in international exhibitions. Fechin debuted with this portrait at the international exhibition «Carnegie Institute» in Pittsburgh.

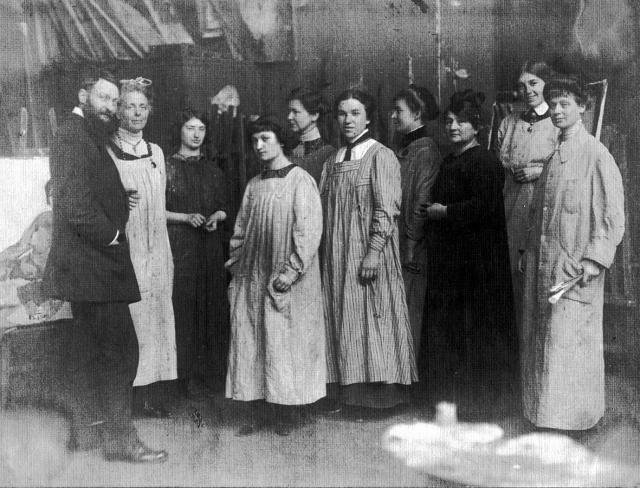
Nadezhda Sapozhnikova (sixth to the left, closer to the center) among the students of van Dongen’s studio

In 1910 Nadezhda Sapozhnikova graduated from the Kazan Art School and together with Fechin went on a trip, visiting Berlin, Munich, Verona, Venice, Milan, Padua, Florence, Rome, Naples, and Vienna. The journey ended in Paris. Soon Fechin decided that he had nothing left to learn in Europe, and came back to Kazan. Sapozhnikova stayed in Paris until 1912, working in van Dongen’s open studio. There were rumors about her close relationship with Fechin since Sapozhnikova never got married and did not have any family or children.

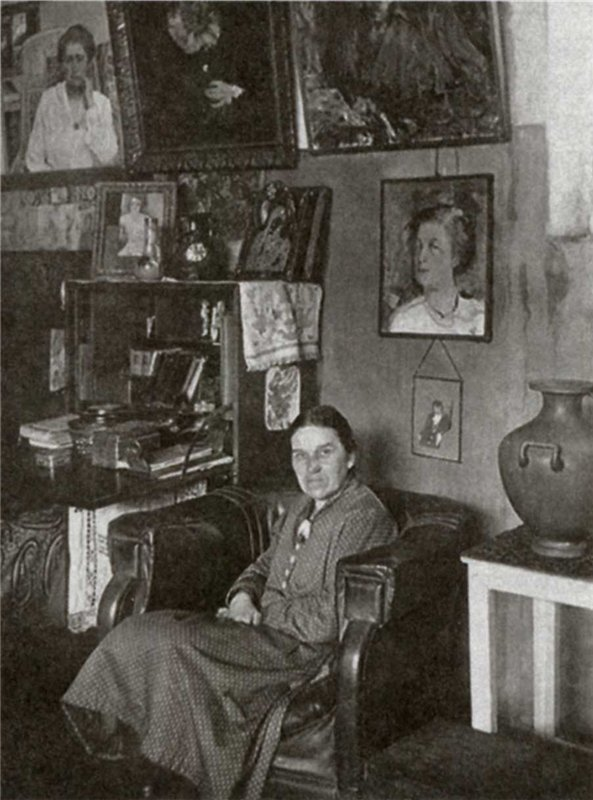
Nadezhda Sapozhnikova in her studio. In the center above hangs the Portret Adoratskoi by Fechin, before 1917

After coming back to Kazan, Sapozhnikova founded her own studio. Her brother Konstantin attached to the main building of his firm in Petrapavlovsky Lane (now – Ulica Rahmatullina) a special building. Sapozhnikova's studio quickly became the art center of Kazan where painters – both teachers and students – gathered together. In their memoirs, visitors often mentioned pelmeni and coffee, with which Sapozhnikova treated those who came to her studio. In 1914–1916, according to the Konstantin Chebotaryov's unpublished manuscript "Sledy", Sapozhnikova organized nude drawing sessions, during which only female painters were allowed to present (including Vera Vil'koviskaia). For “boys” such sessions were organized at different time. Nadezhda Sapozhnikova was also a maecenas, helping Fechin by ordering portraits of her relatives and friends. She also paid tuition fees for low-income students so they can study at the Kazan Art School. There was a piano in her studio, on which her relative Konstantin Samarski usually played. The instrument appeared at the insistence of Fechin, who was extremely musical.

In the Sapozhnikova's studio, Fechin made carved furniture in a Neo-Russian style (most of the objects have not been preserved). Painter spent his time there every day; he wrote in this studio many of his famous works, such as "Portrait of Varya Adoratskaya" who was a niece of Sapozhnikova. As a painter, Nadezhda, in general, specialized on portraits, together with Fechin participating in the Kazan exhibitions. In 1913, Sapozhnikova initiated the establishment of the handicraft industry museum industry dedicated to the Kazan provincial zemstvo. For this purpose, two students of the Tatar gymnasium of Aitova were sent to her studio.

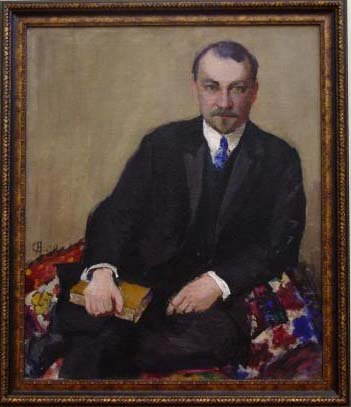
Sapozhnikova. Portrait of unknown. the National Gallery of Art "Hazine"

After the Russian Revolution of 1917, Sapozhnikova opened in Kazan a free handicraft school for girls. From 1919 to 1924 she taught painting at the rabfak of the Kazan Federal University. At the same time, she worked in the Kazan Art School, and took a lead of the Fichin's studio after he emigrated to the USA. In 1925, she left Kazan and moved in with her relatives Adoratskys in Moscow. Her last years were controversially described; according to some information, in the 1930s she continued to teach art in Moscow. After going through disease, she moved to Nikolina Gora. According to the memories of her niece Vera Adoratskaya, at late autumn of 1942, a goat ran away from one of Sapozhnikova' neighbours. She left her house to look for it, and after got a strong caught from which she could not recover from.

== Exhibitions ==
Sapozhnikova participated in Kazan periodical exhibitions of 1909, 1914, 1915 and 1916. In 1920 and 1921, she also participated in the 1st and 2nd state exhibitions of art, sculpture and architecture. In 1909, in his review on the periodical exhibition of the Art school, Konstantin Chebotaryov mentioned that Sapozhnikova' portraits clearly illustrate "Sapozhnikova's sharpness and fidelity of characteristics", and that she is "more a portraitist than Fichin himself".

According to Chebotaryov's reviews, after Sapozhnikova had studied with van Dongen, she implemented a "planar background" in her paintings. Generally, it is hard to judge Sapozhnikova's style since few of her works have been preserved, and, apparently, neither she or her entourage considered her as a serious painter. According to G. Tuluzakova, Sapozhnikova's art "does not pretend to be particularly significant, but is really important for defining the main characteristics of Kazan art life in the 1910-1920s".

== Sources ==
- "Надежда Михайловна Сапожникова. Художник, меценат, педагог". Генеалогический форум ВГД.
- Тахтамышева Н. А. "Надежда Михайловна Сапожникова. Казань". Фотопрогулки: генеалогия, история, краеведение, фото..
- Galeev, I. I., ed. (2005). АРХУМАС. Казанский авангард 20-х гг [ARKHUMAS: Kazan Avant-garde of the 20s] (in Russian). Moscow: Скорпион. p. 170. ISBN 5-86408-120-5.
- Ладушина И. (2014). "Гороховецкие Сапожниковы в Казани: Надежда Михайловна Сапожникова — ученица художника Н. И. Фешина". Vol. 33, no. 10847. Новая жизнь. p. 9.
- Н. И. Фешин: Документы, письма, воспоминания о художнике. Moscow: Художник РСФСР. 1975. p. 172.
- Тулузакова Г. П. (2007). Николай Фешин: альбом. СПб.: Золотой век. pp. 68–70. ISBN 978-5-342-00105-2.
