= Eya Fechin =

Model for Nikolai Fechin, dancer and art therapist

- Ия Николаевна Фешина
- Born: 14 June 1914; Kazan, Russian Empire
- Died: 20 September 2002; Taos, New Mexico, United States
- Occupations: model; dancer; art therapist; art historian
- Spouses: Dane Rudhyar; Bennett Branham
- Children: Nikaela
- Relatives: Nicolai Fechin, father Aleksandra Fechina, mother

Eya Nicolaevna Fechin (June 14, 1914, Kazan, Russian Empire – September 20, 2002, Taos, USA) was the daughter of and thereby the long-serving model for a Russian, Soviet and American artist Nicolai Fechin; and a psychic, dancer and psychiatrist (art therapist), author of memoirs about Nicolai Fechin, books and articles about his work, and founder of a private museum in Taos dedicated to his work. Her father's biographer, Galina Tuluzakova, calls his portraits of her "unconditional masterpieces", stating: "Each of the numerous portraits of the daughter reflects both the immensity of paternal love and the brilliant skill of a great artist. In Tuluzakova's opinion, in Fechin's portraits of Eya "ideal and real, desirable and real, life and art happily united". According to the poet and artist Pavel Radimov, the last chairman of the Peredvizhniki Society and the first chairman of the Association of Artists of Revolutionary Russia, "Eya's head is shining in Fechin's numerous sketches and studies with all the joy of his paternal love".

Fechin created pictorial portraits, pencil drawings, and carved images of his daughter from her birth to her twentieth birthday. About forty of these portraits are known, most of them in museums and private collections in Russia and the United States. As of 2011, three sketches and one miniature were identified in Russian collections (one more is in question). The whereabouts of some of Nicolai Fechin's paintings of his daughter are unknown.

== Biography ==
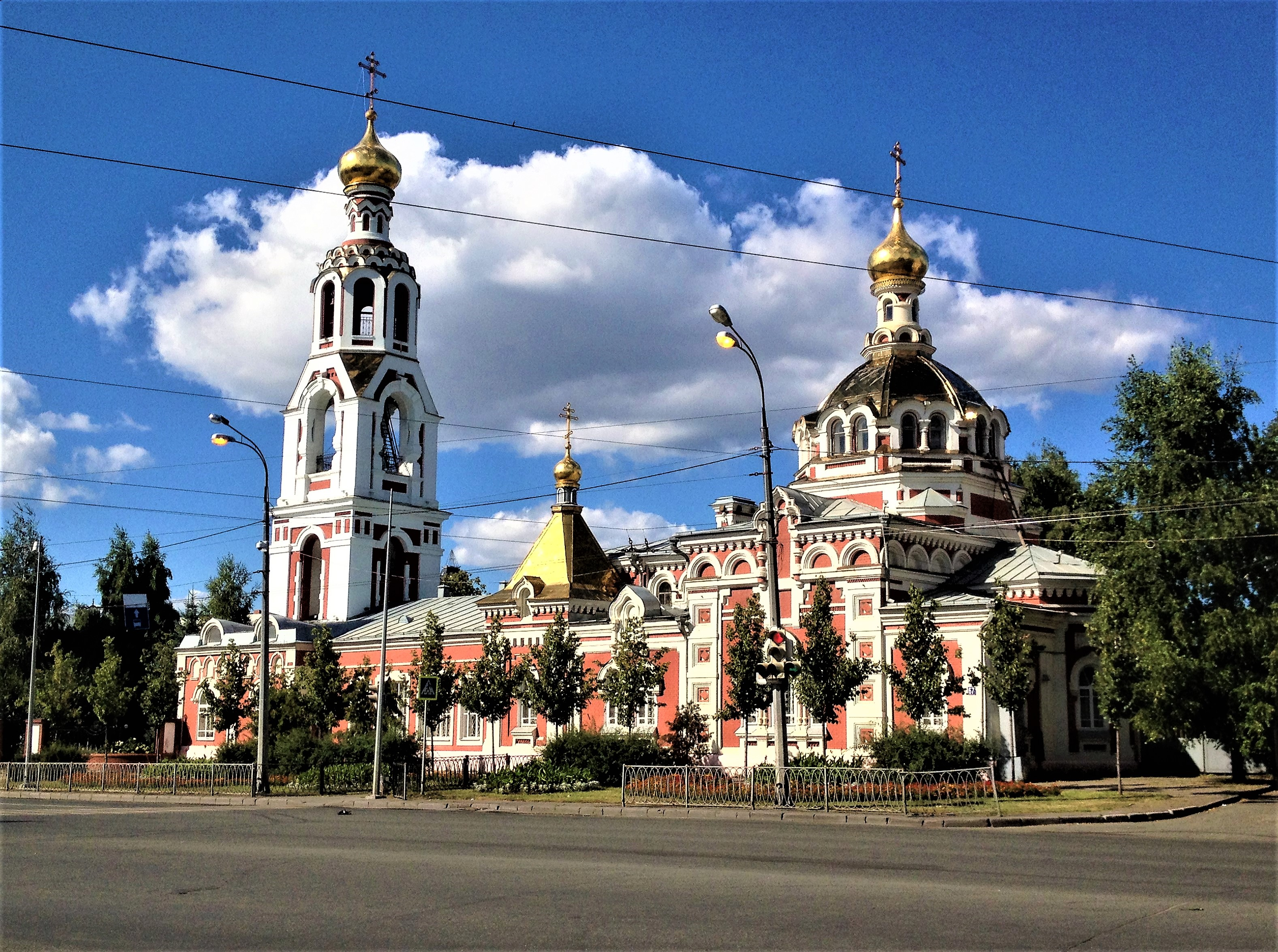
Varvarinskaya Church (Kazan), where Eya Fechin was baptized

Eya Fechin was born in 1914 in Kazan into the family of the artist Nicolai Ivanovich Fechin, who was already well known in Russia and Europe. Her mother, Alexandra Nikolayevna Fechin (née Belkovich), one of the daughters of the first director of the Kazan Art School, was eleven years younger than her husband. The girl was baptized in the local church of St. Barbara the Great Martyr. The father, according to Galina Tuluzakova, "idolized" his only child, and his daughter fully reciprocated – her attitude to her father was "reverent" (in 1933, when Nicolai Ivanovich and Alexandra Nikolaevna divorced, Eya stayed with her father). Fechin continuously painted studies and portraits of Eya from the time of her birth, marking his daughter's maturation. Many sketches "impress with their accuracy, emotional intensity and brilliant pictorial mastery".

There is a small amount of documentary evidence from contemporaries about Eya Fechin's childhood in Russia. Natalia Krotova, who posed for her father, wrote in her memoirs about visiting the Fechins: "There I met his daughter Eya, who was also out for a walk. We spent a pleasant hour with her. She was about six years old. She was very well-behaved, not at all shy, and chatted happily with me". Eya Fechin occupies an important place in her mother Alexandra Fechin's book March of the Past (1937), which consists of two stories in English about the flight of the White Guards from Kazan and the life of the Fechin family in Vasilievo, 30 versts from Kazan, during the Civil War.

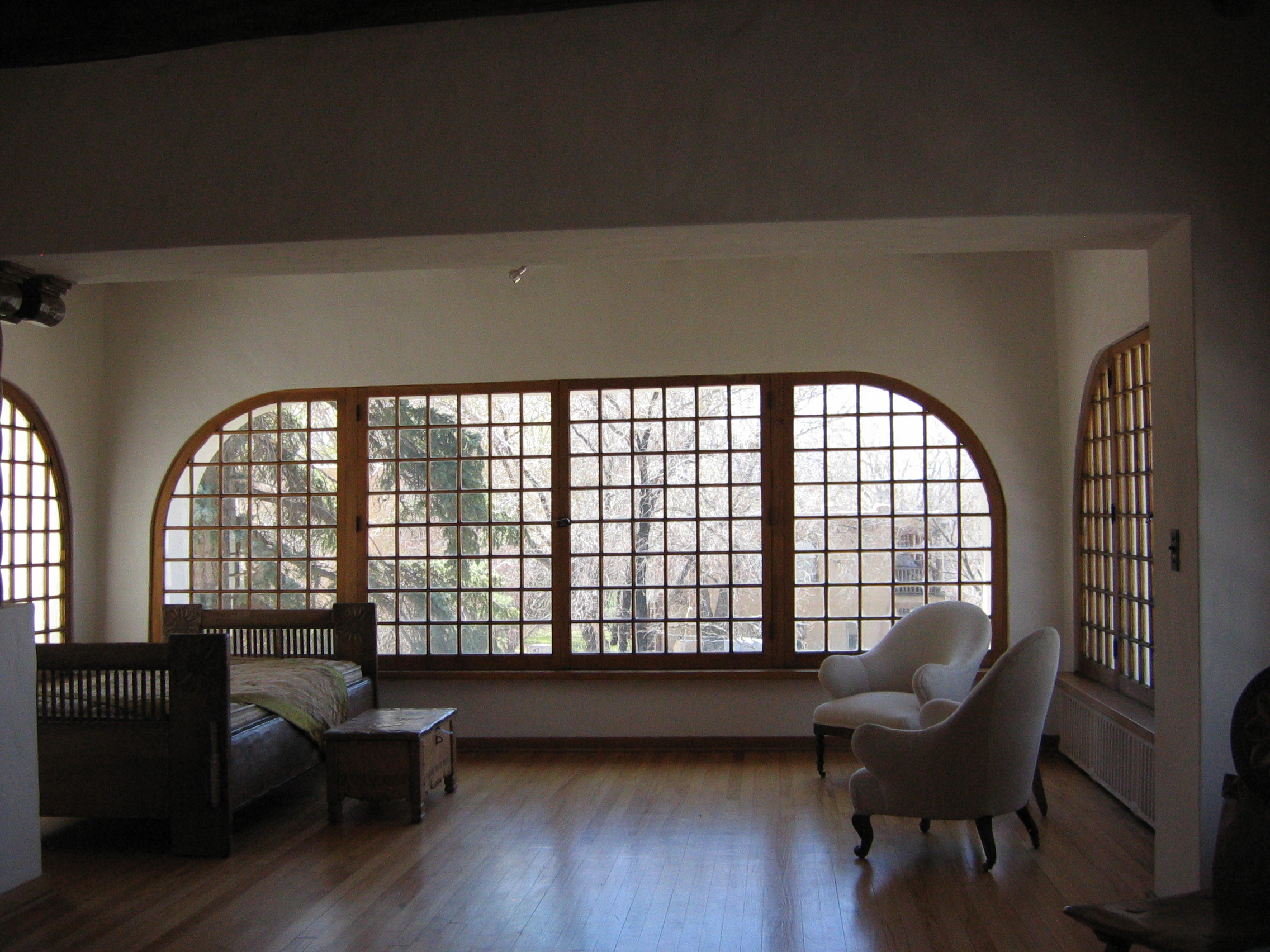
Nicolai Fechin's house in Taos: Eya's bed on view in the second level sunroom

In 1923, Eya emigrated to the United States with her parents at the age of nine. The family first settled in New York City. In 1927, they moved to Taos, New Mexico, where they stayed with Mabel Dodge Luhan, patroness of the Taos art colony. The Fechin family soon purchased seven acres (2.8 ha) of land. According to his design, Nicolai Fechin built a house with a studio on it. Eya recalled (keeping the spelling and style of the original):

They bought horses for me, and I rode almost every day, sometimes with Helen Blumenschein (daughter of the painter Ernest Blumenschein). I had tutors. (Note: Eya Feshina had private teachers of music and riding.) The first (and the longest) was Mrs. Phillips, wife of the painter Bert Phillips...

During the American period of her childhood, Eya was constantly around personalities in music, fine arts and literature, among them the writer Frieda Lawrence and the artist Dorothy Brett.

In 1933, after her parents' divorce, Eya stayed with her father. He described that event in a letter to his brother Pavel Fechin:

Fascinated by a poet, she wanted to be a writer herself. You know how she is with her impulsive nature, putting everything upside down. She ruined my life. I'm not kidding, after living with someone for more than 20 years, you have to start over. It was unbearably painful. Of course, during the divorce, she took everything of value that was acquired by me here in America, and we are now with Eya real homeless. She ruined both our lives and hers...Eya's, so attached to her mother before, has now lost her friendship and is attached to me and lives with me. She has decided to be a dancer and is working very hard and feels more or less happy. Poor girl, she has suffered the most.

Fechin and his daughter spent the winter in New York and then moved to Los Angeles. The house in Taos was registered in the name of Fechin's wife and remained with her. It turned out that Fechin and his daughter were not adapted to independent daily life (the household was previously run by Alexandra Fechin): they did not know how to sign cheques, to order a hotel room, or to cook (the only dish that Eya could cook was buckwheat porridge). In 1945, Eya married and left California, where her father stayed.

Eya Fechin studied modern dance and became a professional dancer. In the 1930s, she performed in Igor Stravinsky's ballet The Rite of Spring at the Hollywood Bowl. In 1936, she was a member of the Communist Ballet Company under the direction of choreographer Lester Horton. After her dancing career ended, she tried to combine dance with psychiatry and found herself among the pioneers of art therapy. In particular, like her first husband, she was personally acquainted with Jacob Levi Moreno, the founder of psychodrama, sociometry, and group psychotherapy. In the 1940s, Fechin earned a degree as a modern dance therapist and founded an art therapy department at the Iowa State Mental Hospital. In the first half of the 1950s, she worked as a mental health specialist in New York City. For a long time, she lived in San Cristobal, New Mexico, where a special stage was built for dance therapy. she wrote a small booklet devoted to the problems of self-knowledge in the process of art therapy, published in 1949.

Eya Feshina at different periods of her life
- Eya Feshina with her first husband
- Eya Feshina with her daughter at the reburial of Nikolai Feshin's ashes at the Arskoye cemetery in Kazan, 1976
- | Anne Nelson Sweet. Portrait of Eya Feshina in her old age

=== Private life ===
Eya Fechin was married twice. The first time was from 1945 to 1954, to the writer, modernist composer, abstractionist painter, poet, philosopher, and astrologer Dane Rudhyar.

For the second time, from 1954, her husband was Bennett Branham, who also was her partner in art psychotherapy and co-author of scientific articles. Their marriage was registered on April 26, 1954, in Los Angeles. The Santa Fe New Mexican newspaper wrote in a 2002 obituary about Eya Fechin's divorce from her second husband and her separation from him (Eya lived with her daughter in Taos and Albuquerque).

From her second marriage, Eya had a daughter, Nicaela named in honor of her grandfather.

=== Popularization of her father's work ===
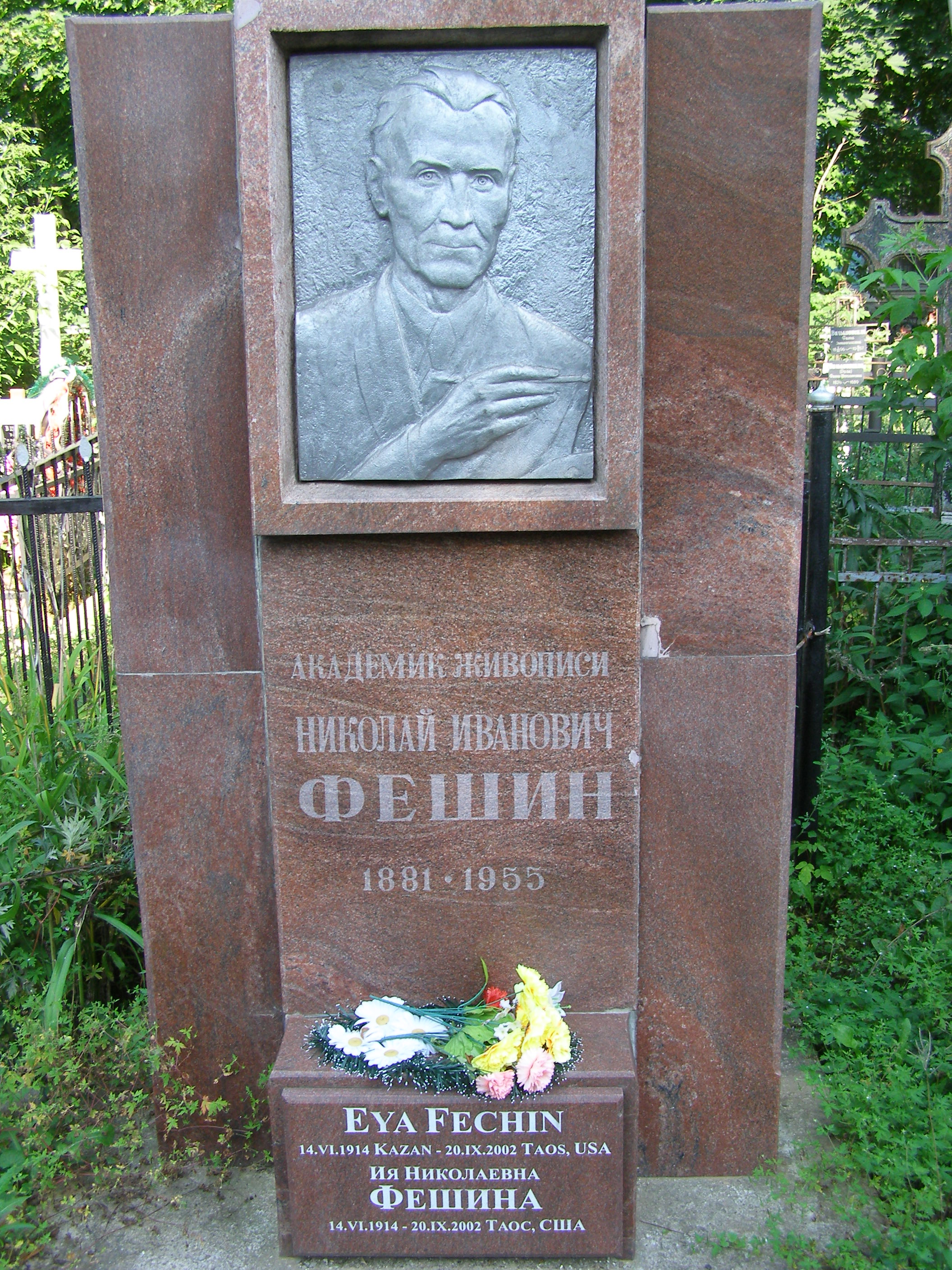
Nicolai Fechin and his daughter's grave at the Arsky cemetery in Kazan

After her mother's death in 1983, Fechin's house in Taos was inherited by Eya Nikolayevna. She restored it and reconstructed its interiors to resemble their appearance when her father was alive. The house became a private museum. Eya Nikolayevna registered the Fechin Institute, a non-profit organization that supported the house as a museum. The Institute organized exhibitions of contemporary artists, and published catalogs and its own periodical newsletter. Its staff included Eya Nikolayevna herself and volunteers. Fechin gave lectures on psychology and art history. She shared her memories of her father, and provided his paintings from her collection for exhibitions. With Eya's participation, a hotel in the style of Nicolai Fechin's house was built in Taos. Part of its income was intended to support the museum, but this plan could not be realized, and the hotel was soon closed.

Galina Tuluzakova noted the importance of Eya Fechin's memoirs in reconstructing her father's views on art. Eya wrote that he appreciated abstract art: “...I wanted my father to experiment in this direction. He replied that he had not yet fully exhausted or perfected his style of painting. He regretted that his imagination was not free enough because he had studied for too long...” She also noted that her father admired the work of Pablo Picasso and Carlos Mérida, one of whose sketches he had acquired. She mentioned his love of architecture and his desire to explore it. Tuluzakova observed that Eya Fechin created an “almost mythological image” of her father. According to the art historian:

She practically dissolved in her love and adoration for the memory of her nearest and dearest. Her reminiscences, commentaries, and numerous interviews are of exceptional value for understanding the artist's personality and many important facts and details of his American life...

The second half of her life, Eya dedicated to preserving her father's memory. She made significant efforts to popularize his art, including writing the foreword to a 1975 book about his work by artist Mary Balcom, and creating her father's archive. At Eya's insistence, her father's ashes were reburied in Kazan in 1976. She also returned some of Fechin's works to his homeland, donating several graphic works to the Tretyakov Gallery and not only drawings but also paintings and sculptures to the museum in Kazan. With her help, an exhibition of his paintings from collections in the USSR and the United States was held in Kazan, Leningrad, Santa Fe, and New York in 1976. She also succeeded in having Nicolai Fechin's house in Taos added to the National Register of Historic Places in the United States. It now (as of 2019) belongs to the private Taos Art Museum at Fechin House, where it exhibits paintings by Nicolai Fechin as well as works by artists who were members of the Taos Society of Artists in the 1910s and 1930s.

In 2002, Eya Fechin was buried next to her father, fulfilling her mother's last wish.

== Eya Fechin in her father's work ==
Fechin portrayed children from his student days until the end of his life. He believed that childhood was “an organic state, free from the layers of time and social conditions”. According to Tuluzakova, in his children's portraits, Fechin expressed his belief in an a priori harmony of human nature and approached his subjects with genuine seriousness rather than sentimentality. He captured the plasticity of movement, the tenderness of emerging facial features, and the liveliness and restlessness of childhood. A hallmark of Fechin's Russian period was his children's portrait, Portrait of Varya Adoratskaya (1914, collection of the State Museum of Fine Arts of the Republic of Tatarstan, Kazan).

Eya Fechin in portraits made by her father
- Nikolai Fechin. Portrait of Eya, 1910s
- Nikolai Fechin. Portrait of daughter Eya, 1917

The gallerist and collector Ildar Galeyev noted that the father's love and tenderness created images of his daughter “full of amazing harmony”. Art critic, playwright, and poet Larisa Davtyan observed that in her father's portraits, the daughter never smiles. Her face is always intensely focused, and she appears deep in reflection. The images of the child, devoid of overt emotion, convey a sense of childhood through the attributes captured by the artist. Eya recalled posing for her father: “We [my mother and I] were free models. He could do what he wanted, and he didn't have to please us.” She described herself as having "posed silently, mesmerized by the style of his work". Dean Porter wrote that Fechin's early portraits depict Eya as a baby, symbolizing innocence, then as a girl just beginning to learn about the world, later as an “all-knowing teenager”, and finally as a “sophisticated young woman”. According to Porter, the tendencies of Impressionism are clearest in the portraits of Fechin's wife Alexandra, and Eya He noted that over time, the portraits of Eya became increasingly formal and no longer represented the carefree image of a girl enjoying “galante holidays”. In addition to numerous portraits of his daughter, Fechin created at least five double portraits of her with her mother. Three of these were painted in New York: Mother and Child (1923), Summer (Portrait of Alexandra Fechin with daughter Eya, 1924), and Mrs. Fechin with Daughter (1925). Some art historians consider these among the best works from Fechin's American period.

== Eya in paintings of the Russian period ==
Before leaving the USSR, Fechin made a large number of sketches of Eya. From the time he settled in Kazan (1910) until his departure for the United States (1923), he painted portraits of people who were close and interesting to him: friends, students of the Kazan Art School, especially often his father, wife, and daughter. Rarely are there portraits made to order, but even these are predominantly images of representatives of artistic and scientific intellectuals.

These paintings are now known from exhibition catalogs of the 1920s (at the Second State Exhibition in Kazan in 1921, four portraits of Eya were exhibited at once). Art historian Pyotr Dulsky, in the first monograph on Fechin's work (published in Kazan in 1921), mentions several pictures of his daughter that the artist made in 1919 alone. He calls them "color sketches". Fechin took a significant number of these portraits abroad. In the family archive, a list of paintings approved for export was found, showing nine painting studies and two miniatures of his daughter. Natalia Krotova recalled:

In the spring of 1923 I found out that Nicolai Ivanovich was going on a long trip abroad, to America. I was very sorry that Kazan would lose him. I tried to buy something from him.... But there were no suitable things, and he did not want to sell the portraits of his little daughter...

In the sketch Eya Baby (1914–1915, oil on canvas, 14.25 in. × 14.25 in. (36 × 36 cm), I. Fechin-Branham Collection, Taos, USA), Tuluzakova was fascinated by the girl's gaze – “open to the world, slightly surprised eyes of a child, greedily absorbing the surroundings.” In the sketch Sleeping Eya (about 1916–1917, sometimes referred to as Sketch with Sleeping Eya, 19 × 32 cm, in 1964 was in the collection of Pavel Radimov in Abramtsevo, in 1998 Tuluzakova mentioned it as being in the collection of Radimov's heirs in Moscow. In the 2007 edition, she mistakenly dates this work to 1913, when the girl was not yet born), painting is combined with fragments of blank canvas. Tuluzakova called Eya's three portrait sketches from 1917 to 1919 “real pearls”:

- one from the collection of the Kozmodemyansk Cultural and Historical Museum Complex: Portrait of Eya, 1919, canvas, oil, 20 × 17 cm, inventory number – KP-9064;
- one from the collection of the State Museum of Fine Arts of the Republic of Tatarstan (GMII RT): Portrait of daughter Eya, 1917 (?), canvas, oil, 23.8 × 29.5 cm, inventory number Zh-1288, for a long time the portrait was in the collection of Dulskaya, from whom it was donated to the museum in 1974;
- one from a private collection in St. Petersburg.

In the sketch from the collection of the Kozmodemyansk Cultural and Historical Museum Complex, textured paste painting “conveys the effects of sunlight penetrating the curls of a little girl”. The girl's large and serious eyes look into the distance. The father has captured the upturned nose and plump lips of his daughter. She is wearing a white collar and a pinkish blouse with golden-green reflections. Fechin painted her face with a smooth texture, and her hair “broadly and pastosely”. Dmitry Seryakov characterized this portrait as a sunny and bright study. He noted that “subtle shades of delicate yellow and ochre shades in contrast with the blue of the eyes, the author creates a touching emotional image of a little girl”. Art historian and artist Sergei Voronkov calls this work of Fechin's distinguished by the special beauty of color and painterly skill. Eya's head is depicted in close-up against a background of greenery and a tree trunk. The rays of the sun create a radiant halo around the girl's face. Voronkov wrote that it seems as if “the canvas is molded with some precious emerald amber mass. In the portrait he saw ‘magic’ colors, in the process of which is born a natural living form".

Voronkov noted that in portrait of Eya made in 1919:

The seeming simplicity, carelessness, almost ‘dabbing’ with paints, at a distance turns into a surprisingly beautiful and expressive childlike image of an inquisitive, intelligent girl. The lively gaze of her blue eyes is turned directly at the viewer... The volume of the face is molded by a subtle play of light, shadow, and reflexes from the white collar, blue blouse, and brown hair.

In the collection of the State Museum of Fine Arts of the Republic of Tatarstan, there is also the miniature Portrait of a Daughter (1920–1922, cardboard, oil, diameter 7.5 cm, with the artist's signature "Fechin" at the bottom, inventory number Zh-1434). The miniature was received in 1978 from Y. S. Porfirieva.

In her dissertation, Tuluzakova also mentions Portrait of a Daughter (1914–1915, canvas, oil, 13 in. × 10 in. (33 × 25 cm), I. Fechin-Brenham Collection, Taos, USA), portrait of Eya with her Mother (1914, canvas, oil, USA, exact location unknown), portrait of Eya (1923 (?), canvas, oil (?), location unknown), and two more portraits of a girl (year of creation unknown, but made before Fechin's departure abroad; presumed to be oil on canvas (?)), which are known from black-and-white photographs stored in the State Museum of Fine Arts. It is supposed that Eya could be depicted in them. In a 2007 book about Fechin's work, Tuluzakova names other works by Fechin from the Russian period: Mother and Child (Portrait of A. N. Fechin with her daughter, 1914 (?), canvas, oil, 61 × 50.8 cm, collection of the Stark Museum of Art, Orange, Texas), and Mrs. Fechin with her daughter (1922 (?), canvas, oil, 67.5 × 60 cm, private collection in the United States).

== Eya in paintings of the New York period ==
In 1923, Fechin left the USSR and settled in the United States. In New York, Fechin tried, as far as he could, not to paint to order and used his wife and daughter as models. In addition, he invited familiar artists to pose for him. He presented these portraits at exhibitions. Among his works from this period are Eya with Cantelope (1923), Summer (Portrait of Alexandra Fechin with her daughter Eya, 1924), Mother and Daughter (1923, canvas, oil, 75 × 100 cm, Hellen Williams Collection, USA), Mrs. Fechin and Daughter (at the samovar, Eng. Mrs. Fechin and Daughter, 1925, canvas, oil, 88.1 × 80.6 cm, collection of Vadim Kossinski), all of which are in private collections in the Russian Federation and the United States, as well as Eya after a Shower (1923–1924, Woolaroc Museum, Bartlesville, Oklahoma, USA). In this painting, according to Tuluzakova, Fechin combined technical refinement with paternal love. The daughter appears in these works by Fechin in plein air and interior settings. According to Tuluzakova, they are stylistically close to the paintings of the Russian period and often are variations on Fechin's favorite themes.

From the same period comes the wooden sculpture Eya (between 1927 and 1933, collection of I. Fechin-Brenham, USA; bronze casts are in the State Museum of Fine Arts of the Republic of Tatarstan). Seryakov believed that the sculpture was one of the best depictions of Fechin's daughter. The face of the sculpture is detailed and polished, appearing fragile against the background of a mop of hair cut out by sharp movements of the chisel. The girl has a high forehead, tightly compressed lips, and wide cheekbones. According to Seryakov, the face is in the chaos of the rough outlines of its surroundings. He noted that, viewing the sculpture from different angles, the viewer is taken by surprise by the play of volumes, which are transformed by each new angle.

In her dissertation, Tuluzakova also mentions the painting Eya (1923 (?), whereabouts unknown), which belongs to the New York period of Fechin's work. In her 2007 book, she mentions the paintings Eya (1923–1926, canvas, oil, 42.2 × 32.2 cm, collection of the Stark Museum of Art ) and Portrait of Eya (1923–1926, oil, 42.2 × 32.2 cm, collection of the Stark Museum of Arts), as well as Eya (1923–1926, canvas, oil, 42.2 × 32.2 cm, Stark Museum of Art collection) and portrait of Eya (1923 (?), canvas, oil, 52.5 × 55 cm, private collection, USA).

=== Eya with Cantelope ===
- Nikolai Fechin. Eya with Cantelope, 1923
- Nikolai Fechin. Summer, 1924

The painting Eya with Cantaloupe or My daughter Eya (1923) is discussed by Galina Tuluzakova, who claimed that by 1998 the canvas was in the private collection of Forrester Fenn, Santa Fe. American researcher Dean Porter, in 2012, attributed the painting to a private collection in Idaho. The dimensions are listed as either 83.8 × 89 cm or 82.5 × 87.5 cm. According to Tuluzakova, this work is a paraphrase of Portrait of Varya Adoratskaya and continues Fechin's exploration of plein air and interior compositional portraits. In the painting, Eya is sitting at a table, holding a cut musk melon. Next to her, Fechin has placed a still life with apples, pears, plums, a pineapple, and bunches of flowers. The fruits, painted in a brown range from black to yellow, first attract the viewer's attention. The background features drapery. The figure of the girl, as in Portrait of Varya Adoratskaya, is shifted to the side, her face is half-turned, and her eyes are downcast. She is set against a different color scheme, formed by the grayish-white background, tablecloth, dress, golden hair, and delicate skin of Eya. The contrast of colors reveals, according to Tuluzakova, her fragility, “almost immateriality”. At the same time, she believes that Eya's portrait is not perceived as a generalized image of childhood or an embodiment of the hope of the era, as is the case with Portrait of Varya Adoratskaya, although its pictorial tasks are more complex. Dean Porter noted the naturalness and freshness of the image in the portrait.

The artist who organized Fechin's emigration, Jack R. Hunter, office manager of the John Hancock Financial and a collector of Nicolai Fechin's work, recalled this painting in a memoir written at the request of Eya Fechin in 1959: “When I arrived in New York, Fechin had begun work on a portrait of his daughter Eya sitting at a table with lots of fruit. I bought the work before it was finished".

=== Mother and Child ===
Among the sketches and paintings of this period, a special place is occupied by the joint portraits of Fechin's wife and daughter. The canvas Mother & Child (1923) was dated by art historian Sofia Kaplanova to the years 1915–1916, based on the apparent age of the girl in the portrait. The painting depicts Fechin's wife with Eya reading a book. Tuluzakova noted the successful transfer of mood and composition. Kaplanova wrote that in the painting one can feel the artist's lyrical quality. The mother clings to the child, while the girl stares intently at her father, who is painting her. According to Kaplanova, Fechin depicted “the hidden tenderness in the child's serious, inquisitive gaze, and the depth of maternal love”. The Soviet art historian praised the lyricism and masterful pictorial execution, calling the painting one of the best solutions to the theme of motherhood in Fechin's work.

=== Summer ===
The painting was created by Nikolai Fechin in Stroudsburg, Pennsylvania. Tuluzakova called it one of the highest points in the development of his plein air painting. Summer (Note: In Galina Tuluzakova's dissertation, the painting appears erroneously under the title Spring, and on page 37, there is even a reproduction of the painting Summer with the signature Spring. However, on page 201, the title of the painting is given correctly.) (also known by the title Portrait of Mrs. Alexandra Fechin with Her daughter Eya, 1924, canvas, oil, 125 × 125 cm, National Cowboy Hall of Fame and Western Heritage Center, Oklahoma City, USA) depicts a breakfast scene in a sun-drenched meadow.

In 1926, the painting Summer was awarded the Grand Silver Medal at the International Exhibition in Philadelphia. Tuluzakova wrote that in the casual scene of breakfast in a sunny glade, Nikolai Fechin expressed his admiration for the world and humanity. The size of the canvas, in her opinion, emphasizes the importance of the painting for its author. Tuluzakova noted the "decorative Impressionism" in the canvas, as well as the depiction of sunlight, which became “one of the main characters” and “the carrier of emotional content", Fechin managed to convey its shimmering, vibrating quality of space. In contrast to the space that dissolves in a stream of light, the painting of faces and hands is dense, with highlights emphasizing the materiality of the form. Dean Porter has called the painting “a symphony of pastel colors”.

=== Miss Fechin with Her Daughter ===
Nikolai Fechin assigned the foreground of this painting to still life, while the figures of the characters are framed by elements such as a table or a samovar. The overall composition of his painting “combines still life and genre painting, while the painting remains a portrait”. Tuluzakova emphasized the balance of static and dynamic, calculated and spontaneous, pictorial and decorative elements, as well as the mood of peace, warmth, and soft intonation indicative of family happiness. She described the canvas as “a perfect example of the artist's incredible mastery”. The painting stayed in the private collection of Forrest Fenn for a long time and was exhibited at his Art Gallery. It is considered the last in a series of double portraits of Alexandra and Eya. It was rarely exhibited; Sotheby's art historians suggest it was shown only once, at a Montana Historical Society show in 1981. In 2013, the painting was sold at Sotheby's auction for £1,482,500.

== Eya's portraits of the Taos (1927–1933) and California periods (1933 to the late 1930s) ==
Portrait of Eya (in purple tones, 1928, Taos Museum of Art at the Fechin House) and Portrait of Eya in Profile (also known as Portrait of Eya (in Profile), 1927–1933, canvas, oil, private collection, USA) are perceived by Tuluzakova as attempts to stylize the Renaissance. The first painting has a delicate color scheme. In Eya in Peasant Blouse (1933, canvas, oil, 61.1 × 50.5 cm or 60.3 × 49.7 cm, private collection, USA), there is no stylization; instead, it is distinguished by the naturalness and freshness of the image, built on the contrasts of large, carelessly placed spots of black and white, and signal red. Rather than creating dissonance, these contrasts result in harmony. According to Dean Porter, in Eya in Peasant Blouse (1933) (where Nikolai Fechin deliberately chose an abstract background), one can sense the joy felt by the father painting “a young woman with sparkles in her eyes and a smile on her lips”. The 2007 book also includes a reproduction of another painting from the Taos period, Eya (also known as ia, 1928, oil on canvas, 47.5 × 37.5 cm, Taos Museum of Art at the Fechin House).

Eya in Peasant Blouse is simple in composition. The girl is depicted in a frontal view, leaning her arm on the back of a chair and slightly turning her head. She is wearing a light-colored blouse, and her hair is braided. She gazes thoughtfully at the viewer, and her body position conveys calmness. Dmitry Seryakov noted that Fechin emphasized the almond-shaped cut of the daughter's eyes, her slightly protruding chin, and clearly defined lips. Her hands are painted in one stroke, appearing relaxed and free. The canvas shows through the pastose strokes in some places. Seryakov emphasized that the painting gives the impression of having been created in one short session, although, according to Fechin's own recollections, it required many hours of hard work.

Eya was deeply affected by her parents' complicated relationship and divorce. The portraits created by her father after his separation from his wife, from the Californian period, show her growing up. The portrait Eya (also known as ia, mid-1930s) depicts a young woman with delicate facial features, which were carefully painted by Fechin. However, Dean Porter noted that as she aged, Eya lost her “‘attractiveness’”.

Eya continued to pose for Fechin occasionally until the late 1930s. Tuluzakova refers to the works from the Californian period: Eya Fechin (late 1930s, canvas, oil, 60 × 50 cm, collection of I. Fechin-Brenham, Taos, USA), Eya in Brown (canvas, oil, 60 × 50 cm, collection of I. Fechin-Brenham, Taos, USA), Eya in Brown (canvas, oil, 20 × 16 inches (51 × 41 cm), collection of Fechin-Brenham, Taos, USA), and Eya in Judo-Gi (canvas, oil, 65 × 50 cm, collection of Fechin-Brenham, Taos, USA).

Eventually, Nicolai Fechin stopped painting his daughter. Fechin explained this decision with two different reasons: in her words, “You are not as pretty as you used to be anymore” and “You have already lost your childishness, but haven't found your personality yet; your appearance does not yet show character”.

== Bibliography ==
- Воронков, С. Н. (1999). К вопросу о творчестве Николая Фешина. Дипломная работа, перераб. и исправл (PDF) (in Russian). СПб.: Санкт-Петербургский Академический институт живописи, скульптуры и архитектуры имени И. Е. Репина. p. 125.
- Галеев, И. И. (2004). Введение // Николай Фешин. 1881 / 1955. Живопись. Рисунок. Из собрания Государственного музея изобразительных искусств Республики Татарстан и частных коллекций. Москва, галерея «Арт-Диваж»: каталог / Вступ. статья И. И. Галеева, Г. П. Тулузаковой, А. Е. Кузнецова (in Russian). М.: Скорпион. pp. 5–17.
- Давтян, Л. (2012). Долгое возвращение Николая Фешина (in Russian). Иные берега: журнал. pp. 20–31.
- Дульский, П. М. (1921). Н. Фешин. (Библиотека иллюстрированных монографий отдела изобразительных искусств Казанского народного комиссариата по просвещению. Issue 1) (in Russian). Казань: Казанское отделение государственного издательства. p. 32.
- Капланова, С. Г. (1975). Творческий путь Н. И. Фешина // Николай Иванович Фешин. Документы, письма, воспоминания о художнике: сб. / Сост. и автор комментариев Г. Могильникова (in Russian). Л.: Художник РСФСР. pp. 7–20.
- Капланова, С. Г. (1964). Николай Иванович Фешин // Очерки по истории русского портрета конца XIX – начала XX века: сб. ст. / Под ред. Н. Г. Машковцева и Н. Т. Соколовой (in Russian). М.: Искусство. pp. 277–294.
- Кротова, Н. (1975). Воспоминания о Н. И. Фешине // Николай Иванович Фешин. Документы, письма, воспоминания о художнике: сб. / Сост. и автор комментариев Г. Могильникова (in Russian). Л.: Художник РСФСР. pp. 141–142.
- Николай Фешин. Каталог выставки произведений Н. И. Фешина в Государственном музее изобразительных искусств Республики Татарстан 22 ноября 2006 – 20 января 2007. Живопись. Графика. Скульптура. Декоративно-прикладное искусство (in Russian). Казань: Заман. 2006. p. 112. ISBN 5-89052-036-9
- Портер, Д. (2012). Николай Фешин – история двух стран // Альманах Государственного Русского музея (in Russian). Палаце Едитионс. pp. 19–37. ISBN 978-5-93332-406-5.
- Сайфутдинов, А. К. (2007). В гостях у Фешина. Беседу с художником вёл Ахат Мушинский // Казанский альманах (PDF) (in Russian). Альманах. pp. 212–219.
- Серяков, Д. Г. (2009). "III. 2. «Нон-финито» в портрете". Проблемы «нон-финито» в творчестве Николая Ивановича Фешина: диссертация на соискание учёной степени кандидата искусствоведения (in Russian). М.: Научно-исследовательский институт теории и истории изобразительных искусств Российской академии художеств. pp. 103–118.
- Тулузакова, Г. П. (2012). Николай Фешин в России // Альманах Государственного Русского музея (in Russian). Палаце Едитионс. pp. 9–18. ISBN 978-5-93332-406-5.
- Тулузакова, Г. П. (2014). Николай Фешин: портреты дочери Ии // Вторые Казанские искусствоведческие чтения: материалы Международной научно-практической конференции. К 130-летию со дня рождения Н. И. Фешина. Казань, 2–3 ноября 2011 г. / Министерство культуры Республики Татарстан, Государственный музей изобразительных искусств Республики Татарстан; редакц. коллегия: Р. М. Нургалеева, Д. Д. Хисамова, О. А. Хабриева: сб (in Russian). Казань. pp. 13–18. ISBN 978-5-93962-688-0.
- Тулузакова, Г. П. (2007). Николай Фешин. Русские художники. XX век. (in Russian). СПб.: Золотой век. p. 478. ISBN 978-5-342-00105-2.
- Тулузакова, Г. П. (2008). Лейкинд О. Л. (ed.). Роль У. С. Стиммела и казанского представительства A.R.A. в организации эмиграции Н. И. Фешина (по материалам архива наследников художника) // Изобразительное искусство, архитектура и искусствоведение Русского зарубежья (in Russian). pp. 159–167.
- Тулузакова, Г. П. (1998). Эволюция творчества Н. И. Фешина, 1881–1955 гг.: Основные проблемы: диссертация на соискание учёной степени кандидата искусствоведения (in Russian). СПб.: Санкт-Петербургский государственный академический институт живописи, скульптуры и архитектуры имени И. Е. Репина при Российской академии художеств. p. 221.
- Фешин, Н. И. (1975a). Письмо к брату Павлу. 3 мая 1954 года, Санта-Моника, Калифорния // Николай Иванович Фешин. Документы, письма, воспоминания о художнике: сб. / Сост. и автор комментариев Г. Могильникова (in Russian). Л.: Художник РСФСР. pp. 52–53.
- Фешин, Н. И. (1975b). Письмо к брату Павлу. 12 августа 1936 года, Лос-Анджелес, Калифорния // Николай Иванович Фешин. Документы, письма, воспоминания о художнике: сб. / Сост. и автор комментариев Г. Могильникова (in Russian). Л.: Художник РСФСР. pp. 47–48.
- Фешин, Н. И. (1975c). Письмо к брату Павлу. Июнь 1936 года, Лос-Анджелес, Калифорния // Николай Иванович Фешин. Документы, письма, воспоминания о художнике: сб. / Сост. и автор комментариев Г. Могильникова (in Russian). Л.: Художник РСФСР. pp. 45–46.
- Balcomb, M. (1975). Nicholai Fechin. Flagstaff, Ariz.: Northland Press, Arizona. p. 167. ISBN 0-87358-140-7
- Buer, F. (2010). Ein Leben mit J. L. Moreno. Impulse für die Zukunft. Ein Gespräch mit Grete Leutz (1992) // Psychodrama und Gesellschaft: Wege zur sozialen Erneuerung von unten (in German). Wiesbaden: Springer-Verlag. p. 379. ISBN 9-783-531-92369-7.
- Ertan, D. (2009). Dane Rudhyar: His Music, Thought, and Art. Eastman Studies in Music. Vol. 61. Rochester: University Rochester Press. p. 275. ISBN 978-1-58046-287-7.
- Fechin, A. (1937). March of the Past (PDF). Santa Fe, New Mexico: Writer's Editions (The Rydal Press). p. 164.
- Rudhyar, E. (1949). Fechin. Introduction to Eutonics: A Way of Attunement: an Experience in Self-discovery. Eutonics Series (Issue 1). Santa Fe, New Mexico: The Rydal Press. p. 13.
