= Konstantin Chebotaryov =

Russian painter

Portrait Konstantin Chebotaryov by A. Platunova

Konstantin Chebotaryov (Russian: Константи́н Чеботарёв; 1892–1974) was a Russian painter.

Chebotaryov was born in 1892 in a small village in present-day Bashkortostan, Russia. "Chebotar" is a Ukrainian word for "cobbler", but his father had risen in his family from peasant to land surveyor and eventually estate steward. Young Chebotaryov attended secondary school in Kazan. He began a self-published journal there in which he would present his writings. Chebotaryov entered the Kazan Art School in 1910, where he studied with Nicolai Fechin.

In the Canteen, 1932

While a student, Chebotaryov visited the Crimea in 1914, which is said to have inspired him greatly. His early paintings were a homage to Impressionism, but soon his work began to shift into the modern era.

In 1918, Chebotaryov created an art group called The Sunflower Union, which claimed to revolt against old art and embrace everything. The union held its first exhibition in Kazan. The exhibition, featuring 305 works, was a landmark in the development of Russian art. Out of these, fifty belonged to Chebotaryov, displaying elements of Cubism and Expressionism.

The Russian Civil War broke out and Chebotaryov was enlisted in the White Army. After being crushed by the Reds, Chebotaryov fled to the east, but eventually returned to Kazan in 1921. Chebotaryov resumed his work as an artist and teacher. He married another noteworthy artist, Alexandra Platunova. In the 1920s, an artistic almanac, The Rider, began to be published, and upon his return Chebotaryov actively contributed to it.

In 1923, Chebotaryov began to teach theater design and created settings for the numerous plays began performed in the artistically productive Kazan. In 1926, he moved to Moscow, when the transform to Socialist Realism began to take place and stifle the revolutionary avant-garde. He eventually ceased working for the stage.

Being braided as a bourgeois and reactionary for his art, and enemy of the people for his participation in the White Army, Chebotaryov met with hard times, bringing a fall from his position as leading artist in Kazan. He survived, however, though with a flattened reputation in Russia. His art was successful abroad and critics spoke of him highly in other countries. He tried but failed time and again to join the Moscow Artist's Union. Finally, in 1970, he was accepted to the Artists' Union, dying just four years later, impoverished and virtually unknown.
