= Kazan Art School =

Art school in Kazan, Russia

- Казанское художественное училище имени Н. И. Фешина
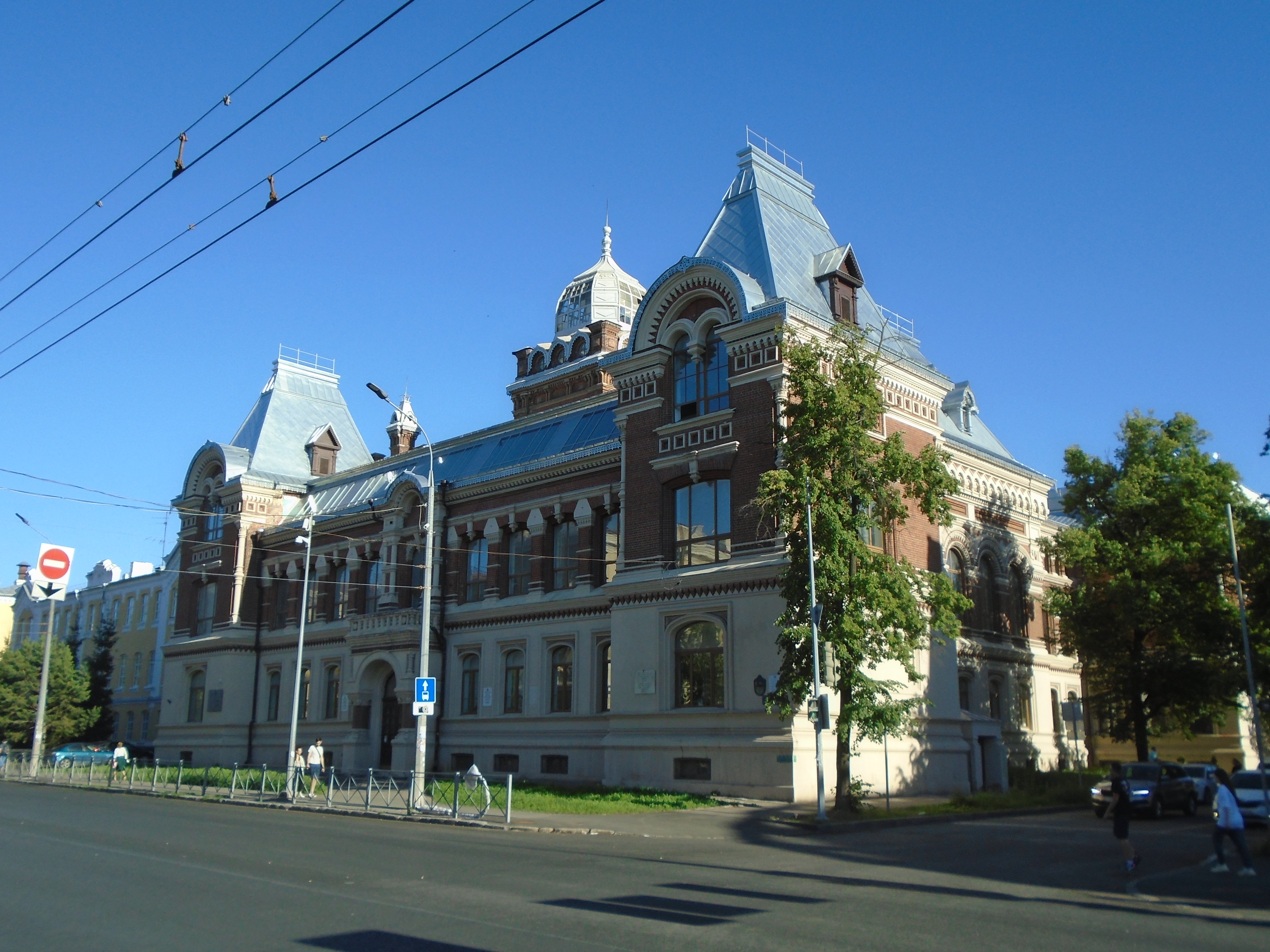
- Type: Public
- Established: September 9, 1895; 130 years ago
- Location: Kazan, Russia; 55°47′40″N 49°08′21″E
- Campus: Urban
- Website: kazanartschool.ru

The Kazan Art School (Russian: Казанское художественное училище) is a state autonomous education institution in Kazan, Republic of Tatarstan. It's one of the oldest art schools in Russia, with a continuous history of more than 100 years.

== History ==
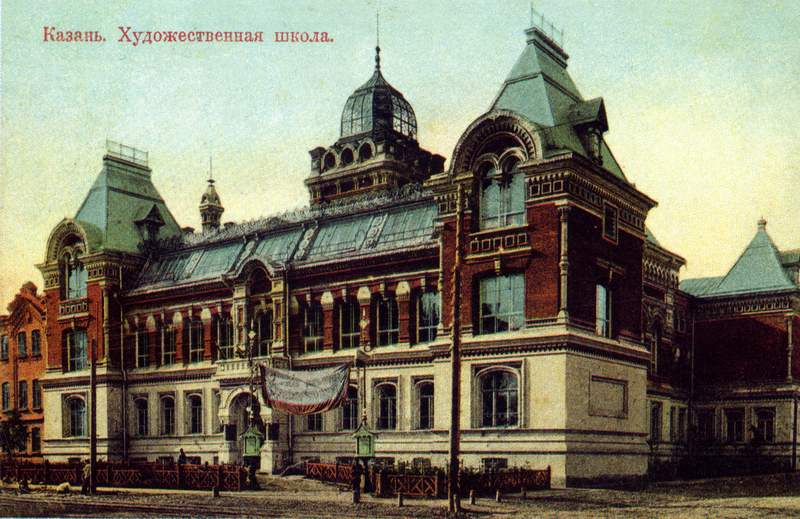
Kazan Art School building

The school was founded in 1895 as a branch of the Imperial Academy of Arts. In its early years, it had four departments: painting, engraving, architecture, and sculpture. Early graduates included P.P. Benkov, Alexander Grigoriev and Nicolai Fechin, for whom the school is now named.

In 1918 the Kazan Art School was transformed into Kazan Free Art Studios, then in 1921 because officially known as the Kazan Art and Technical Institute. In these years the school was the basis for a series of several Kazan artists groups: "The Sunflower" (1918) which combined the aesthetics of modernism to avant-garde trends; "Rider" (1920-1924) which announced the development of engraving as an independent art; "Tatar Left Front of Art" (TatLEF) (1923-1926); the "Declaration of Five" (1927); and the "Tatar Association of Artists of Revolutionary Russia "(TatAHRR) (1928), the regional branch of the national AKhRR socialist realism association.

The school remained open through the war years, and continues to provide arts education and training.
