= Mika Morozov =

1901 painting by Russian artist Valentin Serov

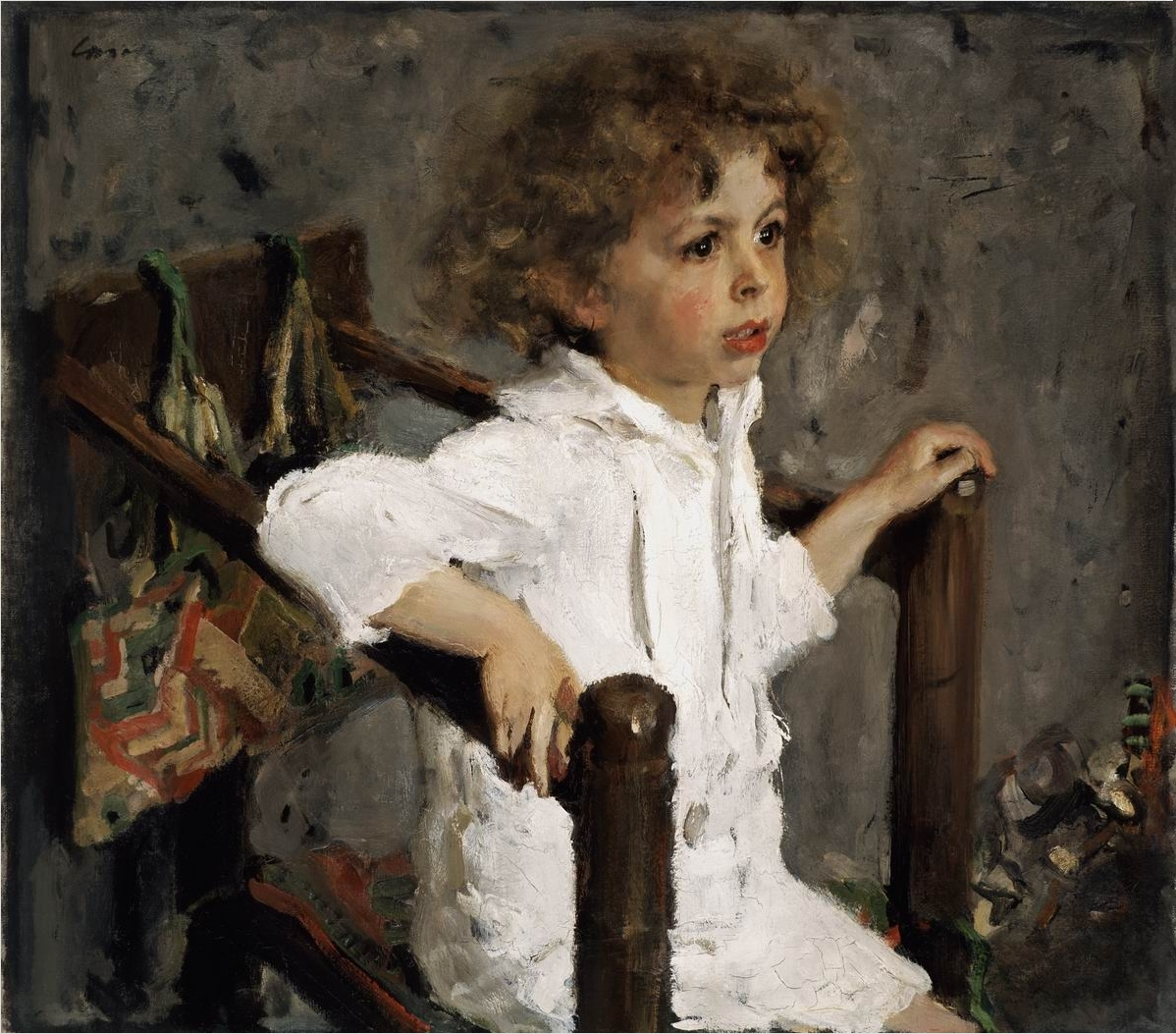
- Artist: Valentin Serov
- Year: 1901
- Medium: Oil on canvas
- Dimensions: 62,3 cm × 70,6 cm (245 in × 278 in)
- Location: Tretyakov Gallery, Moscow

Mika Morozov (in Russian: Мика Морозов; alternatively known as Portrait of Mika Morozov) is a painting by the Russian artist Valentin Serov. It was painted in 1901. For the artist at the age of four posed future Soviet literary scholar (specialist in the works of William Shakespeare), theater scholar, teacher, translator Mikhail Morozov, son of a major Russian businessman and philanthropist Mikhail Abramovich Morozov.

The painting forms part of the State Tretyakov Gallery collection's in Moscow, where it arrived in 1917. It has been repeatedly presented at national and international exhibitions. Among them are the exhibition In Russian Art Traditions held in 2004-2005 at the Smithsonian Institution in Washington, D.C. and an exhibition of works from the collection of the Morozov brothers at the Fondation Louis Vuitton in Paris in 2021-2022.

The art critic Paola Volkova in her book Bridge over the Abyss (2015) noted that the canvas reflects the view of the child characteristic of the second half of the 19th century — "sometimes the emotional or mental or inner world of a child is more significant than the world of an adult". The adult lives "in a socially defined world" — in a "false and closed" world. From the point of view of the artists of the time, complete openness is characteristic of children. However, she noted that from the second half of the 19th century artists "begin to deal only with the salvation of the world" and they are little interested in children. Therefore, Serov's treatment of the child in the portrait of Mika Morozov is "the least numerous and very quickly cut off", but at the same time "the deepest and most fruitful".

== Canvas representation ==
External image
- Chair from Abramtsevo in Serov's painting and in Galina Yuzefovich's apartment

The boy depicted in the painting (Note: It is often claimed that Mikhail Mikhailovich Morozov was five years old when he was portrayed in Valentin Serov's painting. In fact, he was only four. For example, the multivolume reference book Russian Writers (1999) quotes the above statement in an article by Vera Bokova, chief researcher of the Scientific-Exposition Department of the State Historical Museum, Doctor of Historical Sciences, and in the same article there are dates of birth and death of the artist's model, which indicate that Mika was actually one year less: "One of their sons (at the age of five, depicted in Serov's painting 'Mika Morozov') - M. M. Morozov (1897-1952), literary scholar, dramatist, translator, one of the prominent Soviet Shakespeare scholars".) is the third child in the family of the great industrialist, collector and patron of the arts Mikhail Abramovich and his wife — the mistress of the famous literary and musical salon of the time Margarita Kirillovna Morozova, the future Soviet literary scholar (specialist in the works of William Shakespeare), theatrical historian, teacher, translator Mikhail Mikhailovich Morozov (1897-1952). The boy jumps up from the chair in which he was sitting. The feeling of the impetuosity of his movements is intensified by the techniques of French Impressionism used by the artist. The child's fascination with the game, or something else that remains unknown to the viewer, is emphasized by "wide-open brown eyes, slightly parted crimson lips, and blush".

Mika's mouth is half open. The boy's big dark eyes are staring intently at something. The curly hair on his head is in a picturesque mess. He rests his hands on the armrests of the chair. The Soviet and Russian art historian Dmitry Sarabianov claimed that the boy's gesture and pose in the painting were so successfully chosen by the artist that "the character's emotions can be read like an open book. The curiosity with which he is seized causes him to stand up, stretch his neck, and tense up. In Sarabianov's words, he "seems to be the embodiment of a child's curiosity".

Yevgenia Korobkova, a candidate of philological sciences, said that the literary critic Galina Yuzefovich assumed that the intricately carved wooden child's chair from the Abramtsevo workshops, which stood in her house, could be the chair on which Mika Morozov is depicted in Valentin Serov's painting, or its "twin brother". It belonged to Yuzefovich's great-grandfather's sister, the artist Bella Casaroza. According to Yuzefovich, "theoretically" she could have met Serov.

== The painting in the works of Soviet artists ==
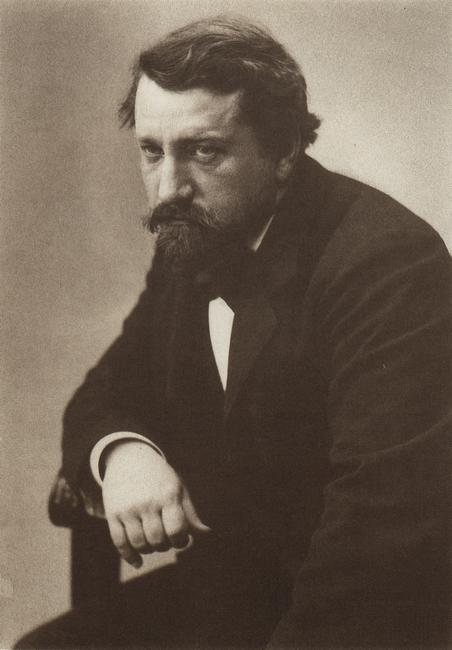
Valentin Serov during the 1900s; photograph

The painting was created by the Russian artist Valentin Serov in 1901. The technique in which the canvas is executed is oil painting on canvas. The size of the painting is 62.3 × 70.6 cm. Russian and Soviet artist Nina Simonovich-Yefimova claimed that the portrait was painted in Valentin Serov's rented apartment on Bolshoi Znamensky Lane in Moscow. This information is confirmed in the notes to the edition of her memoirs by the art historian Grigory Arbuzov. In the two-storey house of the Ulanov merchants, the artist occupied half of the upper floor above the owners' apartment. It was the favorite rented apartment of the Serov family, where they lived for at least ten years, until Ulanovy no longer needed the whole house that belonged to them and they did not require the artist to leave the apartment.

Mika's mother wrote in her memoirs that the boy's poor health in early childhood required serious attention from his parents. In the autumn the family went to the sea, in the summer they lived in the Tver province. The summer house was located on the bank of the river, surrounded by a pine forest. At the age of four, the boy spoke Russian and good English, was interested in astronomy, memorized the names of the planets and liked to repeat them. Often he would sit at the table in a high chair, quietly thinking about something. While studying Gustave Doré's illustrations of the Old Testament, Mika felt sorry for the devil and decided to pray for him. At night he would pray for his mother and father and then add, "Have mercy on the devil. At the age of five he began to learn to read and write. According to his mother's recollections, at that time Valentin Serov painted a portrait of the boy. He not only conveyed the features of Mika at that time, but also managed to emphasize "the main feature of his nature, his extraordinary liveliness, and that is why everyone found this portrait very similar to the adult Mikhail".

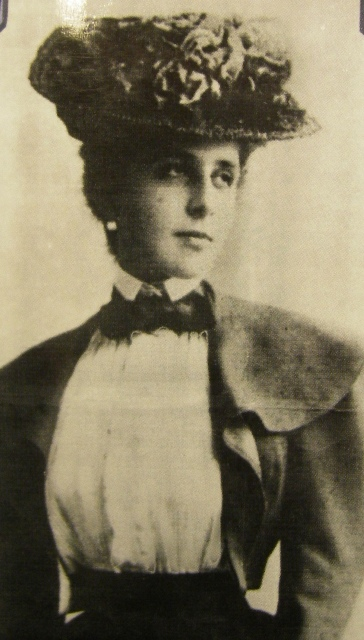
Margarita Kirillovna Morozova, 1890s

Mika Morozova's mother in her memoirs about the events connected with the creation of the portrait, comparing the author of the picture with Konstantin Korovin, noted Valentin Serov's lack of imagination and considered him "a true realist". She argued that the artist was characterized by "humorous pessimism about people" — in a person he saw a caricature, noting first of all his most characteristic internal and external features. According to her, Serov often saw man as an animal. According to Margarita Morozova, in his portraits one could rarely "feel a kind and simple attitude toward the person he was portraying", but "he always painted children particularly well". (Note: An overview of Valentin Serov's children's portraits is given in the article The Master of Children's Portraits by Honored Artist of Russia Suzanne Serova in the magazine of the Tretyakov Gallery.)

Margarita Morozova recalled that the artist was in a "very good and good-natured mood" during the creation of the painting. However, she herself was "a little afraid and embarrassed" by Serov, although she respected him and noted that she "liked" him as a person. Morozova wrote that at the time she did not want Serov to write her own portrait, as she believed that he disliked similar "ladies". After one of the sessions of posing with the boy, he "with a very significant and jokingly serious look" told his mother that he had heard of Mika's story of "daddy leopard" and "mammy leopard". The boy's story made the artist laugh.

Serov made several graphic portraits of the boy, as well as of Yura and Marusya four years after the portrait of Mika Morozov, the other two Morozov children. These graphic portraits were especially presented at the Salon exhibition in 1909.

Doctor of philology Natalia Ivanova quoted the testimony of Elizaveta Chernyak that in the apartment of the poet and writer Boris Pasternak at Volkhonka, 14 on the wall hung Valentin Serov's sketches for the painting Mika Morozov.

== Painting at exhibitions ==
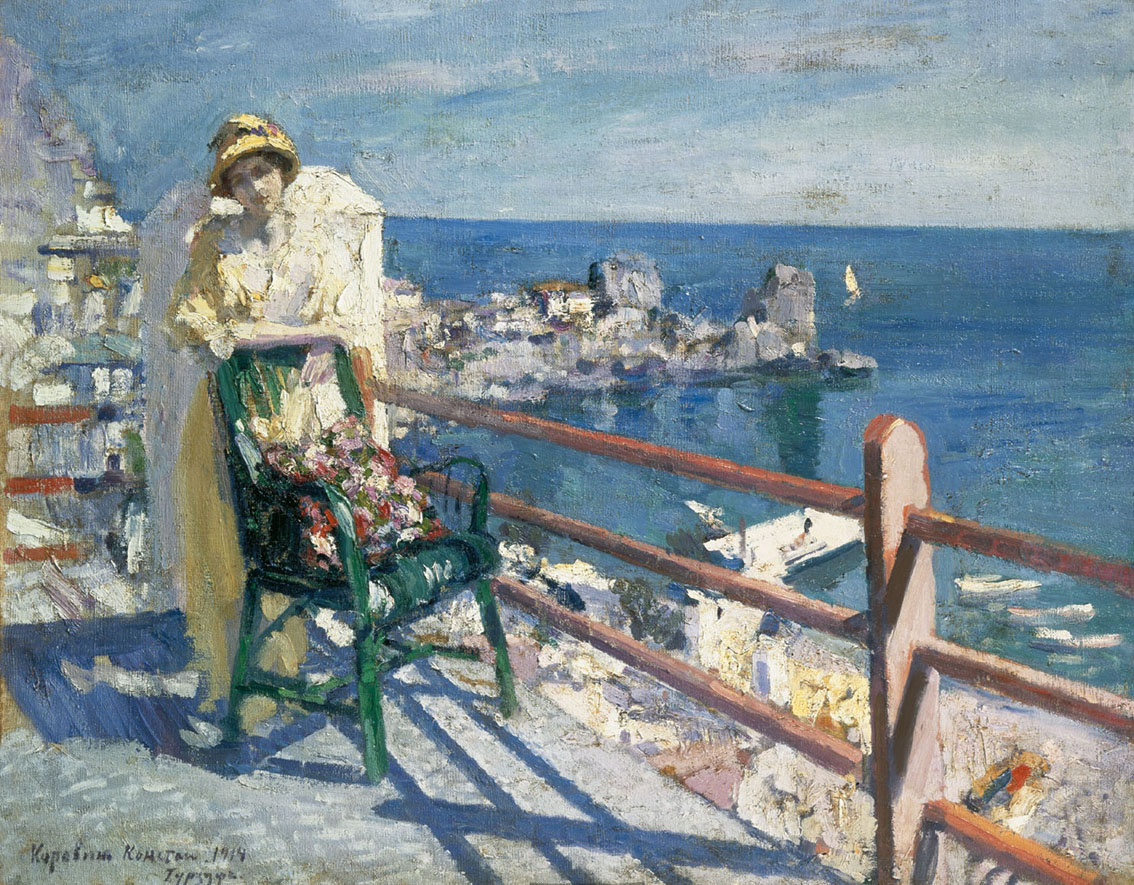
Konstantin Korovin. Gurzuf, 1914

For a long time, the painting was in the private collection of Mikhail and Margarita Morozov, the parents of the boy depicted in the painting. In 1917, the painting was transferred from Margarita Morozova's collection to the State Tretyakov Gallery, where it has remained to this day. (Note: The fate of the Morozovs' collection is discussed in detail by the candidate of historical sciences Vsevolod Volodarsky in his article The Morozovs' Art Collections in the Tretyakov Gallery.) Its inventory number in the museum's collection is 5325.

The painting was repeatedly presented at national and international exhibitions. Among them was the exhibition Mir Iskusstva (1902, St. Petersburg, at this exhibition Mika Morozov was shown under the title Portrait of a Child). The painting was exhibited at the personal posthumous exhibition of the artist's works in 1914 in Moscow and St. Petersburg, at the exhibition of Valentin Serov's works in Leningrad in 1935, at the exhibition in Warsaw in 1957, at the exhibition of the artist's works in Moscow and Leningrad in 1958-1960, at the exhibition dedicated to the works of Valentin Serov in Moscow and Leningrad in 1965, and in Tokyo and Kyoto in 1966-1967, at the exhibition in Leningrad in 1975, at the exhibition of the artist's works in Leningrad and Moscow in 1991, and in 1993 at the exhibition in the Japanese cities of Tokyo, Nara and Fukuoka; at the exhibition in Moscow in 1998 and in Helsinki in 2001.

The canvas was also shown at the exhibition In the Traditions of Russian Art at the Smithsonian Institution in Washington, D. C. in 2004-2005 and at the exhibition of works from the Morozov brothers' collection at the Louis Vuitton Foundation in Paris in 2021-2022. Art historian Sofia Bagdasarova, the author of an article in The Art Newspaper on the return of exhibits from the latter exhibition to Russia, noted separately: "'Portrait of Mika Morozov' by Valentin Serov has returned safely to the Tretyakov Gallery". A photo of experts examining the painting was published alongside.

== Painting in the of Soviet artists' works ==
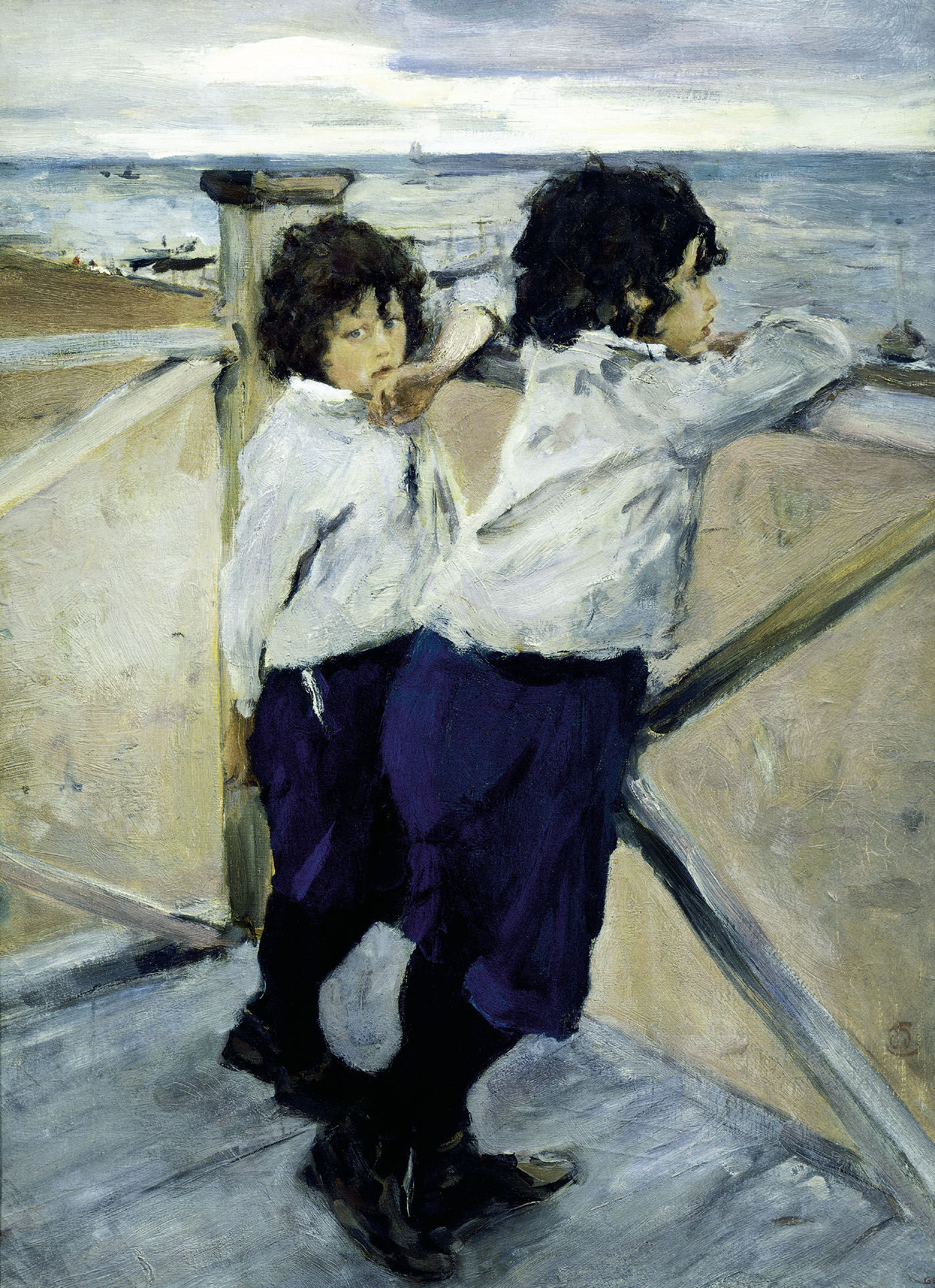
Valentin Serov. Children. Sasha and Yura Serov, 1899. State Russian Museum

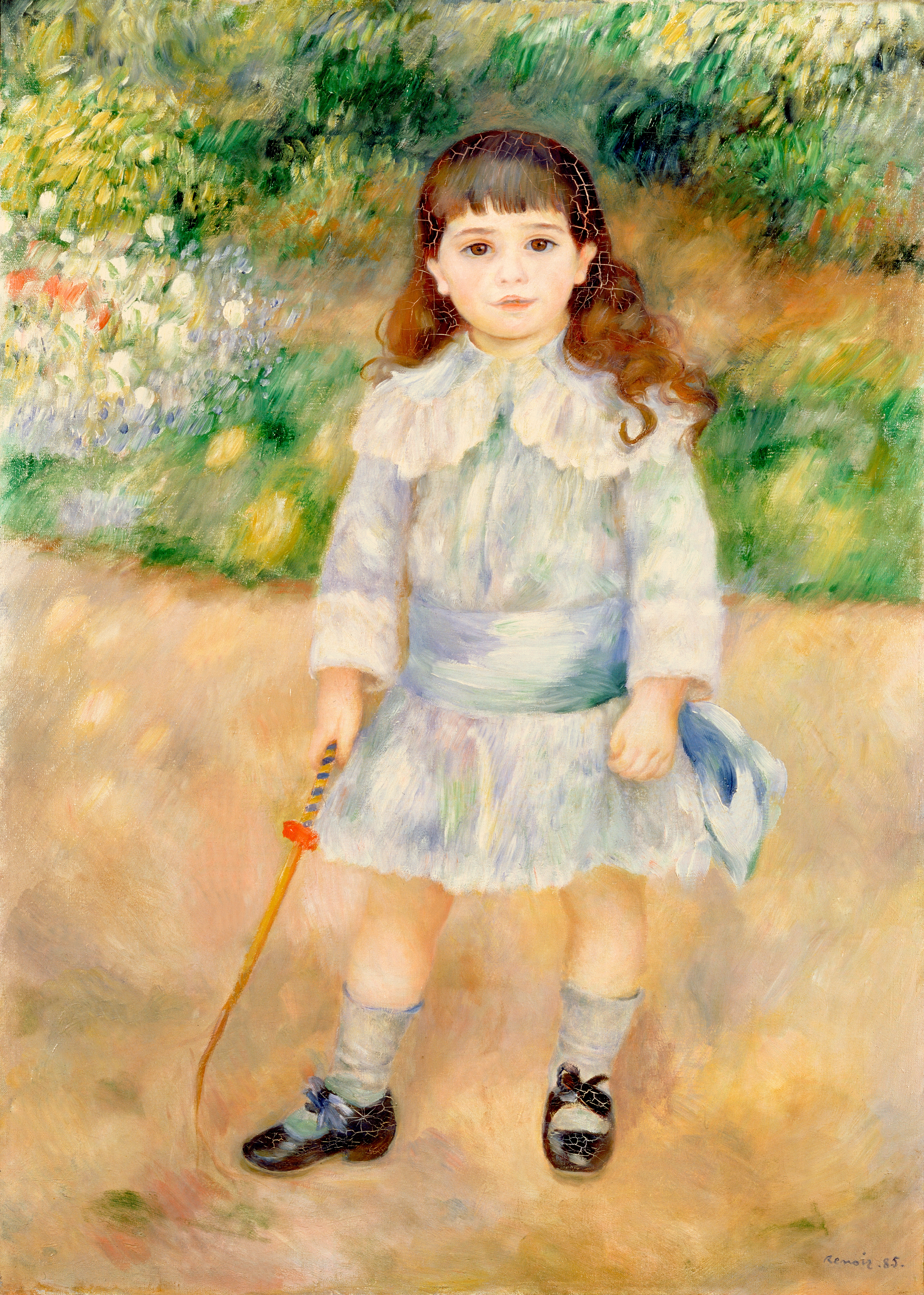
Pierre Auguste Renoir. A Child with a Whip, 1885. State Hermitage Museum

The Soviet art historian Georgy Lebedev noted Valentin Serov's sympathy for the Mir Iskusstva artistic society and its influence on the artist's work. In Serov's turn-of-the-century paintings, the memory of the old masters is expressed in the search for a single color leitmotif. Lebedev saw in it the influence of the cult of "silver scales" associated with the work of Konstantin Korovin. According to the art historian, this tendency was expressed in Serov's orientation "towards monuments of 'museum' painting, built on courage". To illustrate his statement, he cited the portrait of the artist's children, the portrait of Grand Duke Mikhail Nikolayevich, and especially the picture of Mika Morozov.

The artist's biographer Vera Smirnova-Rakitina, in a book published in 1961 in the series The Lives of Remarkable People, wrote about Valentin Serov's intolerant attitude towards "capitalists", but the portrait of Mika Morozov, in her opinion, was "the best portrait of a child... in all Russian painting". She wrote about this picture: "A lovely, curly-haired child with a delicate, spiritualized face, painted with such an expression, in such a hurry, that next to it all other portraits seem like motionless dolls. Although the portrait was painted in 1901, the biographer saw its similarity to the artist's earlier works, created in the era of "the search for color, en plein air, light". Smirnova-Rakitina argued that only two other paintings by Serov could be put on a par with this work: Portrait of a Son and Children.

Soviet art historian and biographer of Silver Age artists Mark Kopschitzer wrote about Valentin Serov's ability to turn commissioned works into real works of art. Among them he mentioned the portrait of Mika Morozov. In his opinion, Mika Morozov is "a thing absolutely exceptional in Russian, and perhaps in world painting. The image of the child is conveyed with realism and charm at the same time". According to him, among all painters, only the French impressionist Pierre-Auguste Renoir could compare with Serov in solving the task of conveying "the spiritual world of a child, so different from the spiritual world of an adult". Kopshitser himself admitted that Valentin Serov was better at this task than the French artist: "Mika Morozov is a more vivid child than the children in Renoir's portraits. Kopshitser quoted Anatoly Lunacharsky, who considered Renoir a "painter of happiness" and called Renoir's children "little human animals". Kopshitser wrote that he had seen visitors to the Tretyakov Gallery "almost galloping from hall to hall," but freezing in front of the painting Mika Morozov, "as if drawn by a magnet, and involuntarily a friendly smile appears on their faces".

Maria Knebel, a doctor of art history, said in her memoirs that Mika Morozov was one of her favorite childhood paintings. She was struck by the impetuosity of the boy portrayed by the artist, his excitement. She did not expect to find in Professor Mikhail Morozov a resemblance to Mika in Serov's painting, although she knew that it was the same person, but during her acquaintance with him she saw that in front of her "stood a tall, slightly heavy man, in whose eyes there was something strikingly reminiscent of the boy, rushing forward with impetuous energy". Knebel concluded that Serov had managed to capture the most characteristic in the boy, and this most essential was what Mikhail Morozov was able to carry through his life. Knebel's words were confirmed by the Soviet children's poet Samuil Marshak: "In spite of his large stature, we always recognized in him that greedy and intense look into the surrounding world of the child, 'Mikhail Morozov,' which was once so wonderfully depicted by the great Russian artist Valentin Serov".

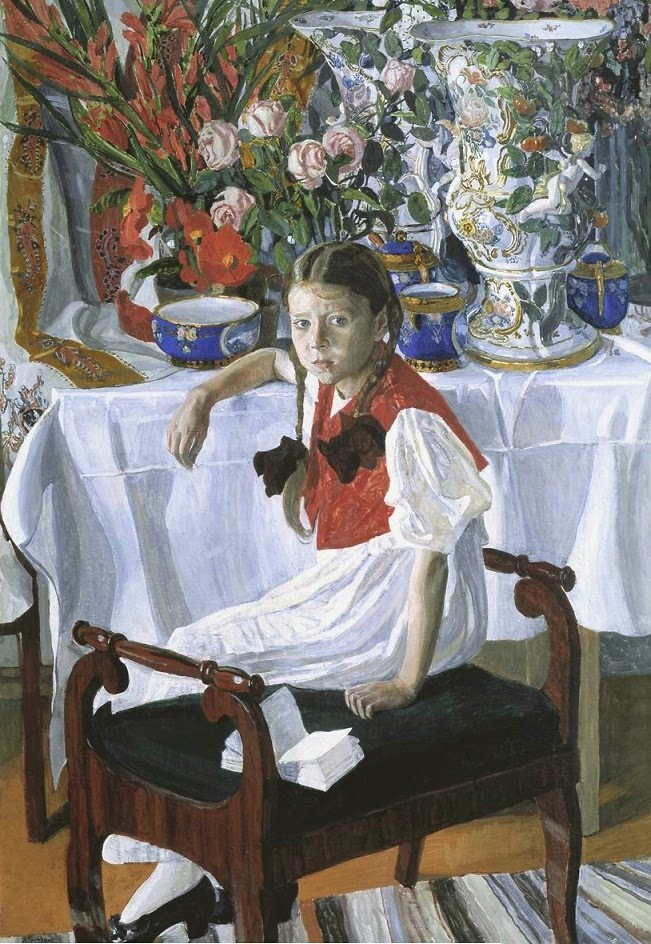
Alexander Golovin. Girl with porcelain, 1916. Tretyakov Gallery

The doctor of art history, the leading researcher of the Tretyakov Gallery, Ida Gofman, analyzing the painting Girl with Porcelain by Alexander Golovin, wrote about the vital simplicity and authenticity of the heroine's image. Her face is characterized by seriousness, "inner fullness", "soulful charm". At the same time, according to her, there is no joyful feeling of life in the picture, which is characteristic for the painting Mika Morozov. The world of expensive and beautiful objects does not bring her joy, it suppresses it.

The Soviet art historian Svyatoslav Belza wrote that visitors to the State Tretyakov Gallery usually linger for a while by Valentin Serov's portrait of Mika Morozov. He characterized it as depicting "a charming boy of about five years old" sitting in an armchair. Beltsa noted the "strikingly spiritualized expression of the child's face, in whose huge dark eyes there is both childlike surprise, enthusiasm, and not childlike seriousness, determination. The eyes of the boy portrayed by the artist the literary scholar called "the eyes of the soul", the soul of a generous and ardent man. He insisted that Mikhail Morozov kept this way of looking for the rest of his life.

The honored artist of the RSFSR Igor Dolgopolov wrote in his book Masters and Masterpieces (1987): "The curly-haired, disheveled, black-eyed child in a white nightgown with thin eyebrows saw something and froze, slightly raised on the chair. His hands are gripping the armrests. The child's mouth is slightly open, and the viewer can see "plump pink lips. He is surprised, but after a short time he may jump up to try to understand what he is interested in. Dolgopolov believed that the artist had managed to peer into the child's eyes and then vividly, inimitably reflect the real event.

Gennady Chugunov, a student of art history, claimed that Valentin Serov's portraits of children "were worse or better, but there are no unsuccessful ones among them. It was Serov who, better than other Russian artists of his time, was able to convey the inner essence of a child. For Chugunov, this portrait is remarkable for its "depth, penetration and surprising restraint of figurative solutions".

For Viktor Rosenwasser, a senior researcher at the State Tretyakov Gallery of the All-Union Museum Association, Mika Morozov is "the embodiment of a living child's joy". The art historian pointed out the diagonal construction of the composition and the contrast of the boy's white shirt with the dark foreground and background of the picture, as well as the subtlety of the depiction of Mika's emotional state: the details convey his excitement: the speed of his hands' movements, the burning look of his brown eyes, the open lips.

== Art historians about the painting ==
According to the official website of the Tretyakov Gallery, the portrait has become "one of the personifications of childhood in Russian art". It is close to the literary images of children created by Russian writers of the 19th and early 20th centuries: Sergei Aksakov, Vladimir Odoevsky, Antoni Pogorelsky, Leo Tolstoy, Nikolai Garin-Mikhailovsky, and Anton Chekhov. Like Valentin Serov, according to the author of the article, these writers were able to deeply understand "the essence of the child's soul".

Elena Racheyeva, an employee of the Pushkin State Museum of Fine Arts, emphasizes the boy's "fragile figure, disheveled head and burning eyes" in the painting. It is these details that make it possible to "feel the character traits of impetuous Mika and the world of his experiences". According to her, the artist abandoned expressive artistic means. In the painting "everything is restrained: composition, coloring".

Dmitry Sarabianov, Doctor of Art History, Corresponding Member of the Russian Academy of Arts, in his monograph on Serov's work, published in English, noted that Mika Morozov's activity should be accompanied by a spatial environment that allows the figure to continue its movement in the viewer's imagination. The pictorial surface of the canvas expands, absorbing the figure of the boy with a whole system of surrounding objects and combining them into a balanced composition. The movement allows the artist to completely cover the event and give it monumentality. Sarabianov wrote: "The merits [of the painting] lie not in the spectacular or in the bright colors, but in the fleetingness that can only be achieved by great talent, a sharp and very sensitive eye".

Russian art historian, honored art worker of the RSFSR Paola Volkova in her book A Bridge over the Abyss (2015) compared the depiction of a child in different periods. In the 16th and 17th centuries, children were depicted as adults. In the 18th century, painters already marked "a certain age stage," and the second half of the 19th century, according to Volkova, is characterized by another "new color" — "sometimes the emotional or mental or inner world of a child is more significant than that of an adult". The adult lives "in a socially defined world" — in a "false and closed" world. Volkova cites the painting Mika Morozov as an example of this.

An image is "not just an emotionally or spiritually complete state, it is an overflowing world. And the child exists in this world autonomously. Volkova describes this boy's independence on the canvas as mysterious. She noted that from the second half of the 19th century, artists "begin to deal only with the salvation of the world", they are little interested in children. Therefore, Serov's way of work with the child in the portrait of Mika Morozov is "the most sparse and very quickly cut off", but at the same time and "the deepest, most fruitful". Volkova quoted an episode from some memoirs, without naming their author, in which an unnamed woman attends a lecture by Mikhail Morozov on the works of William Shakespeare. Suddenly, "a bolt of lightning flashed through her mind" — she recognized the lecturer in Serov's painting of the boy: "He has not changed, he has just become a very grown-up man. He got a belly, but his cheeks remained the same, and his nose was the same, and his mouth was the same. And his whole attitude to life hasn't changed at all".

Paola Volkova wrote that Serov saw in a person the unchangeable and manifest features of his personality. The artist knew Mika Morozov for many years and, according to the author of the book, could have painted his portrait "20,000 times", but he did it only once. The art historian described the character of the painting as "restless, impetuous, embraced by all the stigmas of a man's life, endlessly continuous, charged with a special kind of excitement of understanding, with an inner spiritual focus". Volkova particularly emphasized the boy's extroversion, dynamism, "second ability to change" and versatility. Paola Volkova concluded: "Personality as such in its basic features is formed much earlier [than assumed by educators]. But art hardly solves this problem, and Serov, who had this vision as a gift, as a talent, solves it".

Maria Drozdova-Chernovolenko, an English translator and memoirist, one of the leaders of the Russian Theosophical Society, wrote that Mikhail Morozov did not publicly identify himself with the character in Valentin Serov's painting, but students easily identified them: "His physical appearance: huge eyes and expressive crimson cherry lips were the same as those of the four-year-old child in the white shirt in the famous painting. The memoirist recalled that after graduation Morozov's former students agreed among themselves and a whole group came to the Tretyakov Gallery to see his portrait by Serov.

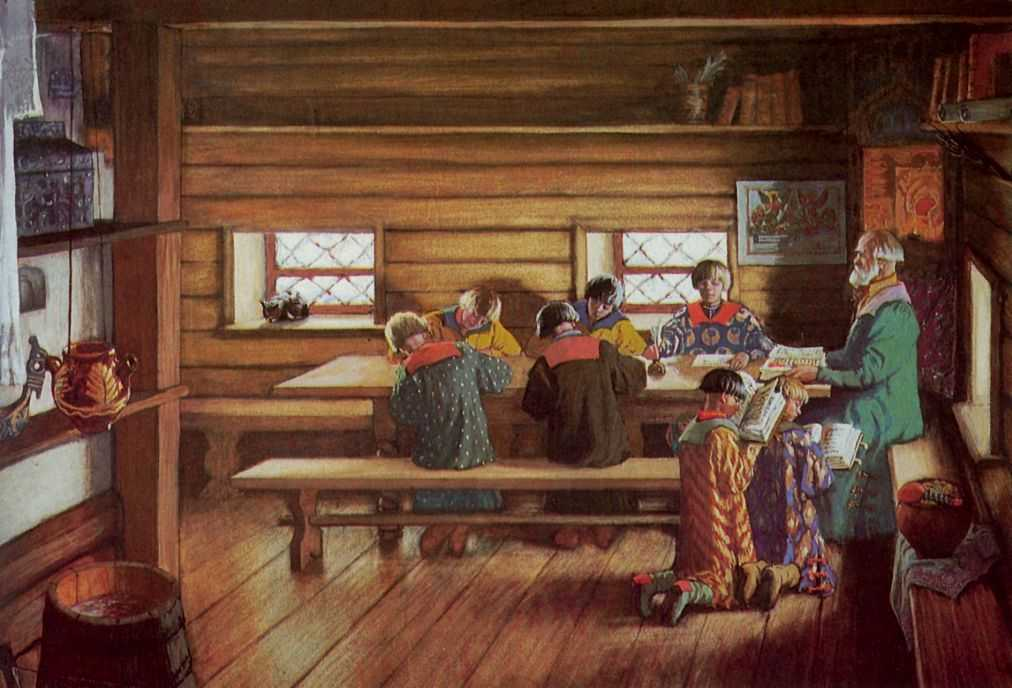
Boris Kustodiev. Paintings on Russian history. School in the Principality of Moscow, 1908

The candidate of pedagogical sciences Svetlana Ganina in her article The phenomenon of childhood in Russian culture of the 19th - early 20th century: cultural and philosophical analysis of Russian painting (2012) noted in Serov's painting "freshness of discovery of the world" by a child, and the cult of childhood is considered one of the most important lines of the artist's work. Valentin Serov convincingly depicts the "emotionality, immediacy and impetuosity of the inner world of the child", who is open to the world around him and perceives it "with absolute and inordinate joy". The theme of the portrait, according to Ganina, is "the happy time of childhood ... the joy of wonder at the marvelous invisible world. The author of the article concluded: "Mika is happy in his ignorance of the essence of life..."

Ganina compared Serov's approach to the child with that of the Mir Iskussta artists. In her opinion, many artists of this society, unlike Serov, tried to "fix playful, brightly theatrical, openly costumed features". As an example, she cited Boris Kustodiev's representation of children in masquerade costumes. The reasons for Valentin Serov's close attention to the theme of childhood, Ganina suggested, can be found in the artist's own "wandering" childhood.

The Czechoslovak art historian Vladimir Fiala compared two of Serov's paintings devoted to children: Children. Sasha and Yura Serov and Mika Morozov. He thought that the second painting better captured "the charm of the moment and childlike spontaneity: "On a gray background on the edge of the chair at the very edge of the boy in a white shirt with a playful and playful face and burning eyes. He clings to the armrests, "ready at any moment to jump up and continue the game. He described both works as intimate portraits. They are made with "sensitivity, with a clearly expressed love for people. Fiala noted the delicacy of the painting and the pastel character of the image, giving it a poetic quality that is lacking in almost all commissioned ceremonial portraits.

== Painting in culture ==
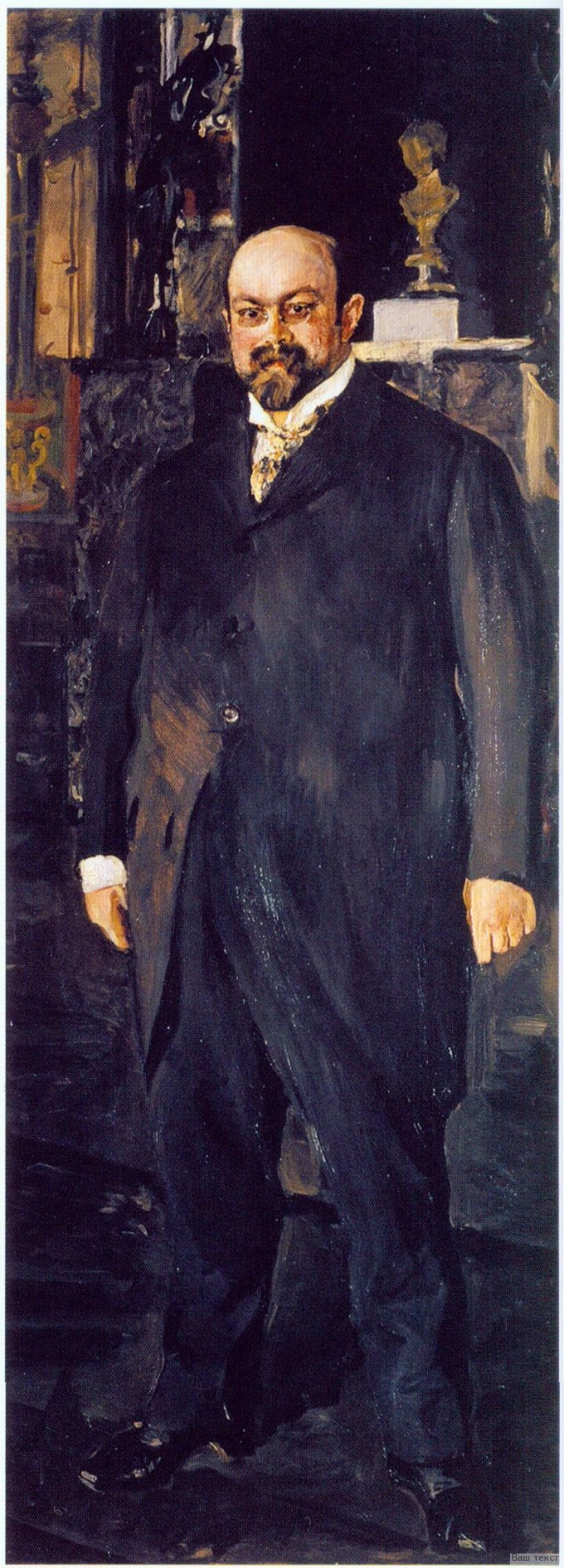
Valentin Serov, Mikhail Morozov, 1902; Tretyakov Gallery

The leading researcher of the Russian State Library Elena Yaroshenko (she writes under the pseudonym Elena Khorvatova) in her documentary-publicist book Margarita Morozova. Sinful Love (2004) states that in 1901-1902 Serov had to paint a whole series of portraits of the Morozov family according to the order he received. Analyzing the portrait of Mika Morozov, she writes about the image of a "curly-haired boy with surprisingly open, naive eyes and touching thin fingers, frozen on the armrests of an antique armchair". In particular, Yaroshenko notes that this is not a ceremonial portrait, but one that "conveys the immediacy of the child's character and experiences". The painting quickly became very popular. If other portraits of Valentin Serov caused controversy, this one was enthusiastically received by all art critics.

Yaroshenko called the portrait of Mika Morozov "a standard of perfection" and "a masterpiece of child portraiture", but noted that Serov himself, when it came to talking about this painting of his, was brief: "Nothing special, something came out". Portrait of Mika Morozov, the author of the book contrasted the portrait of his father, also painted by Serov, but already in 1902. Mikhail Abramovich expected a "parade, 'imperial level' image", but received a completely different picture. When the picture was presented at the exhibition of the Mir Iskusstva Art Society, among its assessments were: "A scarecrow, a boar, jumped at the hunter and stopped with a run" and "Cast-iron man, a monument to big capital". Morozov was ready to make a public scandal, but his wife persuaded him "not to make a fool of himself in front of Moscow bohemia. The portrait was hung in a place of honor in the Morozov house. The artist received five times less money than usually paid for ceremonial portraits, new orders for portraits of children and on the canvas depicting Margarita Morozova did not follow. Yaroshenko claimed that the factory worker began to suspect his wife in a special relationship with Serov, so the artist was able to write her portrait only in 1911 (8 years after the death of her husband).

The fortieth episode of the television program Tretyakov Gallery. The Story of a Masterpiece was about Valentin Serov's painting Mika Morozov. The documentary was directed by Vladimir Venediktov, the winner of the State Prize of the Russian Federation in the field of art and literature, and the author of the script was Olga Sarnova.

Dr. William Smith in his book After Serov's Exhibition. Portraits, Fates, History... he devoted a separate chapter to the portrait of Mika Morozov. The reason for the creation of the picture, he calls the insight of the artist, who saw the boy who suddenly ran into the room. Smith claimed that Serov needed only three sessions of posing for half an hour each to create the portrait. The author of the book called the peculiarity of the portrait the absence of the boy's past, and the future of the heir to a great fortune was then imagined as "a book with snow-white pages". The boy invented the fantastic land of Lebercalia, about which he told the artist. Its inhabitants were warriors and hunters, often celebrated festivals, characterized by courage and generosity.

William Smith thought that the charm of the portrait was connected with the artist's personal "nostalgic motives". Serov recalled that, like Mika Morozov, he himself looked at life in childhood, which seemed to him at the time like a miracle. "In the image of Mika he wanted to convey that very "joyful" that happens in childhood almost everyone and that then blurred, broken, to finally disappear without a trace in a boring adult", — explained Smith. He noted that Serov himself praised his work.

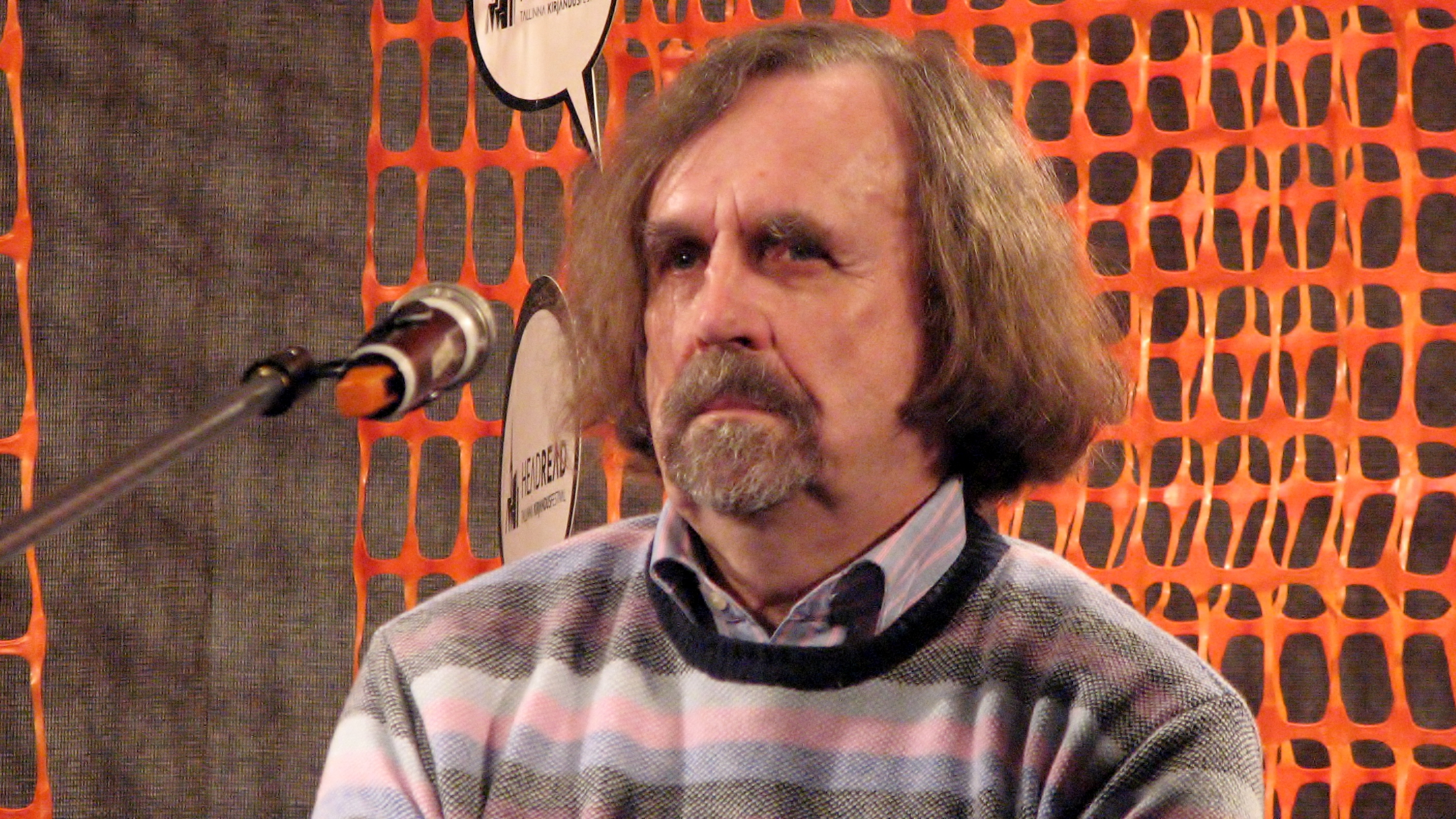
Rein Põder in 2012

Estonian writer Rein Põder published the story Premonition, translated into Russian for the Tallinn magazine Vyshgorod. Four-year-old Mika Morozov, barefoot in a fluttering nightgown and with a book under his arm, runs into a room where Anton, an artist unknown to the boy (named Valentin Serov in the story), is talking to his mother. The guest decides to paint a portrait of Mika. First the boy poses, standing on the threshold with a book in his hands. Then the artist places him in a chair and tries to keep him in place by drawing him into conversation. Finally, he decides that the boy, sitting in the chair, should prepare to jump up.

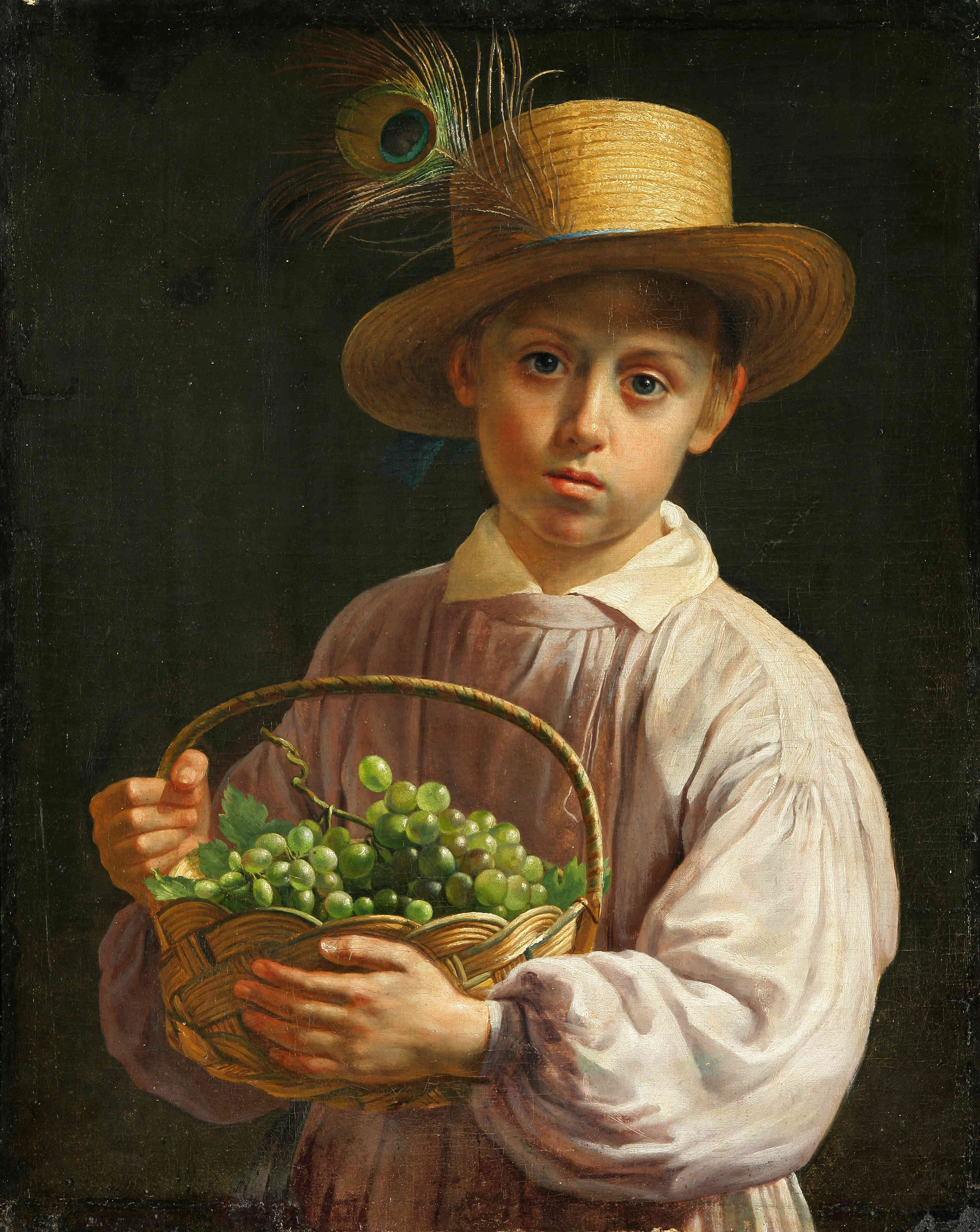
Jan Chrucki. Portrait of a Boy in a Straw Hat, late 1830s-early 1840s. The National Art Museum of the Republic of Belarus

While working on the portrait, the artist became convinced that the boy had amazing talents: he already spoke English, was interested in astronomy, and could write. Work on the portrait continued for two weeks. The boy tells Anton about the country of Lebercalia, which he has invented. Standing in front of the finished portrait, the artist is convinced that the boy in it reminds him of himself in childhood. Mika lives a long life and all the time remains the same boy from the portrait in which he is depicted at the age of four.

== Painting in pedagogy and methodology of teaching fine arts and Russian language ==
Mika Morozov's painting, together with other children's portraits, has been repeatedly used as didactic material in Russian language and fine arts classes at various levels of education in Russia and Belarus.

Candidate of pedagogical sciences Lubov Voroshnina suggests using the paintings Mika Morozov and Girl with peaches for language teaching among preschoolers, analyzing colors, poses and settings, accompanied by the music of Tchaikovsky. Doctor of philology Tatyana Ignatovich and colleagues offer schoolchildren to determine the differences and similarities of portraits based on the analysis of the paintings Mika Morozov and Portrait of a Boy with a Straw Hat and to write a dictation. Irina Yatsenko and Tatyana Sitnikova in the handbook for the 4th grade offer a method of composing on the painting Mika Morozov, which is included in the school textbook. Doctor of philology Maria Kalenchuk and her colleagues use the painting Mika Morozov for an oral essay, asking students questions about the boy's age and appearance.

Evgeny Krasnushkin advises teachers to compare Mika Morozov with Kramskoi's painting Beekeeper, noting the naturalness of the movements and paying attention to the technique of Serov's brushstrokes. At the end of the lesson, Krasnushkin suggests that the children repeat Mika's pose and compare it with other portraits to see the difference in the approach to portraying the characters.

Paintings by Russian artists, which Eugene Krasnushkin suggests comparing in class with the painting Mika Morozov

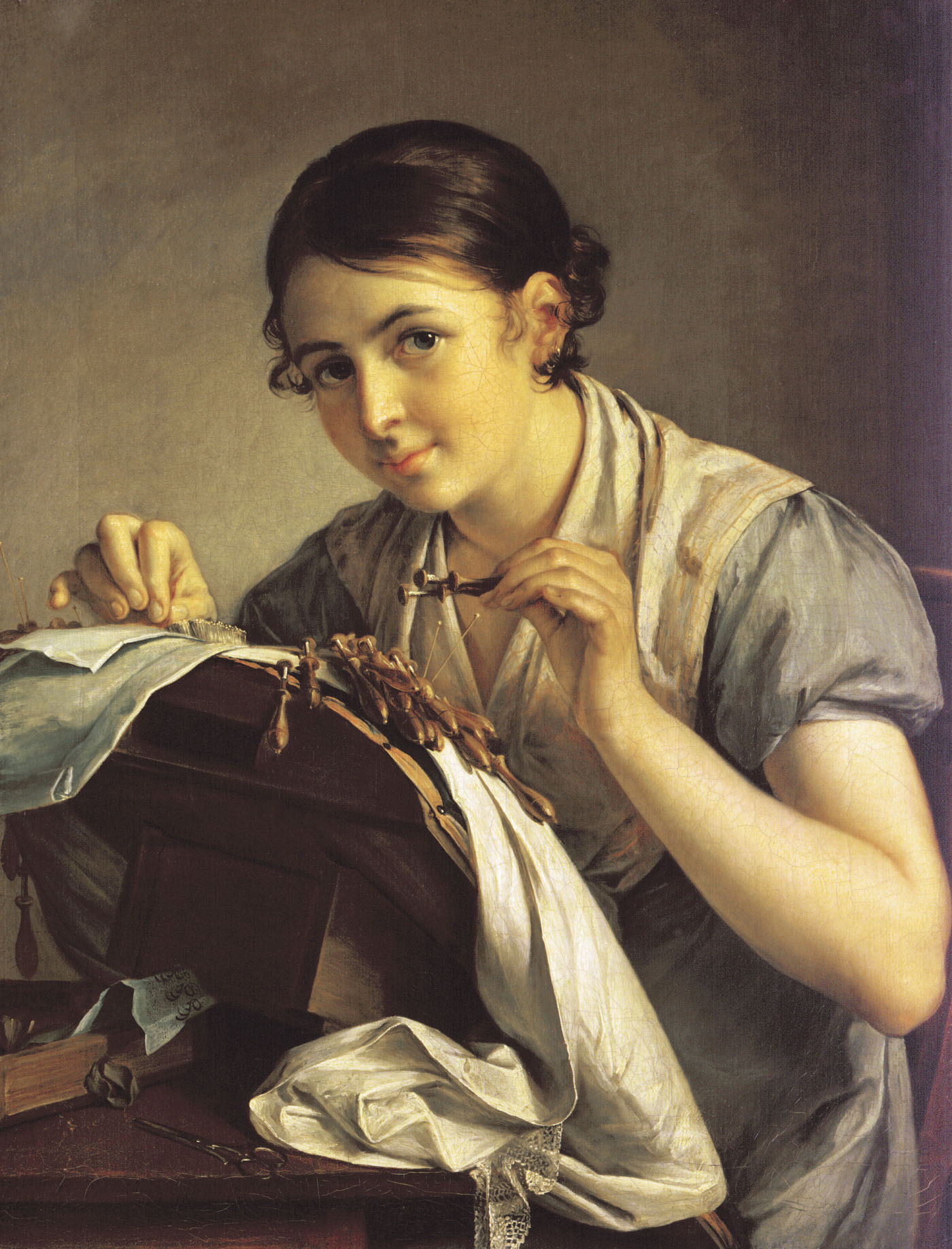
Vasily Tropinin. A Lacemaker, 1823. Tretyakov Gallery

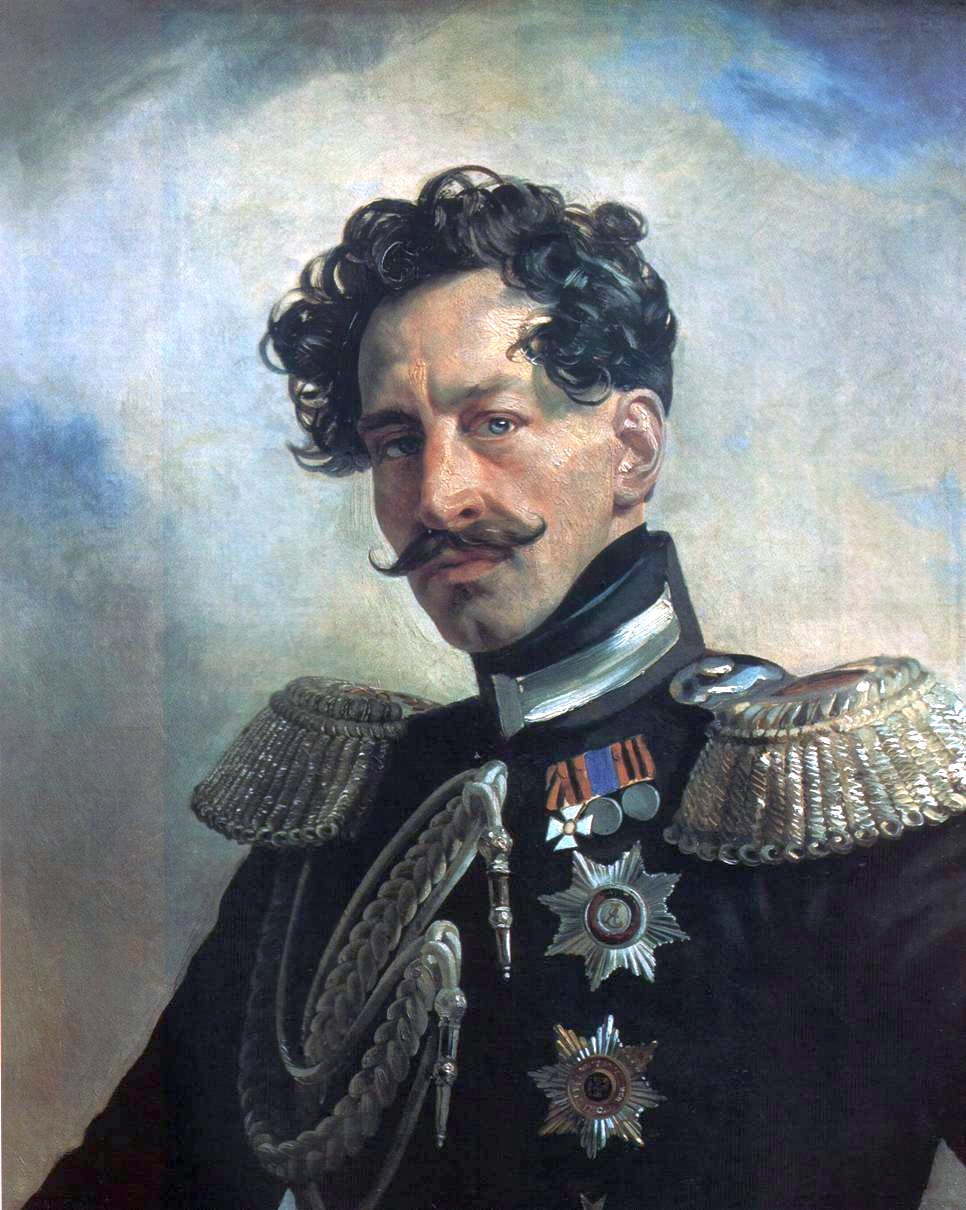
Karl Bryullov. Portrait of Adjutant General Count Vasily Perovsky, 1837. Tretyakov Gallery

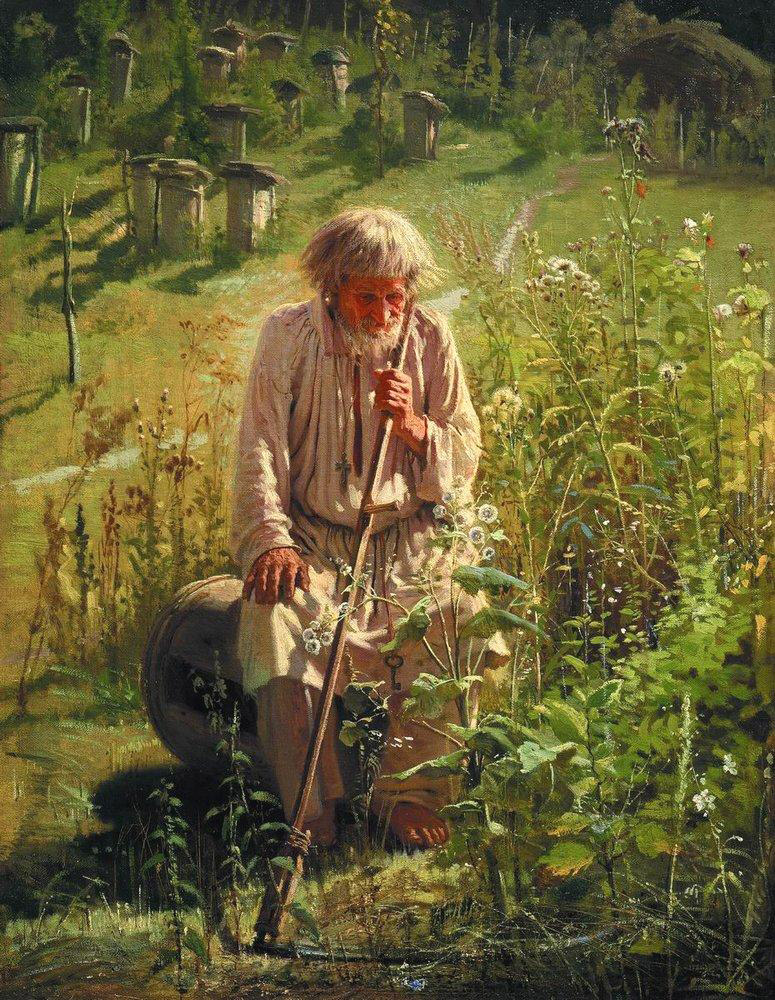
Ivan Kramskoy. A Beekeeper, 1872. Tretyakov Gallery

== Bibliography ==
=== Sources ===
- Drozdova-Chernovolenko, M. F. (2011). Мика Морозов: оживший портрет эпохи // Шекспировские чтения. Отв. ред., сост. И. С. Приходько: Журнал [Mika Morozov: a revived portrait of the epoch // Shakespeare Readings] (in Russian). Vol. «Шекспировские чтения» 2006. Наука. pp. 363–367. ISBN 978-5-0203-7388-4.
- Knebel, M. O. (1967). «Верьте Шекспиру» // Морозов М. М. Шекспир, Бёрнс, Шоу… / Авт. вступ. статьи, сост. и ред. Ю. Шведов [“Believe Shakespeare” // Morozov M. M. Shakespeare, Burns, Shaw...] (in Russian). М.: Искусство. p. 328.
- Marshak, S. Ya. (1967). Памяти М. М. Морозова // Морозов М. М. Шекспир, Бёрнс, Шоу… / Авт. вступ. статьи, сост. и ред. Ю. Шведов (in Russian). М.: Искусство. p. 328.
- Morozova, M. K. (1967). О моём сыне // Морозов М. М. Шекспир, Бёрнс, Шоу… / Авт. вступ. статьи, сост. и ред. Ю. Шведов [About my son // Morozov M. M. Shakespeare, Burns, Shaw] (in Russian). М.: Искусство. p. 328.
- Morozova, M. K. (1991). Мои воспоминания / Публикация Е. М. Буромской-Морозовой. Примечания Д. М. Евсеева, Н. Семёнова [My Memoirs / Published by E. M. Buromskaya-Morozova. Notes by D. M. Evseev, N. Semenov] (in Russian). Наше наследие: Журнал. — Советский фонд культуры. pp. 89–110.
- Simonovich-Yefimova, N. Ya. (1964). Москва (1902—1909 годы) // Воспоминания о Валентине Александровиче Серове. Общая редакция, примечания и именной указатель Г. С. Арбузова [Moscow (1902-1909) // Memories of Valentin Aleksandrovich Serov. General editing, notes and name index by G. S. Arbuzov] (in Russian). Л.: Художник РСФСР. pp. 81–114.

=== Non-fiction and researches ===
- Bagdasarova, S. A. (5 May 2022). Коллекция Морозовых наконец вернулась в Россию [The Morozov collection has finally returned to Russia] (in Russian). The Art Newspaper: Ежемесячная газета.
- Volodarsky, V. M. (1998). Художественные коллекции Морозовых в Третьяковской галерее [Morozovs' Art Collections in the Tretyakov Gallery] (in Russian). Морозовские чтения: Журнал. — Богородский печатник.
- Bokova, V. M. (1999). Морозов Михаил Абрамович // Русские писатели. 1800—1917: Биографический словарь / Гл. ред. П. А. Николаев [Morozov Mikhail Abramovich // Russian Writers. 1800-1917: Biographical Dictionary]. Русские писатели 11—20 вв. (in Russian). Vol. 4. М—П. М.: Большая российская энциклопедия, Научно-внедренческое предприятие ФИАНИТ. pp. 133–134. ISBN 5-8527-0256-0
- Belza, S. I. (1984). Вдохновенный друг Шекспира // Морозов М. М. Театр Шекспира (Сост. Е. М. Буромская-Морозова; Общ. ред. и вступ. статья С. И. Бэлзы) [Inspirational friend of Shakespeare // Morozov M. M. Shakespeare's Theater] (in Russian). М.: Всероссийское театральное общество. p. 304.
- Volkova, P. D. (2015). "IX. Век XIX. Социальный допинг для общества". Мост через бездну [Bridge over the abyss] (in Russian). Vol. 3. М.: Зе6ра Е. pp. 207–222. ISBN 978-5-9063-3966-9.
- Ganina, S. A. (2012). Феномен детства в русской культуре XIX — начала XX в.: культурно-философский анализ русской живописи [The phenomenon of childhood in Russian culture of the XIX - early XX century: cultural and philosophical analysis of Russian painting // Values and meanings] (in Russian). Ценности и смыслы: Журнал. pp. 138–149.
- Hofman, I. M. (1978). Головин-портретист [Golovin the portraitist] (in Russian). Л.: Художник РСФСР. p. 163.
- Hofman, I. M. (2014). Классик Серебряного века // Александр Головин. К 150-летию со дня рождения [Classic of the Silver Age // Alexander Golovin. To the 150th anniversary of his birth] (in Russian). М.: Государственная Третьяковская галерея. pp. 12–40. ISBN 978-5-89580-050-8.
- Dolgopolov, I. V. (1987). «Жизнь есть тайна» // Мастера и шедевры. В 3-х томах [“Life is a mystery” // Masters and masterpieces. In 3 volumes] (in Russian). Vol. 2. М.: Изобразительное искусство. pp. 725–734.
- Ivanova, N. B. (2007). Среда обитания // Борис Пастернак. Времена жизни [Habitat // Boris Pasternak. Seasons of Life]. Диалог (in Russian). М.: Время. pp. 24–29. ISBN 978-5-9411-7170-5.
- Kopshitser, M. I. (1972). "5". Валентин Серов. Изд. 2-е [Valentin Servo, 2nd edition]. Жизнь в искусстве (in Russian). М.: Искусство. pp. 150–237.
- Korobkova, E. S. (2017). Карандаш Ахматовой и кружка Набокова пойдут с молотка на аукционе «Литфонда» [Akhmatova's pencil and Nabokov's mug will go under the hammer at the Litfond auction] (in Russian). Комсомольская правда: Газета. — АО ИД «Комсомольская правда».
- Lebedev, G. Е. (1946). Валентин Серов [Valentin Serov]. Мастера русского искусства (in Russian). М.—Л.: Искусство. p. 51.
- Morozov A. P., Aleksandrova N. (2005). В традициях русского искусства. Историческая коллекция русской живописи XX века [In the traditions of Russian art. Historical collection of Russian painting of the 20th century] (in Russian). Третьяковская галерея: Журнал. — Фонд «Развитие народного творчества «ГРАНИ».
- Racheeva, E. P. Зрелость (2005). Серов [Serov]. Галерея гениев (in Russian). М.: ОЛМА-ПРЕСС Образование. pp. 30–57. ISBN 5-94849-807-7
- Rosenwasser, V. B. (1990). Кабала портретиста // Валентин Серов (К 125-летию со дня рождения) [The Portraitist's Cabal // Valentin Serov (On the 125th anniversary of his birth)]. Новое в жизни, науке, технике. Серия «Искусство» (in Russian). Vol. 5. М.: Знание. pp. 14–24. ISBN 5-0700-0589-8
- Serova, S. P. (2015). Мастер детского портрета [The master of children's portraiture] (in Russian). Третьяковская галерея: Журнал. — Фонд «Развитие народного творчества «ГРАНИ». ISSN 1729-7621.
- Smirnova-Rakitina, V. A. (1961). "XVII. Daily life". Валентин Серов [Valentin Serov]. Жизнь замечательных людей (in Russian). М.: Молодая гвардия. pp. 279–289.
- Chugunov, G. I. (1990). "V. «Мир искусства» и мирискусники". Валентин Серов в Петербурге [Valentin Serov in St. Petersburg]. Выдающиеся деятели науки и культуры в Петербурге — Петрограде — Ленинграде (in Russian). Л.: Лениздат. pp. 83–120. ISBN 5-2890-0607-9
- Fiala, V. (1960). Serov [Serov]. (Knižnica výtvarného umenia) (in Serbian) (Bratislava ed.). Slovenské vyd-vo krásnej lit. p. 124.
- Sarabianov, D. V. (2012). Valentin Serov. Best of. New York: Parkstone International. p. 200. ISBN 978-1-7804-2747-8.

=== Catalog ===
- 1217. Мика Морозов. 1905 // Государственная Третьяковская галерея. Каталог собрания. Живопись [1217. Mika Morozov. 1905 // State Tretyakov Gallery. Catalog of the collection. Painting]. Живопись XVIII—XX веков (in Russian). Vol. 5. Живопись конца XIX — начала XX веков. М.: Сканрус. 2005. p. 340. ISBN 5-93221-089-3

=== Journalism and fiction ===
- Khorvatova, E. (2004). "1. Замужество". Маргарита Морозова. Грешная любовь [Margarita Morozova. Sinful love]. Знак судьбы (in Russian). М.: АСТ-Пресс Книга. pp. 3–62. ISBN 978-5-462-00249-6. ISBN 5-4620-0249-1
- Pyder, R. (2011). Предчувствие [Presentiment] (in Russian). Vol. 3 / 4. Вышгород: Журнал. — Эстонский культурный центр «Русская энциклопедия». pp. 87–94. ISSN 1023-1099.
- Smith, V. A. (2019). Мика Морозов — последняя ветвь на древе Морозовых // После выставки Серова. Портреты, судьбы, история… [Mika Morozov - the last branch on the Morozovs' tree // After Serov's exhibition. Portraits, Fates, History...] (in Russian). М.: Новый Хронограф. pp. 242–247. ISBN 978-5-9488-1459-9.

=== Pedagogical literature ===
- Voroshina, L. V. (2018). "Занятие 25. Тема: Рассматривание и описание портретов В. Серова «Мика Морозов» и «Девочка с персиками»". Развитие речи и общения детей дошкольного возраста в 2 частях. 2-е изд., пер. и доп. Практическое пособие для академического бакалавриата [Development of speech and communication of preschool children in 2 parts. 2nd ed., rev. and ext. Practical Manual for Academic Bachelor's Degree.] (in Russian). Vol. 2. Старшая и подготовительная группы (Бакалавр. Академический курс). М.: ЮРАЙТ. pp. 56–58. ISBN 978-5-5340-6211-3.
- Ignatovich T. V., Murina L. A., Zhadeyko Zh. F. (2018). "Обобщающие слова при однородных членах предложения и знаки препинания при них". Русский язык: Учебное пособие для 8 класса учреждений общего среднего образования с белорусским и русским языками обучения [Russian language: Textbook for the 8th grade of general secondary education institutions with Belarusian and Russian languages of instruction] (in Russian) (Мн. ed.). Национальный институт образования[бел.] pp. 149–156. ISBN 978-9-8559-4-121-8.
- Kalenchuk M. L., Churakova N. A., Baykova T. A. (2013). "Работа с картиной. Устное сочинение". Русский язык. 3 класс. В 3-х частях [Russian language. 3 grade. In 3 parts] (in Russian). Vol. 2. М.: Академкнига. pp. 46–51. ISBN 978-5-4940-1587-7.
- Kanakina V. P., Goretsky V. G. (2013). "Имя прилагательное". Русский язык. 4 класс. Учебник для общеобразовательных организаций в 2-х частях [Russian language. 4th grade. Textbook for general educational organizations in 2 parts]. Школа России (in Russian). Vol. 2. М.: Просвещение. pp. 3–50.
- Krasnushkin, E. V. (2012). "Занятие 7. Детский портрет". Портрет. Методические рекомендации к наглядно-дидактическому пособию для занятий с детьми 4—7 лет [Portrait. Methodological recommendations to the visual and didactic manual for lessons with children of 4-7 years old]. Мир искусства (in Russian). М.: Мозаика-Синтез. pp. 10–12. ISBN 978-5-8677-5956-8.
- Nikitina, E. R. (2021). "Мика Морозов (1901)". Художники России и их картины. Начальная школа [Artists of Russia and their paintings. Elementary school]. Школьный словарик (in Russian). М.: ВАКО. p. 64. ISBN 978-5-4080-5404-6.
- Sitnikova T. E., Yatsenko I. I. (2021). "Урок 85. Сочинение на тему «Чем мне запомнилась картина В. А. Серова „Мика Морозов"»". Поурочные разработки по русскому языку. 4 класс (к УМК В. П. Канакиной, В. Г. Горецкого («Школа России»)). 8-е издание [The development work on the Russian language. Grade 4 (for the teaching materials of V. P. Kanakina, V. G. Goretsky (“School of Russia”)). P. Kanakina, V. G. Goretsky (“School of Russia”)). 8th edition]. В помощь школьному учителю (in Russian). М.: ВАКО. pp. 285–287. ISBN 978-5-4080-4244-9.
- Tivikova, S. K. (2017). "Утро. Развитие речевого поведения младших школьников". 2 класс. Методическое пособие к программе внеурочной деятельности [2nd grade. Methodical manual to the program of extracurricular activities] (in Russian). Нижний Новгород: Нижегородский институт развития образования. p. 168.
