= Margarita Morozova =

Russian philanthropist, patron of arts, editor, and memoirist

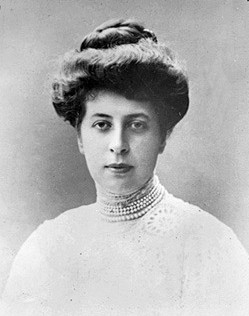
- Born: Margarita Kirillovna Mamontova; November 3, 1873; Moscow, Russian Empire
- Died: October 3, 1958 (aged 83); Moscow, USSR
- Occupations: Patron of arts, memoirist, publisher
- Spouse: Mikhail Abramovich Morozov (m. 1891; died 1903)
- Children: four, including Mikhail (1897–1952)

Margarita Kirillovna Morozova (née Mamontova; November 3 [o.s. October 22], 1873, – October 3, 1958) was a prominent Russian philanthropist, patron of arts, publisher, editor and memoirist. She was a co-founder of the Moscow-based Religious and Philosophical Society (1905–1918) and the director of the Russian Musical Society. She was the wife of art critic and collector Mikhail Morozov, and a socialite whose portraits were painted by Valentin Serov and Nikolai Bodarevsky, among others.

== Biography ==
=== 19th century ===
Margarita Kirillovna Mamontova was born at Pokrovka Street in Moscow, into a well-established merchant's family. Her father Kirill Nikolayevich inherited a vast fortune but proved incapable of making good use of it. Having squandered all of his money and most of the family's property, he shot himself, leaving his wife Margarita Ottovna (née Loewenstein) with two young daughters and without any means. She survived by doing needlework and later launched her own dress-making courses and a sewing factory.

At the age of thirteen Margarita joined the Petropavlovskaya gymnasium. Soon, along with her sister Elena, she established contacts with her late father's relatives, notably Pavel Tretyakov, the Tretyakovskaya Gallery founder, who introduced them to the world of fine arts. In the late 1880s Margarita became fond of both drama and opera, relishing the best of Italian masters in the private opera house owned by her uncle Savva Mamontov. A frequent guest in the house of the latter's brother, publisher Anatoly Mamontov, she met there Valentin Serov, Mikhail Vrubel, Ilya Ostroukhov and Konstantin Korovin, among others. On 10 November 1891, Margarita married 21-year-old Mikhail Morozov, heir to the famous merchants' dynasty; they had four children, including the Shakespearean scholar Mikhail Morozov (1897-1952), portrayed as a child by Serov (Mika Morozov). Later into the decade Margarita started to collect art.

=== 20th century ===
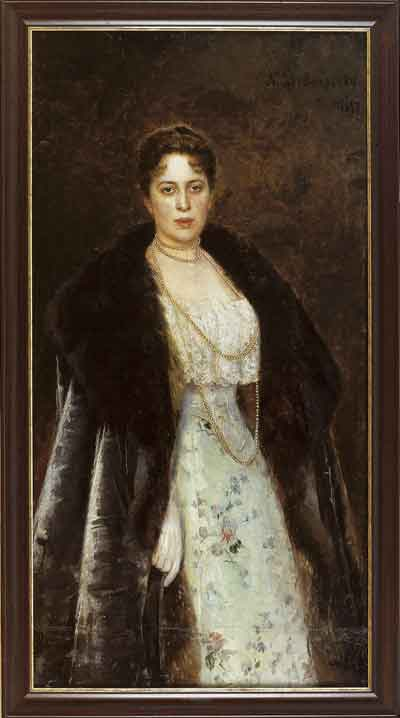
Margarita Morozova, by Nikolai Bodarevsky, 1897

In October 1903, Margarita's husband Mikhail Morozov died of nephritis. Soon after the birth of their posthumous daughter Maria in 1904, Morozova left Russia for Switzerland. After her return a year later, her house became a political centre, attracting among others various members of the RSDRP. In November 1905 Morozova (alongside Sergey Bulgakov, Prince Yevgeny Trubetskoy and Nikolai Berdyayev among others) became one of the organizers of the Moscow Religious and Philosophical Society. Having inherited from her late husband the post of the director of the Moscow Conservatory, she became friends with Alexander Scriabin, who became her personal piano tutor. In 1904-1908 Morozova supported Scriabin financially and stopped doing this only after their personal relations deteriorated. After the composer's death she financed the launching of Scriabin's museum and sustained members of his family for quite a while. In 1910 Morozova transferred most of her late husband's art collection (more than 60 paintings) to the Tretyakovskaya Gallery.

Much publicized at the time was her romance with the poet Andrey Bely who recognized some mystical reasons behind his infatuation with her (which started in 1901) and signed his early love letters as "Your Knight". For Bely Morozova has become what Lydia Mendeleeva (as a Beautiful Dame) was for Alexander Blok; this love has shaped his whole artistic world and inspired his best known works (like "First Rendes-vous", 1921). Through Bely she became close to brothers Emiliy and Nikolai Medtners, the music critic and composer, respectively.

In 1905 Morozova started a platonic relationship with Prince Yevgeny Trubetskoy, a married man and the father of three. Under his influence Morozova developed a strong interest in philosophy. In March 1905 the pair started the newspaper Moskovsky Ezhenedelnik (The Moscow Weekly), with Trubetskoy as an editor, which lasted till August 1910. In March 1910, Morozova launched Put (The Path) publishing house which specialized in religious and philosophical literature (Vladimir Solovyov, Berdyayev, Bulgakov, Trubetskoy himself, Pavel Florensky). Mikhail Gershenzon published here works by Pyotr Chaadayev and Ivan Kireevsky.

After the 1917 Revolution Morozova's house was nationalized but she was allowed to keep two basement rooms in it where she lodged with her sister Elena. She retained them after 1926 when the building became the Danish Embassy, and even took part in the ceremonies held by the Ambassador. The latter, reportedly, has offered her the Danish citizenship, but she declined the offer. In the 1930s the sisters, forced to leave the house, moved to their dacha in Lianozovo, nearby Moscow. By this time most of her children (excepting son Mikhail) have emigrated, the last one to leave was Maria, in 1927. During the Great Patriotic War Mikhail and the Morozova sisters shared one room in a house at Pokrovka, not far from the place where Margarita was born.

In 1950s Morozova wrote essays on Scriabin, as well as some memoirs on Bely, Scriabin and the Medtner brothers. Only fragments of them appeared in the USSR (notably, pieces on Scriabin in 1972); they were published fully only in the post-Soviet times. Margarita Morozova spent her last years in poverty, relying only upon the financial help of friends. She died on 3 October 1958, of a stroke, and is interred in Vvedenskoye Cemetery in Moscow.

== Gallery ==
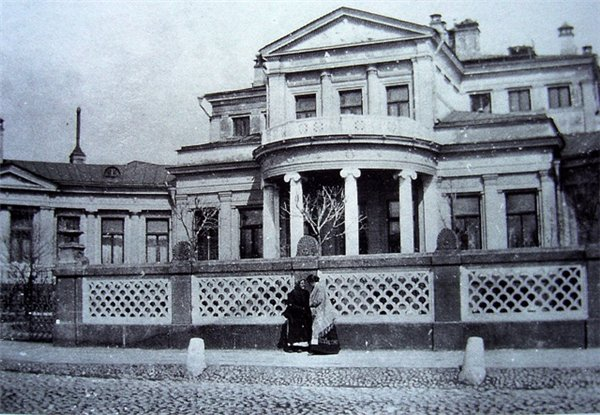
Morozov's mansion on Smolensky Boulevard in Moscow. Photo taken between 1890 and 1900

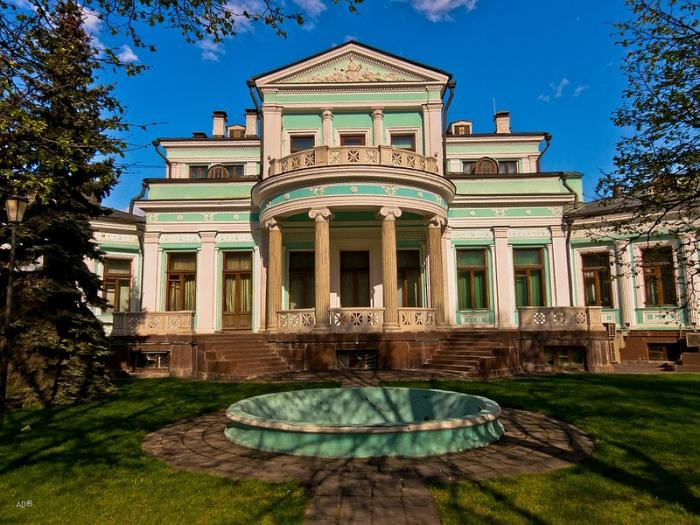
The former mansion of Mikhail Abramovich Morozov on Smolensky Boulevard, 26\9. Photo taken 2012

== Morozov house ==
From 1993 to 2015, the Morozov house was the location of the Rossiysky Kredit Bank, Russian Credit Bank or Roscredit (Russian: банк «Российский кредит»), which was headed by Bidzina Ivanishvili (Russian: Бидзина Иванишвили), who is a citizen of Russia, Georgia, and France that became the prime minister of Georgia on 25 October 2012 when he was the richest man in Georgia and worth $5.5 billion according to Forbes, and Vitaly Malkin (Russian: Виталий Малкин), who became a member of the Federation Council, which then passed to Anatoly Motylev (Russian: Анатолий Мотылев). After Roscredit's license was revoked by the Central Bank of Russia on 24 July 2015, the Office of the Presidential Affairs managed the Morozov house.

With Russian Institute for Strategic Studies (RISI) under the leadership of Mikhail Fradkov, which began on 4 January 2017, the Morozov house at Smolensky Boulevard, 26/9, building 1, underwent improvements under the Office of the Presidential Affairs, (Note: Mikhail Fradkov's son Pavel Fradkov (Russian: Павел Фрадков) is the deputy head of the Office of the Presidential Affairs.) which were authorized by Vladimir Putin on 22 February 2017, to become the location of RISI's offices. In 2019, the restoration was completed.

== See also ==
- Mika Morozov (painting of Margarita Morozova's son Mika)
