= Girl with Porcelain =

1916 painting by Alexander Golovin

Girl with Porcelain (Frosya)
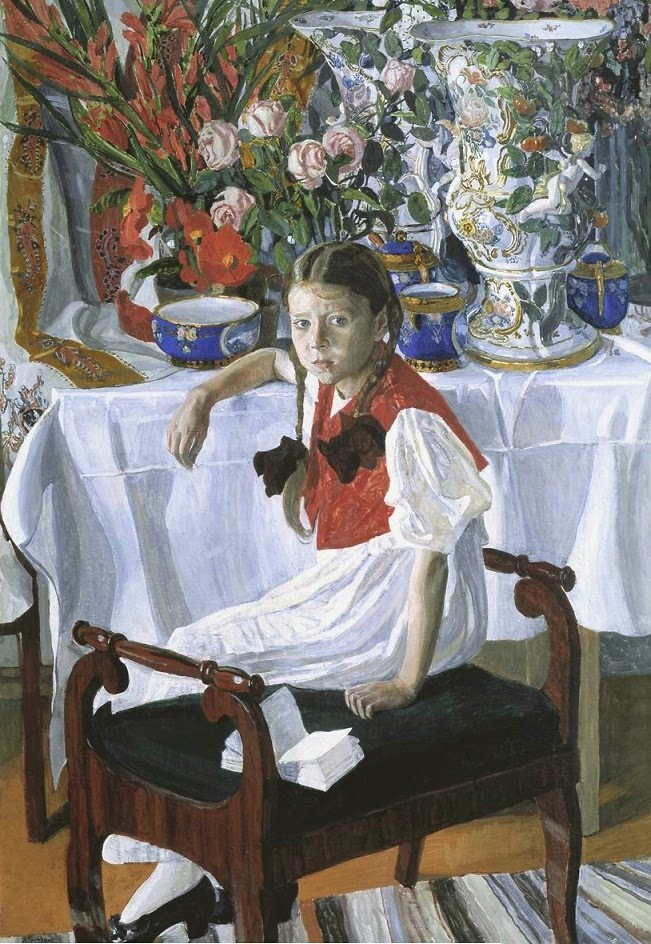
- Artist: Alexander Golovin
- Year: 1916
- Type: Painting
- Medium: Tempera on canvas
- Dimensions: 146 cm × 97.2 cm (57 in × 38.3 in)
- Location: Tretyakov Gallery; Moscow
- Accession: 9056

Girl with Porcelain (Frosya) (Russian: Де́вочка и фарфо́р, Фро́ся) is a painting by Russian and Soviet artist Alexander Golovin. Created in 1916, it is part of the collection of the Tretyakov Gallery. Art historian Ida M. Gofman considered Girl with Porcelain a work characteristic of Russian painting of the 1910s. She noted its "sparkling colorfulness" but pointed out the "sharpness of color contrasts, and overloaded composition", and fragmented rhythm built on intersecting multidirectional lines. According to her, these elements evoke a sense of unease and inner tension in the viewer.

Contemporary Russian art historian Vladimir Kruglov called the painting one of the artist's most poetic works of that period.

== Creation history ==
In 1913, a chronic heart disease forced Alexander Golovin to leave Saint Petersburg and move to Tsarskoye Selo. The paintings Golovin created in the 1910s retained the modernist stylistics but acquired distinct features of neoclassicism. The color palette of his works is lighter, with the artist favoring local colors, calmer compositions, and models depicted in characteristic poses but within "everyday situations".

According to Ida Gofman, making children's portraits was typical for artists at the turn of the 19th and 20th centuries. In her view, painters used children's portraits to escape anxious thoughts and complex emotional experiences. In this regard, Golovin's portrait is a rare exception. Painted a year before the revolutionary events of 1917, it reflects not only the artist's inner world, enamored with beauty and dreaming of harmony, but also acutely conveys the contradictions of the social life of his time, according to Gofman.

Still life attracted many Russian artists of the early 20th century, regardless of their artistic movements. Golovin had liked flowers since childhood, and had seen exotic specimens through the glass of a greenhouse at the Petrovsko-Razumovskoye estate. He grew flowers himself, carefully selecting varieties, loved painting bouquets, and incorporated flowers into his portraits. In his early 20th-century portraits, flowers typically served as decoration, ornament, or pattern. In the 1910s, as Gofman noted, flowers became a true passion for the artist. He ordered flower specimens from Holland. His students recalled that Golovin's flower garden at his dacha in Volosovo was an extraordinarily colorful spectacle. He wrote: "I have a special love for flowers, and I depict them with botanical precision". He often included items from porcelain sets in his still lifes. Eleonora Paston wrote: "Their cold whiteness was for him a reference point in the complex score of white shades, to which he always paid close attention".

Golovin's still lifes are distinguished by their decorative elements, typically composed of porcelain dishes, flowers, and brightly patterned fabrics. Gofman believed that the main protagonist of the artist's still lifes was the flowers: for him, as for other Russian symbolists, they represented not the force of life but a sign and mystery of perfection. According to her, they became a source of inspiration for Golovin and a school of color. She noted that Golovin long struggled to achieve the desired result — to imbue the work with the high harmony and beauty he discovered in flowers, these "marvelous creations of nature". His portraits conveyed tension and inner coldness. The world surrounding the human figure remained alien, marked by anxiety and distrust. In the painting Woman in a Hat (mid-1910s), Gofman saw the artist's arbitrariness in placing an unrelated bouquet of red roses next to a woman in a stiff hat pulled over her eyes.

Golovin himself stated in connection with the creation of Girl with Porcelain that in easel painting, he was drawn not only to the subject but also to painterly challenges. Art historian N. A. Grushevskaya noted that color patches, their range, and the mood created while working on the canvas held great significance for the artist. He sought a decorative patch in real nature. The artist built the composition based on color harmony and tone combinations, creating the overall mood of the painting. According to Grushevskaya, this approach (the search for "living color") "aligns the artist with the masters of the Union of Russian Artists".

In his book Encounters and Impressions: An Artist's Memoirs, Golovin recalled working on Girl with Porcelain:

I eagerly painted still lifes and flowers, drawn to their combination of vibrant and joyful colors. Sometimes, I was captivated by a bright patch and its combination with other tones and the surrounding environment. Once, I painted a portrait of a little girl—my five-year-old friend Frosya, the daughter of a janitor—seating her at a table laden with porcelain; the girl in a red dress sat on a banquette, (Note: A piece of furniture, an elongated bench, usually with a soft seat and no backrest) upholstered in green rep, and these two patches, combined with the colorful hues of the porcelain, created a lively, joyful range.

The portrait was liked by Morozov, who acquired it; after the nationalization of Morozov’s collection, the portrait entered the Tretyakov Gallery.

== Description of the painting ==
In the foreground, the painting depicts a girl timidly perched on the edge of an expensive Empire style chair. The artist portrayed Frosya, the five-year-old daughter of a janitor in the house where he lived at the time. (Note: According to another version, Frosya was the daughter of Golovin’s maid.) She looks out of place amidst the luxurious interior setting. The table is laden with antique vases, exquisite dishes, and flowers. The artist presents two worlds: one, the still life, is a realm of dreams about a happy and luxurious world; the girl's sad eyes bring the viewer back to the second world—reality with its sorrows and contradictions. Contemporary Russian art historian Vladimir Kruglov called the painting one of Golovin's most poetic works of the time.

== The painting in the Tretyakov Gallery collection ==
The canvas measures 146 by 97.2 centimetres (57.5 in × 38.3 in) (according to other sources, 141.6 by 97.8 centimetres (55.7 in × 38.5 in). It is executed in tempera on canvas. The lower left corner bears the inscription "A. Golovin". The painting is in the collection of the Tretyakov Gallery, with the inventory number 9056. It was purchased from the artist by entrepreneur and collector I. A. Morozov for his Moscow collection. After the nationalization of the collection, it entered the State Museum of New Western Art, and later, in 1927, the State Porcelain Museum, from where it was transferred to the Tretyakov Gallery. (Note: According to another version, cited, for example, in Gofman’s book, the painting entered the Tretyakov Gallery in 1927 directly from the State Museum of New Western Art.)

The painting was exhibited at the 14th exhibition of the Union of Russian Artists, held in 1916–1917 in Moscow (No. 397 in the exhibition catalogue), at Alexander Golovin's solo exhibition in 1963 in Moscow, and at the exhibition Alexander Golovin: Fantasies of the Silver Age. On the 150th Anniversary of His Birth at the Tretyakov Gallery in 2014.

== Critics ==
=== Soviet art historians on the painting ===
Soviet art historian Valentina Antonova emphasized the realism of Golovin's painting, contrasting it with the works of Russian symbolists, fauvists, and cubists:

The lively charm of the child’s movement, warily observing the painter creating the portrait, is particularly striking amidst the transient beauty of objects. The starched tablecloth’s folds bristle, the ornate porcelain gleams colorfully, its glossy plastic surface competing with the tender flesh of wilting roses, the fragility of begonias, and the lush greenery of branches spread against the soft patterned fabric. The pages of a small book left on the seat rustle, the girl’s feet in shiny shoes rest comfortably on a striped rug, completing the splendid “essence of the world as it is” in this painting, so distinct from the artistic quests of "Blue Rose" and "Jack of Diamonds", which seek the “essence as it should be”.

Soviet painter, graphic artist, posterist, and writer Nina Vatolina in her book A Stroll Through the Tretyakov Gallery described her impressions of meeting a girl sitting at a table in the Tretyakov Gallery's cafeteria, strikingly reminiscent of the heroine of Golovin's painting:

She sat exactly like Frosya in Golovin’s painting Girl and Porcelain (Frosya), turning toward you from the stiff folds of the starched tablecloth, from the lush beauty of the flowers and porcelain on the table. The resemblance began and ended with the child’s movement, the curiosity of her slightly furrowed childlike eyes; it was both fleeting and persistent.

After this unexpected encounter, Vatolina confessed to feeling a strong connection to Golovin's portrait and even a "sense of involvement in its creation".

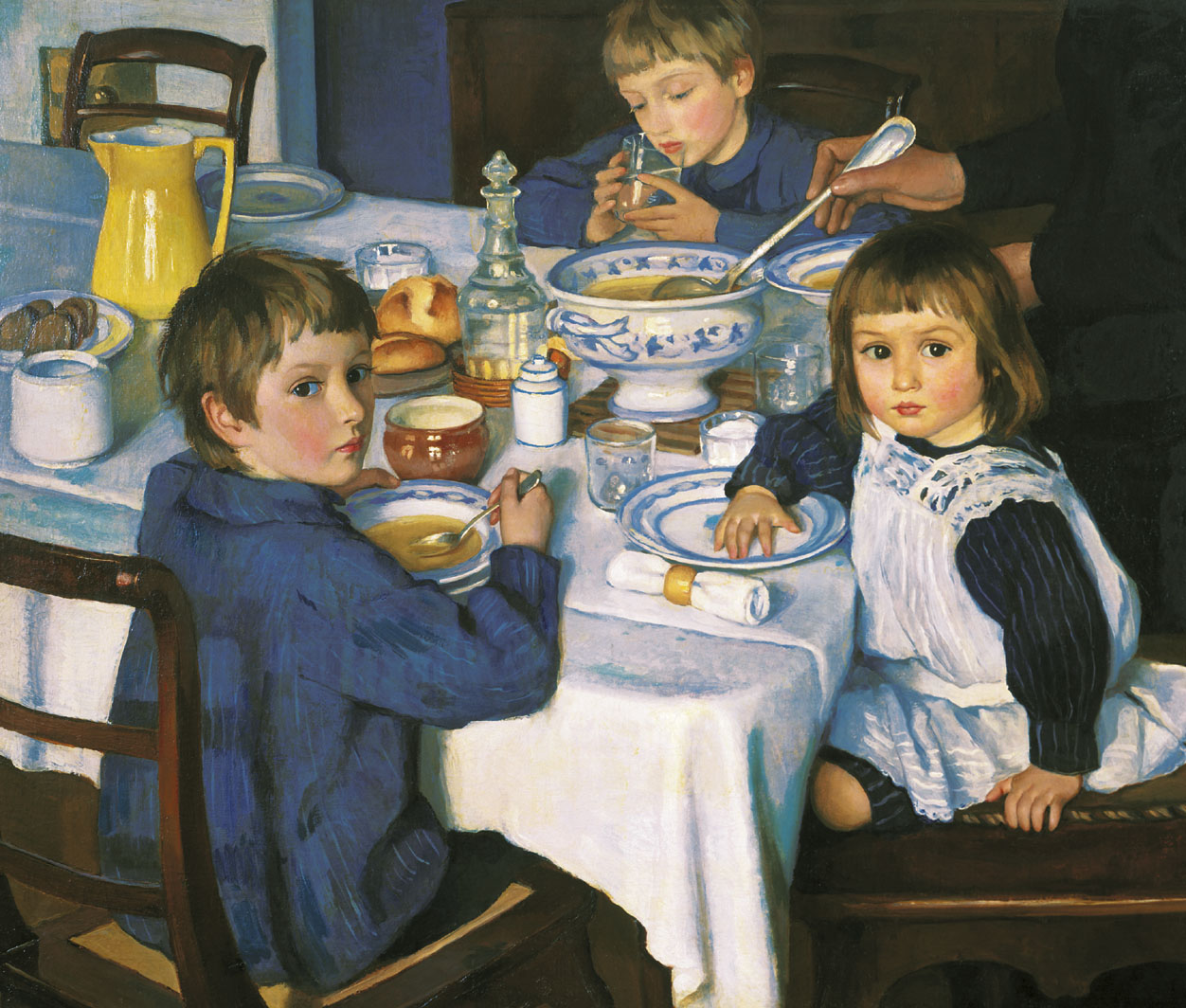
Zinaida Serebriakova. At Breakfast, 1914

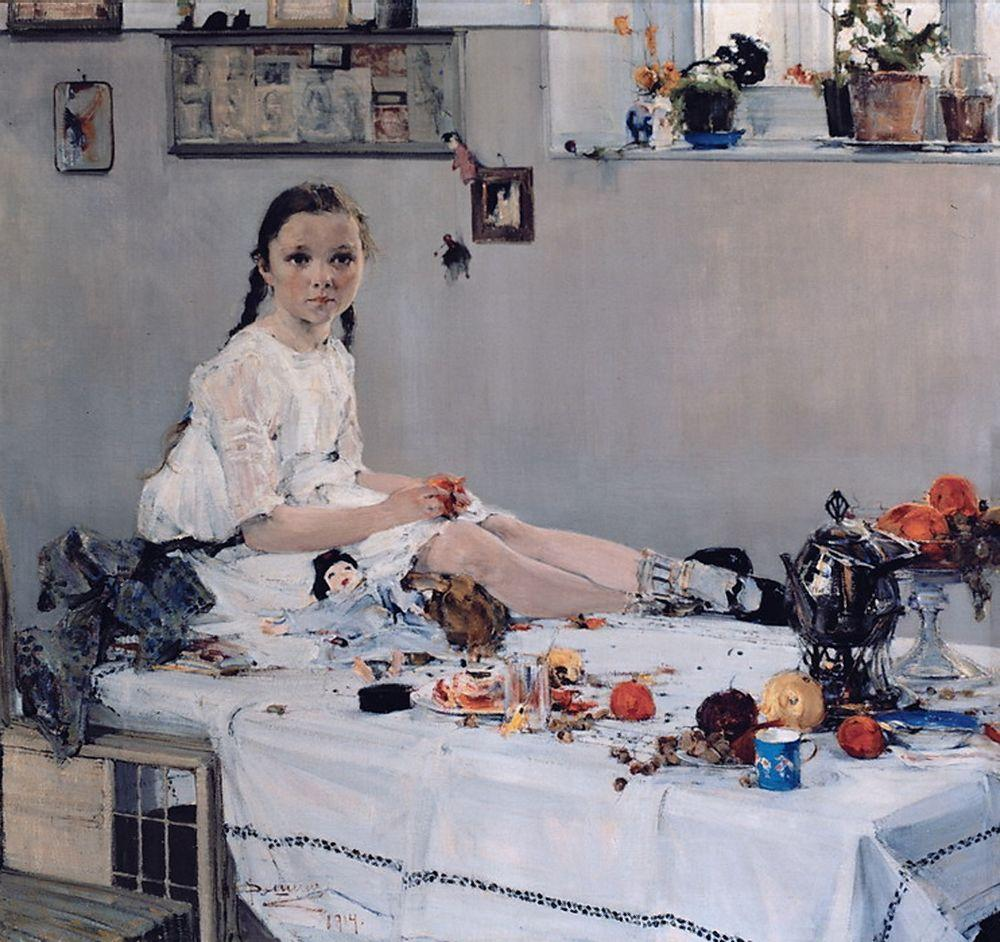
Nikolai Fechin. Portrait of Varya Adoratskaya, 1914

Ida M. Gofman considered Girl with Porcelain a work characteristic of Russian painting of the 1910s. She placed it alongside the paintings At Breakfast by Zinaida Serebriakova (1914) and Portrait of Varya Adoratskaya by Nikolai Fechin (1914). She identified common elements in these three paintings: decorativeness and a subject matter involving children and a colorful still life on a table. However, each artist, in her view, approached this subject differently. Serebriakova depicted a lively scene with children during breakfast. In At Breakfast, the still life lends immediacy and specificity to the depiction. The objects on the canvas exist for the children (in their hands, used for eating). Gofman noted that their interaction reveals the children's personalities and age-specific traits. In Fechin's work, the situation is more contrived: the girl sits on the table amidst a picturesque disorder of unwashed dishes and scattered fruits. She is the main focus of the artist's attention. The objects, flowers, books, and pictures on the walls — all these bright patches are arranged around her figure in a light dress, creating a unique atmosphere of a child's world. However, according to Gofman, Varya's face in Fechin's painting lacks carefree happiness; it is serious and anxious in an unchildlike way. In Gofman's view, this image is much closer to Golovin's Frosya than the bright images of Serebriakova's children are.

Nevertheless, despite similarities, Golovin's portrait is resolved differently from Fechin's from an artistic perspective. The girl in Golovin's painting is integrated into the overall color composition of the canvas as one of its components. Frosya's figure is placed not on the table, as in Fechin's work, but beside it, where a large mass of expensive flowers and collectible porcelain is displayed. Her face (framed by thin braids), by the artist's design, is at the same level as the still life. It is positioned between a cup and a sugar bowl of bright blue porcelain. Gofman noted that the girl's face is even equal in size to these objects. The objects are not narratively connected to the girl; "they simply present themselves, showcasing their beauty." The portrait becomes a spectacle, with flowers and objects acting alongside the girl. The artist carefully selected the objects and planned the composition (arranging objects by size, shape, and color). By placing a mirror in the background, the artist doubled the number of objects on the table, simultaneously intensifying their impact on the viewer.

Golovin himself prepared a sketch for the costume in which Frosya posed for the portrait. According to Gofman, Golovin sought to construct reality in the painting according to the laws of beauty. He transformed the canvas into a festive spectacle, intensifying color and eschewing genre and everyday elements.

Gofman wrote about the painting: "Red, blue, green, and yellow colors, juxtaposed with cold white, resound like a powerful orchestra at fortissimo". Leningrad art historian S. A. Onufrieva compared the painting to the staging of Lermontov's play Masquerade (Girl with Porcelain was painted simultaneously with Golovin's work on the set design for this play) and saw many common features: fantastically beautiful and lavish decoration, richly ornamented fabrics, a colorful whirlwind, and unjustified luxury surrounding the characters. Expanding on her colleague's idea, Gofman noted the lush, sparkling colorfulness in Girl with Porcelain but also highlighted differences: the "sharpness of color contrasts, overloaded composition", and fragmented rhythm built on intersecting multidirectional lines, which, in her view, evoke a sense of unease and inner tension in the viewer.

The love for theatrical effects in the painting combines with the perception of the world by a realist artist who deeply and subtly feels nature. According to Gofman, this perception is evident in the lifelike simplicity and authenticity of the depiction of the little girl. Her face stands out for its seriousness, "inner depth", and "spiritual charm". It lacks the sharpness typical of Golovin's portraits of this period. However, there is also no joyful sense of life characteristic of Valentin Serov's paintings Girl with Peaches or Mika Morozov. The world of expensive and beautiful objects surrounding the janitor's daughter does not bring her joy; on the contrary, it overwhelms her. Gofman noted that Frosya appears constrained and tense. Her serious face and gaze convey fear and an "anxious question".

In a later work on Golovin's oeuvre, Ida Gofman noted the sharpness of color combinations and the intensity of compositional rhythms in the painting. In her view, the painting's "magical world of art… almost aggressively, with a certain defiance, opposes the surrounding reality". A different perspective was offered by Soviet historian of scenography and decorative art Arnold Bassekhes, who saw in the painting a "radiant, pure-colored, innocently ornate depiction of Golovin's little friend".

=== Russian art historians on the painting ===
Art historians at the Tretyakov Gallery, who included an annotation for Girl with Porcelain on the museum's website, agree with S. A. Onufrieva and Ida M. Gofman on the theatrical nature of the depiction. In their view, the canvas is characterized by a play with objects. Even works painted by Alexander Golovin from life resemble theatrical sets. By transforming reality into a theater stage, Golovin dramatizes flowers and porcelain. In the painting, he transforms objects: for example, he likens a living rose to one painted on a porcelain vase. The sugar bowl and teapot are depicted one behind the other, creating an illusion of mirror reflection, while the vases on the table are perceived by the viewer as reflections of one another. Tretyakov Gallery art historians believe that the girl's name in the title indicates the portrait-like nature of the depiction. However, they assert that the girl is "as much a decorative element of the work as the lush bouquets". The painting's composition contains an element of randomness, though the balance of all its elements suggests a meticulously planned composition.

In a book dedicated to Golovin's work, Soviet and Russian art historian A. P. Gusarova noted that the portrait Girl with Porcelain arose "from the artist's desire to combine the green patch of the couch and the red dress of the child". These colors, applied in large, vibrant patches, coexist with the delicate watercolor patterns of antique porcelain depicted on the table. Art historian Efim Vodonos noted a plastic rigidity in the depiction of material objects in the still life of Girl with Porcelain, contrasting it with the earlier still life Roses and Porcelain (dated 1912–1915), where such rigidity is absent.

Paintings associated with Girl with Porcelain by art historians

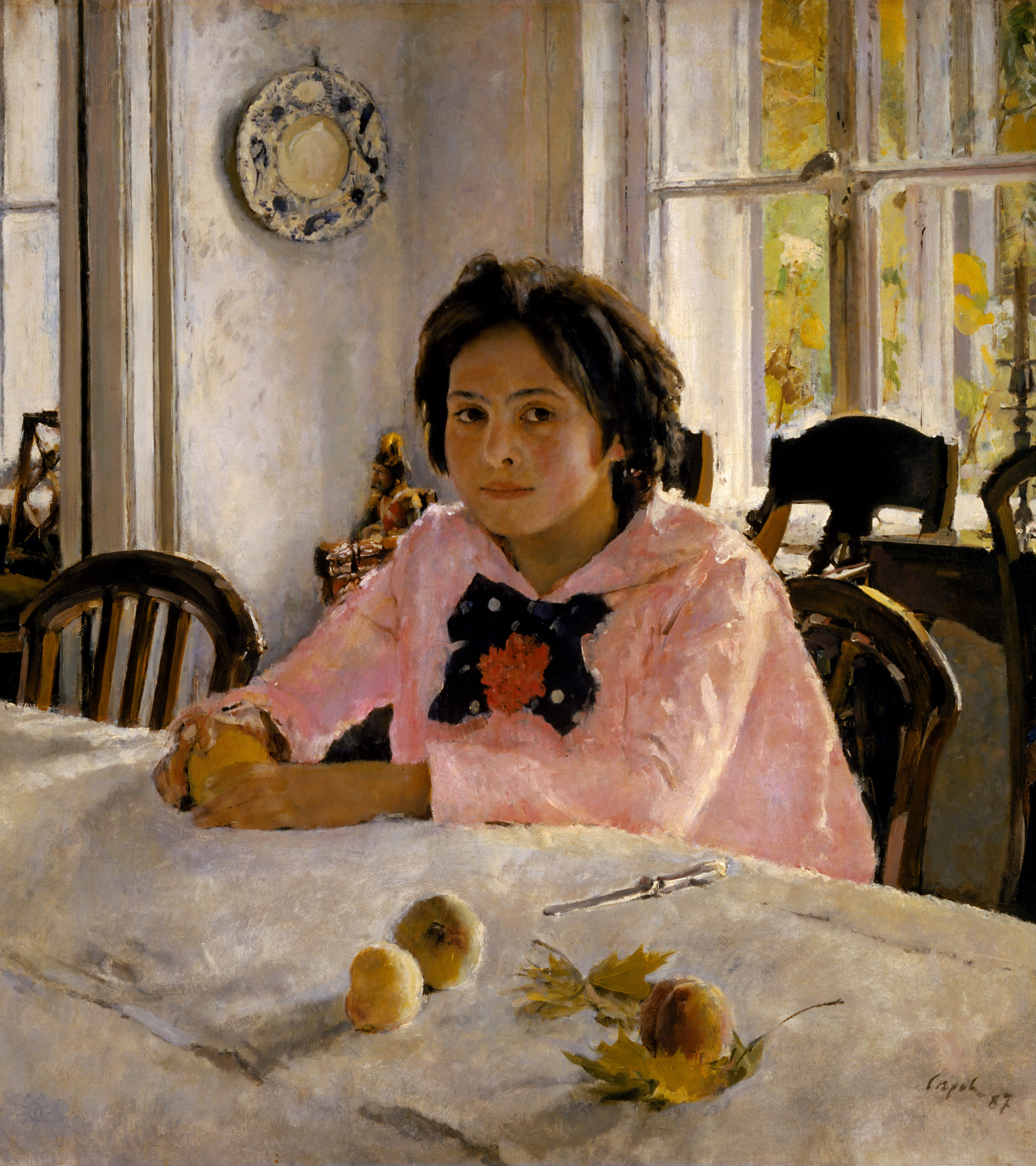
Valentin Serov. Girl with Peaches, 1887

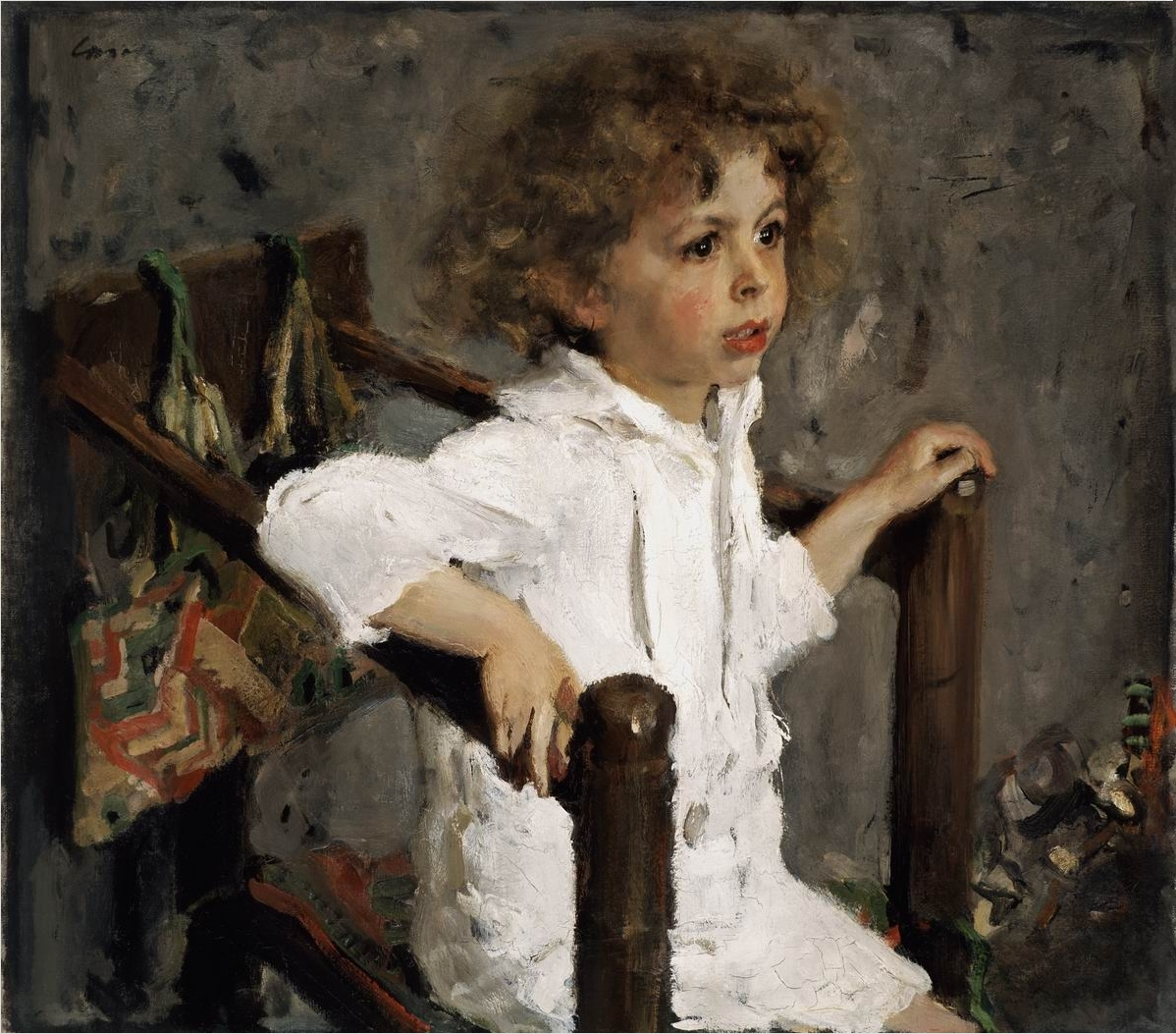
Valentin Serov. Mika Morozov, 1901

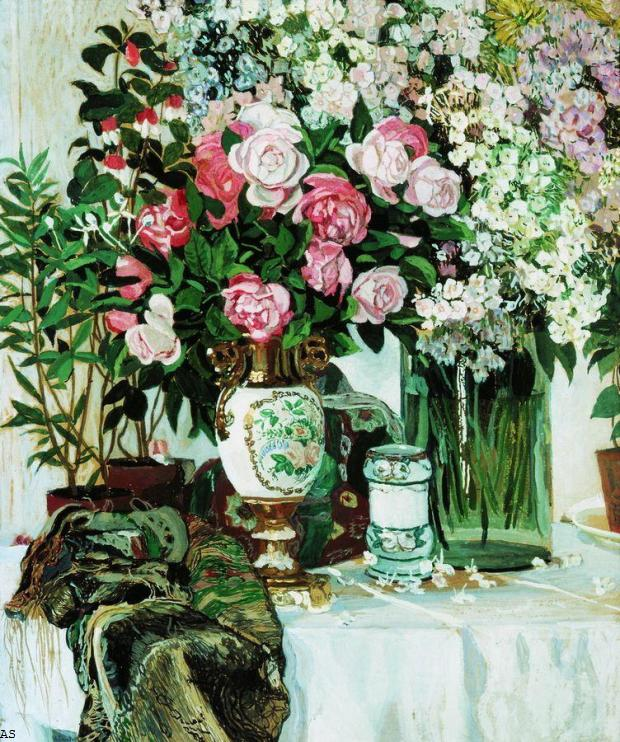
Alexander Golovin. Roses and Porcelain, 1910s

== Girl with Porcelain in education and upbringing ==
External videos
- Golovin’s painting on the “Culture” channel
- “To the Museum Without a Leash”: “Alexander Golovin ‘Girl and Porcelain’”, 2010

In 2010 the Culture television channel produced an overview of the history and artistic features of Alexander Golovin's painting as part of the children's program series To the Museum Without a Leash (13 minutes, Kvadrat Film studio, directed by Alexander Krivonos). In the dramatized storyline, a lonely Saint Petersburg professor (played by Russian actor and Golden Mask Award laureate Alexander Ronis) discusses the painting with his only listener, an English Cocker Spaniel.

The textbook Art. Visual Arts for 7th-grade general education schools, published in 2014 by Drofa and approved by the Ministry of Education and Science (later reprinted multiple times), uses a fragment of Golovin's painting to illustrate how artists depict facial expression and the gaze of a character.

== Bibliography ==
- Antonova, Valentina Ivanovna (1968). Государственная Третьяковская галерея [State Tretyakov Gallery] (75000 ed.). Moscow: Iskusstvo. p. 184.
- Bassekhes, Alfred Iosifovich (1970). Театр и живопись Александра Головина [Theater and Painting of Alexander Golovin] (10000 ed.). Moscow: Izobrazitelnoe Iskusstvo. p. 156.
- Vatolina, Nina Nikolaevna (1976). Прогулка по Третьяковской галерее [A Walk Through the Tretyakov Gallery] (40000 ed.). Moscow: Sovetsky Khudozhnik. p. 256.
- Vodonos, Efim Isaakovich (1995). Русские театральные художники начала XX века в собрании музея [Russian Theatrical Artists of the Early 20th Century in the Museum Collection]. Saratov: Saratov State Art Museum named after A. N. Radishchev.
- Golovin, Alexander Yakovlevich (1940). "Chapter XIV. Some Thoughts on My Work in Theater and My Paintings. The Thorns of a Portraitist. My Graphic Works for Soviet Publishers. A New Version of "Orpheus" for Ida Rubinstein. Restoration of the Odessa City Theater. "The Marriage of Figaro" at the Moscow Art Theatre. Arrival of M. A. Voloshin". Встречи и впечатления. Воспоминания художника [Encounters and Impressions. Memoirs of an Artist] (3000 ed.). Leningrad: Iskusstvo. p. 178.
- Gofman, Ida Markovna (1978). Головин-портретист [Golovin the Portraitist] (20000 ed.). Leningrad: Khudozhnik RSFSR. p. 163.
- Gofman, Ida Markovna (2014). "Classic of the Silver Age". Александр Головин. К 150-летию со дня рождения [Alexander Golovin. On the 150th Anniversary of His Birth]. Moscow: State Tretyakov Gallery. pp. 12–40. ISBN 978-5-89580-050-8.
- Gusarova, Alla Pavlovna (2003). Головин-портретист [Golovin the Portraitist] (1500 ed.). Moscow: Bely Gorod. p. 48. ISBN 5-7793-0548-X.
- Grushevskaya, Natalya Alekseevna (2015). Творческие методы А. Я. Головина и его близость к деятельности Союза русских художников [Creative Methods of A. Ya. Golovin and His Connection to the Activities of the Union of Russian Artists]. Moscow: Observatory of Culture. pp. 81–85.
- Yevstratova, Elena Nikolaevna (2014). "Alexander Golovin. Girl and Porcelain (Frosya)". 500 сокровищ русской живописи [500 Treasures of Russian Painting]. Moscow: Olma Media Group. ISBN 978-5-3730-4169-0.
- Kruglov, Vladimir Fedorovich (2014). "Alexander Golovin as a Portraitist". In Paston, Eleonora V. (ed.). Творчество Александра Головина в контексте художественной культуры Серебряного века. Тезисы международной научной конференции. 14.10 — 15.10. ГТГ [The Work of Alexander Golovin in the Context of the Artistic Culture of the Silver Age. Abstracts of the International Scientific Conference. October 14–15, State Tretyakov Gallery]. Moscow: State Tretyakov Gallery. pp. 47–54.
- Kruglov, Vladimir Fedorovich (2013). Александр Головин. Государственный Русский музей (альманах) [Alexander Golovin. State Russian Museum (Almanac)]. Vol. 374 (300 ed.). Saint Petersburg: Palace Editions. p. 132. ISBN 978-5-93332-438-6.
- Paston, Eleonora (2014). «Декоративно все и только декоративно». О юбилейной выставке Александра Головина в Третьяковской галерее ["Everything is Decorative and Only Decorative". On the Anniversary Exhibition of Alexander Golovin at the Tretyakov Gallery]. Moscow: Tretyakov Gallery.
- Petinova, Elena Fominichna (2006). "Alexander Golovin". От академизма к модерну: русская живопись конца XIX — начала XX века [From Academicism to Modernism: Russian Painting of the Late 19th – Early 20th Century]. Saint Petersburg: Iskusstvo-SPB. p. 570. ISBN 978-5-2100-157-23.
- Polunina, Nadezhda Mikhailovna (2003). Кто есть кто в коллекционировании старой России: новый биографический словарь [Who’s Who in Collecting Old Russia: A New Biographical Dictionary]. Moscow: Ripol-klassik. p. 553. ISBN 978-5-7905-215-39.
- Semenova, Natalya Yuryevna (2018). "Catalog of the Collections of Mikhail and Ivan Morozov". Михаил и Иван Морозовы. Коллекции [Mikhail and Ivan Morozov. Collections]. Moscow: Slovo. p. 640. ISBN 978-5-387-01520-5.
- Onufrieva, Svetlana Andreevna (1977). Головин [Golovin] (50000 ed.). Leningrad: Iskusstvo. p. 136.
