= Svyatoslav Belza =

- Святослав Бэлза
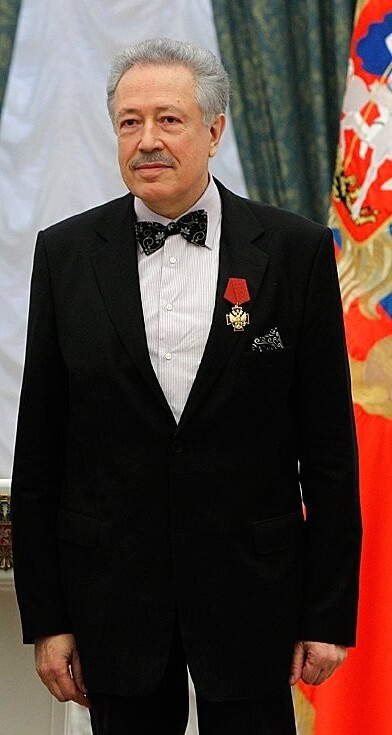
- Belza in 2012
- Born: Svyatoslav Igorevich Belza; 26 April 1942; Chelyabinsk, Russian SFSR, Soviet Union
- Died: 3 June 2014 (aged 72); Munich, Germany
- Occupations: journalist, critic, author, TV presenter,
- Years active: 1979–2014

Svyatoslav Igorevich Belza (Russian: Святосла́в И́горевич Бэ́лза; 26 April 1942 – 3 June 2014) was a Soviet Russian literary and musical scholar, critic and essayist, and a prominent TV personality who's launched and hosted several TV programs aimed at popularizing classical music, theatre, and ballet, including Music on Air and Masterpieces of the World Music Theatre. Belza has received high-profiled honors in three countries, among them the Russian Order of Merit for the Fatherland, the Order of Merit of the Republic of Poland, and the Ukrainian Order of Saint Nicholas.

== Biography ==
Svyatoslav Belza was born on 26 April 1942 in Chelyabinsk, to Igor Fyodorovich Belza (1904–1994), a Warsaw-born Soviet musician, composer, and art scholar, and Zoya Konstantinovna Belza-Doroshchuk (née Gulinskaya, 1921–1999).

In 1965, after graduating the philological faculty at the Moscow University, Belza joined the Gorky Institute of the world literature at the Russian Academy of Sciences. In 1979 he started regularly contributing to Literaturnaya Gazeta, initially as a foreign literature reviewer.

Belza authored more than 300 essays, the majority of which focus on either the Western literature, or the Russian authors' links with European culture. Among his notable works are "Bryusov and Dante" (Dante and the Slavs anthology, 1965), "Bryusov and Poland" (1966), "Don Quixote in Russian Poetry" (1969), "The Polish Connections of Pyotr Vyazemsky" (Polish-Russian Literary Relations anthology, 1970), "Graham Greene" (English Literature, 1945–1980, 1987), "Pushkin and the Slavic Nations Cultural Unity" (1988), "Dante e la poesia russa nel primo quarto del XX secolo" (from Dantismo russo e cornice europea, Firenze, 1989), "Rozanov and his Readership" (Vasilij Rozanov. Milano, 1993), and "The Slovak Literature" (The History of the World Literature, Vol. 8, 1991).

One of the foremost experts on William Shakespeare in Russia, Belza compiled and edited the legacy of another important Russian Shakespearean scholar, Mikhail Morozov. He provided forewords and prefaces for more than 100 publications of works by William Shakespeare, Oscar Wilde, Alexandre Dumas, Honoré de Balzac, Jules Verne, Graham Greene, C. P. Snow, Edgar Allan Poe, Jan Parandowski, Stanisław Lem, Sławomir Mrożek, Teodor Parnicki, and Jarosław Iwaszkiewicz, among others. In 1990, he compiled The Reading Man. Homo Legens, lauded as an innovative study of the fundamental intellectual abilities of the modern man.

In 1987, Belza debuted on the Soviet television as a reviewer; a year later he became the presenter of his own programme, Music on Air (Muzyka v efire, 1988–1996). In 1993-1995 he was an art director of the Ostankino musical and entertainment department. In 1997, Belza started working for Kultura TV. Among his best known programmes there were Masterpieces of the World Theatre and In Your House. He co-hosted (with Maria Maksakova) the popular Romantika Romansa show and was a co-presenter (with Alla Sigalova) of The Bolshoi Opera (2011) and The Bolshoi Ballet (2012) competition shows.

Svyatoslav Belza died of pancreatic cancer on 3 June 2014 in Munich, Germany at the age of 72.

== Accolades ==
During his life Belza was awarded many distinctions. In 1988, Belza received the Polish Cultural Merit award. In 1994, he was honoured with the People's Artist of Russia title. He received the Officer's Cross of the Order of Merit of the Republic of Poland, as well as the Ukrainian Order of Saint Nicholas in 1997.

In 2000, Belza was awarded the Russian Order of Friendship. Among his other accolades were the Moscow Prize (2002) and the State Prize of the Russian Federation for arts and literature (2011), as well as the Order of Merit for the Fatherland (2012) and the "Award of the Government of the Russian Federation" in the field of culture (2013).

Belza was a member of the Russian Television Academy (1994-2014), the Russian Academy of Arts (since 1998) and the Eurasian Academy of Television (since 2001).

== Private life ==
In 1969 Belza married Nina Kulagina, then a Kiev University student, later the teacher of English (also a swimmer, and the USSR backstroke champion); they had one son, Igor Belza (born 1971), now a businessman, who is married to the artist Alexandra Otiyeva, based in Nice, France. After the divorce in 1981, Belza's partner was Olga Glebova, also teacher of English, and daughter of the actor Pyotr Glebov. They had one son, Fyodor Belza (born 1981), whose son Sergey is Svyatoslav Belza's grandson.
