= Igor Boelza =

Russian composer (1904–1994)

Igor Fyodorovich Belza or Boelza (Игорь Фёдорович Бэлза; 8 February 1904 – 5 January 1994) was a Soviet music historian and composer who wrote 4 symphonies, 5 piano sonatas, 2 cello sonatas, a string quartet, and several film scores for Alexander Dovzhenko. He was the father of Svyatoslav Belza, a showman and a TV personality.

Boelza was born in Kielce into a noble Polish family which moved to Kyiv after the outbreak of the First World War. He studied at the Kyiv Conservatory with Borys Lyatoshynsky. Belza delivered lectures in the Kyiv State University until the German invasion of Ukraine forced him to move to Moscow and join the staff of the Moscow Conservatory.

Boelza authored a slate of books about Mozart (1941), Alexander Borodin (1944), Antonín Dvořák (1949), Reinhold Glière (1955), Maria Szymanowska (1956), Vítězslav Novák (1957), Frédéric Chopin (1960), Michał Kleofas Ogiński (1965), Alexander Scriabin (1982) and Karol Szymanowski (1984). He received a Doctorate, honoris causa, from the Charles University of Prague, in 1967.

== Publications ==
- Igor Boelza. Handbook of Soviet Musicians. Westport, Conn.: Greenwood Press, 1943 / 1971. ISBN 9780781202015.
