= Aleksandr Golovin (artist) =

Russian painter and stage designer (1863–1930)

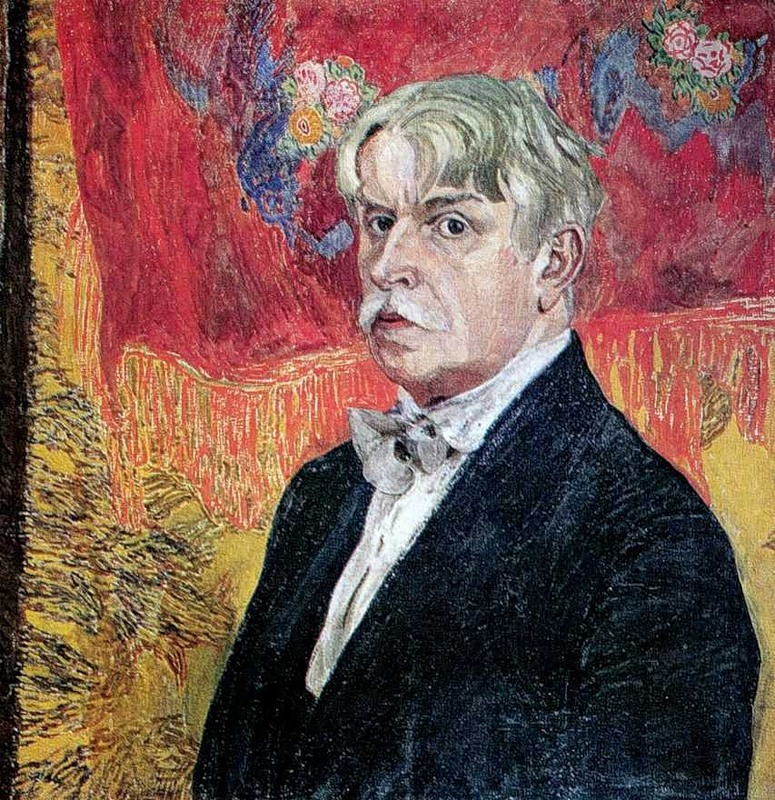
- Self portrait, 1919
- Born: 1 March 1863; Moscow, Moscow Governorate, Russian Empire
- Died: 17 April 1930 (aged 67); Detskoye Selo, Leningrad Oblast, Russian SFSR, USSR
- Known for: Painting, house decoration, stage design

Aleksandr Yakovlevich Golovin (Russian: Алекса́ндр Я́ковлевич Голови́н, Russian pronunciation: [ɐlʲɪˈksandr ɡəlɐˈvʲin]; 1 March [O.S. 17 February] 1863 – 17 April 1930) was a Russian and Soviet decorator, painter, and stage designer. He designed productions for Sergei Diaghilev, Constantin Stanislavski, and Vsevolod Meyerhold.

== Biography ==
Born in Moscow, Moscow Governorate in the Russian Empire, Golovin enrolled at the Moscow School of Painting, Sculpture and Architecture, where he initially studied architecture but later switched to painting, from 1881 to 1889. Due to financial difficulties, upon graduation he worked as an interior painter and decorator. He also tried his hand at various artistic fields such as furniture design. Later on, he attended the Académie Colarossi and Académie Vitti in Paris, Republican France. In 1900, he took part in designing the Russian pavilion at the Paris World's Fair together with his friend Konstantin Korovin.

In 1901, Golovin relocated to the town of Pushkin, in Saint Petersburg. It was here that he came into his own as a stage designer, combining symbolism and modernism on operatic and dramatic productions for Diaghilev, Meyerhold and others. After the Bolshevik Revolution (1917), Golovin found work in theatre less and less often, and so delved into painting and graphic illustration. Golovin provided the set design for the 1910 original production of Igor Stravinsky's The Firebird ballet.

Golovin provided the scenic design for an important production of Pierre Beaumarchais's The Marriage of Figaro at the Moscow Art Theatre. The seminal Russian theatre practitioner Constantin Stanislavski directed the play in fast and free-flowing production that opened on 28 April 1927, having been rehearsed since the end of 1925. Stanislavski relocated the play's action to pre-Revolutionary France and trimmed its five-act structure to eleven scenes; Golovin employed a revolve to quicken scene-changes. It was a great success, garnering ten curtain calls on opening night. Golovin was appointed a People's Artist of the RSFSR. He died in Detskoye Selo, Leningrad Oblast on 17 April 1930.

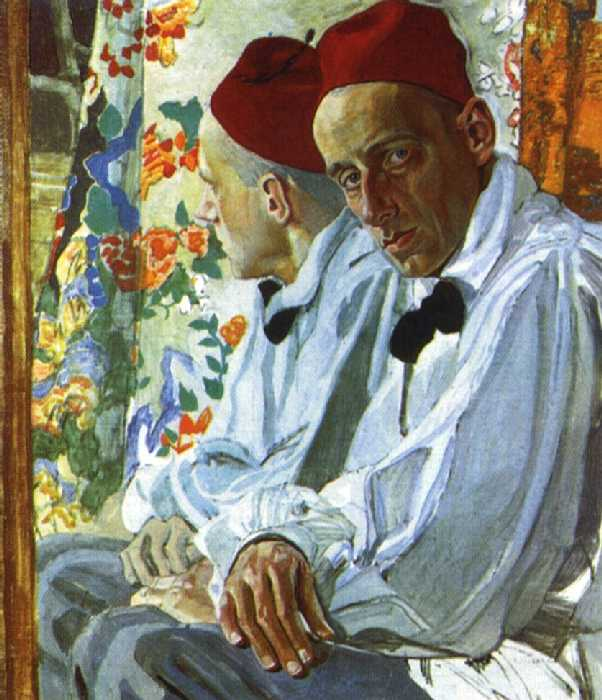
Alexander Golovin's portrait of Vsevolod Meyerhold, 1917

== See also ==
- Girl with Porcelain (1916), painting by Golovin in the Tretyakov Gallery, Moscow

== Sources ==
- Benedetti, Jean. 1999. Stanislavski: His Life and Art. Revised edition. Original edition published in 1988. London: Methuen. ISBN 0-413-52520-1.
