= Mikhail Morozov (art collector) =

Russian art collector (1870–1903)

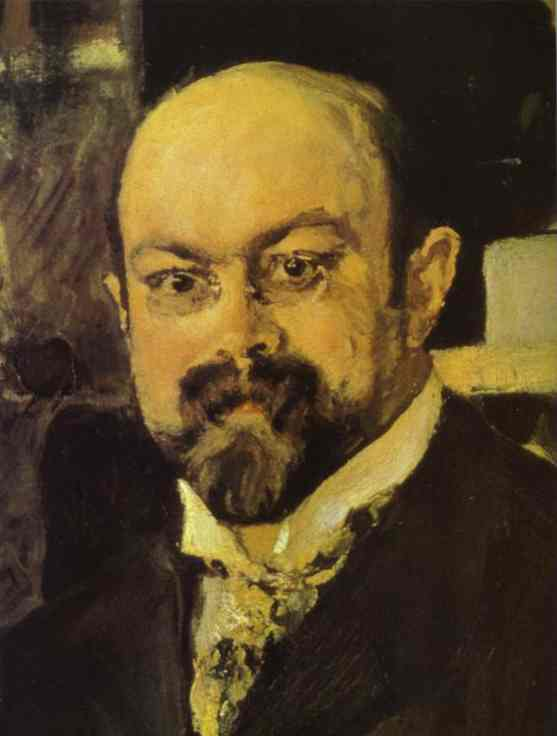
Detail of a 1902 portrait of Morozov by Valentin Serov, now in the Tretiakov Gallery.

Mikhail Abramovich Morozov (19 August 1870 - 24 October 1903) was a Russian businessman, arts patron and collector during the Belle Époque. He was the eldest son of Abram Abramovich Morozov, the elder brother of the collector Ivan Morozov (1871-1921) and the husband of the art collector Margarita Morozova (1873-1958).

== Life ==
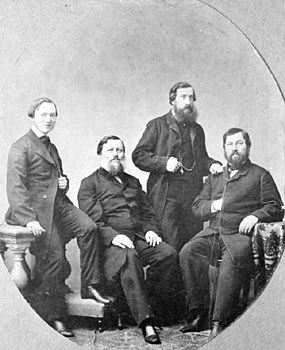
The Morozov family in the 1860s Mikhail's father is at the extreme left

The Morozov family were Old Believers, who often gave biblical names to their children, and belonged to the first guild of merchants.

His father Abram had been born to a family of Old Believers, who often gave biblical names to their children. The Morozov family belonged to the first guild of merchants. Abram left the Old Believers during his engagement to an Orthodox woman, but later converted to an Old Ritualist joined with the Russian Orthodox Church. Mikhail was baptised on 12 August at an Old Ritualist church near the Saltykov bridge on the Iaouza. His younger brother Ivan became a textile manufacturer and a major art collector who discovered Picasso, whilst another younger brother Arsène (1874-1908) was dandy passionate about hunting and took no part in business.

After dividing up the Morozov family's lands and goods, Abram and his brother David co-president-directors of the Tver Manufacture Company in 1872. His wife Varvara Alexeïevna (née Khloudova, 1848–1917) also helped manage the business. From 1877 he suffered from psychomotor disorders, possibly 'Bayle's disease' or general paralysis.

== Bibliography ==
- (in French) Anne Baldassari, La collection Morozov : Icônes de l'Art moderne, Gallimard, 2021, 440 p. (ISBN 978-2-0729-0458-5)
- (in French) Natalia Semenova and Michèle Kahn (translation), Les Frères Morozov, Actes Sud, 2021, 320 p. (ISBN 978-2-3301-3959-9)
- Site on Ivan Abramovitch Morozov
