= Girl with Peaches =

1887 painting by Valentin Serov

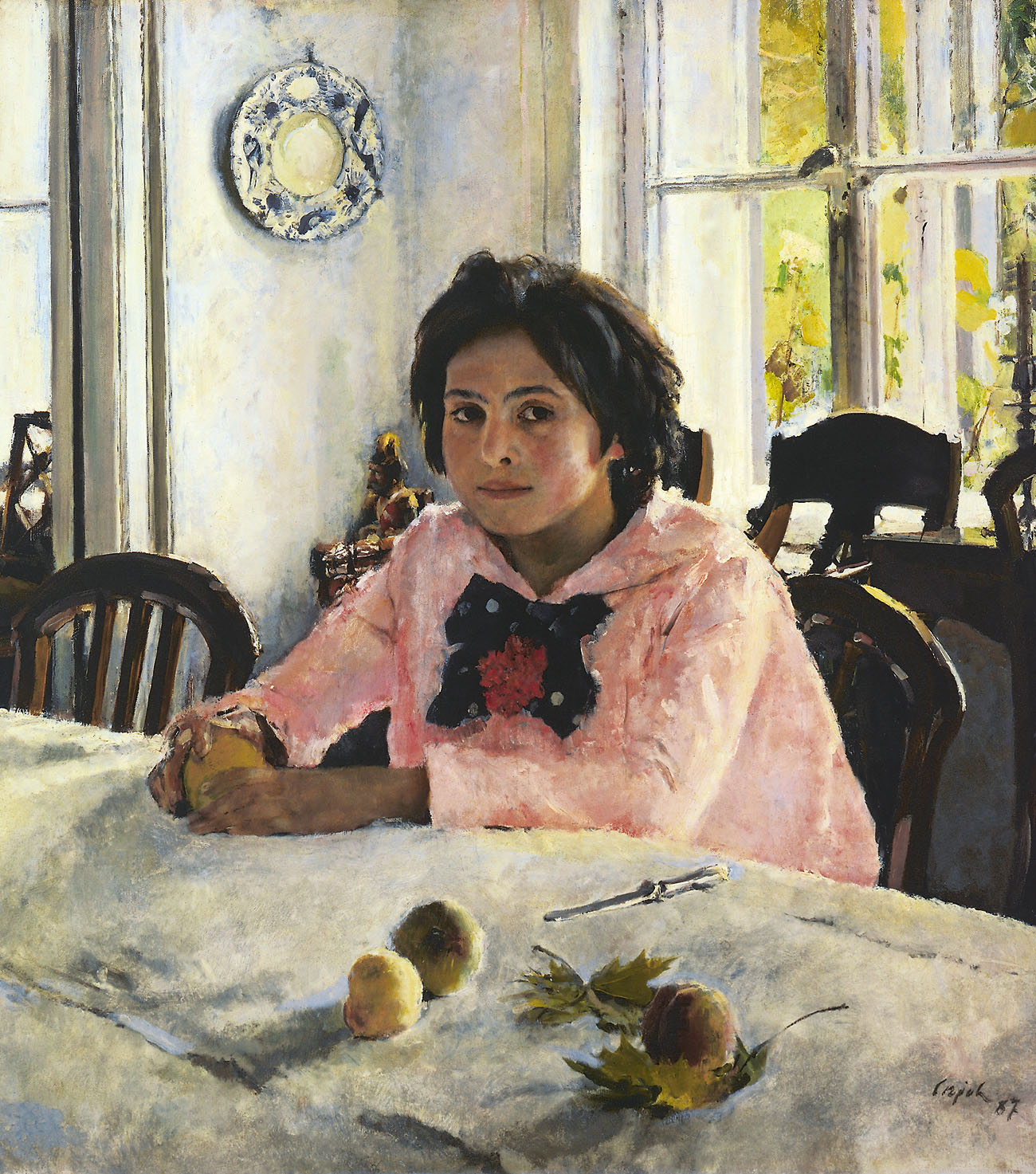
- Artist: Valentin Serov
- Year: 1887
- Medium: Oil-on-canvas
- Dimensions: 91 cm × 85 cm (36 in × 33 in)
- Location: Tretyakov Gallery, Moscow

Girl with Peaches (Russian: Девочка с персиками, romanized: Devochka s Persikami) is an 1887 painting by the Russian painter Valentin Serov.

It is considered to be one of Serov's greatest works and one of his most famous. Serov's friend and biographer, Russian art historian Igor Grabar, acclaimed it as "the masterpiece of Russian painting". According to the book 1000 Drawings of Genius, although the style of the painting (and Serov's early style in general) "has much in common with the French Impressionists, [Serov] did not become acquainted with their work until after he had painted [it]".

== History ==
The painting depicts 11-year-old Vera Mamontova, a daughter of Russian entrepreneur and patron of the arts Savva Mamontov.

It was painted at Abramtsevo, an estate not far from Moscow. Under the ownership of the writer Sergei Aksakov, Abramtsevo had become one of the centers of Russian culture. Mamontov bought the place in 1870 and continued the tradition. Among people who stayed there were painter Ilya Repin, writer Ivan Turgenev, painter Mikhail Vrubel, and sculptor Mark Antokolsky. It was a comfortable place for artists not only to gather and discuss important topics, but to live and create.

Valentin Serov knew Vera Mamontova from her babyhood, as he frequently visited Mamontov's Abramtsevo estate, and sometimes he even lived there for lengthy periods of time.

Serov later recalled,

All I wanted was freshness, that special freshness that you can always feel in real life and don't see in paintings. I painted it for over a month and tortured her, poor child, to death, because I wanted to preserve the freshness in the finished painting, as you can see in old works by great masters.

In 1887 the painting won first prize at the Exhibition of the Moscow Society of Lovers of Art.

The model, Vera Mamontova, was also painted by Viktor Vasnetsov in 'Girl With a Maple Branch' (1896). Vera married the head of the Moscow Nobility League, future Chief Prosecutor of the Most Holy Synod Alexander Dmitrievich Samarin in 1903. They had three children. In 1907, at the age of 32, she contracted pneumonia and died just a few days later. She is buried in Abramtsevo.

== Internet meme ==
The painting spawned a Russian Internet meme, in which the girl is placed into humorous scenarios or is replaced by a different person or character. One of the altered pictures depicted the girl sitting at a very large table covered with all sorts of dishes and was titled "The Girl with Peaches: Full Version".
