= Mikhail Mikhailovich Morozov =

Russian Shakespeare scholar

Mikhail Mikhailovich Morozov (Russian: Михаил Михайлович Морозов; 18 February 1897 – 9 May 1952) was a Russian Shakespeare scholar and translator.

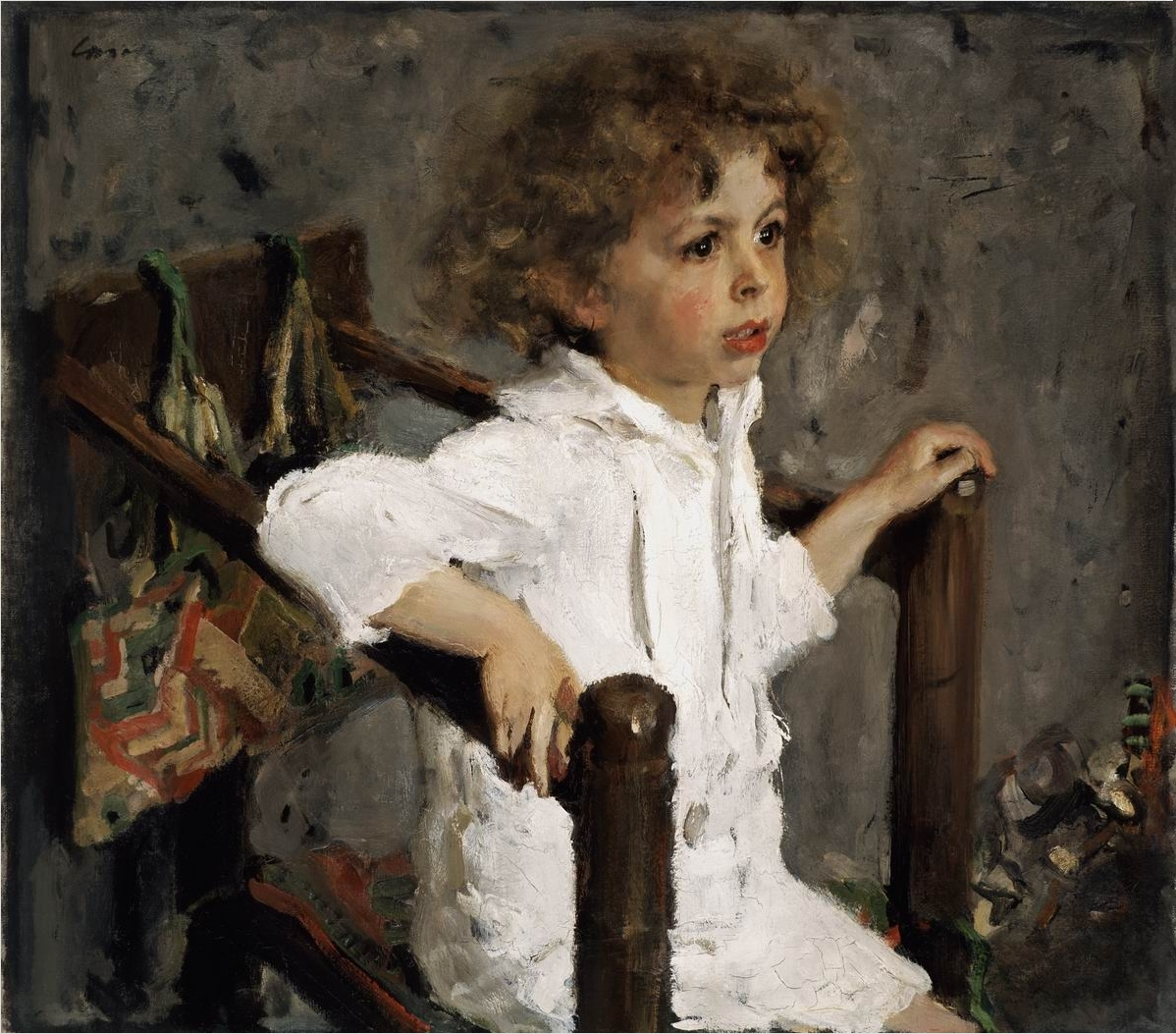
Valentin Serov, Mika Morozov, 1901

== Life ==
Morozov was educated in England; later, he attended Petrograd University. After his studies, he worked at several Russian theaters and also taught English. In 1935, he was made professor at the Institute of Red Professors. He was responsible for teaching Western literature, with an emphasis on William Shakespeare's works. He was a leader in scholarly societies devoted to Shakespeare and organized his first annual conference on the English dramatist in 1939.

Morozov wrote several articles and books about Shakespeare, including literary translations. His work as a translator usually relied on collaboration with others, because he did not consider himself a poet. Among his collaborators were the poets Samuil Marshak, Vil'gel'm Levik, and Vadim Shershenevich. His interlinear prose translations included commentaries and were completely new to Soviet research. His editions of Othello and Hamlet were very well-received. After the Second World War, Morozov published a biography of Shakespeare. He suffered discrimination during the "campaign against cosmopolitanism."
