= Sultanna Frantsuzova =

Russian fashion designer

Sultanna Frantsuzova (Russian: Султа́нна Ива́новна Францу́зова; born January 9, 1975, Elista, Russia) is a Russian fashion designer, known for her inexpensive design clothes.

== Biography ==
Frantsuzova studied at Slava Zaitsev's Fashion Laboratory in Moscow. A year after graduating, Sultanna was named one of the prize-winners of the Nadezhda Lamanova Contest for upcoming designers, and awarded a scholarship to the Fine Arts Academy in Milan (Accademia Scuola di Milano). Her designs were showcased at the Fashion Awards Ceremony in Switzerland.

In 2000, Frantsuzova began design women's collections for the Russian-based brand Lo. In 2003, she created her first independent collection under the name Sortie de Bal, and opened a small boutique in Moscow. In 2004, Frantsuzova launched her own, eponymous label. She soon after moved to Hong Kong and became the creative director for her new brand, Anybody's Blonde. Today, the label Anybody's Blonde operates retail shops across Russia and Asia.

In 2011, she relaunched her brand, Sultanna Frantsuzova, and returned to the Russian market in 2017.

== Awards ==
- 2005: Designer Of The Year by the Russian edition of the Glamour Magazine Awards
- 2007: Designer Of The Year by the Elle Style Awards Russia
