= Mehin =

Mehin or Mahin (Persian: مهين) may refer to:

- Mahin, Syria
- Mehin, East Azerbaijan
- Mahin, Fars
- Mehin, Qazvin

== See also ==
- Mikhin (disambiguation)
