= Portrait of Maria Yermolova =

1905 painting by Russian artist Valentin Serov

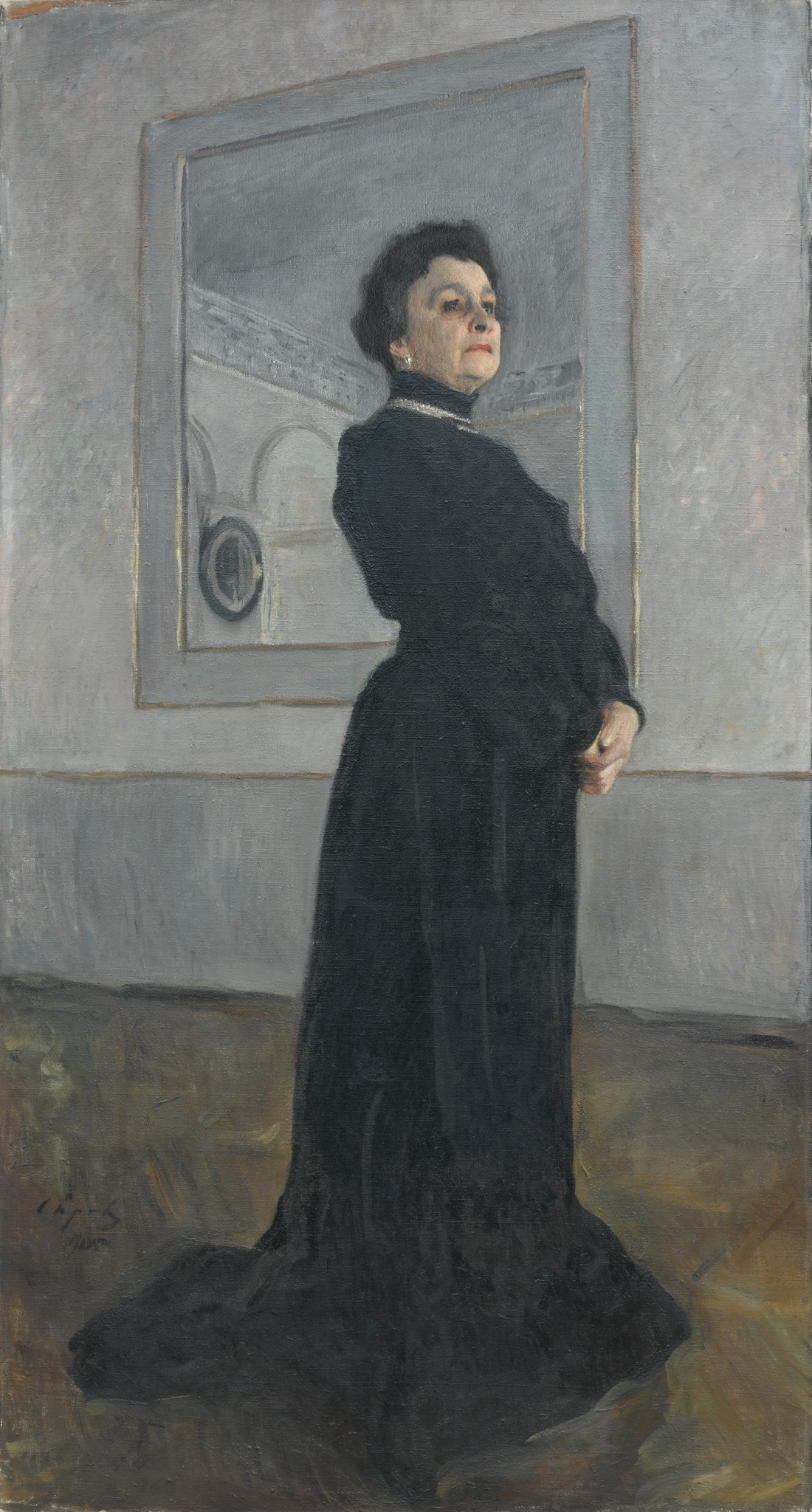
- Artist: Valentin Serov
- Year: 1905
- Medium: Oil on canvas
- Dimensions: 224 cm × 120 cm (88 in × 47 in)
- Location: State Tretyakov Gallery, Moscow

Portrait of Maria Yermolova (Russian: Портре́т М. Н. Ермо́ловой) is a painting by the Russian artist Valentin Serov, completed in 1905. Measuring 224 × 120 cm, it was created to commemorate the 35th anniversary of Maria Nicolayevna Yermolova's debut at the Maly Theatre. The portrait was commissioned and funded by members of Moscow’s literary and artistic community. Work on the painting took place at Yermolova's residence on Tverskoy Boulevard, with the actress posing for thirty-two sessions. The painting was formally presented in 1907 at a banquet held in her honour.

During Serov’s lifetime, the portrait was exhibited at the Tavricheskaya Exhibition (1905), organized by Sergei Diaghilev, and at the Russian Art Exhibition in Paris (1906), as well as at Union of Russian Artists exhibitions. In 1920, it became part of the Maly Theatre’s collection and was transferred to the State Tretyakov Gallery in 1935 (Inv. No. 28079). A known preparatory sketch reveals Serov’s early decisions on composition, perspective, and the monumentality of the image, with particular emphasis on Yermolova’s silhouette.

Created during the First Russian Revolution, the painting reflects Serov’s worldview shaped by events such as Bloody Sunday in 1905. In Yermolova’s image, he sought to express idealized traits associated with Russian humanist traditions. Contemporary responses were mixed—ranging from outright rejection to acclaim as a profound representation of the actress’s creative essence. Film director Sergei Eisenstein later noted that Serov’s compositional choices anticipated cinematic montage techniques.

== Background ==
In 1905, Maria Yermolova was preparing to mark the 35th anniversary of her stage debut. Initially, a charity performance at the Maly Theatre was planned for 30 January. However, the outbreak of the First Russian Revolution and the political unrest that followed led Yermolova to cancel all celebratory events. In response, her friends—members of the Moscow Literary and Art Circle, established by artist Alexander Yuzhin and poet Valery Bryusov— decided to commission a portrait as a tribute. The task of securing the commission fell to artist Ilya Ostroukhov, who also persuaded Yermolova, initially reluctant to "expose herself," to agree to pose for Valentin Serov.

At the time, Serov was one of Russia’s most sought-after portraitists, known for his selectiveness. He often declined commissions unless he felt a personal connection to the subject, once describing himself as a "lazy egoist" who chose what was easiest or most appealing. However, Serov held Yermolova in high regard and frequently attended her performances. Both were known among their close circles as reserved and introspective, a quality that fostered a sense of kinship between them.

Lacking a traditional studio, Serov typically worked in the homes of his sitters. (Note: Some sources mention that some of Serov's apartments in Moscow still contained studios. At the same time, the artist himself wrote that he refused to receive foreign painters who wanted to visit him at home: "They imagine that each of us has the same palaces, studios, etc., as most of them in Paris or Munich. What should I do, where should I invite, what should I show?") Only a few works, including portraits of Yermolova and Fyodor Chaliapin, were painted in his personal space, known as the “Hall.” The main work on Yermolova’s portrait took place at her residence at 11 Tverskoy Boulevard. The house, parts of which date back to the late 17th or early 18th century, (Note: During the restoration of the Yermolova Museum, were discovered bricks dated 1773.) had a reputation for being haunted. It was purchased in 1889 by Yermolova’s husband, lawyer Nikolai Shubinsky, who later emigrated after the October Revolution, while Yermolova remained there for the rest of her life.

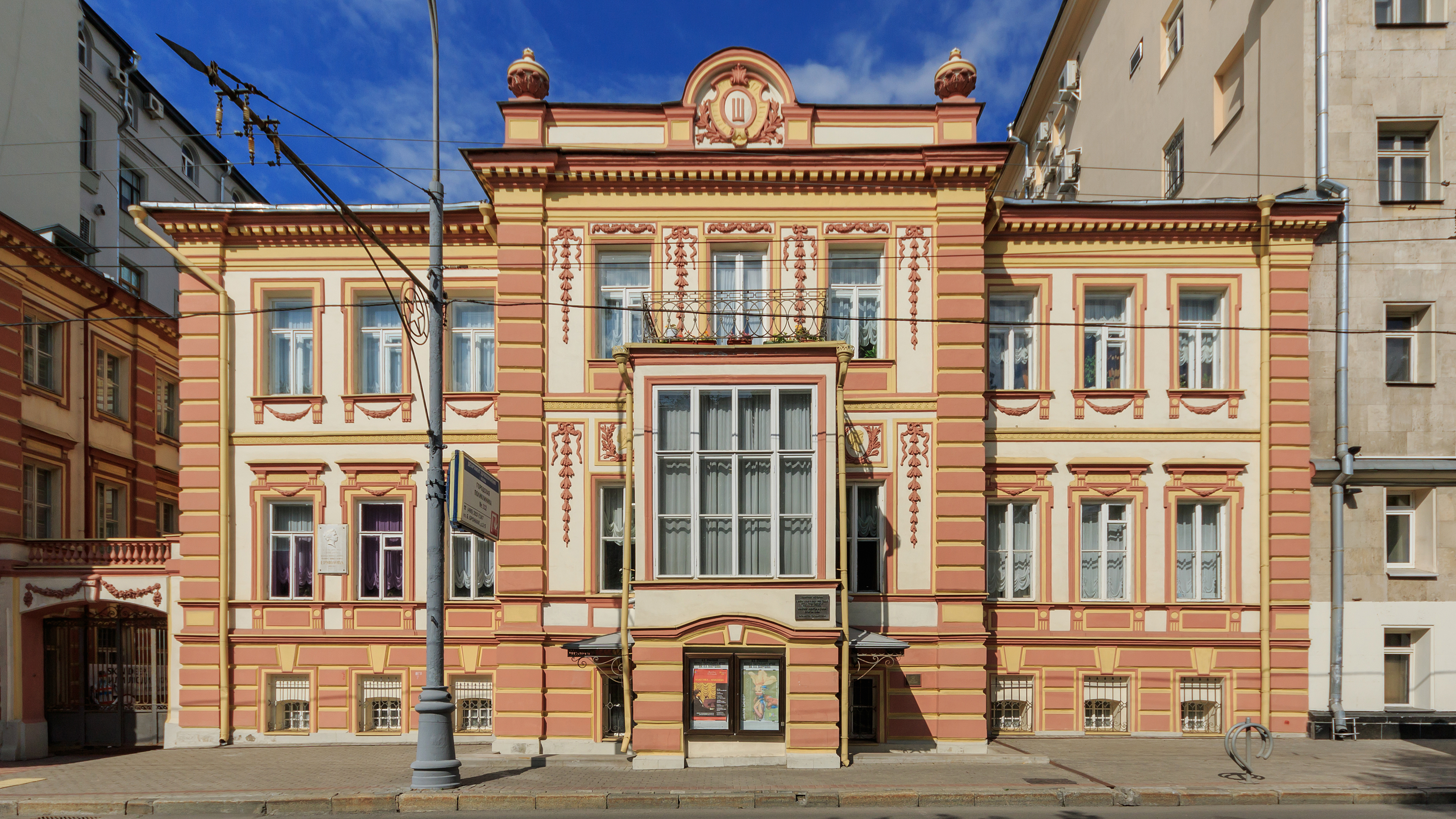
Maria Ermolova's house. Tverskoy boulevard, 11.

The portrait sessions took place in the mansion’s White Hall, a room adorned with mirrors, arches, and moulded cornices. (Note: The information about the date of the work is based on a letter that the art historian Radzimovskaya received from Tatiana Shchepkina-Kupernik in 1949.) Over the course of February and March 1905, Yermolova sat for thirty-two sessions. To achieve a monumental effect, Serov positioned himself on a low bench, so the slightly taller actress appeared elevated, almost statuesque. He later described the experience to art historian Igor Grabar as physically demanding, noting the cramped position and lack of space to step back or even shift. The sessions were conducted in near silence, interrupted only occasionally by Shubinsky’s brief appearances.

In preparation, Serov also observed Yermolova on stage, using these impressions to capture her inner character. He later remarked modestly on the finished work: “But nothing, as if something had come out.” For the portrait, Serov received a fee of 1,000 rubles—substantially less than the 4,000 rubles he received for portraits of Nicholas II and Ida Rubinstein. The sum was collected by Ostroukhov from members of the Literary and Art Circle on 27 February 1905; Serov acknowledged receipt of the payment the following day.

== Location ==
In 1907, Maria Yermolova, exhausted by conflicts within the theatre administration and dissatisfied with the artistic direction of the Maly Theatre, announced her departure from the stage—though this retirement would later prove temporary. On 11 March, a banquet was held in her honour at the Moscow Literary and Artistic Circle. Attended by approximately 300 guests, the event brought together figures such as Nemirovich-Danchenko, Stanislavsky, colleagues from the Maly Theatre, and artists and intellectuals from across Russia. Numerous speeches praised Yermolova’s contribution to Russian theatre; Nemirovich-Danchenko notably described her as "the singer of women's heroism". During the celebration, Serov’s portrait of Yermolova was ceremonially unveiled. In a dramatic presentation, the actress was led into a darkened hall by Professor Bazhenov. As a white curtain dropped, the portrait appeared illuminated on the stage, prompting a wave of applause. The newspaper Russkiye Vedomosti reported that the painting, "effectively illuminated and surrounded by laurels," became the evening’s centrepiece.

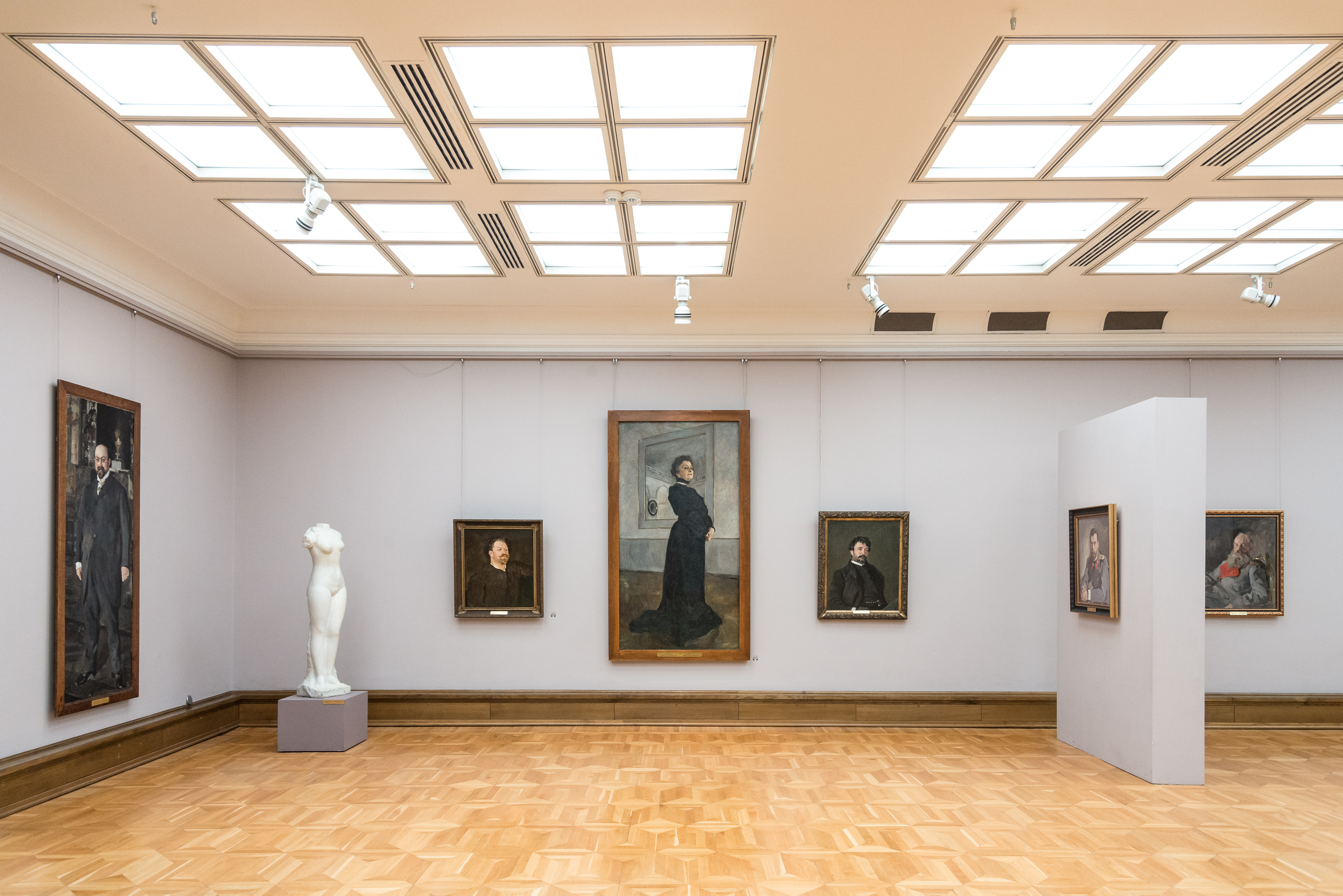
A painting in the hall of the Tretyakov Gallery, 2018.

By then, the portrait had already gained public recognition. It was first exhibited in 1905 at the Tauride Exhibition, organised by Sergei Diaghilev at the Tauride Palace. In 1906, it was shown in Paris as part of the Russian Art Exhibition under the auspices of the Société du Salon d'Automnes. It was also featured in Union of Russian Artists exhibitions across cities, including Moscow, St. Petersburg, Kazan, and Kiev.

External image
- | Catalog of the exhibition in Paris, 1906

The first posthumous exhibition of Serov’s work took place in January 1914 at the Academy of Arts in St. Petersburg and later moved to the Art Salon in Moscow. The Portrait of Maria Yermolova, on loan from the Literary and Artistic Circle, was included among the works on display. When the Circle disbanded in 1920, the painting was transferred to the Maly Theatre.

In 1935, thanks to the efforts of artist Mikhail Nesterov—who considered the painting a masterpiece that should be publicly accessible—the portrait was placed in the State Tretyakov Gallery under temporary custody. After the 70th anniversary exhibitions of Serov’s work at the Russian Museum and the Tretyakov Gallery, Nesterov lobbied successfully for the portrait’s permanent placement in the latter. A formal transfer order was issued in 1949 by the Committee for Art Affairs. At the same 1935 jubilee exhibition, a preparatory sketch of the portrait, executed in pencil and watercolour, was also displayed. (Note: According to some sources, in pencil and ink. Inventory number 11310, size 20.2 × 11.8 cm.)

== Yermolova's representation ==
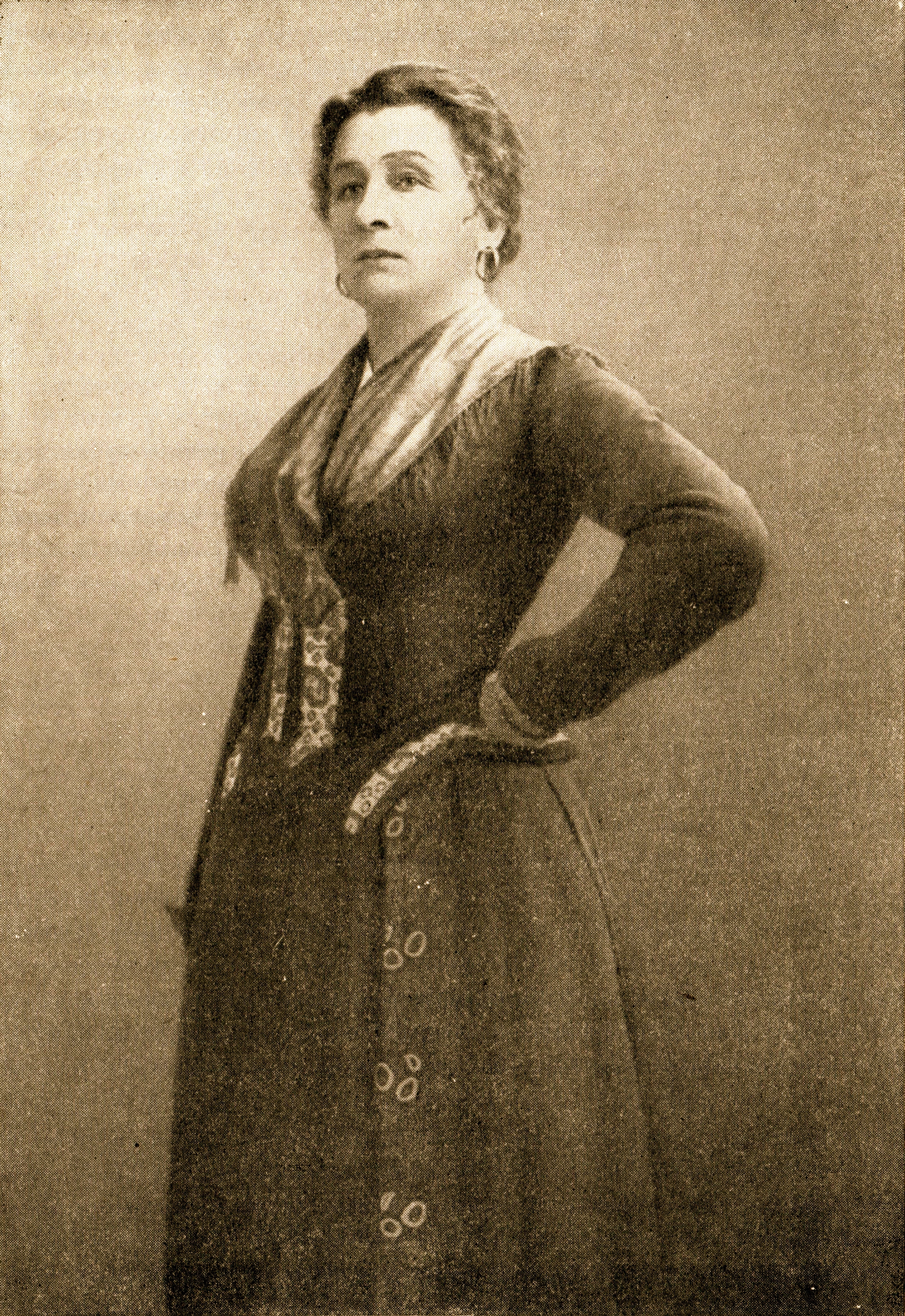
М. N. Yermolova as Yanetta in the play Red Mantle, Eugène Brieux, 1904

In Valentin Serov’s Portrait of Maria Yermolova, there are no overt references to the sitter’s profession—no theatrical gestures, expressive movement, or dramatic facial expression. Yet the painting unmistakably conveys her identity as an artist. Her commanding posture, inner intensity, and the subtle "shadow of tragedy" evoke a spiritual force characteristic of individuals capable of influencing large audiences.

Yermolova was a dominant figure in Russian theatre, revered by generations of spectators. Her authority was such that she could personally select her roles, even for benefit performances. Among her most celebrated portrayals were Maria Stuart in Schiller’s Maria Stuart, Joan of Arc in The Maid of Orleans, and Catherine in The Storm. (Note: And a total of about three hundred roles in fifty years of work in the theatre.) Her realism and emotional power on stage were legendary. According to writer Tatiana Shchepkina-Kupernik, during the premiere of Tatiana Repina by Alexei Suvorin, Yermolova’s performance was so convincing that audience members believed she had actually died, leading to scenes of hysteria and fainting.

At the time the portrait was painted, Yermolova was at the height of her powers—physically vigorous, with a striking, austere beauty. Contemporaries often commented on the expressive depth of her brown, deeply set eyes. Maly Theatre actor Mikhail Lenin described them as “swimming in an endlessly raging sea", expressing a temperament so intense it stirred him to the core. Serov paid close attention to these nuances, capturing what art historian Natalia Radzimovskaya described as the “dominant” quality of her gaze—“extraordinary enlightenment.” Vladimir Lenyashin, director of the Russian Museum, likened the spiritual tension in the portrait to “a fire flickering in a vessel".

Offstage, Yermolova was known for her reserve and concentration, traits reflected in the portrait. She appears composed, yet charged with latent energy—embodying a balance between temperament and emotional discipline. Her hands, carefully posed and interlocked, suggest both dignity and resolve. Their sculptural quality has been compared to the dramatic gestures in Auguste Rodin’s The Burghers of Calais.

Whereas some of Serov’s female portraits resemble lyrical sketches, art historian Igor Grabar described the portrait of Yermolova as “a real drama, even a tragedy". Her figure, erect and imposing, evokes the timeless grandeur of a classical statue, further emphasized by the canvas’s vertical format. Yet the focal point remains her face—proud, serene, and detached from the trivial. The painting’s austere palette, dominated by blacks and greys in varied tonalities, mirrors the actress’s character. Serov’s portrait, though devoid of narrative devices, captures Yermolova’s essence through purely painterly means—expressing the gravitas of a performer who captivated audiences during one of Russia’s most turbulent eras.

== Clothing ==
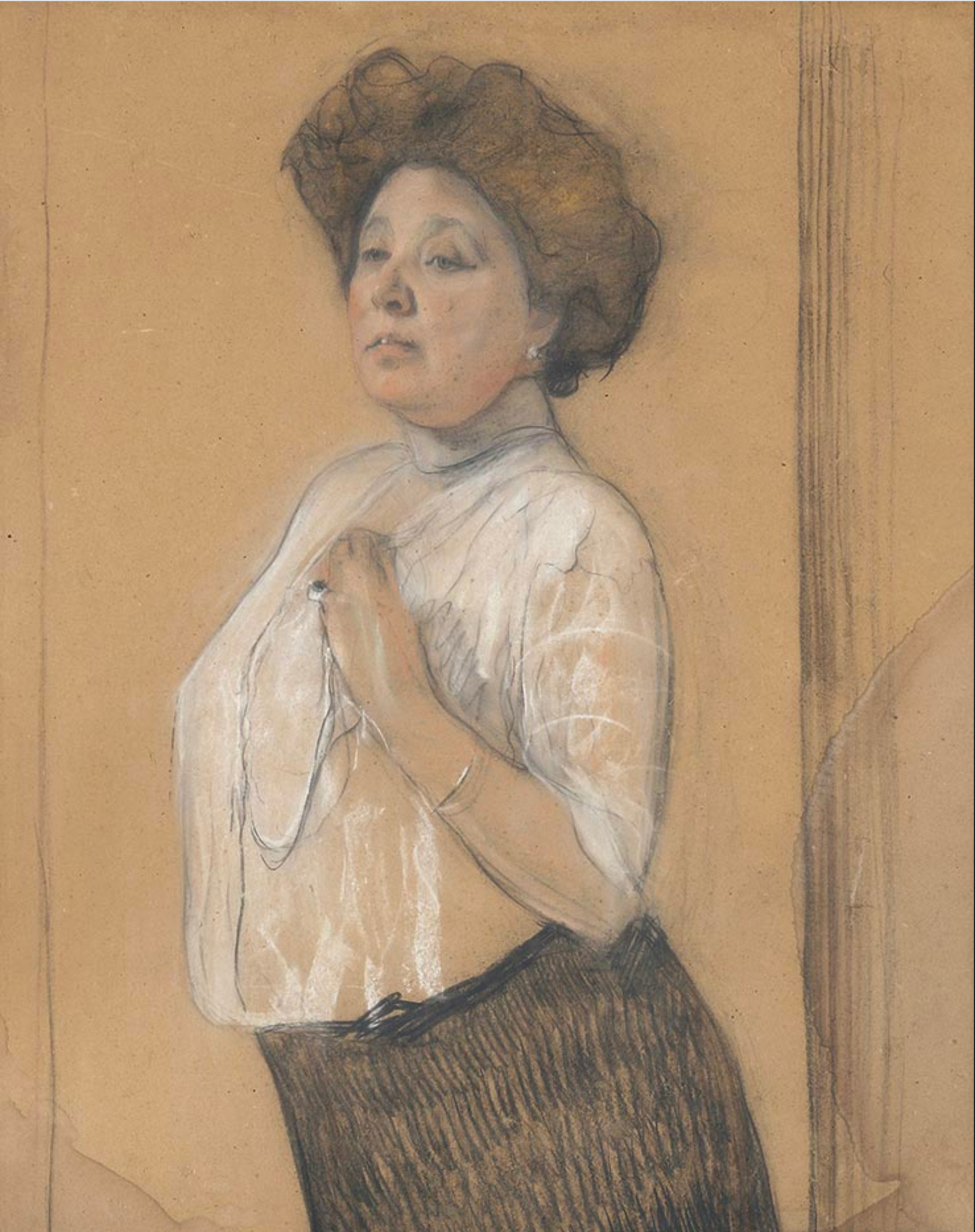
Valentin Serov, Fragment of portrait of N. P. Lamanova, 1911

The black velvet dress worn by Maria Yermolova in Serov’s portrait was designed by Nadezhda Lamanova, a leading figure in Russian fashion. Initially renowned as a high-society dressmaker, Lamanova later became a prominent costume designer for the theatre. Trained in Paris, she opened her own salon at 10 Tverskoy Boulevard, near Yermolova’s residence. Her design process was sculptural in nature, employing the "piecing method"—draping a single length of fabric over the client’s figure and shaping it with pins to create a preliminary sketch. Though Lamanova never sewed the garments herself, considering her role to be that of a creator of images, her vision was realised by the skilled hands of her atelier staff. Yermolova was not the only subject of Russian painting to appear in a Lamanova creation. In 1911, Konstantin Somov painted Yevfimiya Ryabushinskaya in a dress from the same studio. Lamanova’s reputation was such that she found mention in poetry as well; Marina Tsvetaeva famously wrote, “This goddess is marble. / To dress up by Lamanova".

For Serov, capturing the dress was a particularly challenging aspect of the portrait. To avoid tiring the actress, he occasionally worked from a mannequin that replicated her proportions. His goal was to delineate the sculptural contour of the figure while faithfully representing the texture of the fine velvet. Using a conventional brush, he applied black paint with touches of blue, green, and brown in multidirectional strokes. The modelling of Yermolova’s form was further enhanced by a lighting scheme that moved from right to left, creating depth and dimensionality. Highlights on the dress’s folds were rendered with diluted white paint over a black base. The train of the gown, with its reflective hem flowing across the floor, added to the portrait’s sense of verticality and monumentality, visually elongating the figure.

Yermolova’s only jewellery—a pair of pearl earrings and a simple pearl necklace—was rendered with restraint. Serov integrated the pearls harmoniously into the composition, their soft sheen echoing the lighting of the surrounding space and the curved lines of the room. As writer Tatiana Shchepkina-Kupernik recalled, Yermolova would often appear at concert halls in the same outfit: “She would leave in a black velvet dress with a string of pearls around her neck, just as Serov portrayed her".

Serov and Lamanova shared a personal and professional rapport. He frequented her studio, attended her lectures on contemporary fashion, and made sketches of her models. Serov twice attempted to paint her portrait. In early 1911, he completed a coloured pencil sketch, but work was interrupted by Lamanova’s travels abroad. The sessions resumed in autumn, and on the evening of 21 November 1911, Serov made what were likely the final touches to the portrait. The next morning, he died suddenly at the age of 46. Among the wreaths placed on his coffin was one from Maria Yermolova, bearing the inscription: “Eternal memory to the glorious artist".

== Sketch and details ==
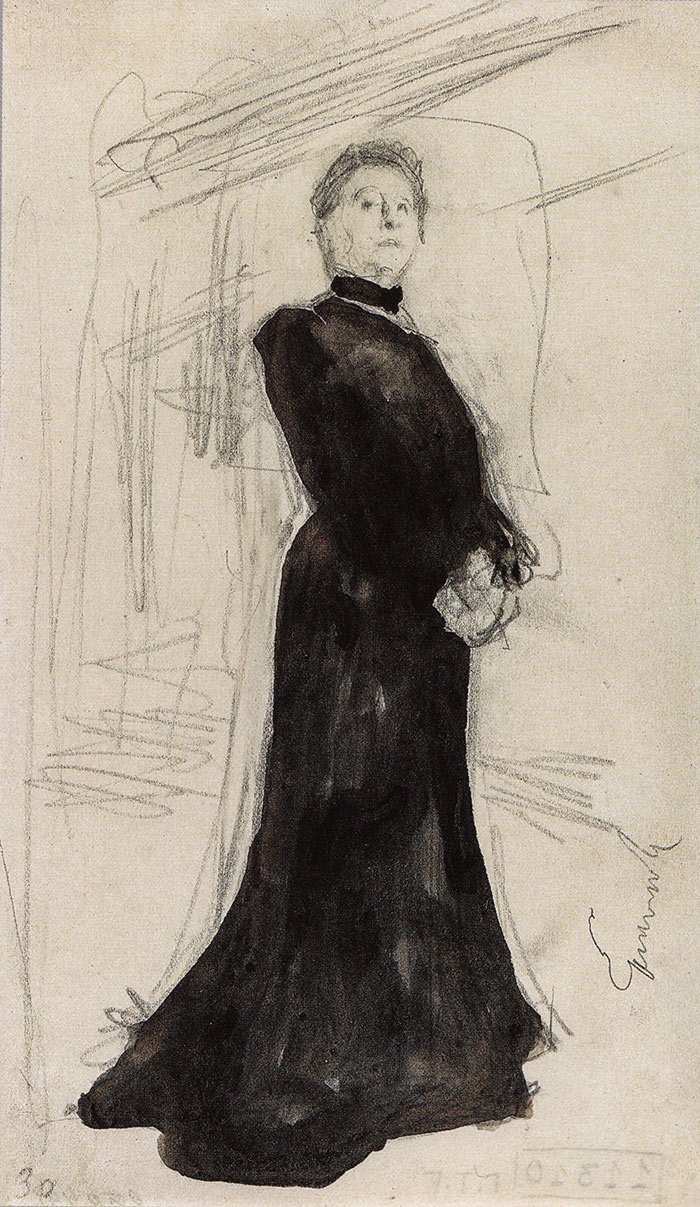
A portrait's sketch

The Tretyakov Gallery holds the only known preparatory sketch for Portrait of Maria Yermolova, executed in graphite pencil and watercolour on paper. This early study reveals Serov’s initial focus on emphasising the actress’s silhouette—dark against a light background, with clearly defined contours. At this stage, however, the facial expression of Maria Yermolova had not yet been developed. The composition was already determined, including the viewpoint from below, which Serov later adjusted in the final painting. The head is eventually shown in a more pronounced three-quarter view, and the shoulders are rendered with greater refinement. The sketch also shows that the artist originally conceived the figure as more compact; the later elongation, which lends the final portrait its monumental character, was a subsequent decision.

Spatial and architectural elements appear only minimally in the sketch, indicating that Serov introduced them during later stages of the painting process. In the completed work, every element serves the portrait’s overall concept. The actress is depicted in a white, neoclassical room devoid of any mundane details, emphasising timelessness over the everyday. Serov deliberately excluded transient or anecdotal features to heighten the image's symbolic and sculptural quality. The painting’s format—224 × 120 cm—was carefully chosen to accommodate both the full-length figure and the architectural setting. The vertical composition allows for a visual "base," created by the depiction of a high floor, which enhances the impression of Yermolova as a monument-like presence. Serov treated the floor and walls with a fluid, almost transparent technique; in places, brushstrokes are scarcely visible. This restraint ensures the background does not compete with the figure but instead frames her with subtlety. Architectural features like mirrors and arches extend and open the space. The curves of the arches echo the lines of Yermolova’s head and hands, reinforcing compositional unity and harmony. Though the painting may appear monochrome at first glance, it contains a complex and carefully balanced colour scheme. Serov used varied tones—black tinged with blue, green, and brown; grey walls with violet undertones; a floor painted with strokes of ochre, blue, and green. These subtle modulations form a coherent palette dominated by grey, black, and brown, accented by muted violet hues visible throughout. This restrained colourism supports the work’s mood of solemnity and grandeur.

Serov personally commissioned an oak frame for the portrait, following the completion of Yermolova’s sketch, and expressed the wish that the painting be protected under glass—a further sign of his regard for the work’s enduring importance. The final composition embodies Serov’s elevated and heroic vision. Its monumental clarity, sparing use of colour, and classical structure all contribute to a portrayal of Yermolova not simply as an actress, but as an enduring cultural figure, rendered with sculptural precision and psychological depth.

== Cinematographic perspectives ==
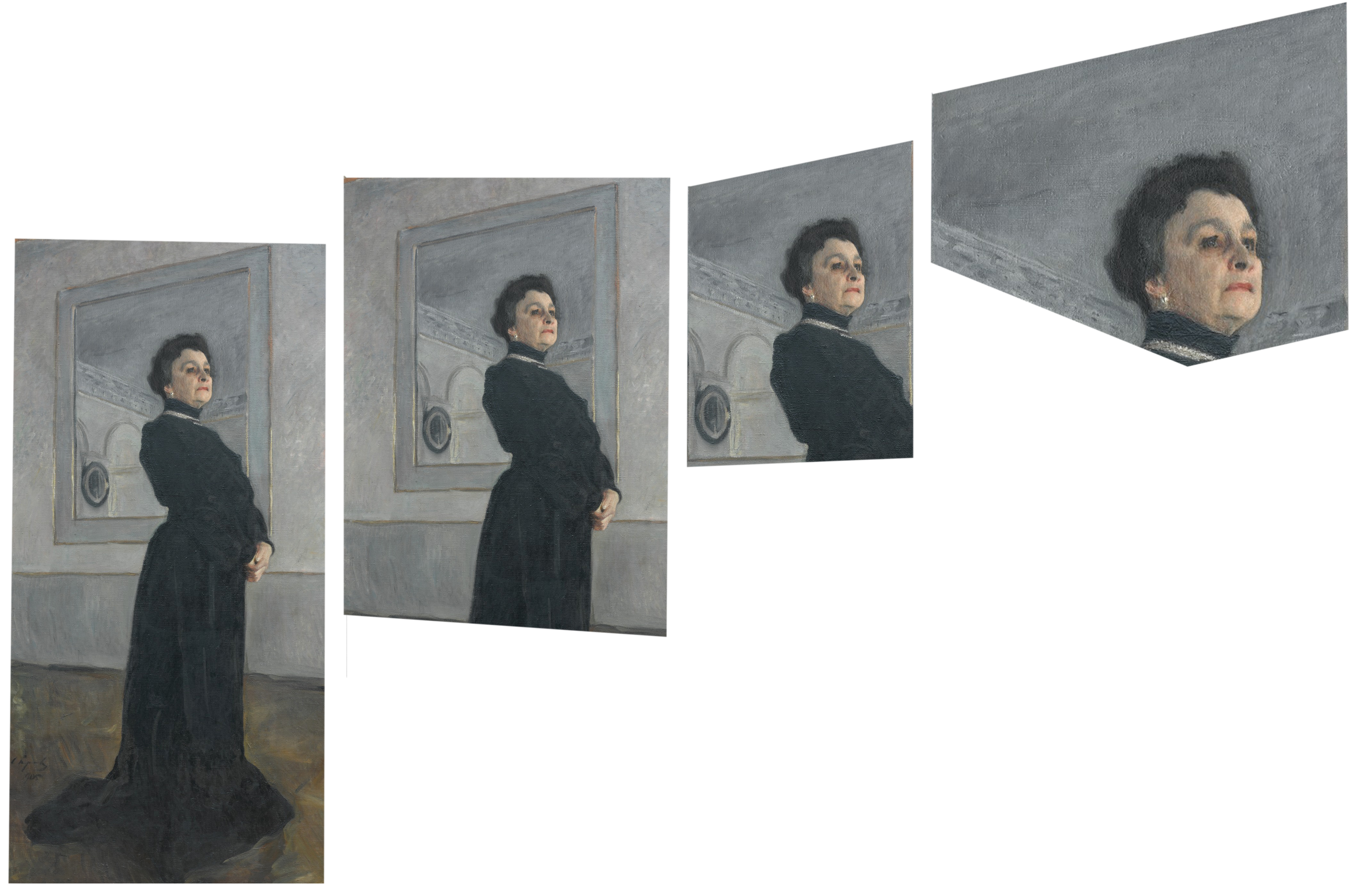
Storyboard of the picture by Sergei Eisenstein.

In 1935, director Sergei Eisenstein saw Portrait of Maria Yermolova at the Tretyakov Gallery. Although he had never seen the actress perform, the painting confirmed for him Stanislavsky’s high regard for her. He remarked on her temperament, sensitivity, and “great nervousness and the inexhaustible depth of her soul.” The portrait, he noted, evoked in him “a very special feeling of exaltation and inspiration,” despite being “extremely modest in colour,” austere in pose, and devoid of props or background details. While many viewers were emotionally moved by the work, Eisenstein was the first to identify the specific compositional technique that conveyed Yermolova’s spiritual intensity: a form of visual montage.

According to his analysis, Serov structured the painting using four distinct viewpoints, visually dividing the figure into separate “frames” by architectural lines—the junctions of floor and wall, the mirror frame, and the ceiling’s reflection. Each section was painted from a different angle: the lower part of the body from above, the knees from eye level, the torso from slightly below, and the head from a low upward angle. The final image, with the actress’s head against the ceiling reflected in the mirror, invites the viewer to look upward. By combining these viewpoints into a continuous whole, Serov created a gradual upward movement of the viewer’s gaze, enhancing the impression of monumentality and inspired ascent. Simultaneously, the composition evokes a downward movement, as if the viewer’s perspective descends toward the base of the figure. This dual motion—rising and falling—generates a dynamic, cinematic rhythm within the still image. The effect is reinforced by spatial and lighting choices: from bottom to top, the space widens, and each successive "frame" shows increasing illumination of Yermolova’s face against a receding background. This progression creates a sense of intensifying radiance and spiritualisation.

Eisenstein believed that Serov arrived at this technique intuitively, without diminishing the compositional logic and precision of the work. He saw the portrait as anticipating the principles of cinematic montage. However, art historian Vladimir Lenyashin offered a more nuanced view. While acknowledging the validity of Eisenstein’s observations, he stressed that the painting remains fundamentally a work of fine art. Its dynamic structure, spatial coherence, tonal richness, and restrained yet intricate colour palette are painterly achievements, eliciting responses rooted in the language of painting rather than film.

== Serov's developing portraiture ==
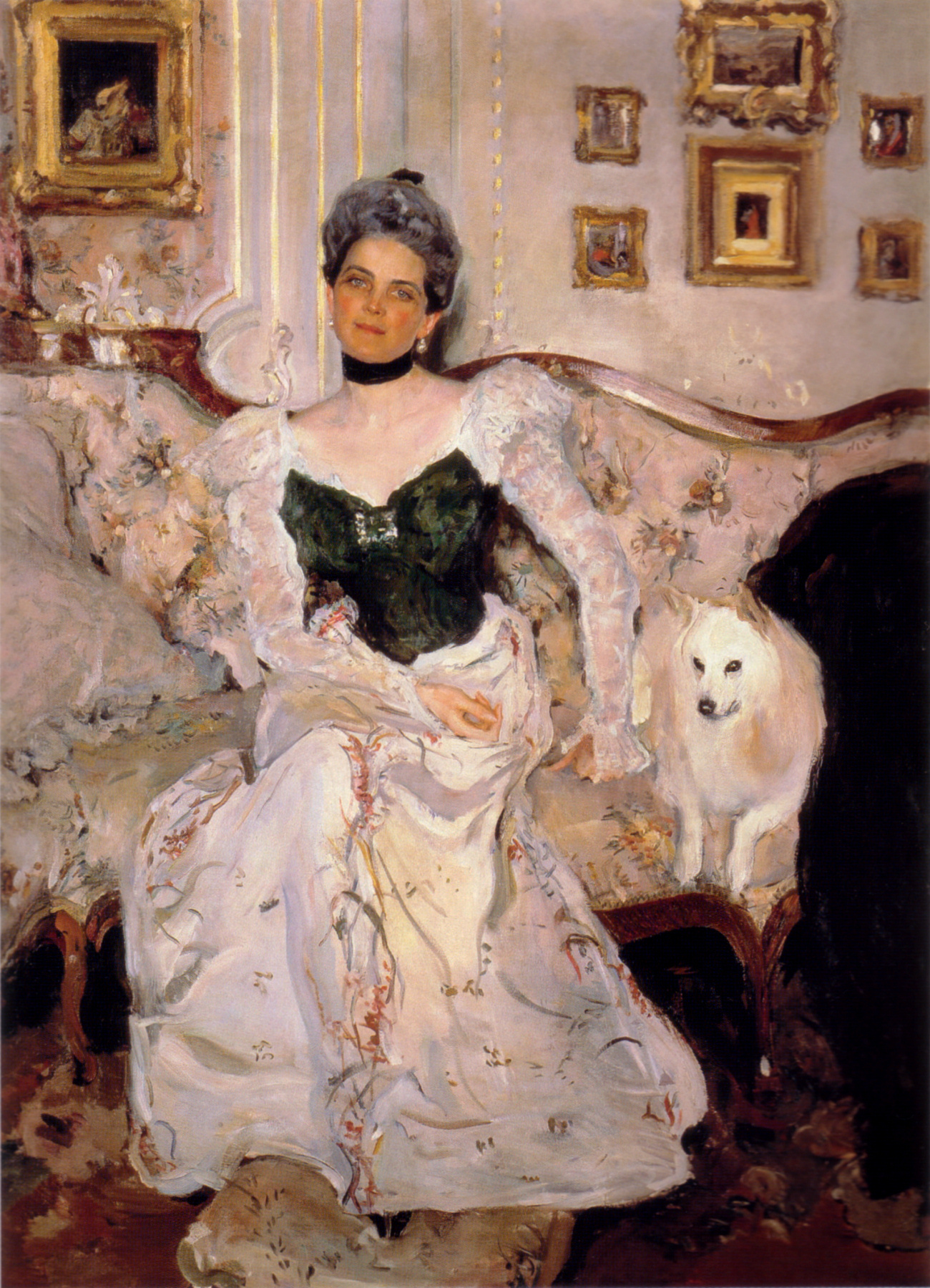
Portrait of Zinaida Yusupova

In Portrait of Maria Yermolova, art historians trace echoes of Valentin Serov’s earlier works. The pronounced silhouette of the actress recalls his 1890s portraits of Isaac Levitan and Varvara Musina-Pushkina, while the sharply defined contours evoke his 1903 “Yusupov cycle.” The compositional rigour and carefully constructed staging also parallel his portrait of the collector Mikhail Morozov.

Despite these links to past work, the Yermolova portrait stands apart in Serov’s oeuvre. Art historian Vladimir Lenyashin referred to it as an "enigma," underscoring its distinctiveness. Compared to the portrait of Zinaida Yusupova painted three years earlier, the contrast in artistic and psychological approach is stark. The Yusupova portrait exudes formality and social decorum, situating the subject within her environment. In contrast, Yermolova is depicted with intense inner energy, detached from any domestic setting. Serov himself seemed to pursue different artistic goals in each case — with Yusupova, he downplayed grandeur; with Yermolova, he asked, "Is enough lifted, elevated?"

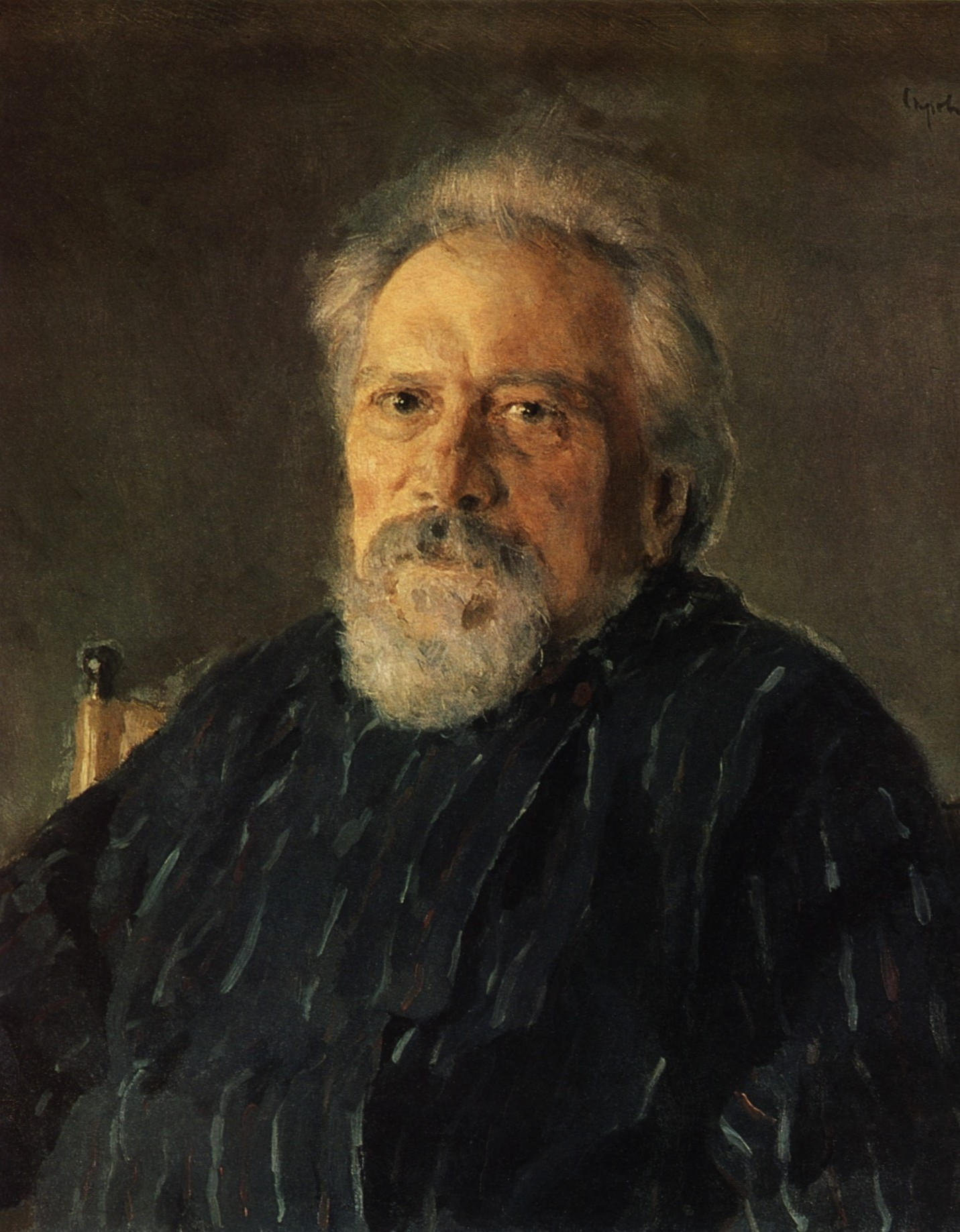
Portrait of Nikolai Leskov

This pursuit reflects a key principle of Serov’s artistic worldview: In the search for man. From the 1890s onward, his work increasingly sought to reveal the ethical and spiritual depth of his subjects. This can be seen in his 1894 portrait of writer Nikolai Leskov — a smaller, introspective work where the subject’s gaze reflects ongoing self-inquiry. Though differing in format, both Leskov and Yermolova’s portraits share a profound inner life, with the latter conveying a psychological intensity likened by scholars to "ancient catharsis". Over time, Serov's interest shifted from youthful beauty to the nuanced expressions of individuals shaped by life experience.

A significant portion of Serov’s legacy consists of portraits of theatrical figures, including not only Yermolova but also Vasily Kachalov, Ida Rubinstein, Konstantin Stanislavsky, and Angelo Masini. His affinity for the theatre began early — his father, composer Alexander Serov, surrounded him with theatrical imagery, and in his youth at Abramtsevo he participated in artistic performances within the Mamontov circle. Later, his collaboration with Sergei Diaghilev led him to create posters for the Russian Seasons and scenic sketches, including for Michel Fokine's Scheherazade. For artists of the Silver Age, the theme of the mask — seen in carnivals, masquerades, and the theatre — symbolised self-expression.

While contemporaries like Konstantin Somov, Mikhail Vrubel, and Léon Bakst explored the mask as a decorative or symbolic motif, Serov took a different approach. As poet Valery Bryusov observed, “Serov’s portraits tear off the masks people put on and reveal the innermost meaning of the face". Yet, Serov did not ignore cultural trends entirely. In Yermolova’s portrait, he blends realism with theatrical symbolism. He simultaneously unveils the actress’s authentic character and frames her as a tragic figure with a ritualistic, almost sacred bearing — a "priest’s mask" emblematic of her dramatic identity. The result is a portrait that merges psychological realism with the symbolic depth of theatrical archetype.

== Figures in black ==
In 1905, alongside Portrait of Maria Yermolova, Valentin Serov painted portraits of Fyodor Chaliapin and Maxim Gorky. These works, along with his 1907 portrait of Leonid Andreev, share a distinctive visual and emotional quality—figures rendered in dark, almost funereal tones. Art historian Gleb Pospelov referred to them collectively as "figures in black." Their emergence coincided with a marked shift in Serov’s outlook, reflecting what some scholars call his "sense of Russia." Whereas early works like Girl with Peaches convey an idealised view of the noble estate life, his portraits from the time of the 1905 Revolution are marked by a darker, more dramatic atmosphere. This shift was deeply personal. On 9 January 1905, Serov witnessed the Bloody Sunday events from the window of the Academy of Arts in St. Petersburg. According to Ilya Repin, the experience profoundly altered Serov’s character. Along with Vasily Polenov, he drafted a letter protesting the violence, pointing out that the head of the Academy was also the commander of the troops involved. On 10 March 1905, while still working on Yermolova’s portrait, Serov submitted his resignation from the Academy; it was accepted in May.

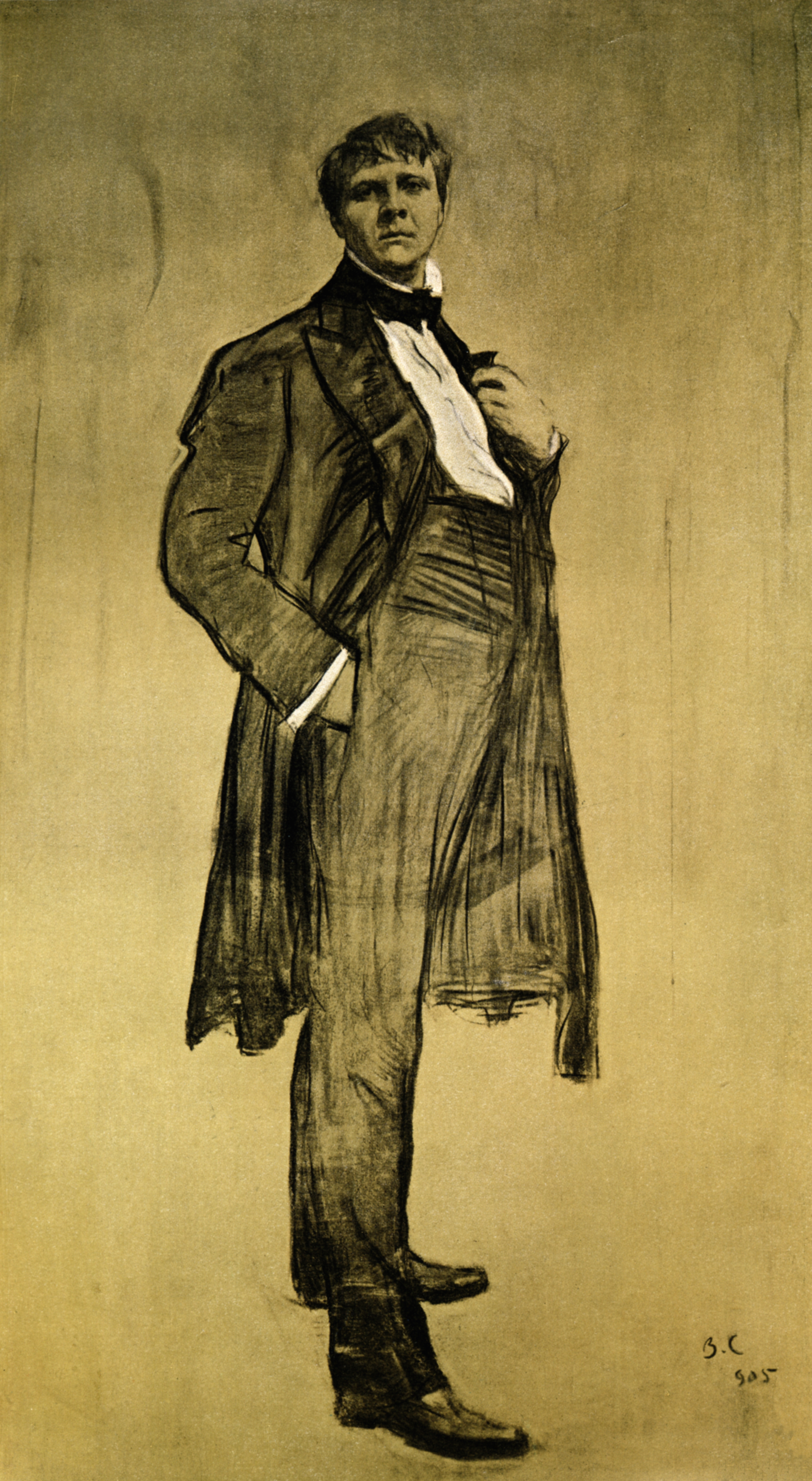
Portrait of Fyodor Chaliapin

The portraits of Yermolova, Chaliapin, and others from this period reflect Serov’s heightened sensitivity to the cultural and emotional state of the nation. He portrayed these figures at moments of heightened inner tension, seeing them as vessels of creative energy on the brink of performance. Chaliapin, in particular, is shown struggling to contain his emotion—his hand reaching for a stiff collar, his eyes dark with feeling. Yermolova appears equally self-contained, distant from ordinary life, projecting a monumental presence that marks the boundary between artist and audience. As Pospelov noted, in these portraits "tragic Russia seems to be listening to itself".

Each of Serov’s "figures in black" is shown alone, against empty or abstracted backgrounds. Gorky and Chaliapin are set against bare fields; Andreev is immersed in darkness; Yermolova is isolated by the stark geometry of walls and mirrors, which draw focus to her intense expression and upright posture. Monumentality is reinforced by the scale of these works—both Yermolova and Chaliapin are depicted nearly life-size (235 × 133 cm), in full height, against vertical canvases that underscore their symbolic stature. For Serov, physical posture carried moral weight. He believed that true artists should remain upright—both literally and figuratively. This belief was tested in 1911, when Chaliapin, during a performance at the Mariinsky Theatre, knelt during the anthem God Save the Tsar!. Serov, who had once portrayed him as a proud and unyielding figure, was deeply disappointed and ceased to greet Chaliapin in public. In his eyes, the gesture was not only politically misguided but a betrayal of the very image they had crafted together—a portrait of the unbending artist.

== Contemporary reviews ==
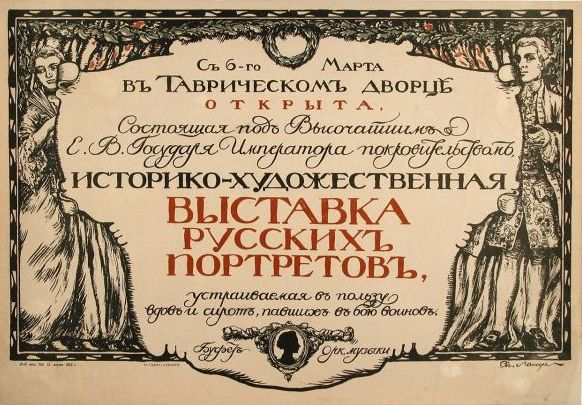
Poster of the Tauride Exhibition, 1905

Valentin Serov’s Portrait of Maria Yermolova received a mixed reception from contemporaries. Members of the actress’s inner circle felt the image made her appear older and less attractive than in real life. According to Tatiana Shchepkina-Kupernik, some relatives found the portrait "unlike" her, and Yermolova herself considered it overly ceremonial, expressing a preference for greater simplicity. Art historians suggest this reaction may stem from Serov’s decision to portray Yermolova in her later years, aiming to capture not her appearance but her inner essence—her "eternal features".

Ilya Repin, considered Serov’s teacher, criticized his student’s recent work in a letter to Vladimir Stasov after seeing the Tavricheskaya exhibition, expressing disappointment. Poet Ivan Aksyonov, who held a low opinion of Yermolova’s acting, echoed this sentiment, quipping that she "always played belly up — and so she stands in Serov’s portrait". By contrast, the critic Nikolai Wrangel praised the painting in Art (1905), describing it as a testament to Serov’s brilliance, calling the portrait a masterful combination of psychological depth, technical skill, and colouristic restraint. Igor Grabar, writing in Vesy (№ 1, 1908), acknowledged the power of the work while noting its "heavy, dull grey and colourless black" palette.

Other figures were more enthusiastic. Literary critic Sergei Durylin called the portrait the finest reflection of Yermolova’s creative persona, praising its depiction of her "high nobility" and "quiet grandeur". Artist Mikhail Nesterov considered it a "perfect work". Shchepkina-Kupernik remarked that while Serov had portrayed her ingeniously, only Rembrandt could have rivalled such a depiction of Yermolova in old age. Architect Fyodor Shechtel described his reaction to the painting as "first cold, then hot", interpreting the work as a spiritual tribute to the actress, calling it "a monument to Yermolova". According to Sergei Mamontov, even a viewer unfamiliar with Yermolova would immediately recognise her as a great dramatic actress. Theatre designer Alexander Golovin went further, claiming that Serov had succeeded in conveying not just her image, but her voice.

== Traditions and influences ==
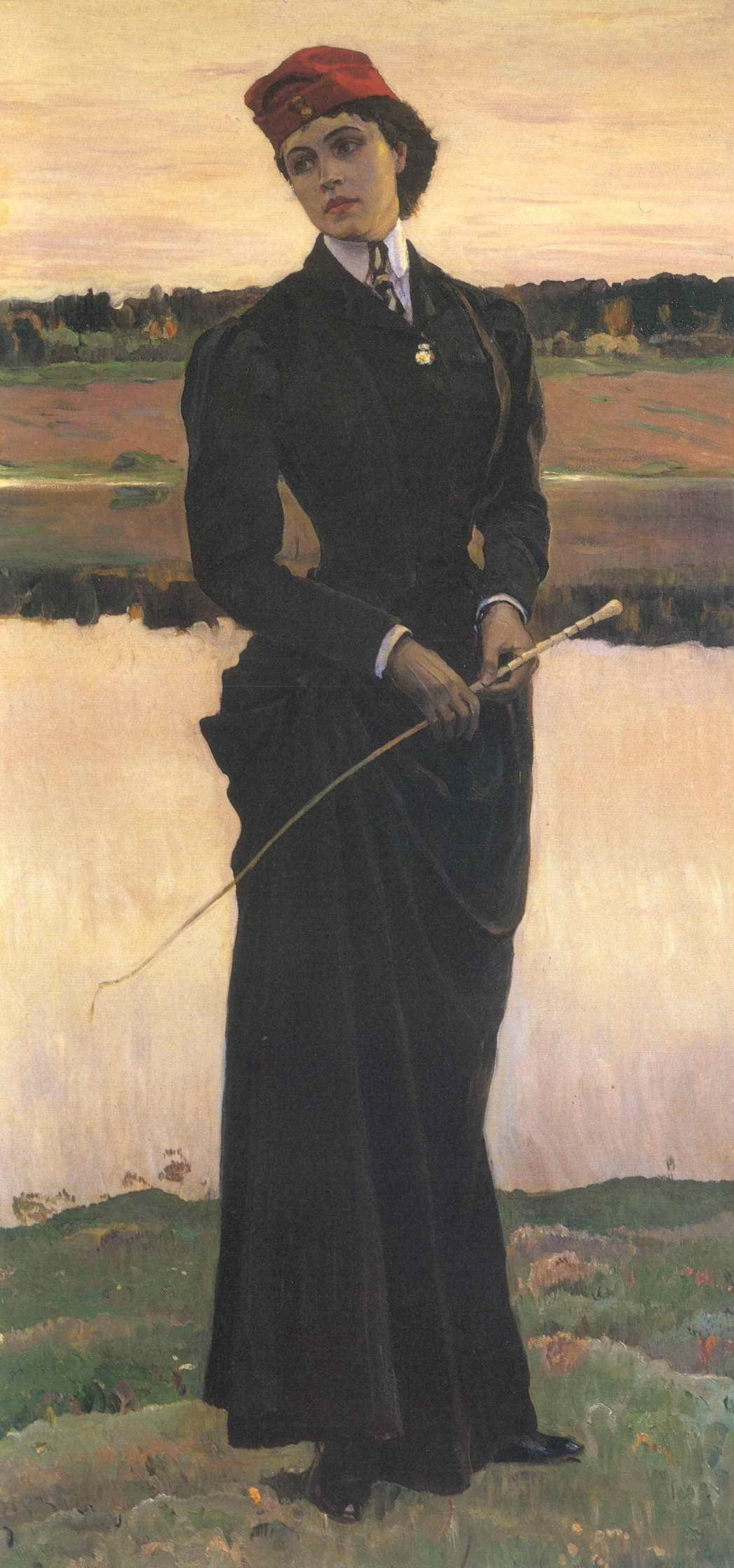
М. V. Nesterov. Portrait of O. M. Nesterova

Serov’s artistic training began in the 1880s, alongside painters such as Vrubel, Nesterov, and Levitan. He developed a close relationship with Konstantin Korovin, who emphasized the need for paintings that resonate emotionally: "We need pictures... to which the soul opens." Serov shared this view, aiming to create "joyful" works. His paintings Girl with Peaches and On the Balcony, Spaniards Leonora and Ampara from the late 1880s share stylistic similarities, blending people, nature, and interiors. Both Serov and Korovin sometimes worked with the same model and concurrently painted early portraits of Fyodor Chaliapin, whom they met in the Mamontov circle.

Art historians note a stylistic connection between Serov’s early 20th-century portraits and those of his teacher, Ilya Repin. However, the mood of Serov’s works is often more melancholic. As Vladimir Lenyashin observed, while Repin’s portraits are uplifting, Serov’s are "always a little heartbreaking". Despite his affection for Serov, Repin criticized some of his works as rough and careless. The Portrait of Yermolova reflects Serov’s artistic evolution, blending influences from both the Peredvizhniki (realist) and Mir Iskusstva (aesthetic) movements. The First Russian Revolution provided a catalytic influence on Serov's work, infusing his style with monumentality and social depth, as noted by Dmitry Sarabianov.

Yermolova had been a subject of portraiture before Serov, with artists like Victor Bykovsky, Sergei Yaguzhinsky, and Leonid Pasternak having painted her in the 19th century. However, Serov infused her image with a humanistic, social dimension. His innovative use of space, angles, colours, and textures in portraits such as Yermolova had a lasting impact on future artists.

Serov’s Portrait of Yermolova is regarded as a pinnacle of heroic portraiture, offering a unique and deeply humanistic portrayal. His distinctive style and compositional techniques influenced not only his students but also artists beyond painting.[9] It is possible that Serov’s portrait inspired Mikhail Nesterov’s 1906 Portrait of O. M. Nesterova, which shares similar stylistic elements, such as the full-length figure, strong black silhouettes, and similar head and hand positions. Nesterov, who saw Serov's portrait at an exhibition, was profoundly influenced by it, though the moods of the two works differ.

In 2015, the State Tretyakov Gallery hosted a special exhibition marking the 150th anniversary of Serov's birth, featuring key works that cemented his reputation as one of Russia’s leading portraitists, including Portrait of M. N. Yermolova. In 2016, the painting was displayed at the National Portrait Gallery in London as part of the Russia and Art: the Age of Tolstoy and Tchaikovsky exhibition. A columnist for the Guardian described the portrait as "a virtuoso performance by both actress and artist.

== Bibliography ==
- Bruk Ya. V., Iovleva L. I. (2005). Государственная Третьяковская галерея: Живопись XVIII—XX веков [State Tretyakov Gallery: Painting of the XVIII-XX centuries]. Государственная Третьяковская Галерея. Каталог собрания (in Russian). Vol. 5. Красная площадь. p. 528. ISBN 5-93221-089-3
- Woolf V., Chebotar S. (2013). "Звезды", покорившие миллионы сердец ["Stars" who conquered millions hearts]. Великие женщины XX века. Незабываемые книги Виталия Вульфа (in Russian). М.: Эксмо. p. 720. ISBN 978-5-699-67977-5.
- Gomberg-Verzhbinskaya E. P. (1969). Искания в русской живописи 1890—1900 годов // Русская художественная культура конца XIX — начала XX веков (1895—1907) [Searchings in Russian painting of 1890-1900 years // Russian art culture of the end of XIX - beginning of XX centuries (1895-1907)] (in Russian). Vol. 2. М.: Наука. pp. 63–128.
- Gryaznov, А. (1982). Почётный гражданин Москвы: страницы жизни Павла Михайловича Третьякова [Honoured Citizen of Moscow: pages of Pavel Mikhailovich Tretyakov's life] (in Russian). М.: Московский рабочий. p. 189.
- Daniel, S. M. (1990). Искусство видеть. О творческих способностях восприятия, о языке линий и красок и о воспитании зрителя [The Art of Seeing. On the artistic powers of perception, on the language of lines and colours and on the education of the viewer] (in Russian). Л.: Искусство. p. 223. ISBN 5-210-00035-4
- Durylin, S. N. (1953). Мария Николаевна Ермолова. 1853—1928. Очерк жизни и творчества / Редакторы Н. И. Игнатова, А. Т. Лифшиц [Maria Nikolayevna Yermolova. 1853-1928. Sketch of life and work] (in Russian). М.: Издательство Академии Наук СССР. p. 650.
- Ilina, T. V. (2010). История отечественного искусства от Крещения Руси до начала третьего тысячелетия: учебник для вузов [History of Russian Art from the Baptism of Russia to the Beginning of the Third Millennium: textbook for universities] (in Russian). М.: Юрайт. p. 473. ISBN 978-5-9916-0242-6.
- Kopshitser, М. I. (1972). Валентин Серов [Valentin Serov]. Жизнь в искусстве (in Russian). М.: Искусство.
- Lapshin, V. P. (1995). Валентин Серов. Последний год жизни [Valentin Serov. The last year of life] (in Russian). М.: Галарт. p. 544. ISBN 5-269-00306-6
- Lenyashin, V. A. (1986). Портретная живопись В. А. Серова 1900-х годов. Основные проблемы [Portraiture of V. A. Serov in the 1900s. Main problems] (in Russian). Л.: Художник РСФСР. p. 260.
- Muravyov, V. B. (2014). Повести Тверского бульвара [The Tverskoy Boulevard Stories]. Большая Московская Библиотека (БМБ) (in Russian). Vol. 2. М.: Русскій Міръ: Жизнь и мысль. ISBN 978-5-8455-0167-7.
- Pospelov, G. G. (1999). Русское искусство начала XX века. Судьба и облик России [Russian art of the early XX century. The fate and image of Russia] (in Russian). М.: Наука. p. 128. ISBN 5-02-011745-5
- Prokopov, Т. F. (2018). Валентин Серов. Любимый сын, отец и друг: Воспоминания современников о жизни и творчестве выдающегося художника [Valentin Serov. Favourite son, father and friend: Memories of contemporaries about the life and work of the outstanding artist]. Портрет эпохи (in Russian). М.: АСТ. p. 220. ISBN 978-5-17-105716-9.
- Pruzhan I. N., Knyazev V. P. (1980). Русский портрет конца ХXIX — начала XX века. Живопись. Графика [Russian portrait of the late XIX - early XX century. Painting. Graphics] (in Russian). М.: Изобразительное искусство. p. 296.
- Radzimovskaya, N. V. (1956). А. Серов. Портрет М. Н. Ермоловой // Государственная Третьяковская галерея. Материалы и исследования [А. Serov. Portrait of M. N. Yermolova] (in Russian). Vol. 1. М.: Советский художник. pp. 209–224.
- Malkina, М. A. (2000). М. Н. Ермолова: маска и её отражение // Маска и маскарад в русской культуре XVIII — XX веков: сборник статей [М. N. Yermolova: mask and its reflection // Mask and masquerade in Russian culture of the XVIII - XX centuries: collection of articles] (in Russian). Гос. ин-т искусствознания. pp. 95–105.
- Chugunov, G. I. (1990). Валентин Серов в Петербурге / рецензент — кандидат искусствоведения И. Н. Пружан [Valentin Serov in St. Petersburg / reviewed by candidate of art history I. N. Pruzhan]. Выдающиеся деятели науки и культуры в Петербурге — Петрограде — Ленинграде (in Russian). Л.: Лениздат. p. 256. ISBN 5-289-00607-9
- Schepkina-Kupernik, T. L. (1983). Ермолова [Yermolova]. Жизнь в искусстве (in Russian). М.: Искусство. p. 192.
- Eisenstein, S. M. (1964). Избранные произведения: в 6 т. [Selected Works: In 6 vols.] (in Russian). Vol. 2. М.: Искусство. p. 567.
- Eisenstein, S. M. (1998). Эйзенштейн о монтаже // Монтаж [Eisenstein on montage // Montage]. Памятники кинематогр. мысли (in Russian). М.: ВГИК. ISBN 5-87149-038-7.
- Выставка произведений В. А. Серова. 1865—1911 [Exhibition of the V. A. Serov's works. 1865-1911] (in Russian). М.: ГТГ. 1935. p. 88.
- История русского искусства [The History of Russian Art] (in Russian). Vol. 10, book 1. М.: Наука. 1968.
- Валентин Серов в воспоминаниях, дневниках и переписке современников. Сборник в 2 томах / Сост. И. С. Зильберштейн, В. А. Самков [Valentin Serov in memoirs, diaries and correspondence of contemporaries. Collection in 2 volumes] (in Russian). Vol. 1. Л.: Художник РСФСР. 1971. p. 717.
- Валентин Серов в воспоминаниях, дневниках и переписке современников. Сборник в 2 томах / Сост. И. С. Зильберштейн, В. А. Самков [Valentin Serov in memoirs, diaries and correspondence of contemporaries. Collection in 2 volumes] (in Russian). Vol. 2. Л.: Художник РСФСР. 1971. p. 600.
- Валентин Серов в переписке, документах и интервью. Сборник в 2 томах / Сост. И. С. Зильберштейн, В. А. Самков [Valentin Serov in correspondence, documents and interviews. Collection in 2 volumes] (in Russian). Vol. 2. Л.: Художник РСФСР. 1989. p. 432. ISBN 5-7370-0210-1
