= Museum of Vera Mukhina =

Historical and art museum in Feodosia, Crimea

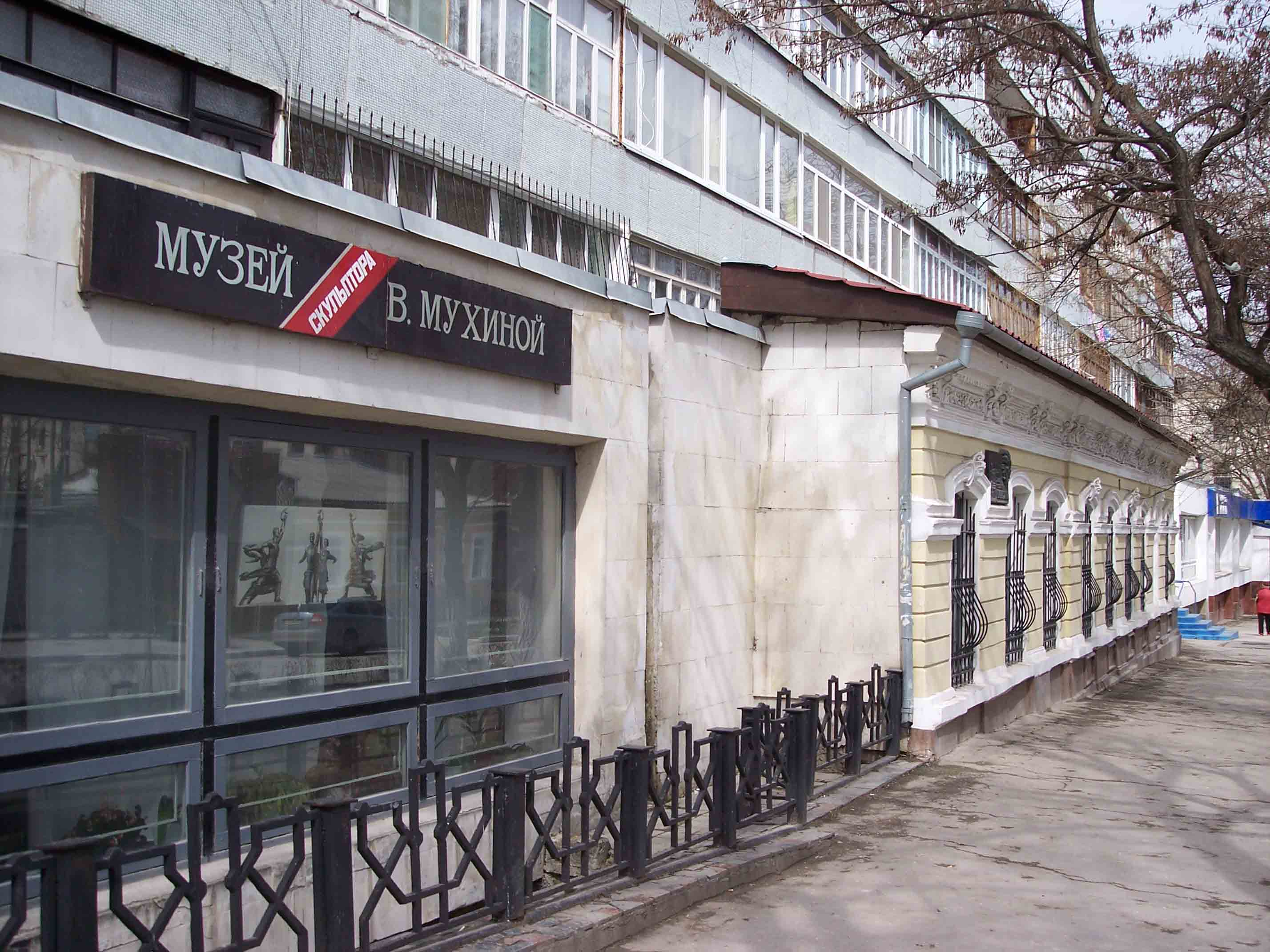
- Museum of Sculptor Мukhina V.I.
- Established: April 12, 1985
- Location: 1 Fed’ko St., Feodosia, Crimea
- Coordinates: 45.04106°N 35.37792°E
- Type: Historical and Art museum

The Museum of Vera Mukhina is a historical and art museum in Feodosia, Crimea, dedicated to the childhood, youth and artwork of sculptor Vera Ignatyevna Mukhina.

== History ==
The folk museum of sculptor Vera Mukhina, or the Museum complex "The Child's seascape painter Gallery, Museum of sculptor V. Mukhina" was established in a house of Mukhin's family. A wall of the Mukhin's old house was successfully included in the main facade of the museum building. A local administration made a decision to not completely destroy Mukhin's former house when a new block of houses was constructed at the end of 20th century. So, the original wall now decorates a modern museum. A memorial room of V. Mukhina and a part of her creative workshop were recreated with period furniture and instruments.

== Exposition ==
The main part of the museum displays exhibits from the first half of the 20th century.

=== Sculptures ===
The pride of the museum is a layout of the sculptural composition Worker and Kolkhoz Woman which was presented at the Paris Exhibition of 1937.

== Gallery ==
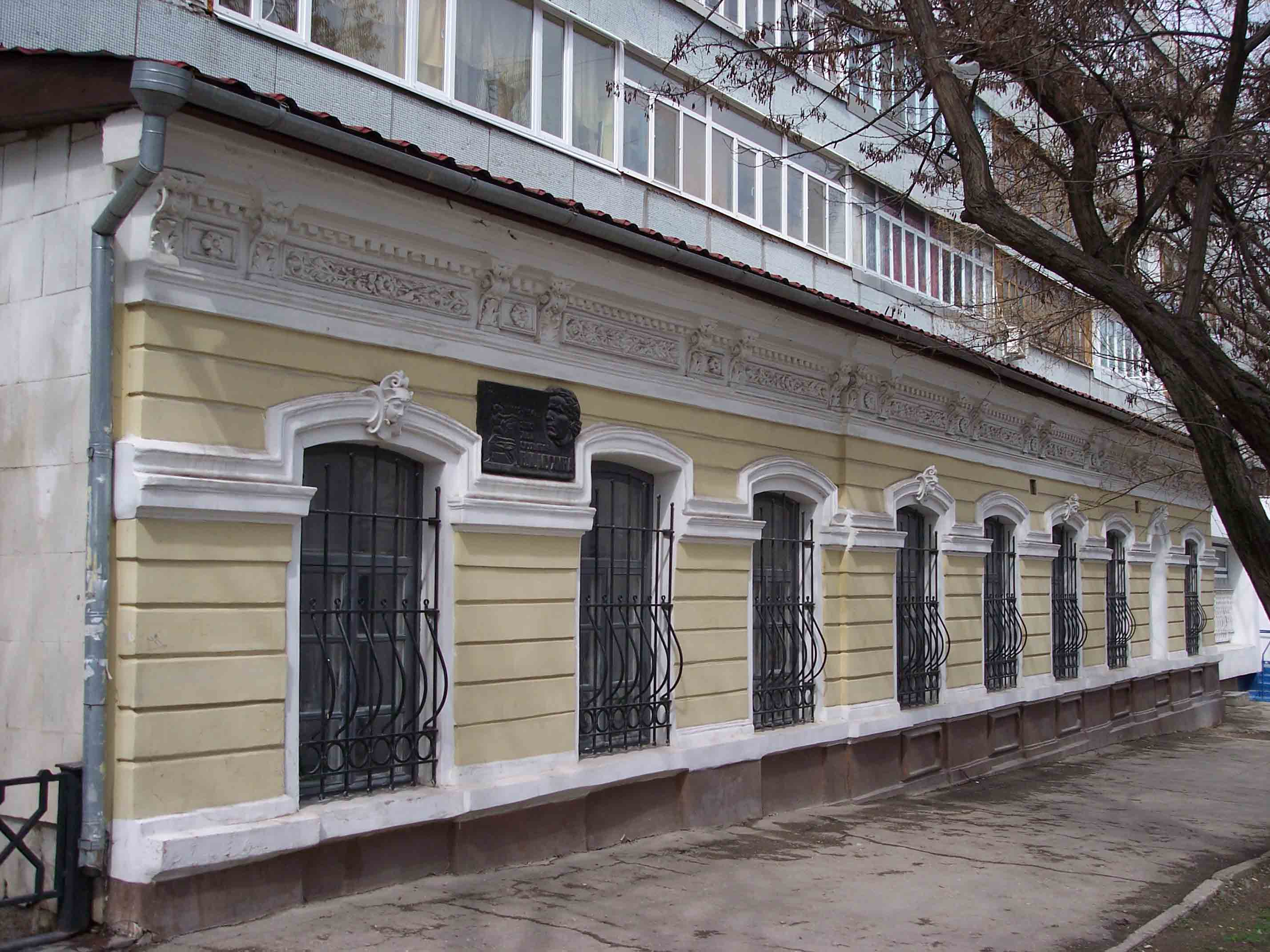
Facade wall of Mukhin's house, Feodosiya, Crimea.

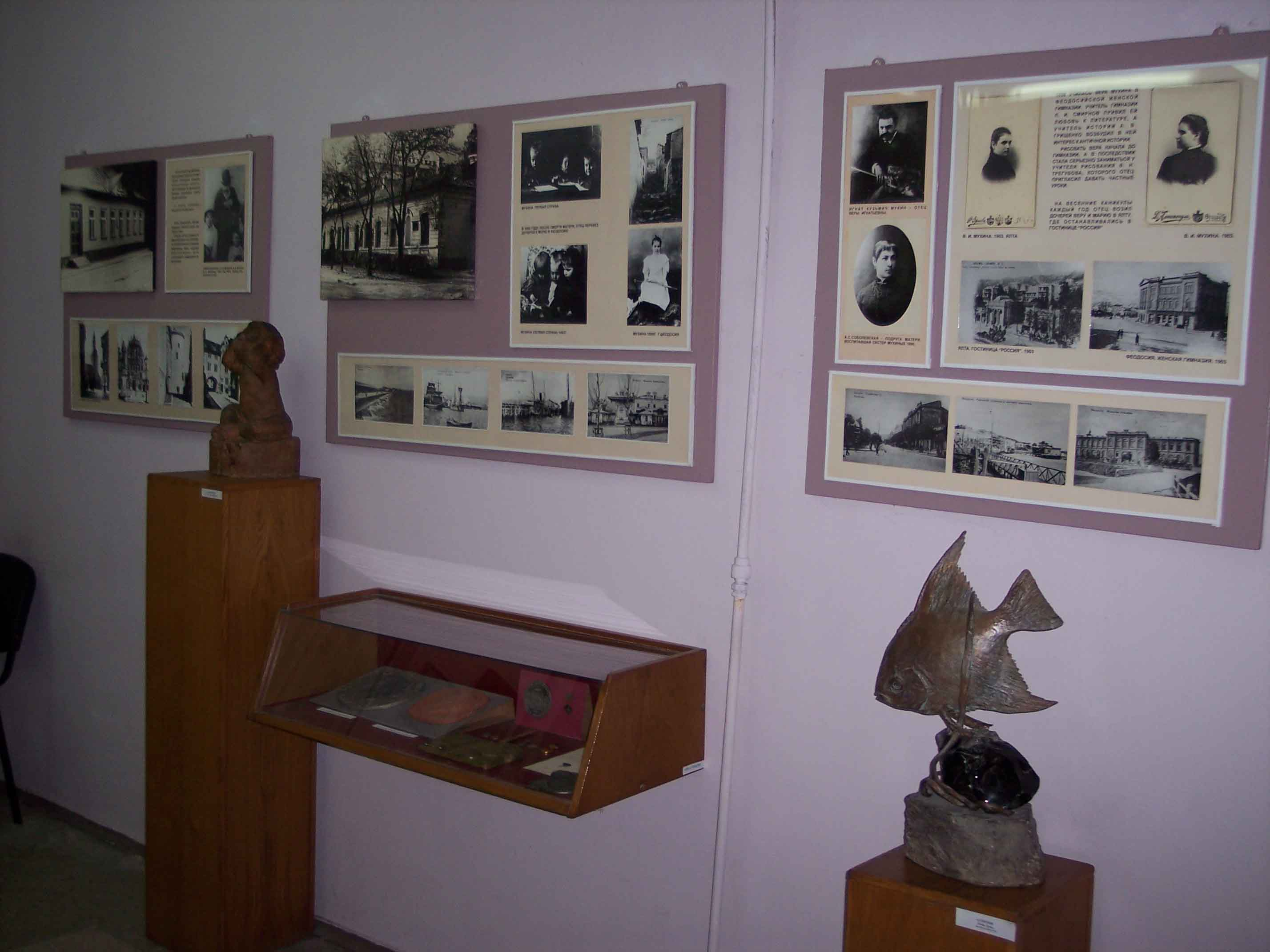
Museum of sculptor V.Мukhina, display 01, Feodosiya, Crimea.

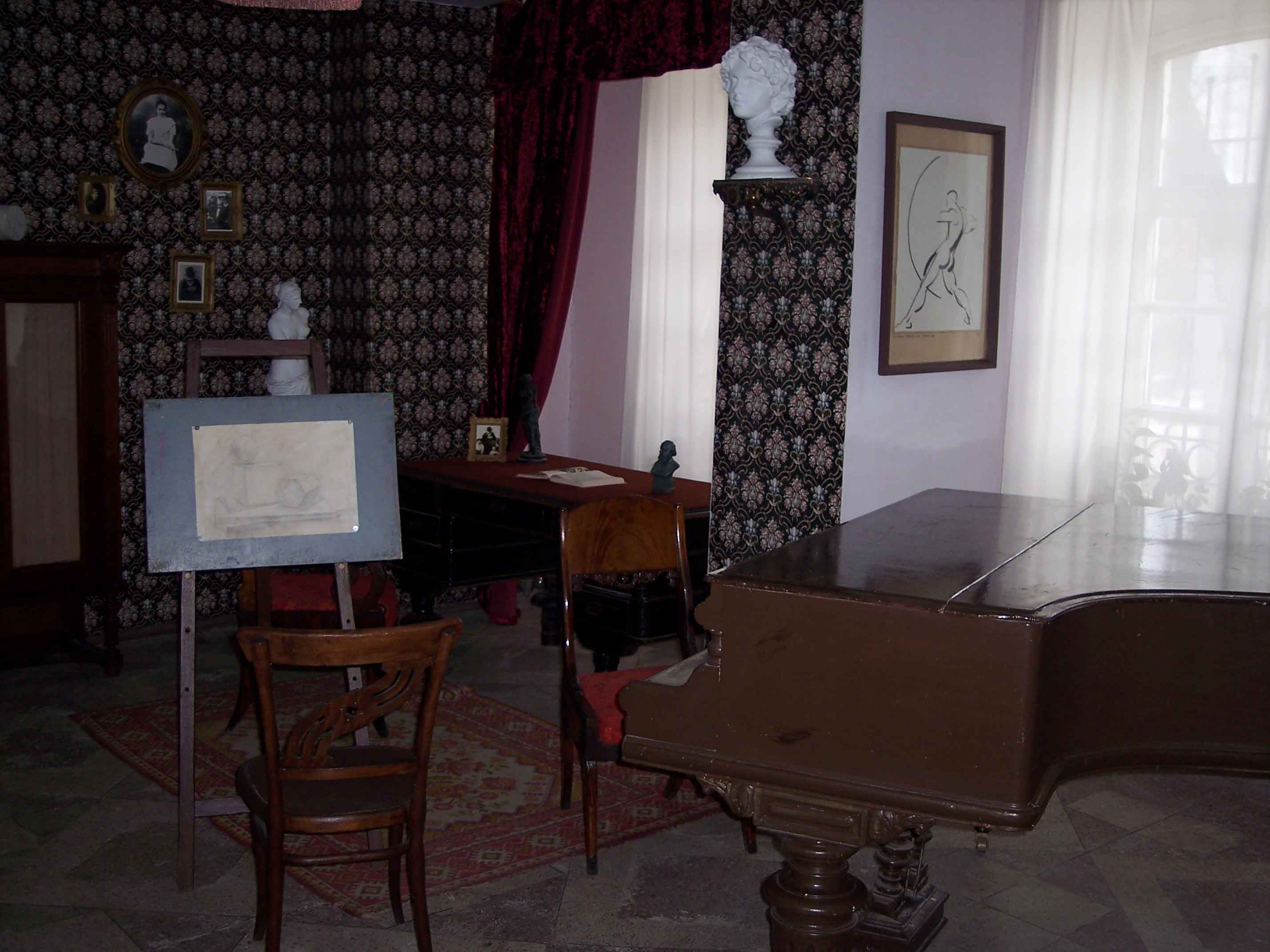
Museum of sculptor V.Мukhina, display 02, Feodosiya, Crimea.

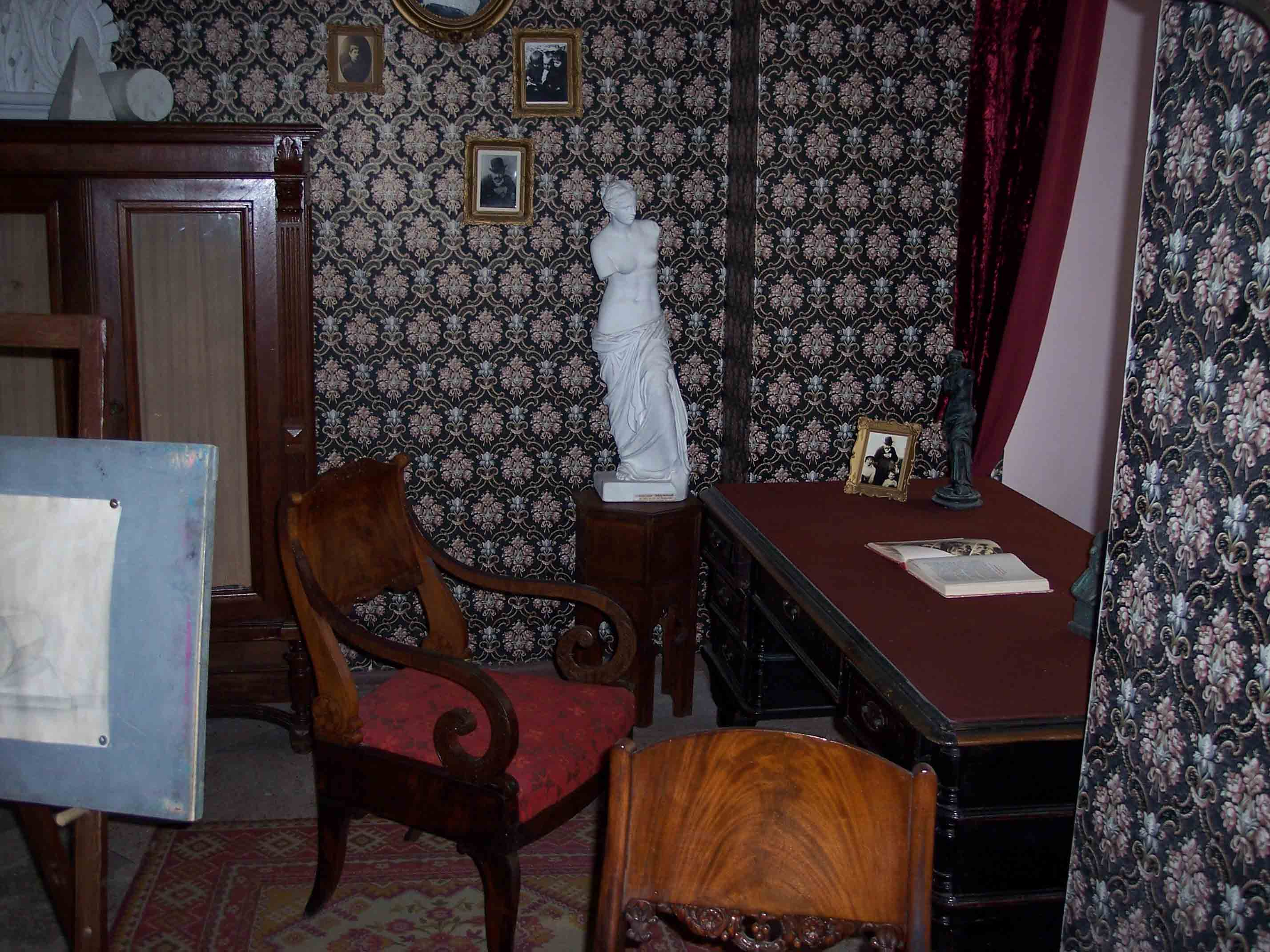
Museum of sculptor V.Мukhina, display 03, Feodosiya, Crimea.

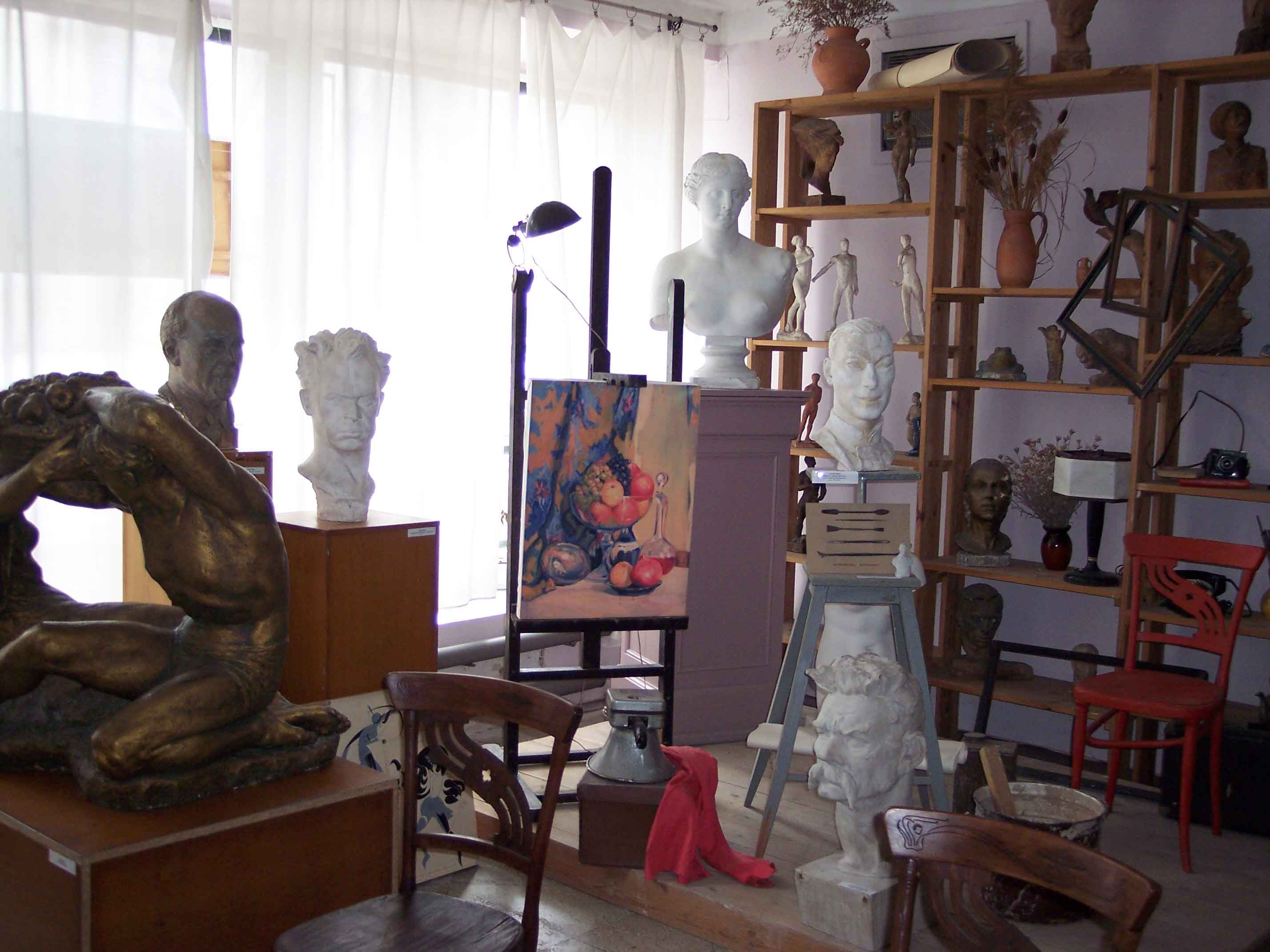
Museum of sculptor V.Мukhina, display 04, Feodosiya, Crimea.

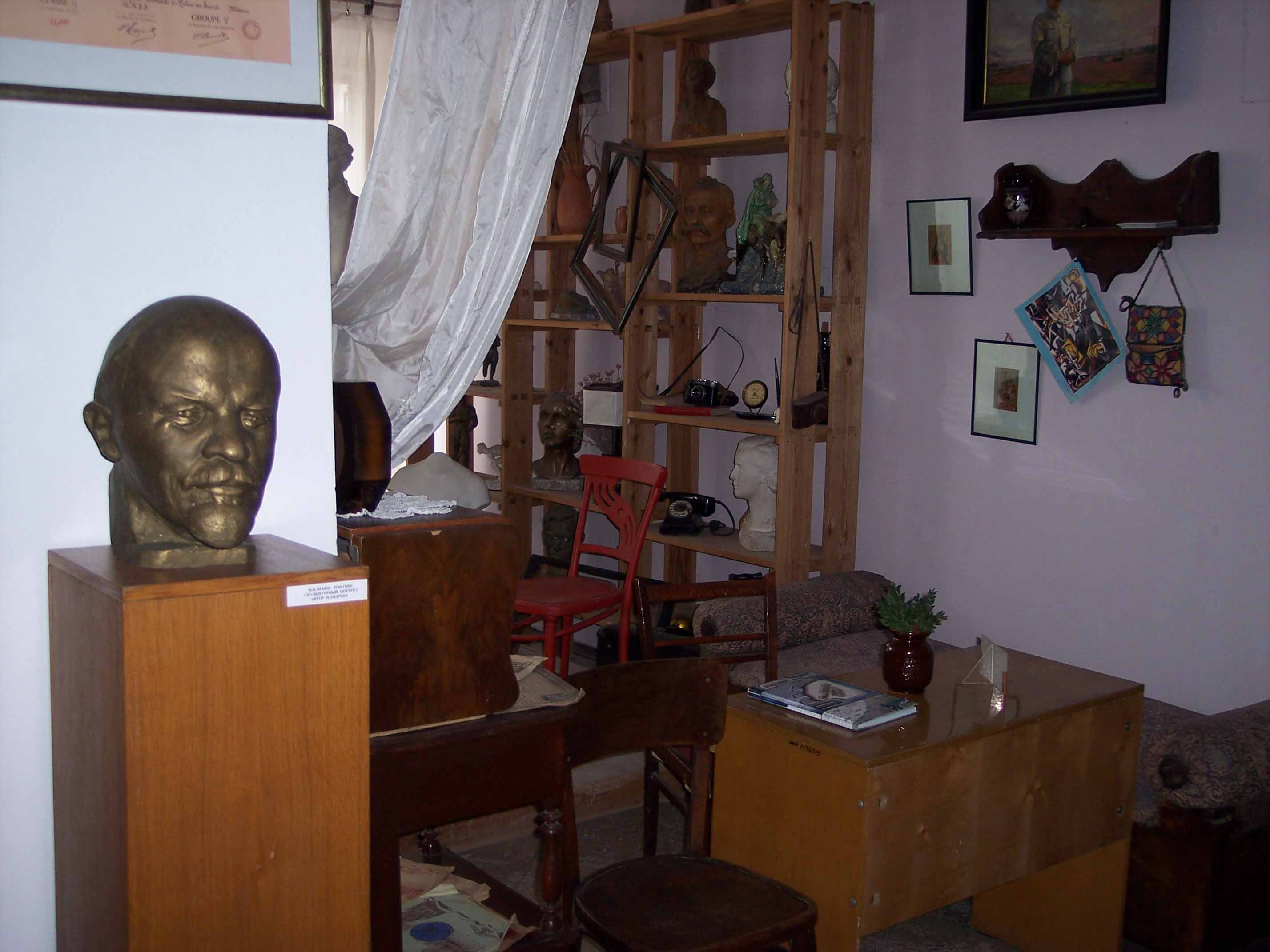
Museum of sculptor V.Мukhina, display 05, Feodosiya, Crimea.

== See also ==
- Vera Mukhina
- Worker and Kolkhoz Woman
