= Mohin =

Mohin is a surname. Notable people with the surname include:

- Lilian Mohin (1938–2020), radical feminist, activist, poet, pioneer of feminist publishing,
- Lucienne Mathieu-Mohin (born 1931), Belgian MP and senator .

== See also ==
- Mohini
- Mukhin
