= Mikhin =

Mikhin (feminine: Mikhina) is a Russian surname. Notable people with the surname include:

- Boris Mikhin (1881-1963), Russian and Soviet film director, screenwriter, artist, film producer
- Elina Mikhina, Kazakhstani athlete sprinter
- Mikhail Mikhin, Soviet pilot

== See also ==
- Mehin (disambiguation)
- Mukhin
