= Muhhin =

Muhhin or Muhhina is a surname, the Estonian spelling of the Russian surname Мухин, Мухина, Mukhin, Mukhina. Notable people with the surname include:

- Jelena Muhhina (born 1988), Estonian figure skater
- Sergei Muhhin (born 1990), Estonian figure skater, brother of Jelena
