= Mukhin =

Mukhin (Russian: Мухин also transliterated as Muchin or Moukhin) is a Russian-language surname derived from the Russian word муха meaning 'fly'. The Feminine form is Mukhina/Muchina (Russian: Мухина.)

- Aleksandr Mukhin (born 2002), Russian football player
- Alexandr Mukhin (born 1998), Kazakhstani biathlete
- Andriy Mukhin (born 1971), Ukrainian luger
- Anton Mukhin (born 2005), Russian football player
- Elena Mukhina (1960–2006), Soviet gymnast
- Igor Mukhin (born 1961), Russian photographer
- Lena Mukhina (1924–1991), Soviet writer
- Lev Mukhin (1936–1977), Soviet heavyweight boxer
- Maksim Mukhin (born 2001), Russian football player
- Mikhail Mukhin (1948–1977), Soviet chess player
- Nikolay Mukhin (born 1955), Russian iconographer and sculptor
- Rinat Mukhin (born 1994), Kazakhstani cross-country skier
- Sergei Mukhin (born 1959), Russian mathematician
- Sergey Mukhin (born 1950), Soviet equestrian
- Vera Mukhina (1889–1953), Soviet sculptor and painter
- Yefrem Mukhin (1766–1850), Russian physician
- Yury Mukhin (activist) (born 1949), Russian activist and writer
- Yury Mukhin (swimmer) (born 1971), Russian freestyle swimmer

== See also ==
- Mikhin
- Muhhin
- Muhin, a Bangladeshi singer
- Mushkin
