= Vera Mukhina =

Soviet sculptor (1889–1953)

- Вера Мухина
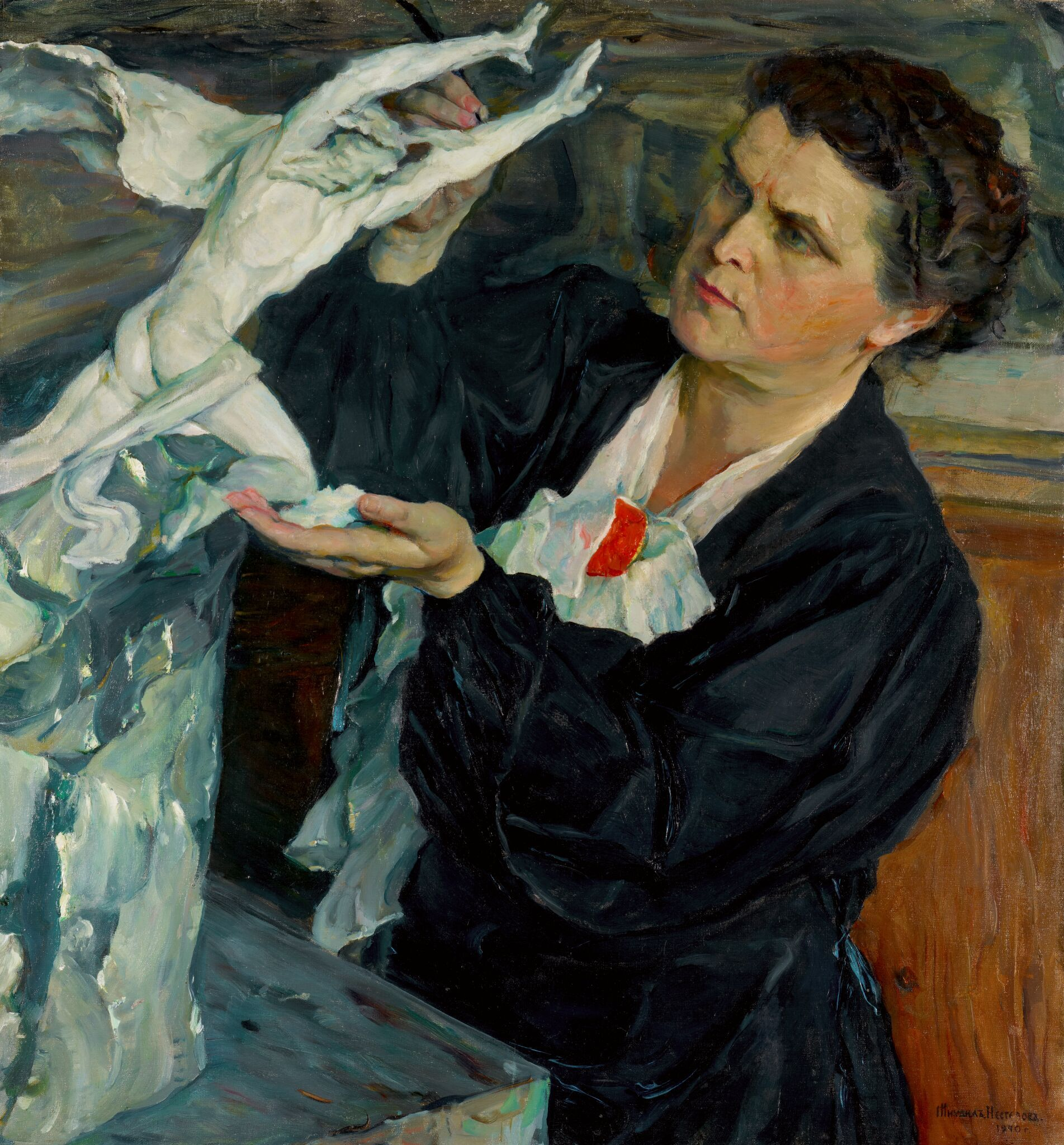
- Portrait by Mikhail Nesterov, 1940, oils; Tretyakov Gallery
- Born: Vera Ignatyevna Mukhina; 1 July 1889; Riga, Governorate of Livonia, Russian Empire
- Died: 6 October 1953 (aged 64); Moscow, Soviet Union
- Resting place: Novodevichy Cemetery, Moscow
- Known for: Sculpture
- Notable work: Worker and Kolkhoz Woman, 1936
- Spouse: Alexey Zamkov (m. 1918; died 1942)
- Awards: Stalin Prize first degree (1941, 1946, 1952), Stalin Prize second degree (1943, 1951)

Vera Ignatyevna Mukhina (Russian: Ве́ра Игна́тьевна Му́хина; French: Vera Moukhina; 1 July [O.S. 19 June] 1889 – 6 October 1953) was a Soviet sculptor and painter. She was nicknamed "the queen of Soviet sculpture". She was one of the members of the art association ‘The Four Arts’, which existed in Moscow and Leningrad from 1924 to 1931.

== Biography ==
Mukhina was born 1889 in Riga, Russian Empire into a wealthy merchant family, and lived at 23/25 Turgeneva Street, where a memorial plaque has now been placed. Mukhina's ancestors lived in Riga after the Patriotic War of 1812. The family was well-to-do: in 1937 Mukhina inherited 4 million lats from her grandfather. She spent her childhood and youth (1892–1904) in Feodosia where her father took her considering his daughter's health (Vera was two years old when her mother died of tuberculosis). In Feodosia the future artist received her first drawing and painting lessons. She lived there until 1904 when her father died. Mukhina and her older sister Maria were sheltered by uncles and aunts who lived in Kursk, where Mukhina went to high school which she graduated from with honors.

On Christmas day of 1912 when Mukhina was staying at her uncle's place in the Smolensk province, she had an accident. While sledding down a hill, she crashed into a tree and her nose was severed by a twig. She had a surgery in hospital in Smolensk but the scars remained on her face for good. Moreover, her girlish delicate face looked very different after eight subsequent plastic surgeries carried out by French surgeons. It acquired a masculine look with rough and strong-willed features. This accident had a tremendous effect on Mukhina’s life and her future career.

She later moved to Moscow, where she studied at several private art schools, including those of Konstantin Yuon and Ilya Mashkov. In 1912 she traveled to Paris, where she attended the Académie de la Grande Chaumière, the Académie de La Palette under Henri Le Fauconnier and Jean Metzinger, and took lessons from Antoine Bourdelle at the same time. She subsequently continued on to Italy to explore the painting and sculpture of the Renaissance period. Mukhina returned to Moscow in summer 1914 two weeks before World War I began. Having taken nursing courses, she began working in a military hospital. Here, also in 1914, she met the young military doctor Aleksey Zamkov, whom she married in 1918.

In 1915 and 1916, she served as assistant to Aleksandra Ekster at Alexander Tairov's Chamber Theater in Moscow. After the October Revolution in Russia the so-called "Lenin plan of monumental propaganda" was adopted. Sculptors received state orders to make city monuments. Mukhina in 1918 completed the project of the monument dedicated to the educator and publicist Nikolay Novikov. The project was approved by Narkompros, but the model of the monument made of clay and stored in an unheated workshop got cracked, and the project remained unfulfilled. Within the framework of monumental propaganda Mukhina created sketches of the sculptures Liberated labor and Revolution (1919) as well as monuments to Vladimir Mikhailovich Zakorskiy (1921) and Yakov Sverdlov (also known as The Flame of the Revolution, 1923).

In the 1920s Mukhina rose to become one of the Soviet Union's most prominent sculptors, and although she continued to produce Cubist sculpture as late as 1922, she became a leading figure of Socialist realism, both in style and ideology. In 1923 Mukhina together with Aleksandra Ekster designed the pavilion of the newspaper Izvestia at the first all-Russia agricultural and handicraft-industrial exhibition in Moscow. In 1925 Mukhina and Nadezhda Lamanova, the fashion designer, received the Grand Prix at the exhibition in Paris for the collection of elegant women's clothing made of cheap coarse materials — cloth, calico, canvas and flannel, hats-from matting, belts decorated with colored peas, and buttons carved from wood. Dresses were decorated with original ornaments, including the "cock pattern" invented by Mukhina.

Mukhina taught at the state school Vkhutemas in 1926–1927, and in 1927–1930 she taught at the higher art and technical institute Vkhutein. In 1927 the sculpture Peasant woman created by Mukhina was awarded the first prize at the exhibition dedicated to the 10th anniversary of the October Revolution. Later the sculpture was purchased by the Museum of Trieste, and after World War II it became the property of the Vatican Museums in Rome.

Mukhina came to the international attention with the 1937 Worker and Kolkhoz Woman. In 1938–1939 she worked on the sculptures for the Moskvoretsky Bridge, Hymn to the International, Flame of the Revolution, Sea, Land, Fertility, and Bread. Bread (1939) is the only composition made by Mukhina; the rest were recreated from sketches after her death.

From October 1941 to April 1942 she lived and worked in the evacuation center in Kamensk-Uralsky. In 1945 Mukhina was invited to Riga as an expert to make a conclusion on the monument Freedom which was going to be demolished. She came out strongly in defense of the monument although her opinion contradicted that of the party and the monument was preserved. She is the creator of two monuments to Maxim Gorky: one of them was installed in 1943 in Moscow at the Belorussky Rail Terminal, the other was installed in 1952 in the city of Gorky.

Another famous work of Mukhina is the monument to Tchaikovsky. It was installed in 1954 in the courtyard of the Moscow Conservatory on Bolshaya Nikitskaya Street. This sculptural composition is located in front of the main facade of the Conservatory and is the dominant feature of the entire architectural complex.

Mukhina's work on official monuments and architectural sculpture on state commissions continued through to her death. She also experimented with glass, producing glass figural busts. Seeking to enrich the artistic vocabulary of Soviet art. She often presented her theories on sculpture, experimented with new materials, and developed a technique of polychromatic sculpture. She decorated exhibitions, made industrial drawings, and designed clothes, textiles, porcelain and theatrical costumes for the Vakhtangov Theater in Moscow.

From 1941 to 1952, Mukhina won the Stalin Prize five times, and she was named People's Artist of the USSR in 1943. Because of Mukhina's influence as a great Soviet artist, and as a former student of the Latvian sculptor Kārlis Zāle, she persuaded Soviet officials in the late 1940s that the Freedom Monument in Riga was of great artistic importance. Due to her efforts, the monument was not demolished to make way for a statue of Joseph Stalin.

In 1953 she wrote the book A Sculptor's Thoughts.

== Death and legacy ==
Mukhina died in Moscow on 6 October 1953 of angina. She is buried in Novodevichy Cemetery, Moscow.

The Museum of Vera Mukhina dedicated to the sculptor's adolescence and work was established in Feodosiya, Ukrainian SSR in 1985.

There is a Vera Mukhina Street in the town Klin, Moscow Oblast.

In 2007, Mukhina's house and studio at 3a Prechistensky Lane in Moscow were slated for demolition.

The crater on Venus is named in honor of Mukhina.

== Work ==
=== In Moscow ===
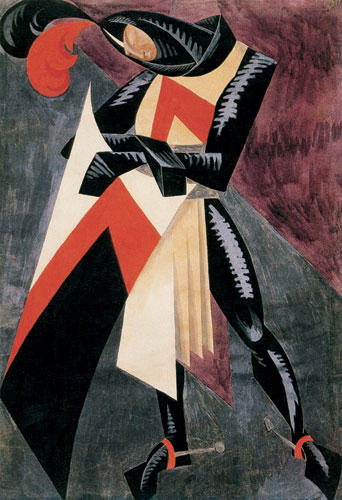
Theatrical costume design (1916)

- Worker and Kolkhoz Woman

Mukhina's most celebrated work by far is the giant monument Worker and Kolkhoz Woman, which was the centerpiece of the Soviet pavilion at the 1937 International Exhibition in Paris. Mukhina's monument crowned the Soviet pavilion designed by the architect Boris Mikhailovich Iofan. According to her plan, the sun frontally illuminated the monument, creating an effect of radiance. Both figures, for all their massiveness, seemed to fly. The feeling of flight was enhanced by a long fluttering scarf introduced by Mukhina into the composition. As a result, the sculpture group was distinguished by an unusual expression and energy, symbolizing the Soviet Union aspiring to new victories. The monument was called by the French press "the greatest work of sculpture of the 20th century", and Pablo Picasso wrote: "How beautiful the Soviet giants are against the lilac Parisian sky". It was the world's first welded sculpture. The 24-meter-tall, 75-ton monument was made of stainless steel plates on a wooden frame, the plates connected by an innovative method of spot welding. One hand of each figure holds respectively a hammer and a sickle, the two implements joining to form the hammer and sickle symbol of the Soviet Union.

After the exhibition closed the monument was disassembled and taken back to Moscow. In 1939 it was installed near the north entrance of the all-Russia exhibition of national economy achievements VDNKH. However, Mukhina’s concept was altered: the monument was placed on a low pedestal and with its back to the sun and the feeling of flying was gone. Mukhina commented on it saying that "the monument creeps on the ground". Nevertheless, in 1947 the sculpture became the logo of the Russian Mosfilm studio. It was renovated and re-installed on a higher pedestal in 2009.

- Sculpture Science installed at the MSU building
- Sculptures Bread and Fertility (another name is Harvest) in the Druzhba Park near the Rechnoy Vokzal (Moscow Metro)
- Sculptures Earth and Water (another name is Sea) in Luzhniki Stadium
- Monument to Peter Tchaikovski at the Moscow Conservatory
- Monument to Maxim Gorky at the Belorussky Rail Terminal – Stalin Prize first degree (1952)
- Monument to Maxim Gorky at the Institute of World Literature
- Seven tombstones at Novodevichy Cemetery

=== In other cities ===
- Sculpture Mir in Volgograd
- Sculptural composition Farhad and Shirin for the complex of the Farkhad hydroelectric power station Farkhadskaya GES.
- Monument to Maxim Gorky in Nizhny Novgorod
- Sculpture on the roof of the planetarium in Volgograd Mir, Mukhina's last creation
