= Worker and Kolkhoz Woman =

1937 sculpture by Vera Mukhina

Coordinates: 55°49′42″N 37°38′44″E

- Рабо́чий и колхо́зница (Rabochiy i Kolkhoznitsa)
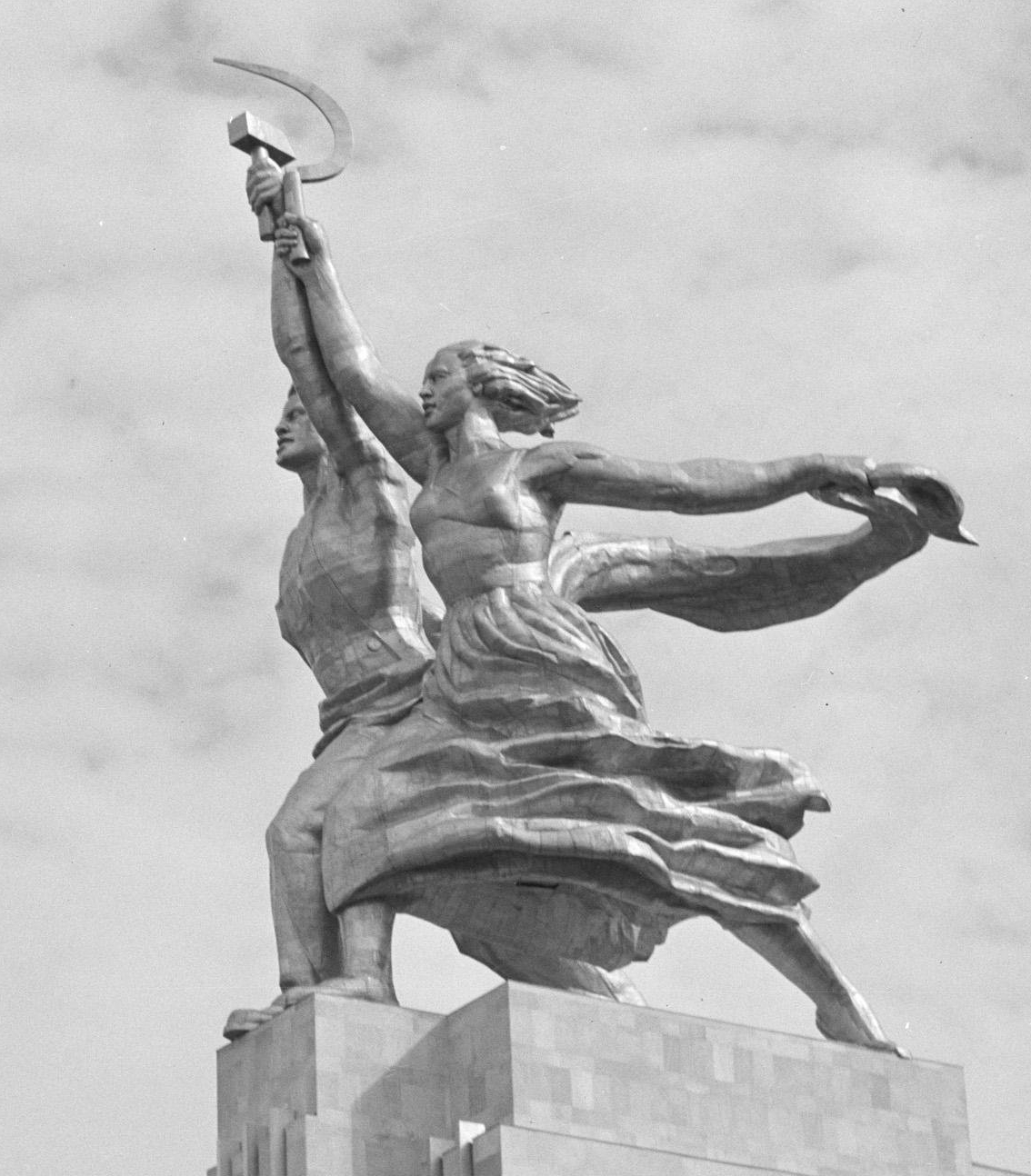
- Artist: Vera Mukhina
- Year: 1937
- Type: Stainless steel
- Dimensions: 24.5 m (80 ft)
- Location: Russian Exhibition Centre, Moscow, Russia

3D model (click to interact)

Worker and Kolkhoz Woman (Russian: Рабочий и колхозница, romanized: Rabochiy i kolkhoznitsa) is a sculpture of two figures with a hammer and a sickle raised over their heads. The concept and compositional design belong to the Soviet architect Boris Iofan. It is 24.5 metres (78 feet) high, made from stainless steel by sculptor Vera Mukhina for the 1937 World's Fair in Paris, and subsequently moved to Moscow. The sculpture is an example of socialist realism in an Art Deco aesthetic. The worker holds aloft a hammer and the kolkhoz woman a sickle to form the hammer and sickle symbol.

== History ==
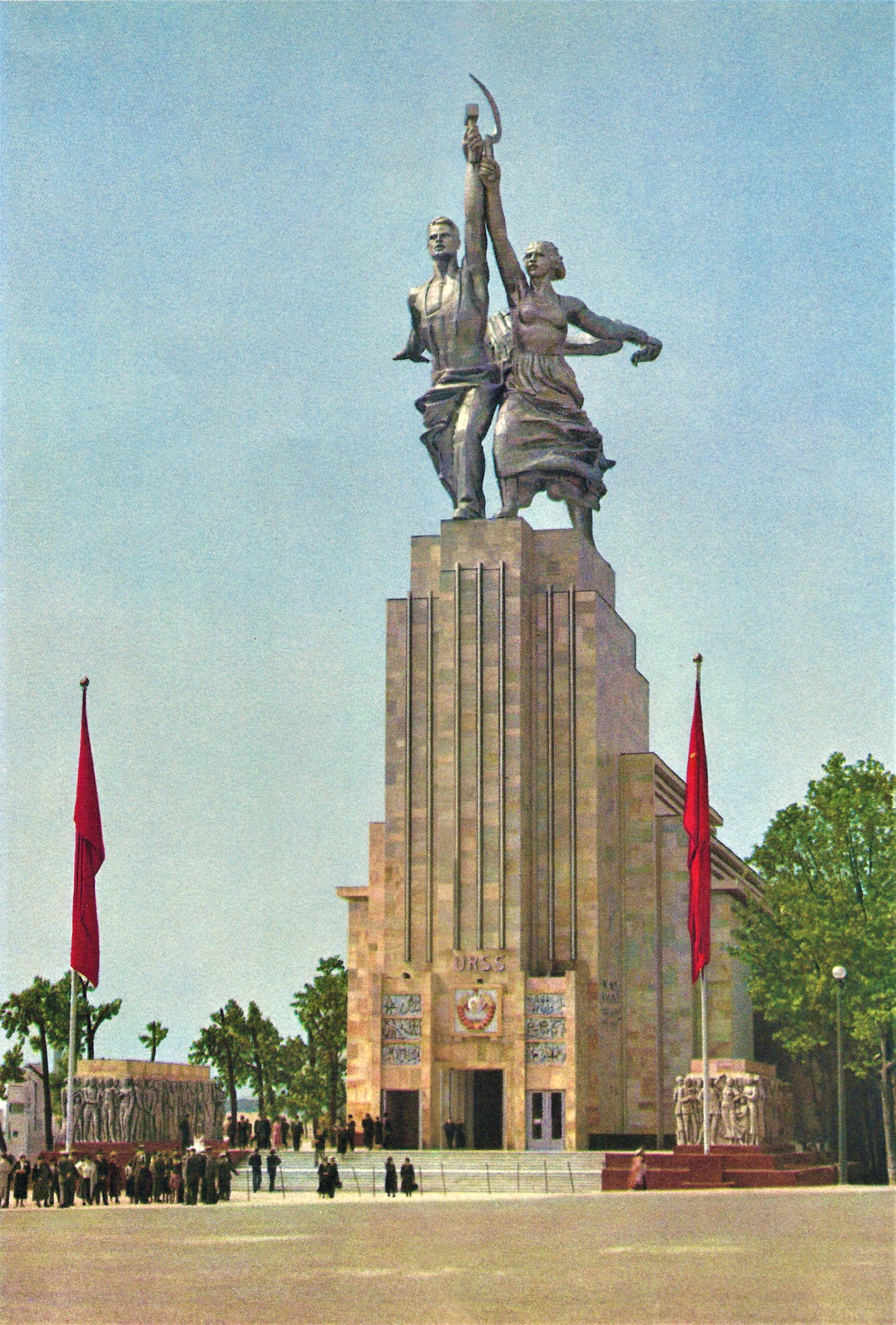
1937 Expo pavilion in Paris

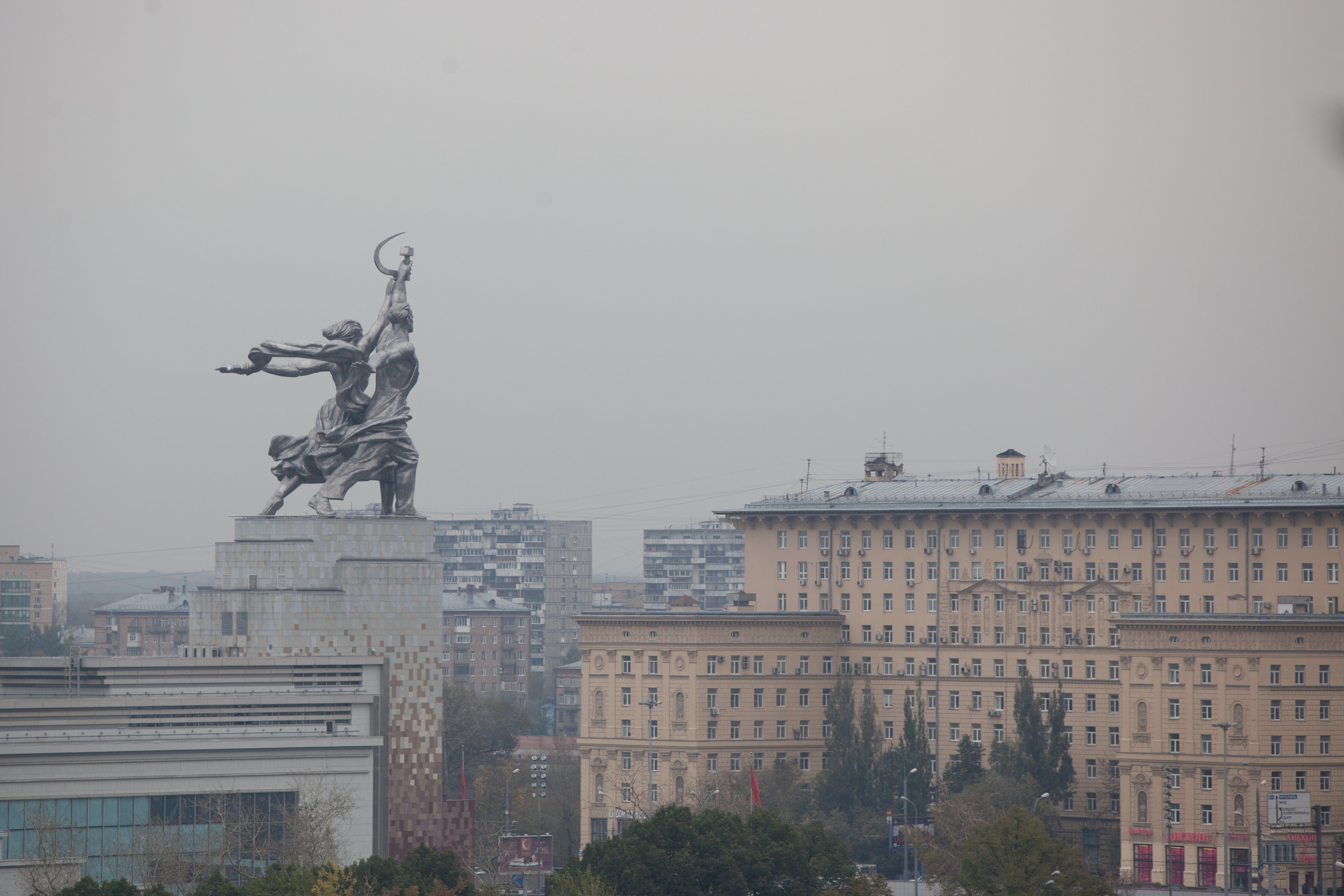
Worker and Kolkhoz Woman from the VDNKh Main Gate

The sculpture was originally created to crown the Soviet pavilion of the 1937 World's Fair. The organisers had placed the Soviet and Nazi German pavilions facing each other across the main pedestrian boulevard at the Trocadéro on the north bank of the Seine.

Mukhina was inspired by her study of the classical Harmodius and Aristogeiton, the Winged Victory of Samothrace and La Marseillaise, François Rude's sculptural group for the Arc de Triomphe, to bring a monumental composition of socialist realist confidence to the heart of Paris. The symbolism of the two figures striding from West to East, as determined by the layout of the pavilion, was also not lost on the spectators.

Mukhina said that her sculpture was intended "to continue the idea inherent in the building, and this sculpture was to be an inseparable part of the whole structure", but after the fair, the Rabochiy i Kolkhoznitsa was relocated to Moscow where it was placed just outside the All-Union Agricultural Exhibition.

In 1941, the sculpture earned Mukhina one of the initial batch of Stalin Prizes.

The sculpture was removed for restoration in autumn of 2003 during the city's Expo 2010 bid. The plan was that the sculpture could be back at its place by 2005, but this did not happen after the city lost the bidding process to Shanghai and many financial problems contributed to a delayed re-installation.

At the end of 2009 the monument returned to its place at VDNKh after 6 years of restorations. The revealing of the restored monument was held on the evening of December 4, 2009, accompanied by fireworks and a light show. The restored statue uses a new pavilion as pedestal, increasing its total height from 34.5 metres (the old pedestal was 10 metres tall) to 60 metres (the new pavilion is 34.5 metres tall plus the 24.5 metres of the statue itself).

== Manufacturing and installation ==
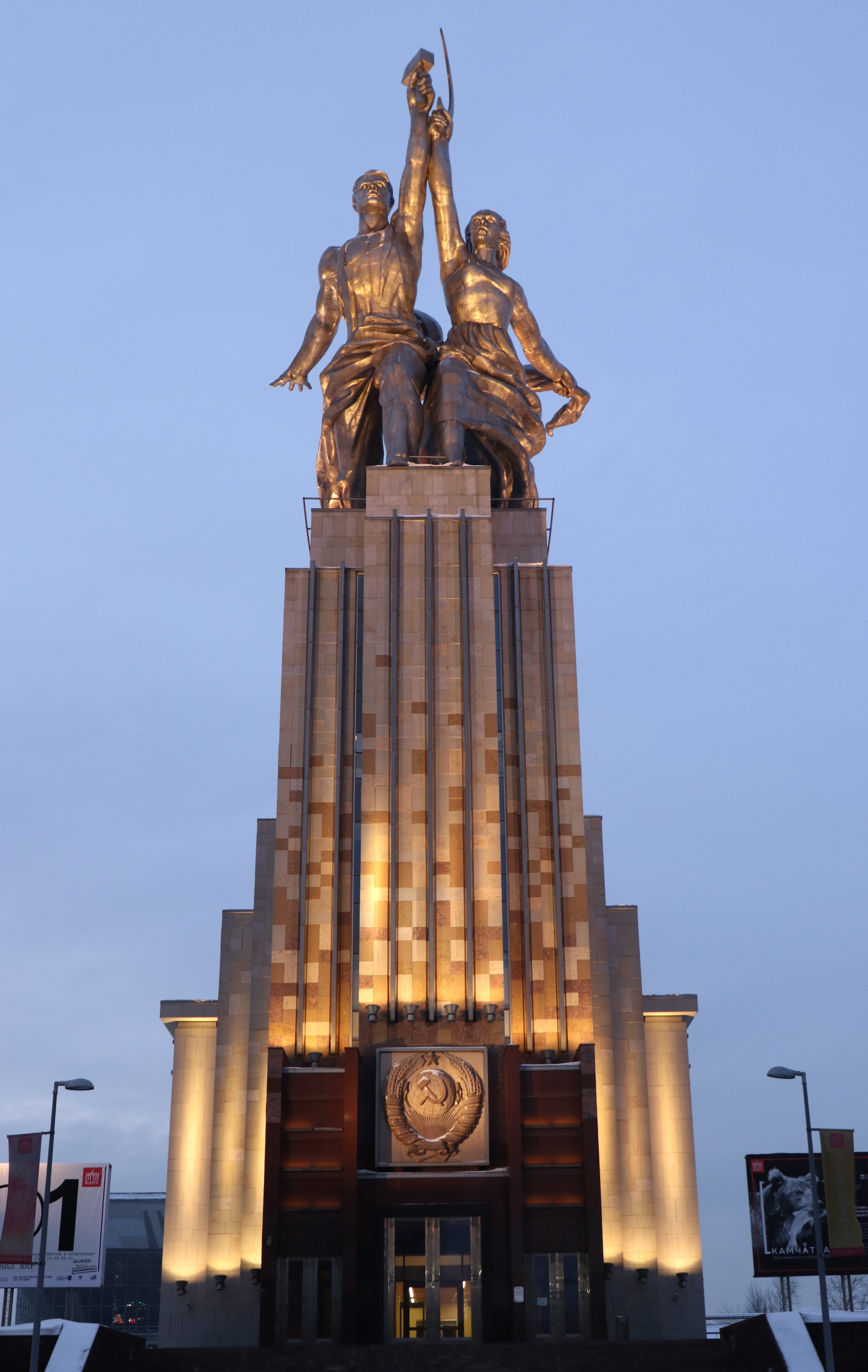
Worker and Kolkhoz Woman in 2022

The main structure of the monument was made at The Moscow factory of aggregate machine tools and automatic lines (called "Stankoagregat"), while the smaller components of the outer covering were created at the pilot plant of the Central Research Institute of Mechanical Engineering and Metalworking, overseen by Professor Pyotr Nikolayevich Lvov. He suggested using stainless chrome-nickel steel for the sculpture, despite initial doubts from Vera Mukhina and the rest of the team. The main reason steel was chosen over bronze and copper was because it had a better ability to reflect light. The goal was for the monument to shine brighter than the eagle on the German pavilion and the Eiffel Tower. Lvov invented resistance spot welding, a technique that was used to skin airplanes since the 1930s. Instead of using the traditional riveting method, the decision was made to use this technology for assembling the sculpture.

At the start of the project, the workers had four plaster models to use, with the tallest one being 95 cm. They assembled the monument in the factory courtyard using a crane that was 35 meters high with a 15-meter boom. The templates for the plating parts were made of wood, and the carpenters used 15 cm thick boards. The molded parts were then shaped from inside the monument. People involved in the project remembered these details:

"Working in February was particularly challenging due to the cold weather and strong winds. The only respite from the wind was inside the frame or "under the skirt of the Kolkhoznitsa". To keep warm, we relied on a fire that was built in a cauldron dug into the ground. Additionally, we had to manually weld the sheathing sheets".

During this time period, the sculpture was created and it was supported by a heavy frame weighing 63 tons. The outer shells of the sculpture, made from thin sheets of 0.5 mm steel, only weighed 12 tons. The entire process took three and a half months. Once the sculpture was assembled, it was visited by a government commission led by Kliment Voroshilov, the People's Commissar of Defense. Later that evening, Joseph Stalin, the leader of the USSR, inspected the finished monument. Shortly after, the sculpture was dismantled for transportation to Paris.

== In culture ==
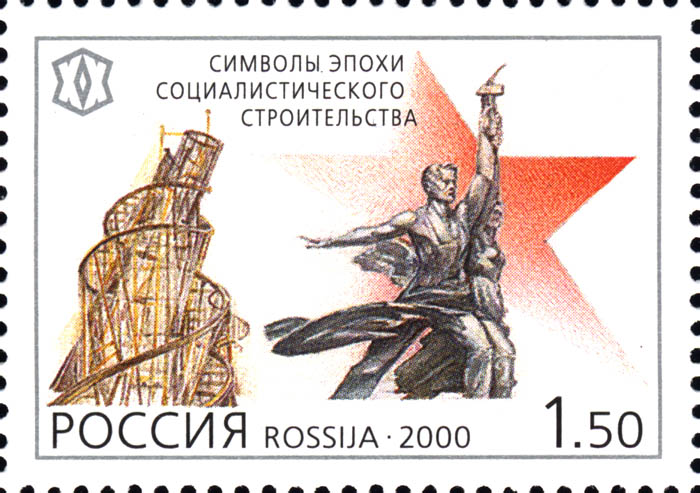
Worker and Kolkhoz Woman was among achievements of the 20th century in the arts to be commemorated in Russian stamps in 2000 (depicted with Tatlin's Tower)

In Soviet cinema, the sculpture was chosen in 1947 to serve as the logo for the film studio Mosfilm. It can be seen in the opening credits of Russian films released by the Mosfilm studio, as well as in the opening credits of the American comedy film Red Heat. Mukhina manufactured a gypsum copy of the sculpture for use in Mosfilm's credits, because photos of the original produced distrorted perspective.

A giant moving reproduction of the statue was featured in the opening ceremony of the 2014 Winter Olympics in Sochi, Russia.

== See also ==
- Socialist realism
- List of tallest statues
- Soviet-era statues

== Sources ==
- Voronov, N.V. (1990). Рабочий и колхозница [Worker and collective farmer] (in Russian). ISBN 5-900829-07-3.
- Shishkina-Yarmolenko, L.; Yarmolenko, A. (2010). К 120-летию В. И. Мухиной. "Рабочий и колхозница": четвёртое рождение [To the 120th anniversary of V.I. Mukhina. "Worker and Collective Farm Woman": fourth birth]. Русский міръ (Russian World) (in Russian) (4). St. Petersburg: Русская культура (Russian culture): 58–67. ISSN 2072-9456.
- Shokarev, Sergey Yurievich (2012). Povsednevnaya zhizn' srednevekovoj Moskvy [Everyday Life in Moscow during the Medieval times] (in Russian). ISBN 978-5-235-03540-9.
