= Mehin, East Azerbaijan =

Mehin مهين
- Village
- Location within Iran
- Coordinates: 37°49′06″N 47°33′58″E
- Country: Iran
- Province: East Azerbaijan
- County: Sarab
- Bakhsh: Central
- Rural District: Howmeh

Population (2006)
  - Total: 413
- Time zone: UTC+3:30 (IRST)
  - Summer (DST): UTC+4:30 (IRDT)

Mehin (Persian: مهين, also Romanized as Mehīn) is a village in Howmeh Rural District, in the Central District of Sarab County, East Azerbaijan Province, Iran. At the 2006 census, its population was 413, in 105 families.
