= Nadezhda Lamanova =

Russian fashion designer

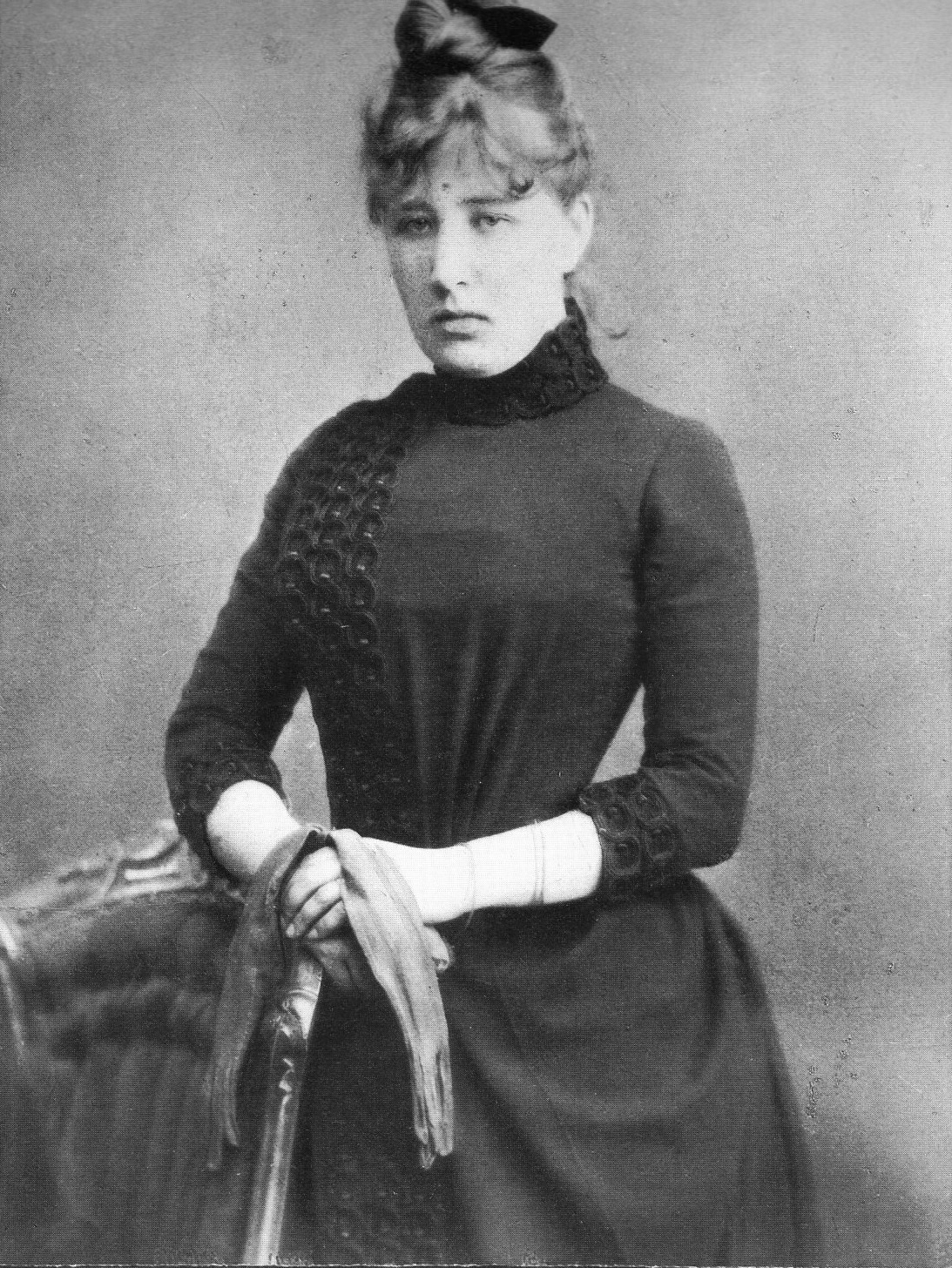
- Lamanova photographed by Andrei Karelin, 1880s
- Born: Nadezhda Petrovna Lamanova; 27 December 1861; Shutilovo, Russian Empire
- Died: 14 October 1941 (aged 79); Moscow, Soviet Union
- Resting place: Vagankovo Cemetery; 55.769622°N 37.552720°E
- Citizenship: Russia, Soviet Union
- Occupations: Fashion designer, Costume designer
- Title: Supplier of Her Majesty's Imperial Court
- Parents: Petr Mikhailovich Lamanov; Nadezhda Aleksandrovna Lamanova (Lisheva)
- Relatives: Anna Petrovna (sister); Ekaterina Petrovna (sister); Maria Petrovna Lamanova (sister); Sofia Petrovna Kraht (Lamanova) (sister); Roman Konstantinovich Kraht (nephew); Vladimir Konstantinovich Kraht (nephew); Nadezhda Konstantinovna Kraht (niece); Andrey Pavlovich Kayutov (husband)
- Awards: Grand-Prix at Paris International Exposition of 1925
- Website: http://nlamanova.ru

Signature
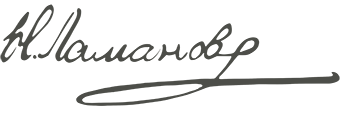

Nadezhda Petrovna Lamanova (Russian: Надежда Петровна Ламанова; 27 December [O.S. 14 December] 1861 - 14 October 1941) was a Russian and Soviet fashion and costume designer.

== Career ==
Until the Russian Revolution, Lamanova held a title of supplier of Her Majesty's Imperial Court. Lamanova created gowns for the Empress Alexandra Feodorovna. After the Revolution, Lamanova was the only renowned designer to stay in Russia and lay the basis for the new Soviet fashion. In cooperation with Russian artist and sculptor Vera Mukhina Lamanova won the Grand-prix at the International Exposition of 1925 in Paris.
