= 1892 in Russia =

- Decades: 1870s; 1880s; 1890s; 1900s; 1910s
- See also: History of Russia; Timeline of Russian history; List of years in Russia

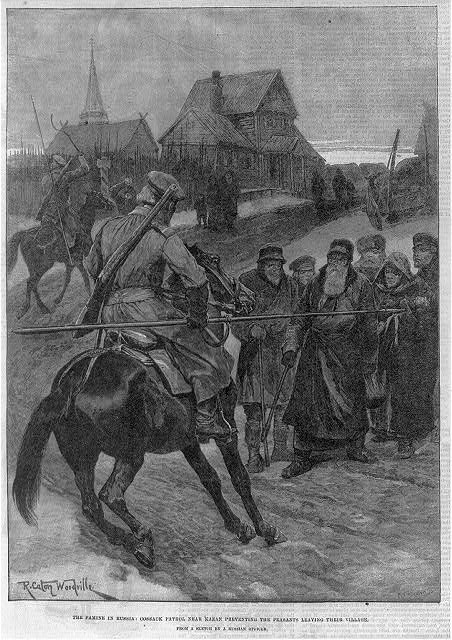
Cossack patrol preventing peasants from leaving their village, 1892

Events from the year 1892 in Russia.

== Incumbents ==
- Monarch – Alexander III

== Events ==
- The discovery of viruses by Dmitri Ivanovsky
- The creation of Mir Bozhiy
- Diamond Trellis Egg
- Franco-Russian Alliance
- Russian famine of 1891–92
- The Conquest of Bread by Peter Kropotkin
- Iolanta by Pyotr Ilyich Tchaikovsky

== Births ==
- January 4 – Pavel Medvedev, literary scholar (d. 1938)
- January 10 – Vladimir Littauer, Russian equestrian trainer (d. 1989)
- January 12 – Mikhail Kirponos, general of the Red Army (d. 1941)
- January 17 – Igor Terentiev, poet, artist, stage director, and a representative of the Russian avant-garde (d. 1937)
- January 24 – Arkady Shvetsov, aircraft engine designer (d. 1953)
- January 24 – Pyotr Solodukhin, military figure and Bolshevik division commander in the Russian Civil War (d. 1920)
- January 25 – Kamilla Trever, historian, numismatist and orientalist (d. 1974)
- January 28 – Fyodor Raskolnikov, politician, writer, journalist, commander of Red fleets and a Soviet diplomat (d. 1939)
- January 28 – Ivan Tyulenev, military commander (d. 1978)
- February 2 – Boris Kuftin, archaeologist and ethnographer (d. 1953)
- February 5 – Fyodor Borisov, cyclist (d. 1964)
- February 6 – Ivan Loiko, flying ace (d. unknown)
- February 7 – Vasily Butusov, football player (d. 1971)
- February 8 – Fyodor Astakhov, Marshal of Aviation (d. 1966)
- February 14 – Maria Vorobyeva-Stebelska, also known as Marie Vorobieff or Marevna, a painter known for her work with Cubism and pointillism (d. 1984)
- February 18 – Alexander Serebrovsky, geneticist, poultry breeder, and eugenicist (d. 1948)
- February 24 – Konstantin Fedin, Russian writer (d. 1977)
- February 25 – Alexander Chervyakov, politician and revolutionary (d. 1937)
- February 26 – Pyotr Baranovsky, architect, preservationist and restorator (d. 1984)
- February 26 – Nikolai Orlov, pianist (d. 1964)
- March 1 – Nikolai Nevsky, linguist (d. 1937)
- March 2 – Georgi Atarbekov, security police official (d. 1925)
- March 4 – Yevgeni Ivanov-Barkov, film director and screenwriter (d. 1965)
- March 4 – Nikolai Kondratiev, economist and proponent of the New Economic Policy (NEP) (d. 1938)
- March 5 – Kasyan Goleizovsky, choreographer and dancer (d. 1970)
- March 8 – Gyulboor Davydova, winegrower (d. 1983)
- March 13 – Yevgeniy Terletskiy, politician, member of the Russian Constituent Assembly, People Commissar (narkom) of Justice, diplomat (d. 1938)
- March 14 – Antonina Sofronova, artist and illustrator (d. 1966)
- March 21 – Aleksandr Malyshkin, writer (d. 1938)
- March 25 – Helena Antipoff, psychologist (d. 1974)
- March 25 – Alexander Poniatoff, electrical engineer (d. 1980)
- March 25 – Konstantin Zel'in, historian of classical antiquity (d. 1983)
- April 2 – Xenia Denikina, writer, Anton Denikin's wife (d. 1973)
- April 6 – Nikita Naidenov, speed skater (d. 1961)
- April 18 – Dmitrii Menshov, mathematician (d. 1988)
- April 19 – Georgy Adamovich, poet of the acmeist school, and a literary critic, translator and memoirist (d. 1972)
- April 22 – Nikolai Obukhov, composer (d. 1964)
- April 24 – Mikhail Skorodumov, general (d. 1963)
- May 9 – Nikolai Khodataev, artist, sculptor and animator, one of the founders of the Soviet animation industry (d. 1979)
- May 14 – Arthur Lourié, composer, writer, administrator, and musical agent (d. 1966)
- May 30 – Konstantin Ostrovityanov, Marxist economist, academic and public figure (d. 1969)
- May 30 – Ivan Sokolov-Mikitov, writer and journalist (d. 1975)
- May 31 – Konstantin Paustovsky, writer nominated for the Nobel Prize in Literature in 1965 (d. 1968)
- June 6 – Alexander Kapitokhin, Lieutenant general (d. 1958)
- June 9 – Nikolai Polikarpov, aeronautical engineer and aircraft designer (d. 1944)
- June 13 – Valeria Barsova, operatic soprano (d. 1967)
- June 21 – Nikolai Gorbunov, politician, chemist, engineer and academic (d. 1970)
- July 8 – Pavel Korin, painter and art restorer (d. 1967)
- July 8 – Aleksandr Porokhovschikov, military engineer, tank and aircraft inventor (d. 1941)
- July 12 – Léon Zack, painter and sculptor (d. 1980)
- July 13 – Mirsaid Sultan-Galiev, Bolshevik revolutionary (d. 1940)
- July 29 – Pyotr Romanovsky, chess player and author (d. 1964)
- August 6 – Sergei Bessonov, state, public and party activist and diplomat (d. 1941)
- August 12 – Boris Lavrentiev, histologist (d. 1944)
- August 13 – Yuri Jobbers (Georgiy Maklakov), teacher and a Catholic convert from Russian Orthodoxy (d. 1969)
- August 15 – Ivan Boldin, a senior Red Army general (d. 1965)
- August 15 – Stepan Oborin, Red Army major general (d. 1941)
- August 19 – Elizabeth Kozlova, ornithologist (d. 1975)
- August 27 – Alexander Chuhaldin, violinist, conductor, composer, and music educator (d. 1951)
- September 19 – Nina Niss-Goldman, painter, sculptor and a teacher (d. 1990)
- September 22 – Pyotr Baranov, a military commander and politician, one of the main creators and organisers of the Air Force and the aircraft industry of the Soviet Union (d. 1933)
- September 30 – Andrey Khrulyov, military commander (d. 1962)
- October 1 – Mikhail Pronin, major general (d. 1978)
- October 5 – Pyotr Suvchinsky, artistic patron and writer on music (d. 1985)
- October 8 – Marina Tsvetaeva, poet of the Silver Age, prose writer, translator (d. 1941)
- October 12 – Yevgeny Korovin, jurist specializing in international law (d. 1964)
- October 20 – Sergei Tomkeieff, geologist and petrologist who won the Geological Society's Lyell Medal (d. 1968)
- October 21 – Lydia Lopokova, ballerina (d. 1981)
- October 21 – Yuri Terapiano, poet, writer, translator, literary critic and a prominent figure in White émigré cultural life (d. 1980)
- October 24 – Jaan Lukas, military personnel (d. 1953)
- October 26 – Andrey Chekharin, Red Army colonel (d. 1941)
- October 31 – Alexander Alekhine, chess player and the fourth World Chess Champion (d. 1946)
- November 10 – Diodor Kolpinskiy, Eastern Catholic priest (d. 1932)
- November 14 – Ernest Drezen, Esperantist and engineer (d. 1937)
- November 17 – Nikandr Chibisov, Soviet Army colonel general (d. 1959)
- November 20 – Mikhail Rusakov, geologist (d. 1963)
- November 23 – Rudolf Sivers, revolutionary and military leader (d. 1918)
- November 24 – Dmitri Skobeltsyn, physicist (d. 1990)
- November 27 – Prince Oleg Konstantinovich of Russia, the son of Grand Duke Constantine Constantinovich (d. 1914)
- November 28 – Tarlan Aliyarbayov, military officer (d. 1956)
- December 2 – Boris Shimeliovich, revolutionary and the medical director of Moscow's Botkin Hospital (d. 1952)
- December 5 – Mykola Barsamov, architect, preservationist and restorator (d. 1976)
- December 9 – Vsevolod Balitsky, a Soviet official, Commissar of State Security 1st Class of the NKVD (d. 1937)
- December 16 – Boris Gusman, author, screenplay writer, theater director, and columnist for Pravda (d. 1944)
- December 18 – Mykola Kulish, prose writer, playwright, pedagogue, veteran of World War I (d. 1937)
- December 18 – Michael Visaroff, actor (d. 1951)
- December 23 – Sarra Lebedeva, sculptor (d. 1967)
- December 26 – Konstantin Tretiakoff, neuropathologist (d. 1958)
- December 29 – Aleksandr Arkhangelsky, aircraft designer (d. 1978)

== Deaths ==
- January 8 – Nikolay Ilminsky, professor of Turkic languages (b. 1822)
- January 11 – Sofya Bogomolets, a revolutionary and political prisoner (b. 1856)
- January 16 – Mikhail Semevsky, historian (b. 1837)
- January 25 – Grand Duke Konstantin Nikolayevich of Russia, the second son of Nicholas I and Charlotte of Prussia, the Emperor's Viceroy of Poland and a general admiral of the Imperial Russian Navy (b. 1825)
- February 13 – Wilhelm Junker, Doctor of Medicine, geographer and traveller, one of the first Russian explorers of Africa (b. 1840)
- February 29 – Evgraf Sorokin, artist and teacher (b. 1821)
- March 3 – Andrey Denyer, portrait photographer and artist (b. 1820)
- March 15 – Fedor Solntsev, painter, art restorer, architect, and historian (b. 1801)
- March 15 – Mikhail Znamensky, a Russian writer, memoirist, painter, caricaturist, archeologist and ethnographer (b. 1833)
- April 21 – Ivan Shamshev, an Imperial Russian lieutenant general, adjutant general and division commander (b. 1819)
- May 16 – Ekaterina Beketova, poet, writer, and translator (b. 1855)
- May 24 – Nikolai Karonin-Petropavlovsky, writer, essayist, and political activist (b. 1853)
- June 1 – Pyotr Gruzinsky, painter (b. 1837)
- June 11 – Nikolai Skadovsky, painter (b. 1845)
- June 25 – Jan Czerski, paleontologist, osteologist, geologist, geographer and explorer of Siberia (b. 1845)
- July 25 – Sergei Tretyakov, philanthropist and patron of the arts, who co-founded the Tretyakov Gallery with his brother Pavel Tretyakov (b. 1834)
- August 3 – Johann August Nauck, a German classical scholar and critic (b. 1822)
- September 16 – Judah Leib Gordon, poet (b. 1830)
- November 16 – Alexey Galakhov, author and literary historian (b. 1807)
- November 19 – Viktor Klyushnikov, writer, editor and journalist (b. 1841)
- December 3 – Afanasy Fet, lyric poet and translator, memoirist, Corresponding member of the St. Petersburg Academy of Sciences, prose writer (b. 1820)
- December 26 – Martha von Sabinin, public figure, composer and pianist, founder of the Russian Red Cross (b. 1831)
