= Vsemirnaya Illyustratsiya =

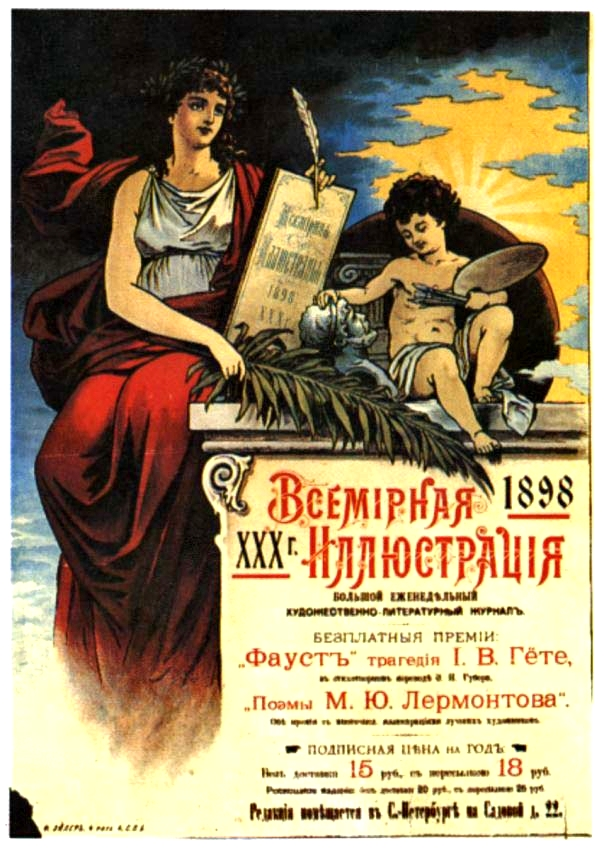
- An 1898 poster
- Editor: German Goppe
- Frequency: Weekly
- Circulation: 11,000 (1878)
- Founded: 1869
- Final issue: 1898
- Country: Russian Empire
- Based in: Saint Petersburg
- Language: Russian

Vsemirnaya Illyustratsiya (Russian: Всемирная иллюстрация, World Illustrated) was a Russian weekly magazine founded by German Goppe and published by his own publishing house in Saint Petersburg in 1869–1898.

== Background and authors ==
A moderately liberal publication, modelling itself on the European journals like The Illustrated London News, Die Gartenlaube and Le Monde Illustre, it soon became the most popular illustrated magazine in Russia of its time, with a circulation up to 11,000 in 1878. Originally the text was auxiliary, mostly functioning as commentary to elaborate, high quality illustrations, but gradually the articles became more developed and in-depth, and the belles-lettres section appeared, on the basis of which in 1889 a separate literary fortnightly was launched, called Trud. Still, literature remained a prominent feature of Vsemirnaya Illyustratsiya, and among the authors who contributed to it regularly, were Anton Chekhov, Vikenty Veresayev, Konstantin Sluchevsky, Vera Zhelikhovskaya, Anatoly Leman, Apollon Korinfsky, Ekaterina Krasnova, Alexey Ivanov-Classic, Yakov Polonsky and Vladimir Nemirovich-Danchenko. The literary section was edited by Dmitry Averkiyev (1869—1871), Konstantin Sluchevsky (1871—1875), Vasily Popov (1875—1885), I.L. Fenner (1885), Anatoly Leman (1885—1887), F.F. Alexandrov (1887—1891) and Pyotr Bykov (1891—1898).

== Featured artists ==
More than fifty Russian artists worked for the journal, including Ivan Ayvazovsky, Alexey Bogolyubov, Apollinary Vasnetsov, Vasily Surikov, Ivan Shishkin, Lev Lagorio, Nikolai Karazin, Gustav Broling, Alexander Beggrov, Nikolai Rerikh, Alexey Afanasyev, Pyotr Borel, Abram Arkhipov, as well as the two prominent Russian photographers, Alfred Fedetsky and Karl Fischer. Its chess section, the largest in Russian press, was edited by Ilya Shumov and later Mikhail Chigorin. The critic and opera singer Mikhail Sariotti was responsible for its music section in the 1870s.

== Special supplements ==
Several outstanding events and anniversaries warranted the publication of special supplements: "The Album for the 200th Jubilee of Peter the Great" (the text provided by Pyotr Petrov and Sergey Shubinsky, 1872), "The Album of Russian Fairytales and Bylinas" (Pyotr Petrov, 1875), "The Illustrated Chronicles of the War" (1877—1878), "The All-Russian Exhibition of Arts and Industry in Moscow" (1882) and "Imperial Weddings from Mikhail Fyodorovich to Alexander II" (1883).
