= Hermann Hoppe =

Russian publisher (1836–1885)

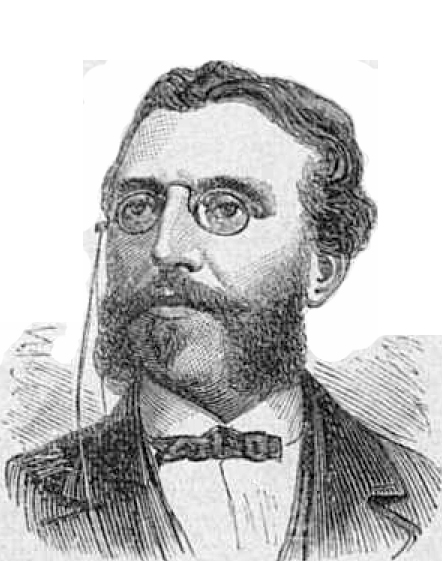
- Born: German Dmitrievich Goppe; May 6, 1836; Hamm, Westfalia, Prussia
- Died: April 27, 1885 (aged 48); Saint Petersburg, Russia
- Occupation: Publisher

Hermann Hoppe (Russian: Герман Дмитриевич Гоппе, romanized: German Dmitriyevich Goppe; 6 May 1836 – 27 April 1885) was a Russian publisher, the founder of the Hermann Hoppe Publishing House (Russian: Книгоиздательство Германъ Гоппе), which was based in Saint Petersburg from 1867 to 1914. He is best remembered as a founder and publisher of Vsemirnaya Illyustratsiya (1869–1898), the first Russian illustrated weekly for family reading.

His other projects included the journal Graphic Art Review (Обзор графических искусств), the Common Saint Petersburg Address Book (1867–1868), the highly popular Common Calendar (Всеобщий календарь, 1867–1900), a book of general recommendations called Good Manners (Хороший тон, 1881), as well as Fashion and News (Моды и новости, 1867–1868), later to be known as Modny Svet (Fashionable Society, 1867–1883), the extravagantly illustrated fashion magazine for ladies which Anton Chekhov was well acquainted with and often mentioned in his early stories.

It was Hoppe who in 1879 founded the now well-known Ogonyok (Огонёк). Several of Hoppe's Anniversary albums, like "Peter the Great. The 200th Anniversary Album" or "The Album of Russian Fairytales and Bylinas" (1875) (the text provided by Pyotr Petrov, for both) became priced rarities.

His Katalog der wichtigeren, hervorragenden und besseren Schriften deutscher Literatur, welche in den Jahren 1801 bis Ende 1868 erschienen sind written in German, has been described as 'unique'. Hoppe was one of the founders of the Russian Society of Booksellers and Publishers (Русское Общество книгопродавцев и издателей) which published Knizhny Vestnik (Books' Herald) in 1884–1916.

== Sources ==
- "Гоппе, Герман Дмитриевич" . Brockhaus and Efron Encyclopedic Dictionary (in Russian). 1906.
