= Dvorovoy =

Slavic spirit

The Dvorovoy (Russian: Дворовой) is a Slavic spirit of the courtyard. It was associated with a farmstead's grounds, cattle shed, and stable. The dvorovoy is similar to the house spirit domovoi, though it is less benevolent. A dvorovoy is considered more dangerous than a domovoi as it could pose a threat to livestock, particularly animals with white fur.

== Bibliography ==
- Apollon Korinfsky Михайлов день // Народная Русь : Круглый год сказаний, поверий, обычаев и пословиц русского народа. — М.: Издание книгопродавца М. В. Клюкина, 1901. — С. 468–474. (in Russian)
- Sergey Maximov Домовой-дворовой // Нечистая, неведомая и крестная сила. — СПб.: Товарищество Р. Голике и А. Вильворг, 1903. — С. 44–48. (in Russian)
- Plotnikova, A. (1995). N. I. Tolstoy (ed.). Slavyanskie drevnosti. Etnolingvisticheskiy slovar Славянские древности: Этнолингвистический словарь [Slavic antiquity. Ethnolinguistic dictionary] (in Russian). Vol. 1. The Russian Academy of Sciences. Moscow: Mezhdunarodnye Otnosheniya. pp. 215–217. ISBN 5-7133-0704-2.
