= Valentin Serov =

Russian painter (1865–1911)

- Валентин Серов
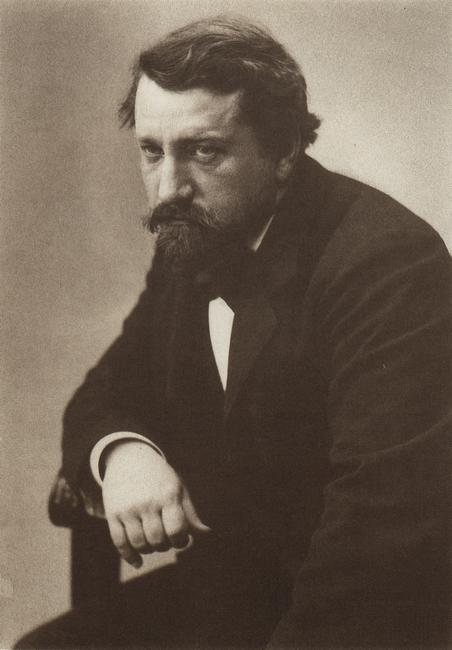
- Serov during the 1900s, photographed by Karl Fischer
- Born: 19 January 1865; Saint Petersburg, Russian Empire
- Died: 5 December 1911 (aged 46); Moscow, Russia
- Resting place: Novodevichy Cemetery, Moscow
- Education: Ilya Repin; Pavel Chistyakov
- Known for: Portrait painting
- Notable work: Girl with Peaches, 1887
- Movement: Peredvizhniki, Impressionism, Mir iskusstva
- Elected: Member Academy of Arts (1898); Full Member Academy of Arts (1903)

Valentin Alexandrovich Serov (Russian: Валентин Александрович Серов; 19 January [O.S. 7 January] 1865 – 5 December 1911) was a Russian painter and draughtsman during the Belle Époque, active in St. Petersburg and Moscow, best remembered for his portraits.

== Life and work ==
=== Youth and education ===
Serov was born in Saint Petersburg, the sole son of the Russian composer and music critic Alexander Serov and his wife and former student Valentina Serova, also a composer in her own right. Raised in a highly artistic milieu he was encouraged to pursue his talents by his parents and in his childhood he studied in Paris and Moscow under Ilya Repin and in the St. Petersburg Academy of Arts (1880–1885) under Pavel Chistyakov. Serov's early creativity was sparked by the realistic art of Repin and strict pedagogical system of Chistyakov. Further influences on Serov were the old master paintings he viewed in the museums of Russia and Western Europe, friendships with Mikhail Vrubel and (later) Konstantin Korovin, and the creative atmosphere of the Abramtsevo Colony, to which he was closely connected.

=== Early works ===
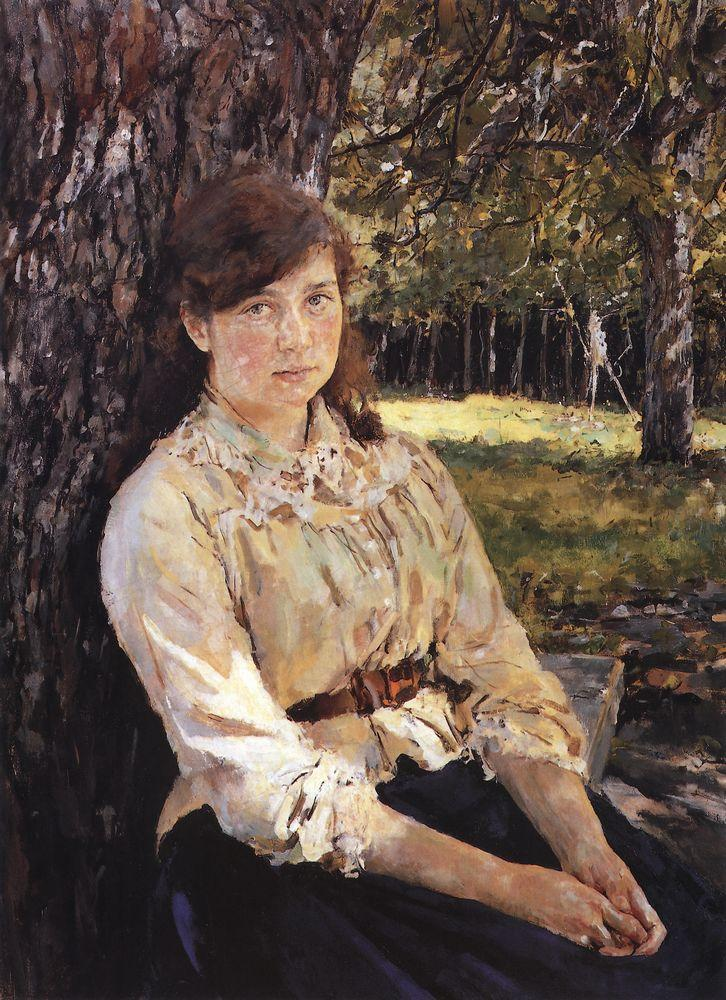
The Girl Covered by the Sun, 1888

The greatest works of Serov's early period were portraits: The Girl with Peaches (1887), and The Girl Covered by the Sun (1888), both in the Tretyakov Gallery. In these paintings Serov concentrated on spontaneity of perception of the model and nature. In the development of light and color, the complex harmony of reflections, the sense of atmospheric saturation, and the fresh picturesque perception of the world, there appeared the features of early Russian impressionism (though Serov was not yet aware of works of French impressionists at the time of making those paintings).

=== Portraiture and success ===
From 1890 on, the portrait became the basic genre in Serov's art. It was in this field that his early style would become apparent, the paintings notable for the psychologically pointed characteristics of his subjects. Serov's favorite models were actors, artists, and writers, such as Konstantin Korovin (1891), Isaac Levitan (1893), Nikolai Leskov (1894), and Nikolai Rimsky-Korsakov (1898)—all in the Tretyakov Gallery.

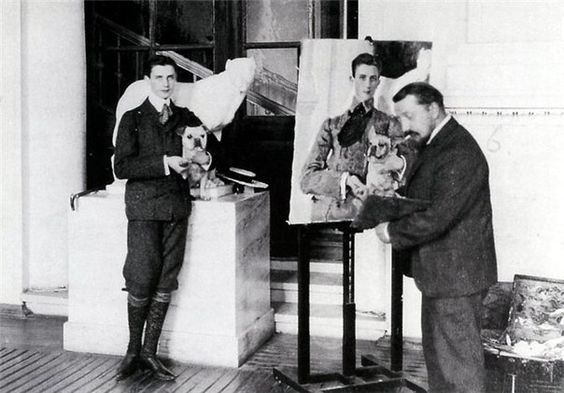
Serov painting Felix Yusupov, 1903

Initially abstaining from the polychromatic, brightly colored painting style of the 1880s, Serov often preferred a dominant scale of black-grey or brown tones. Impressionistic features appeared sometimes in composite construction of a portrait, or to capture a sense of spontaneous movement. As in the work of his contemporaries John Singer Sargent and Anders Zorn, the impressionism is not doctrinaire, but derives as much from the study of Hals and Velázquez as from modern theory. Receiving wide popularity, in 1894 Serov joined with the Peredvizhniki (The Itinerants), and took on important commissions, among them portraits of grand duke Pavel Alexandrovich, (1897, Tretyakov Gallery), S.M. Botkin, 1899, and Felix Yusupov, 1903 as well as Princess Olga Orlova (these in the Russian Museum in St. Petersburg). In these truthful, compositionally skillful, and picturesque executions in the grand manner, Serov consistently used linear-rhythmic drawing coupled with decorative color combinations.

At the same time, he developed a contrasting direction: he frequently produced intimate, heartfelt, chamber portraits, mainly of children and women. In portraits of children Serov aspired to capture pose and gesture, to reveal and emphasize a spontaneity of internal movement, sincere cleanliness and clearness of attitude of the child (Children, 1899, Russian Museum; Mika Morozov, 1901, Tretyakov Gallery). Serov frequently called upon various graphic techniques—watercolors, pastels, lithographs and so forth. Figures in Serov's portraits gradually became more and more graphically refined and economical, particularly during the late period (Vasily Kachalov, 1908, Tamara Karsavina, 1909; numerous figures from Ivan Krylov's fables, 1895–1911). From 1890 to 1900 Serov produced many landscape compositions on country themes, in which the artistic direction took a romantic turn.

=== Marriage and family ===
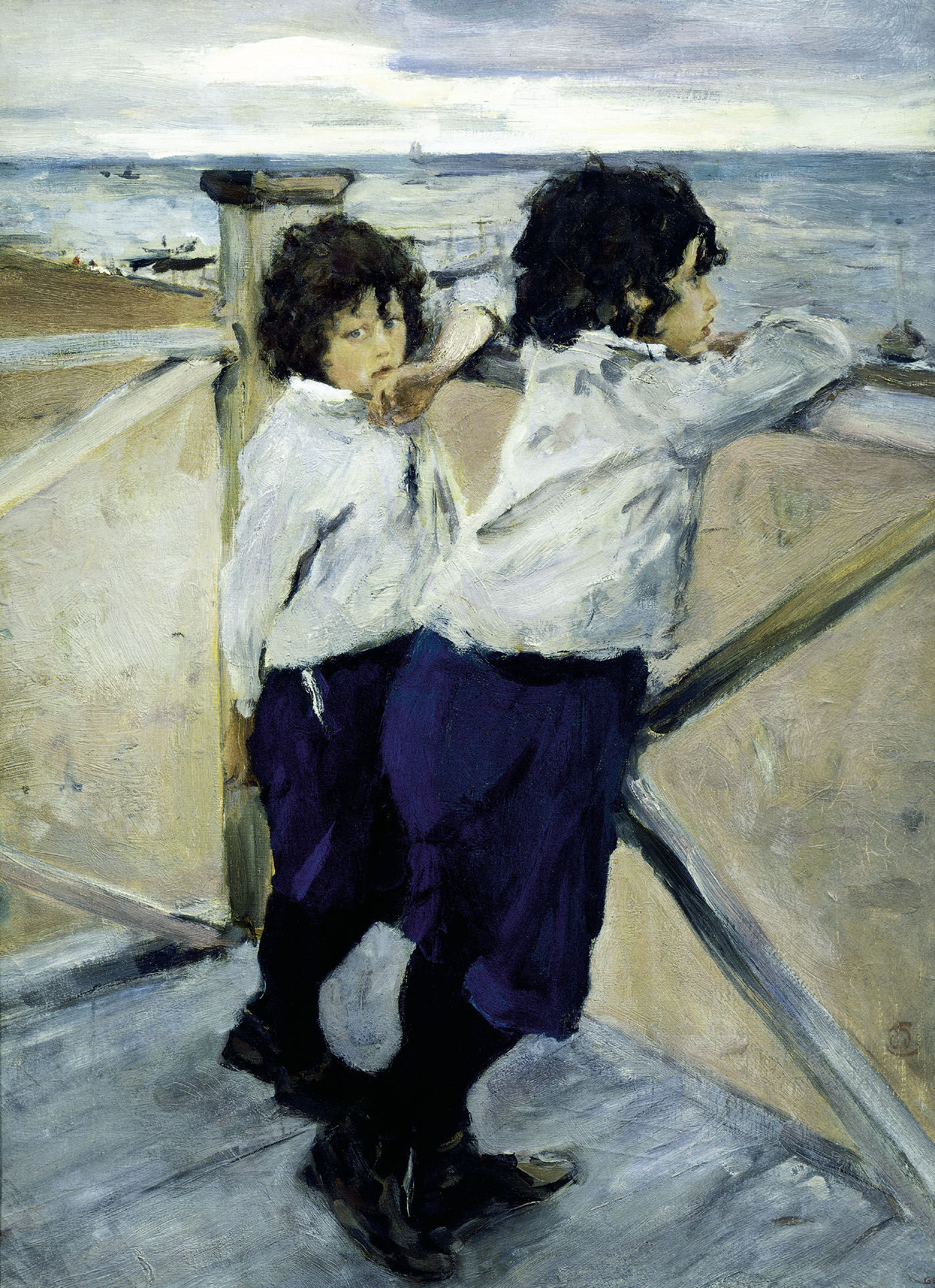
Children (1899)

Serov married Olga Trubnikova (1865—1927) in 1889. His wife and his children were the subject of many of his works. Notably, his painting Children was of his sons Yura and Sasha. His children were Olga (1890-1946), Alexander (Sasha) (1892-1959, Beirut), George (Yura) (1894-1929, Paris), Michael (1896-1938), Anton (1900-1942) and Natalia (1908-1950). The late Russian painter Dmitry Zhilinsky, author of portrait gallery of the Danish Royal family, is Serov’s relative as direct grandson of Serov’s sister Nadezhda, whose son Dmitry became Zhilinsky’s father.

=== Late work ===
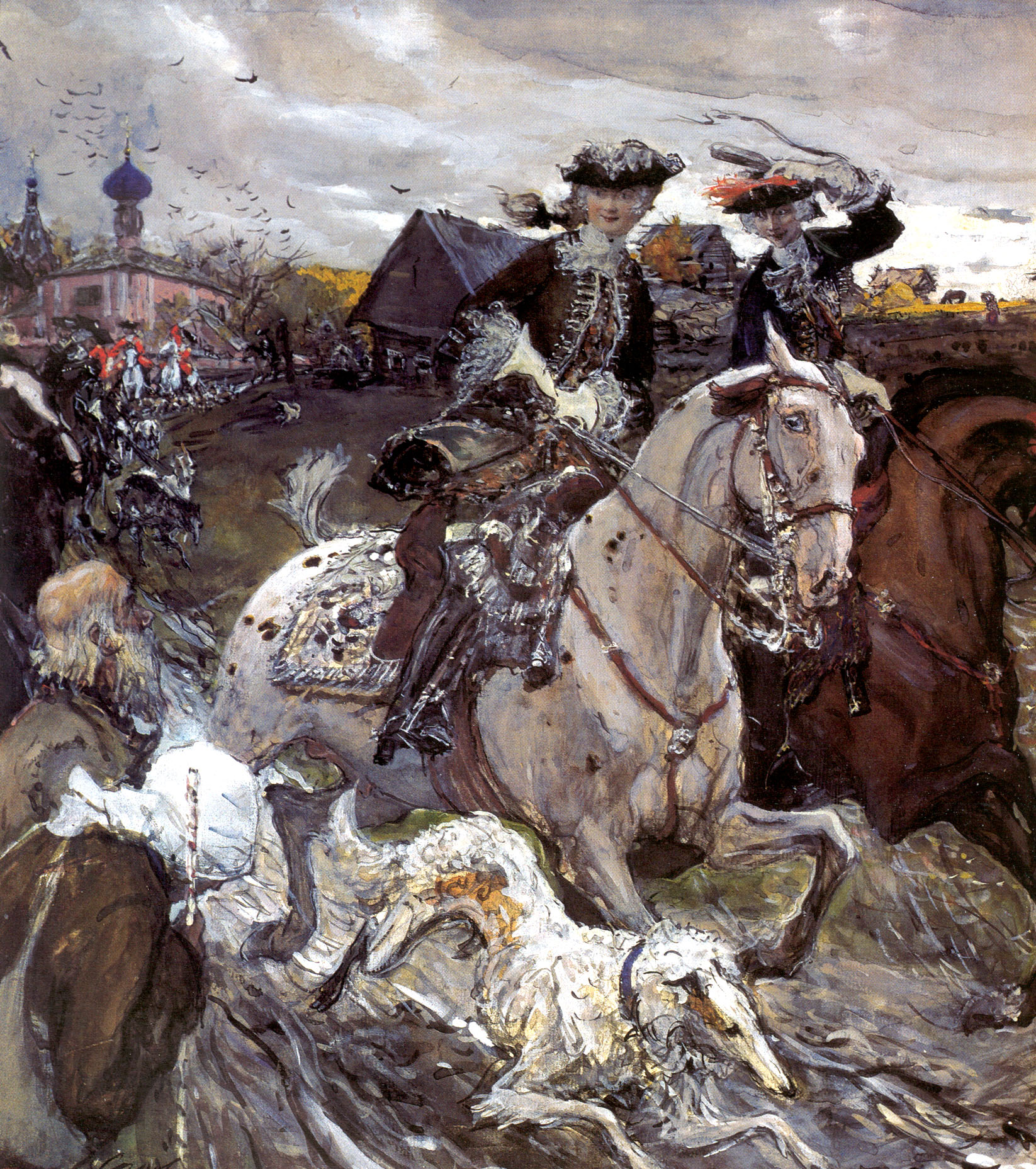
Peter II and Elizabeth Petrovna departing for the hunt, 1900, Russian Museum

During his late period, which began in 1900, Serov was a member of Mir Iskusstva, an influential Russian art association and magazine which grew, in part, out of dissatisfaction with the Itinerants movement. At the start of the 20th century, Serov was at a stylistic turning point: features of impressionism disappeared from his work, and his modernistic style developed, but the characteristic truthful and realistic comprehension of the nature of his subjects remained constant. In the early 20th century Serov created heroic portrait images; within the genre of the fashionable portrait, Serov focused on the dramatic depiction of creative artists, writers, actors, and musicians of import: Maxim Gorki's portraits (1904, A.M. Gorki's museum, Moscow); Maria Yermolova (1905) and Feodor Chaliapin (charcoal, 1905), both in the Tretyakov Gallery; and Helena Roerich (1909).

Serov's democratic beliefs were clearly shown during the Revolution from 1905 to 1907: he depicted a number of satirical figures exposing chastisers. A full member of the St. Petersburg Academy of Arts since 1903, in 1905 he resigned as a gesture of protest against the execution of striking workers and their families on 9 January, Bloody Sunday. His late creativity found expression in historical painting (Peter II and Elizabeth Petrovna departing for the hunt, 1900, Russian Museum), and depth of comprehension of the historical maintenance of an epoch (Peter I, distemper, 1907, Tretyakov Gallery).

The last years of Serov's life were marked by works on themes from classical mythology. While addressing images from the ancient tradition, Serov endowed classical subject matter with a personal interpretation.

=== Death ===
Valentin Serov died in Moscow on 5 December 1911, from stenocardia (an acute form of angina) that eventually led to cardiac arrest, ending in heart failure due to severe complications. He was buried at the Donskoye Cemetery. The Soviets had his remains exhumed and reburied at the Novodevichy Cemetery.

== Legacy ==
The best works of Serov are among the greatest of Russian realistic art. He taught in the Moscow School of Painting, Sculpture and Architecture from 1897 to 1909), and among his students were Pavel Kuznetsov, N. N. Sapunov, Martiros Saryan, Kuzma Petrov-Vodkin, N. P. Ulyanov, and Konstantin Yuon.

A 2016 exhibition of Serov's work at the Tretyakov Gallery in Moscow attracted record crowds which queued for long hours in freezing temperatures. Following the visit of Russian President Vladimir Putin, the crowd swelled to such an extent that one of the museum's doors was broken down. Minister of Culture Vladimir Medinsky ordered the exhibition—and the gallery's opening hours—to be extended, and a field canteen was deployed to provide the people who were standing in the lines with buckwheat porridge and hot tea.

A minor planet, 3547 Serov, discovered by Soviet astronomer Lyudmila Zhuravlyova in 1978, is named after him.

== Selected artwork ==
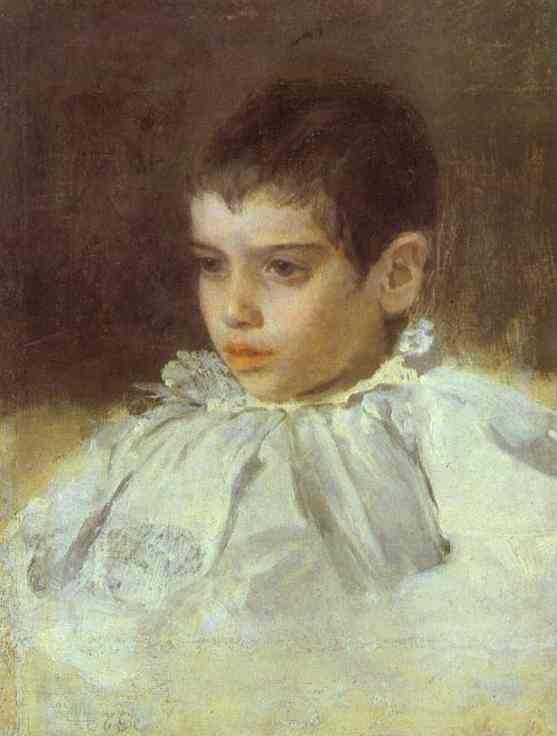
Portrait of Lialia (Adelaida) Simonovich (1880)

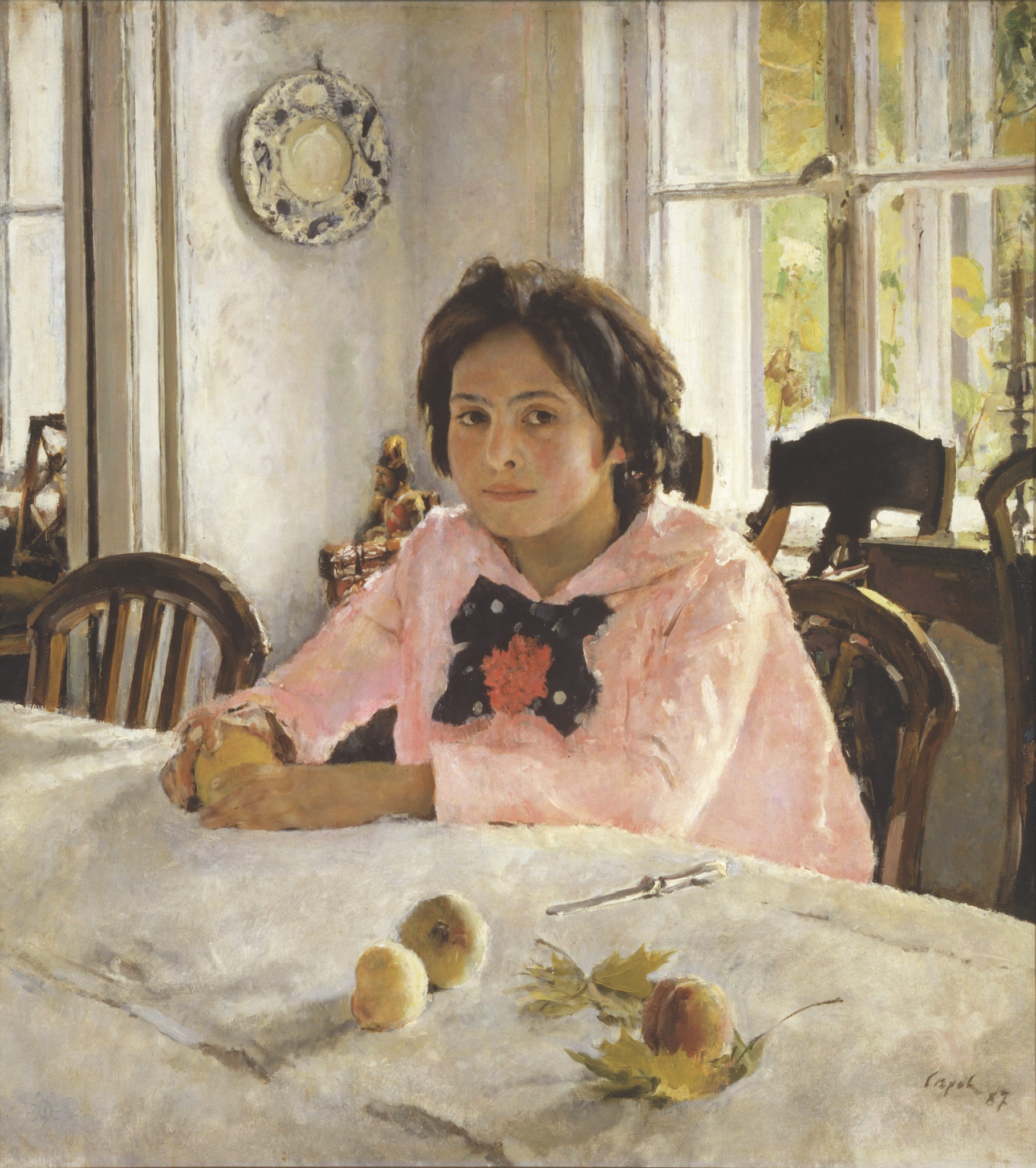
Vera Mamontova, the so-called Girl with Peaches (1887)

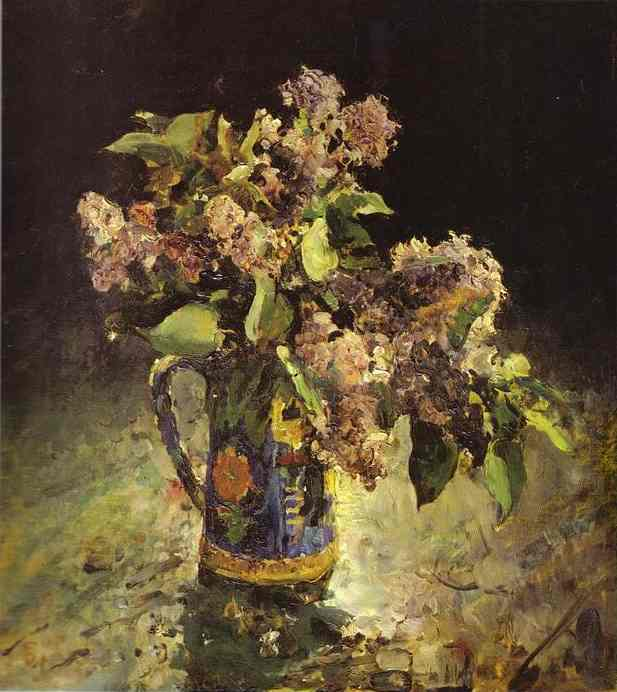
Lilacs in Vase (1887)

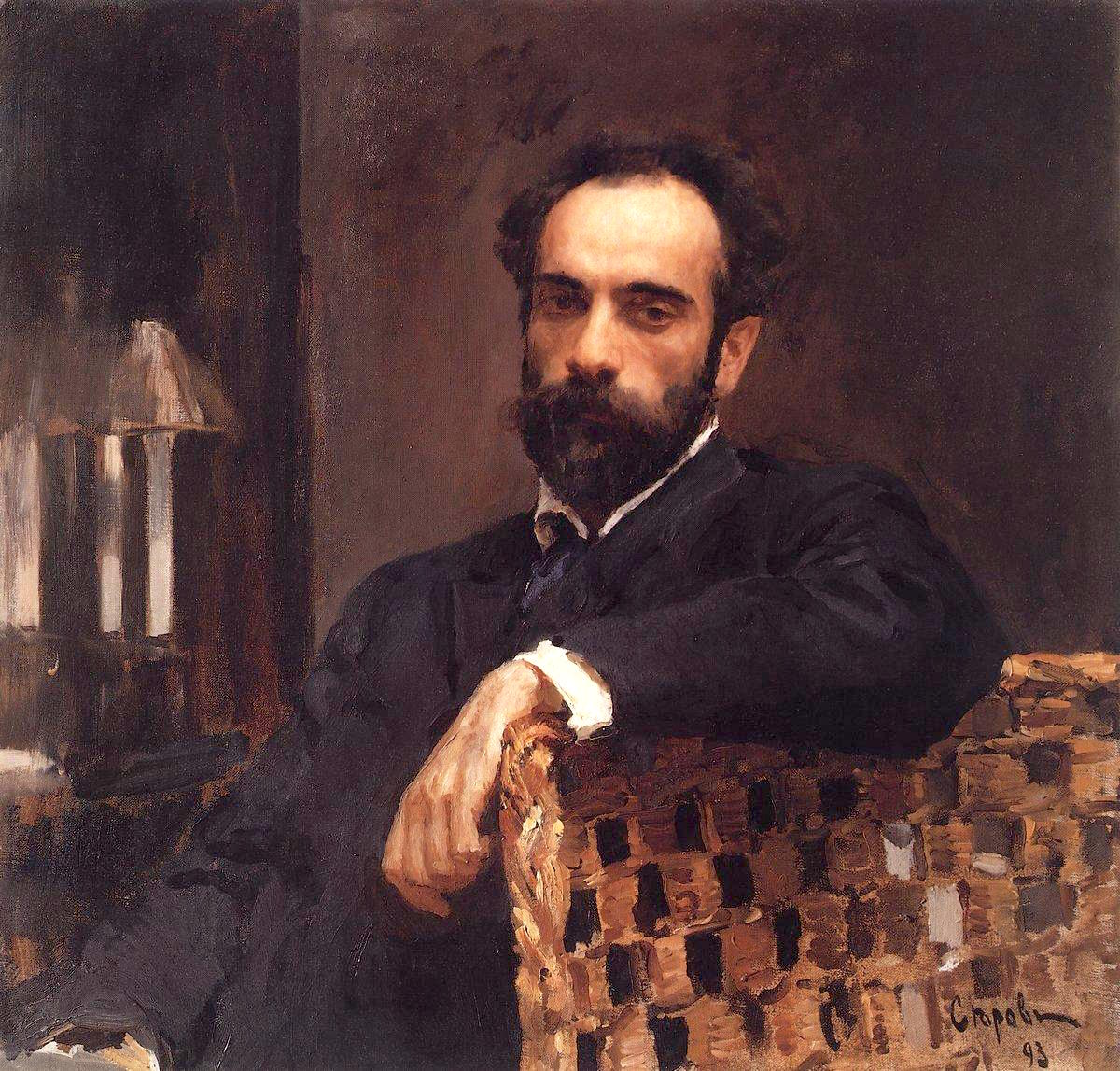
Isaak Levitan (1893)

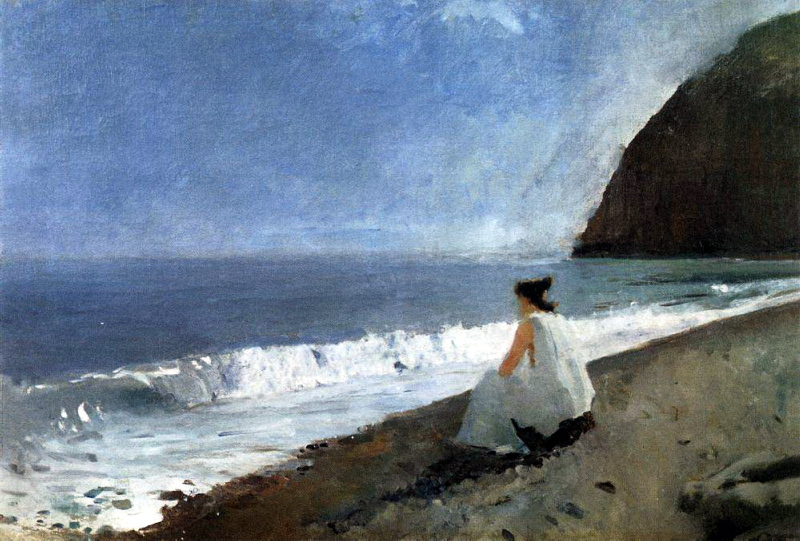
Iphigenia in Tauris (1893)

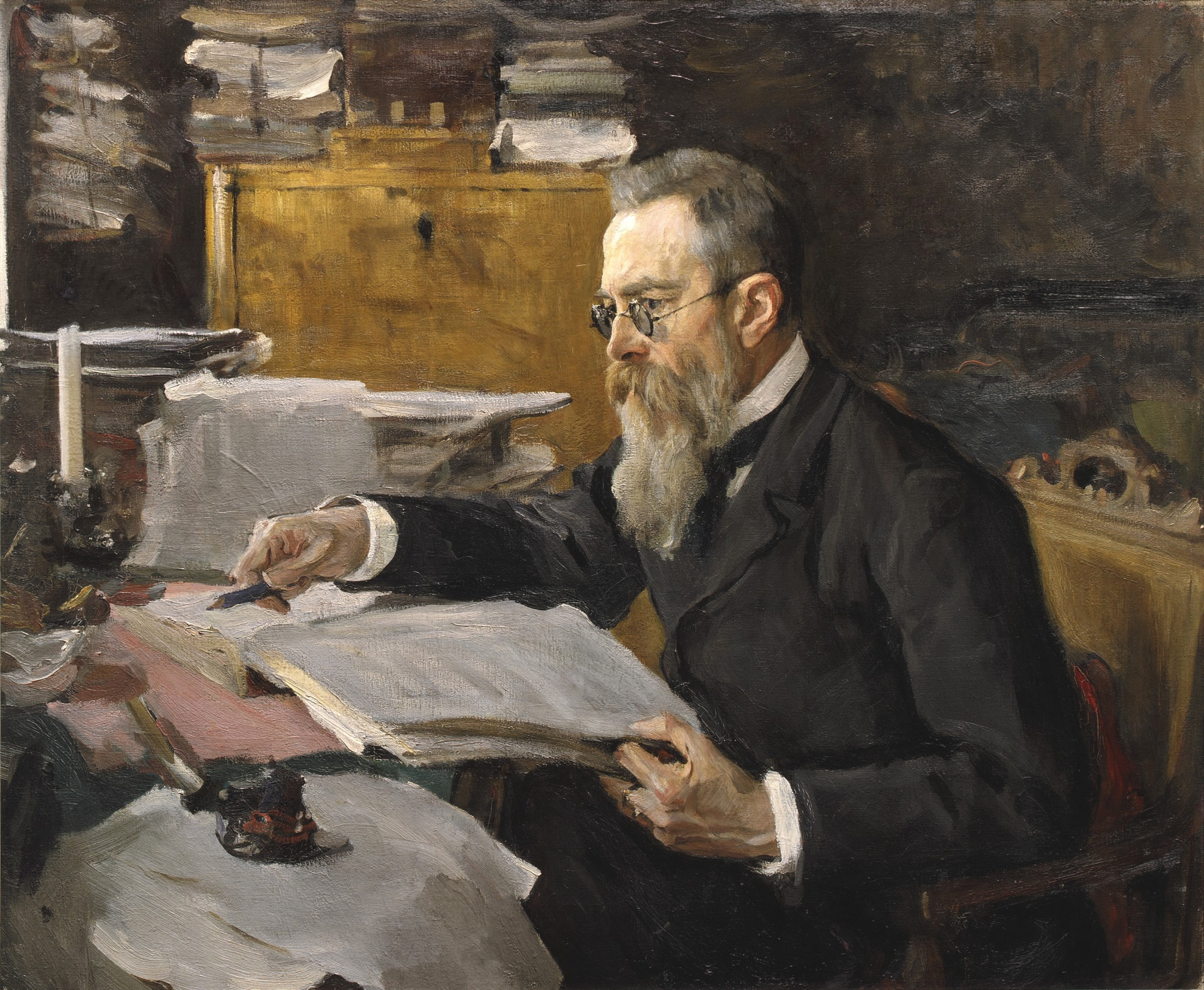
Nikolai Rimsky-Korsakov (1898)

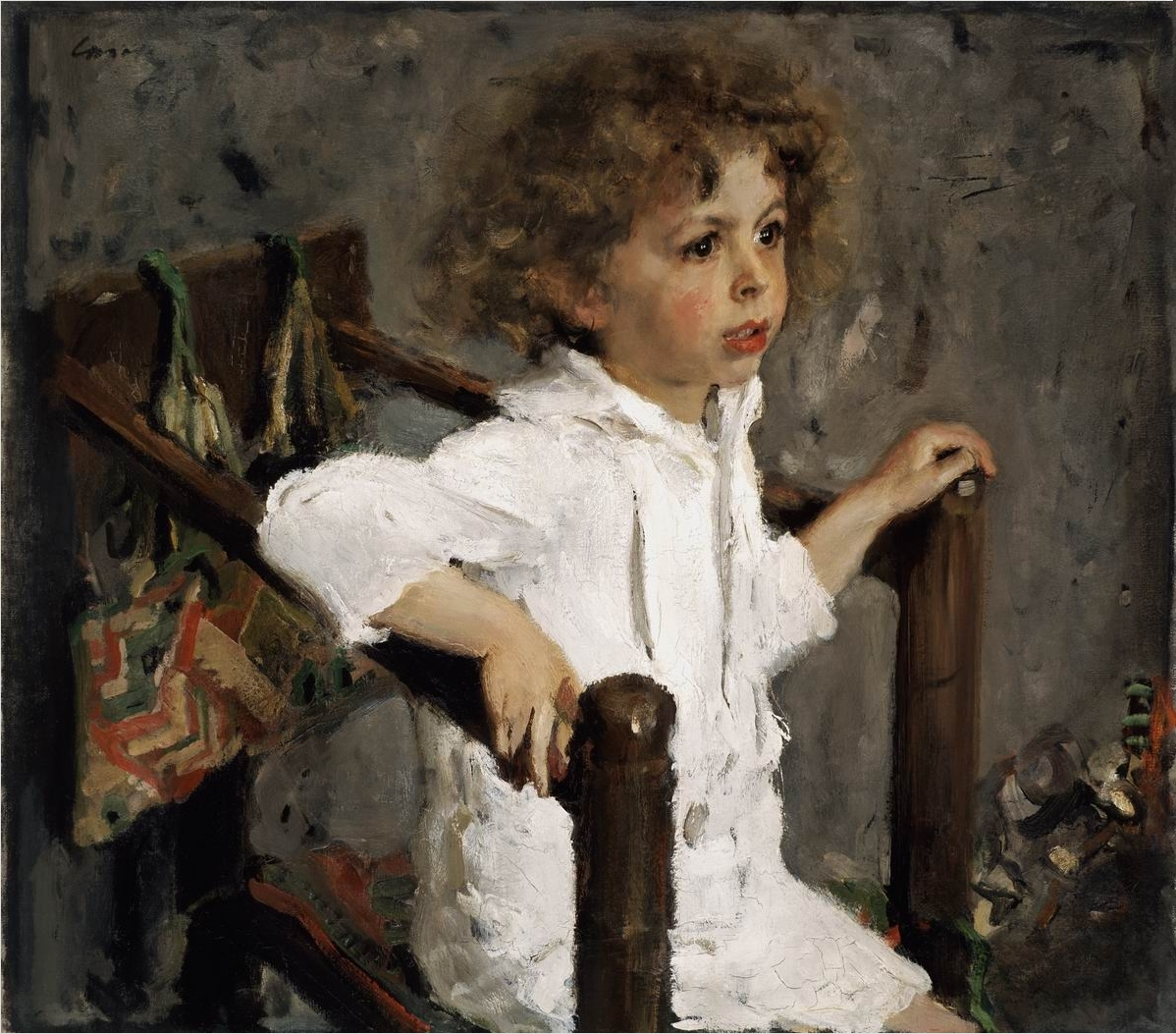
Mika Morozov, portrait of Margarita Morozova's son Mika (1901)

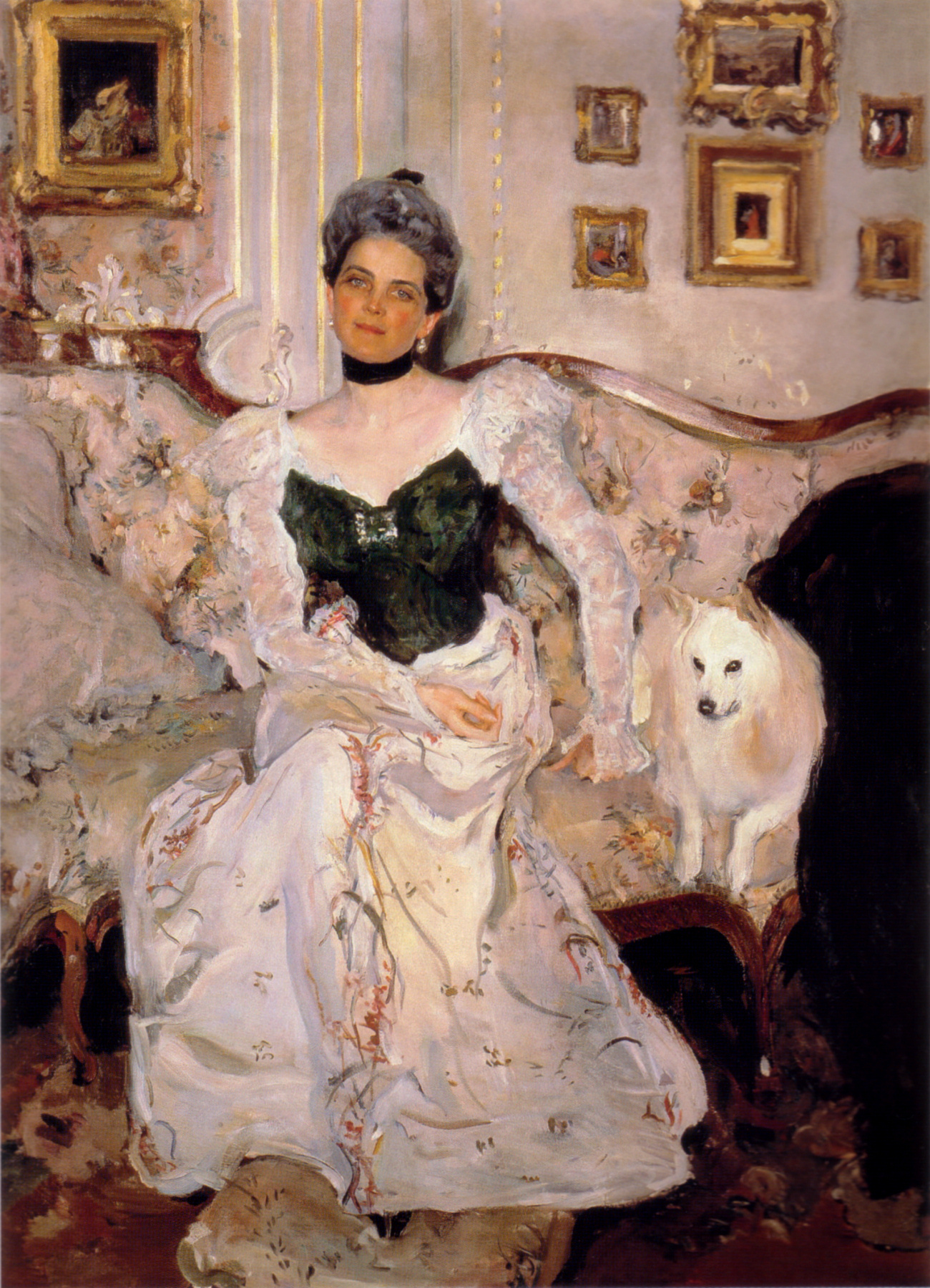
Portrait of Princess Zinaida Yusupova (1900-1902)

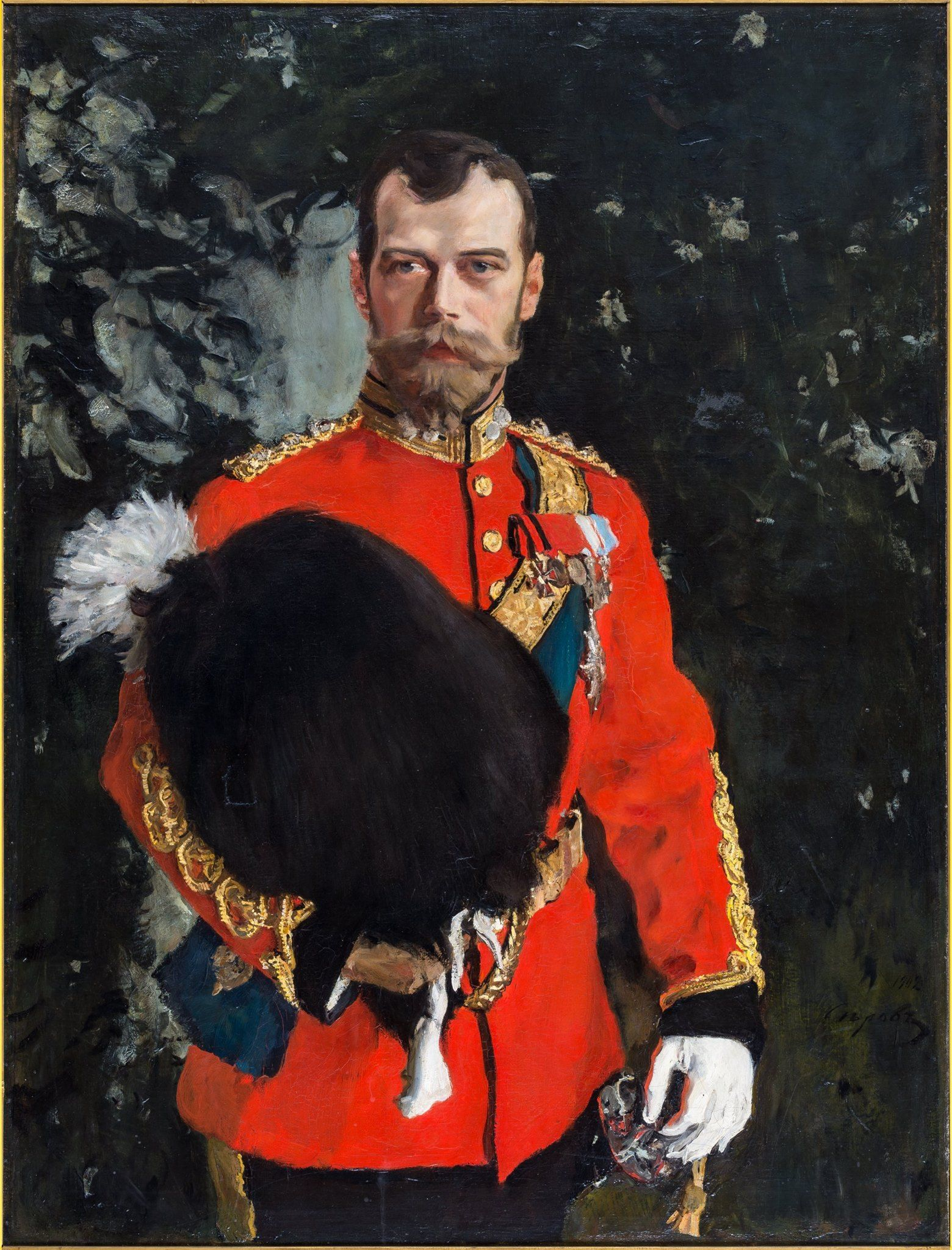
Portrait of Tsar Nicholas II (1902)

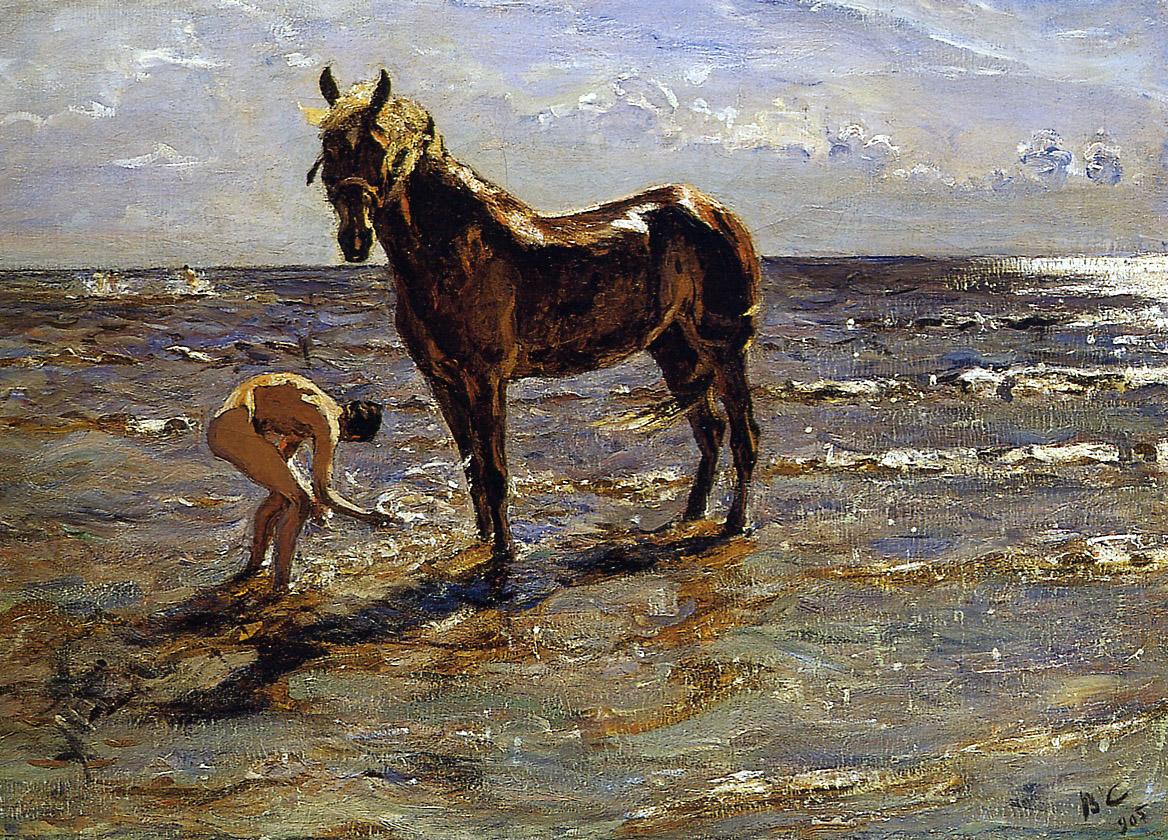
Bathing of a horse (1905)

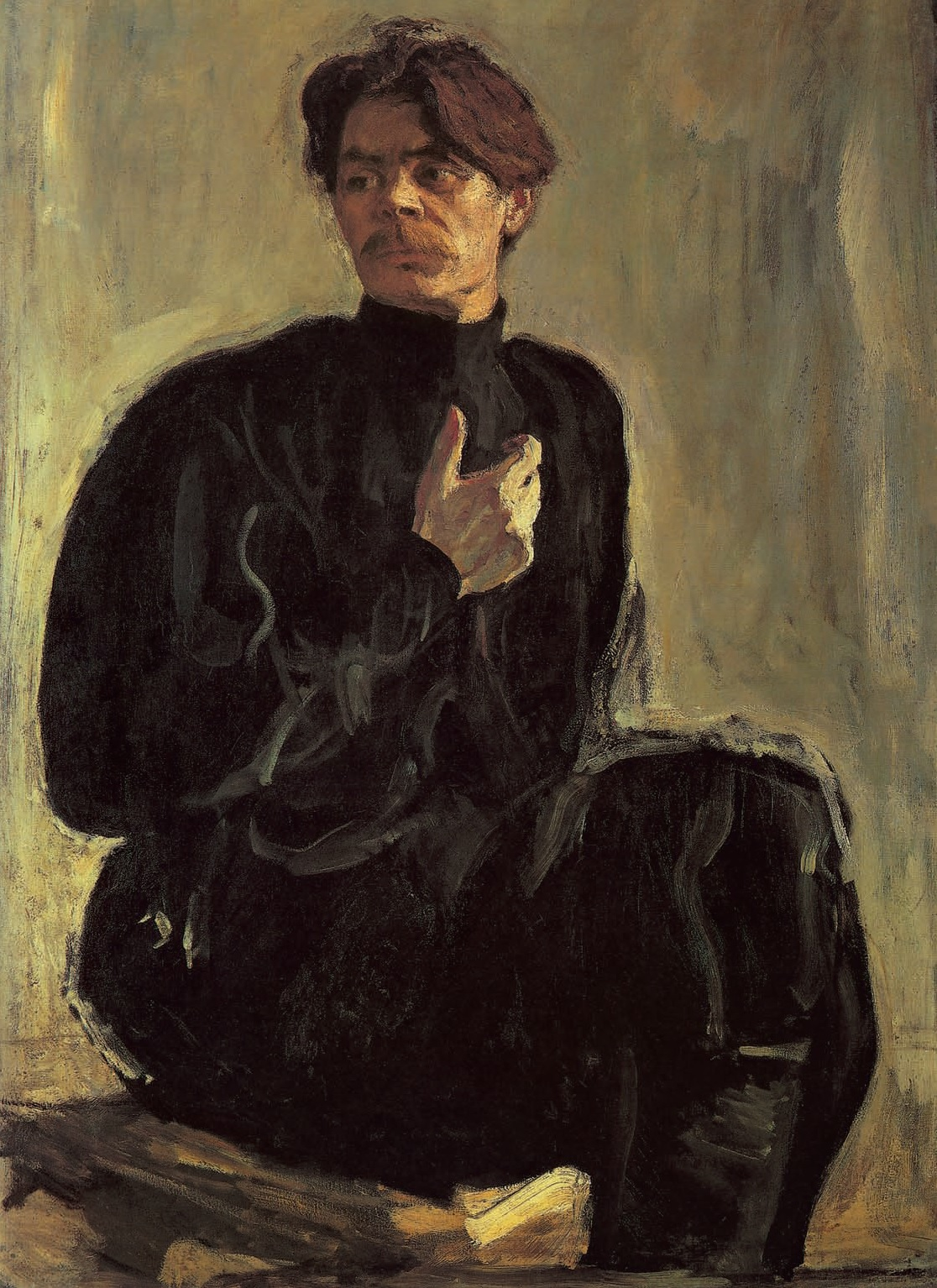
Portrait of Maxim Gorky (1905)

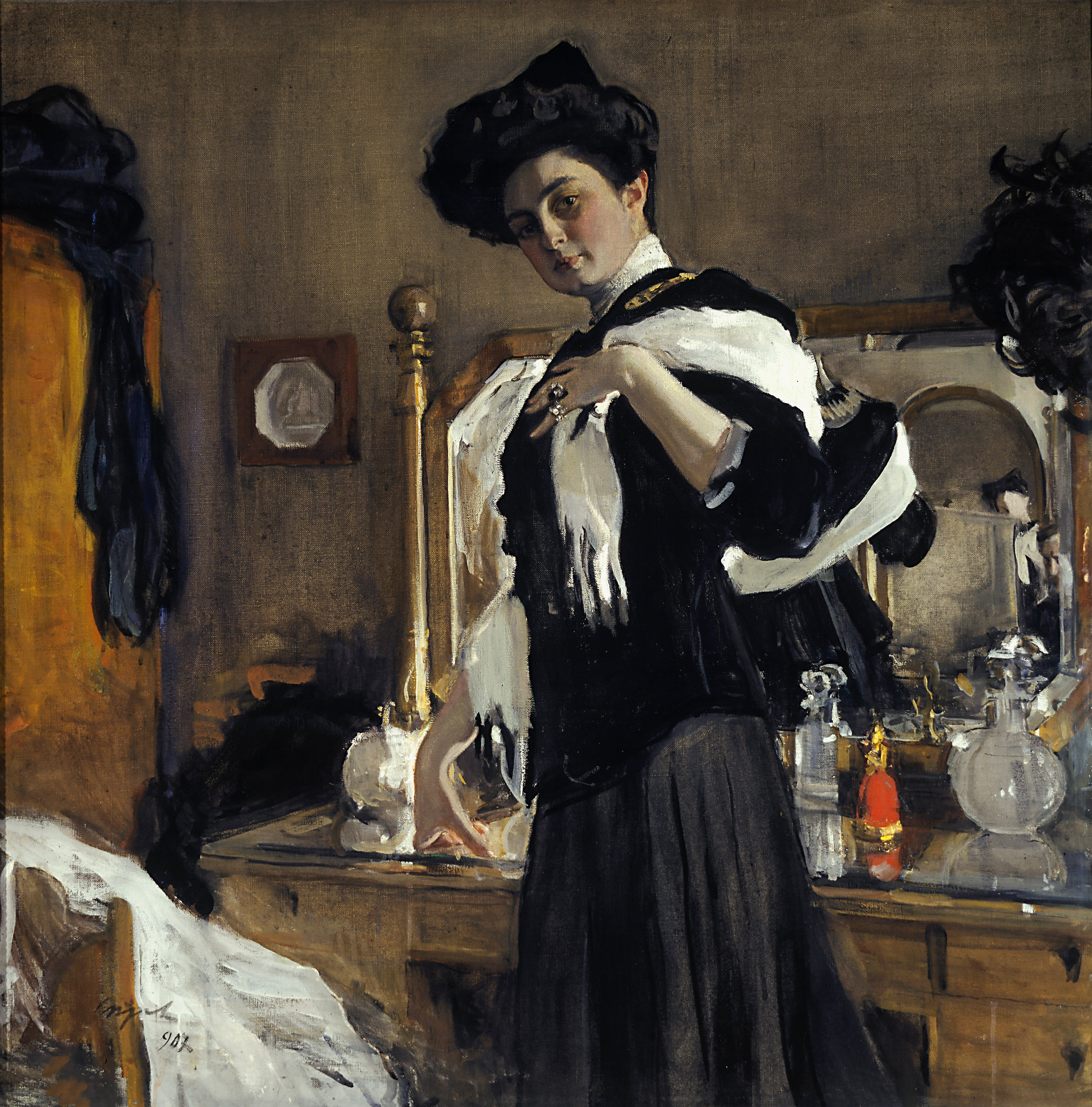
Portrait of Henriette Hirschmann (1907)

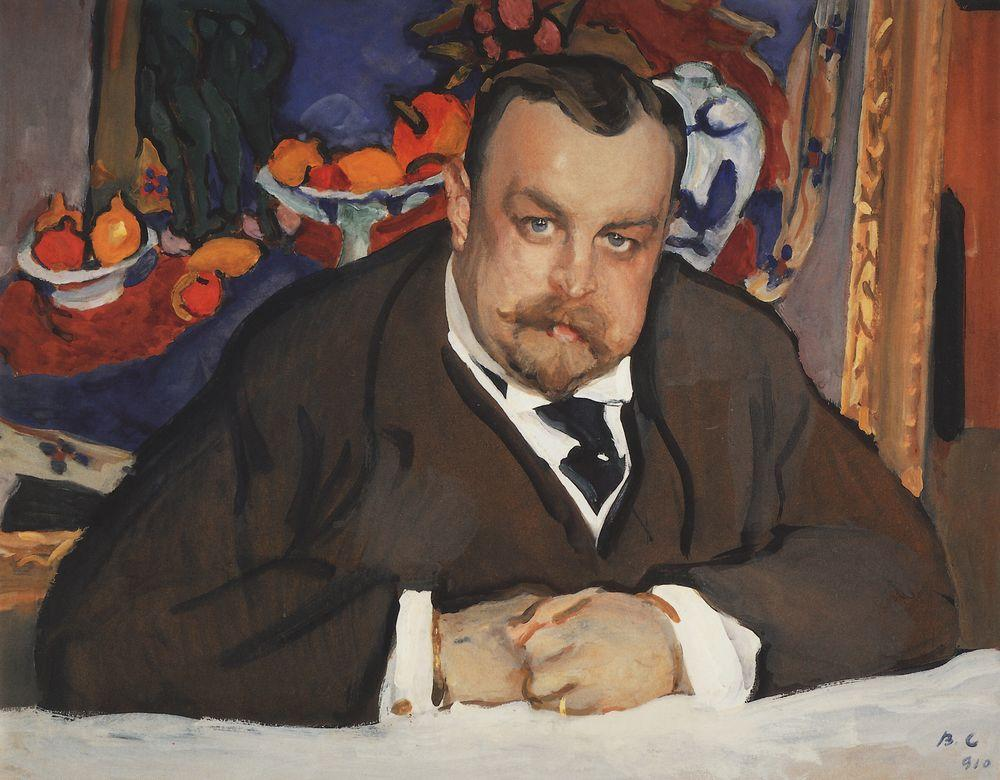
Portrait of Ivan Morozov (1910)

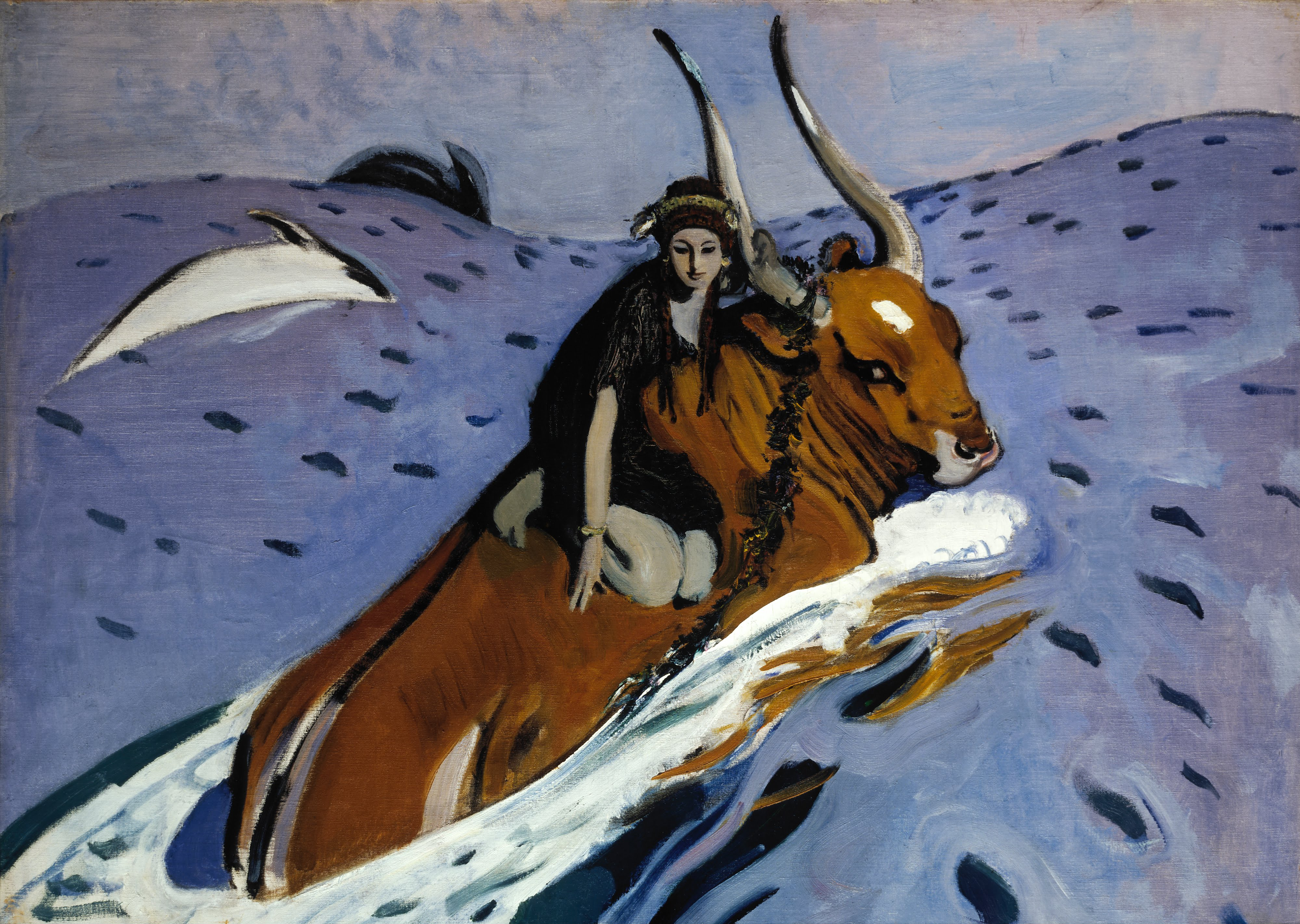
The Kidnapping of Europa (1910)

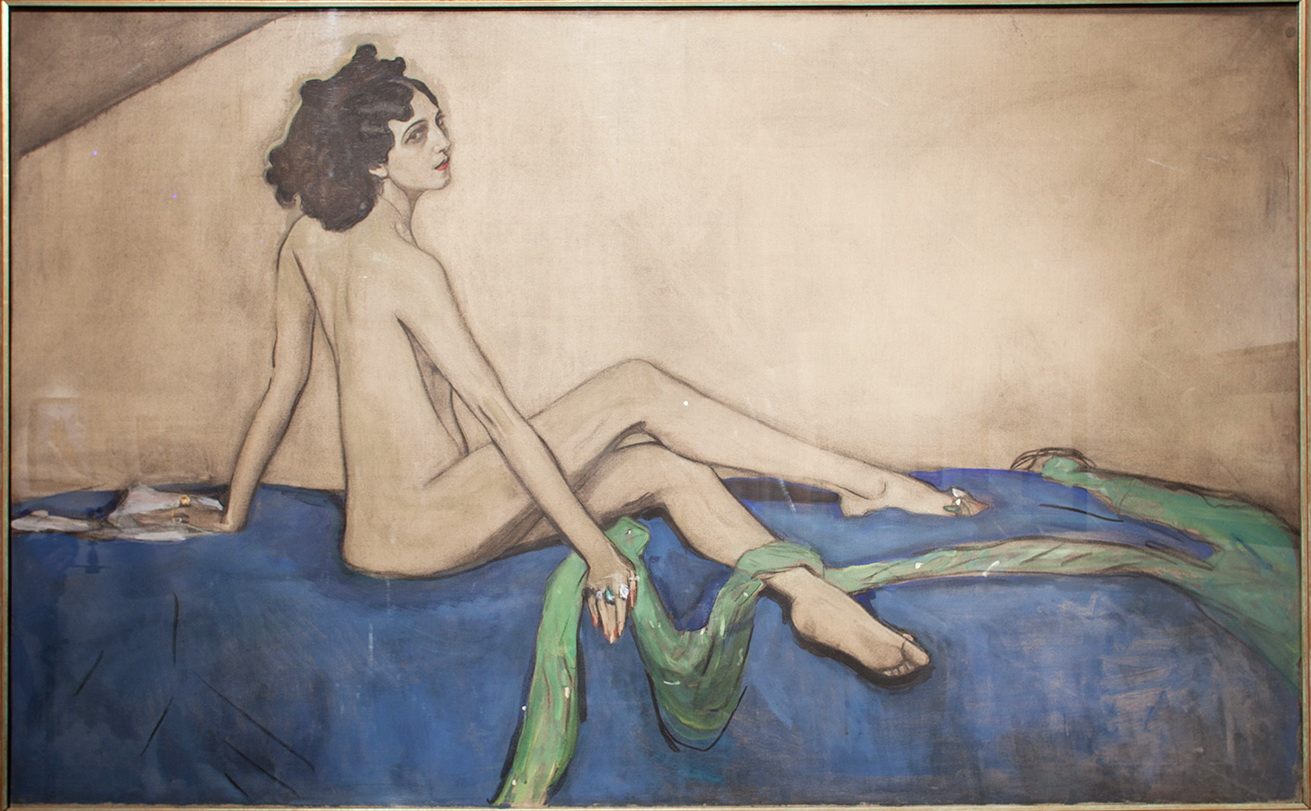
Portrait of Ida Rubinstein (1910)

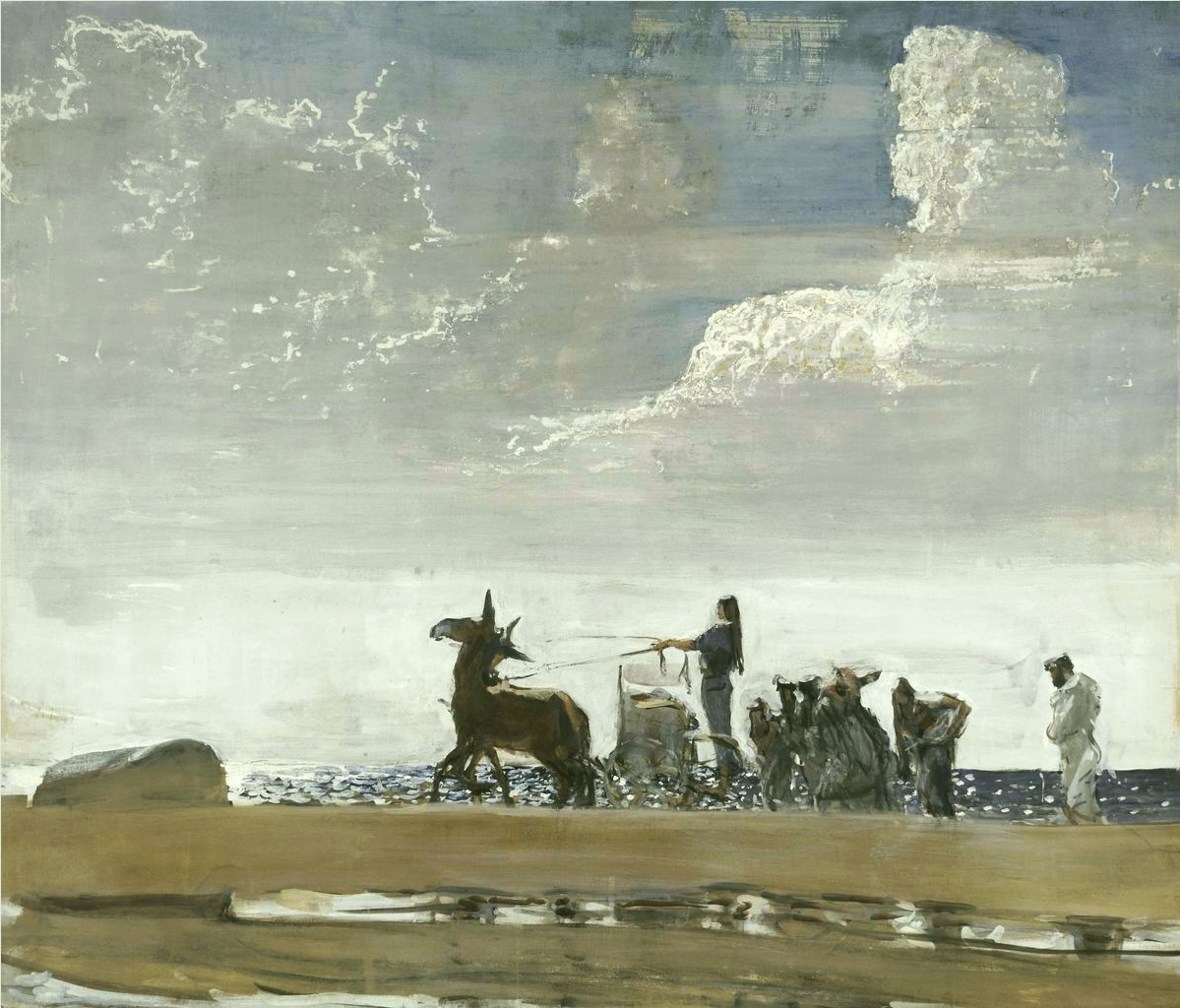
Odysseus and Nausicaa (1910)

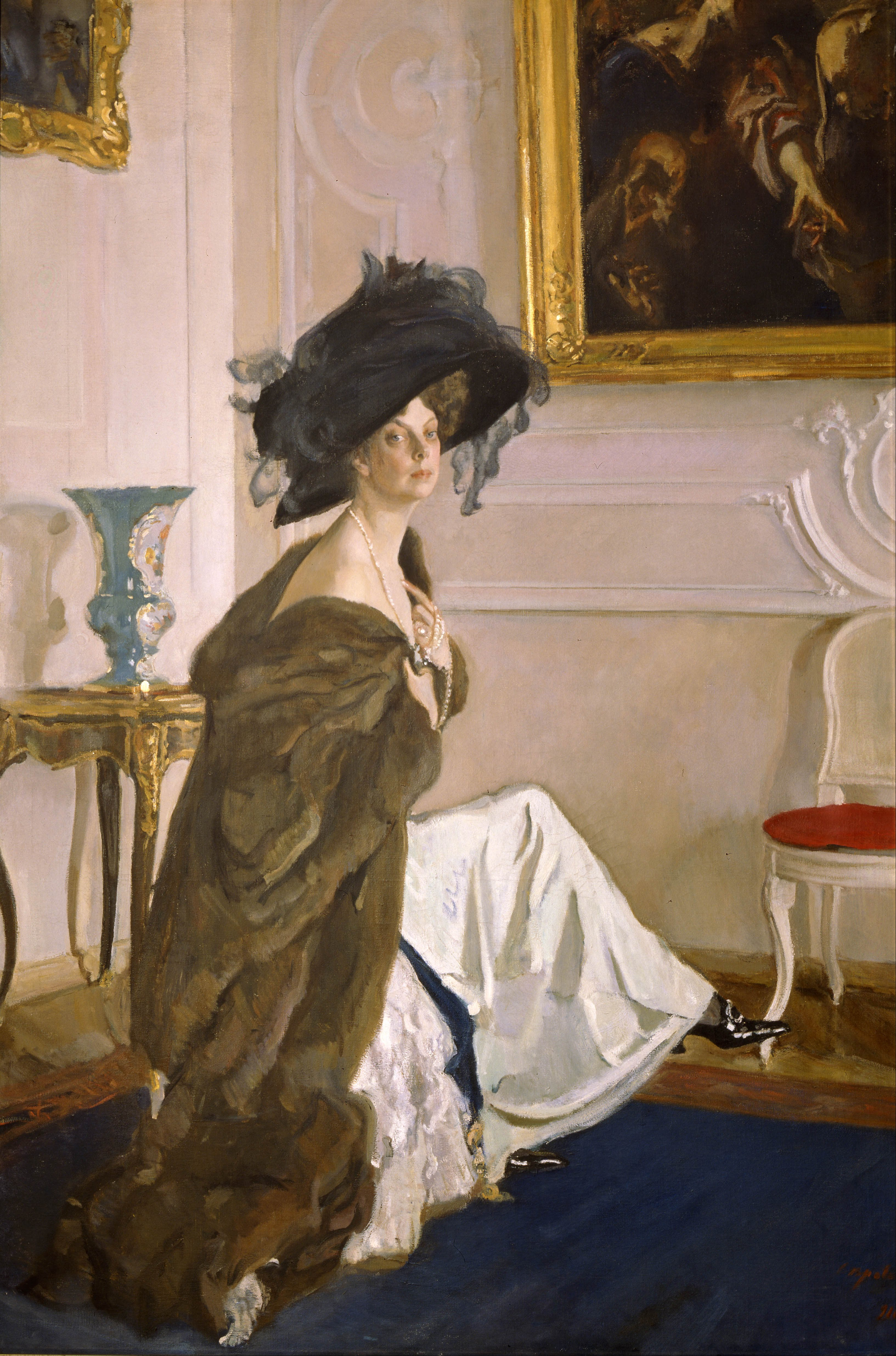
Portrait of Princess Olga Orlova (1911)

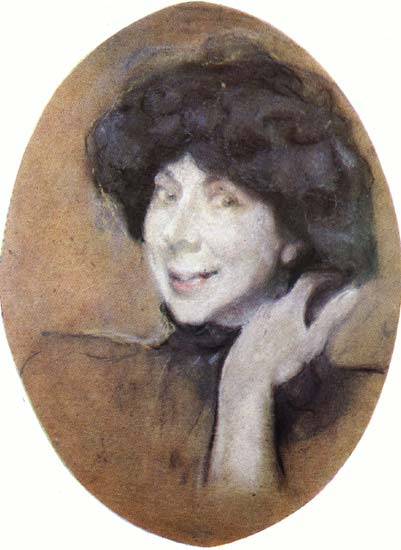
Anna Benois (1908)

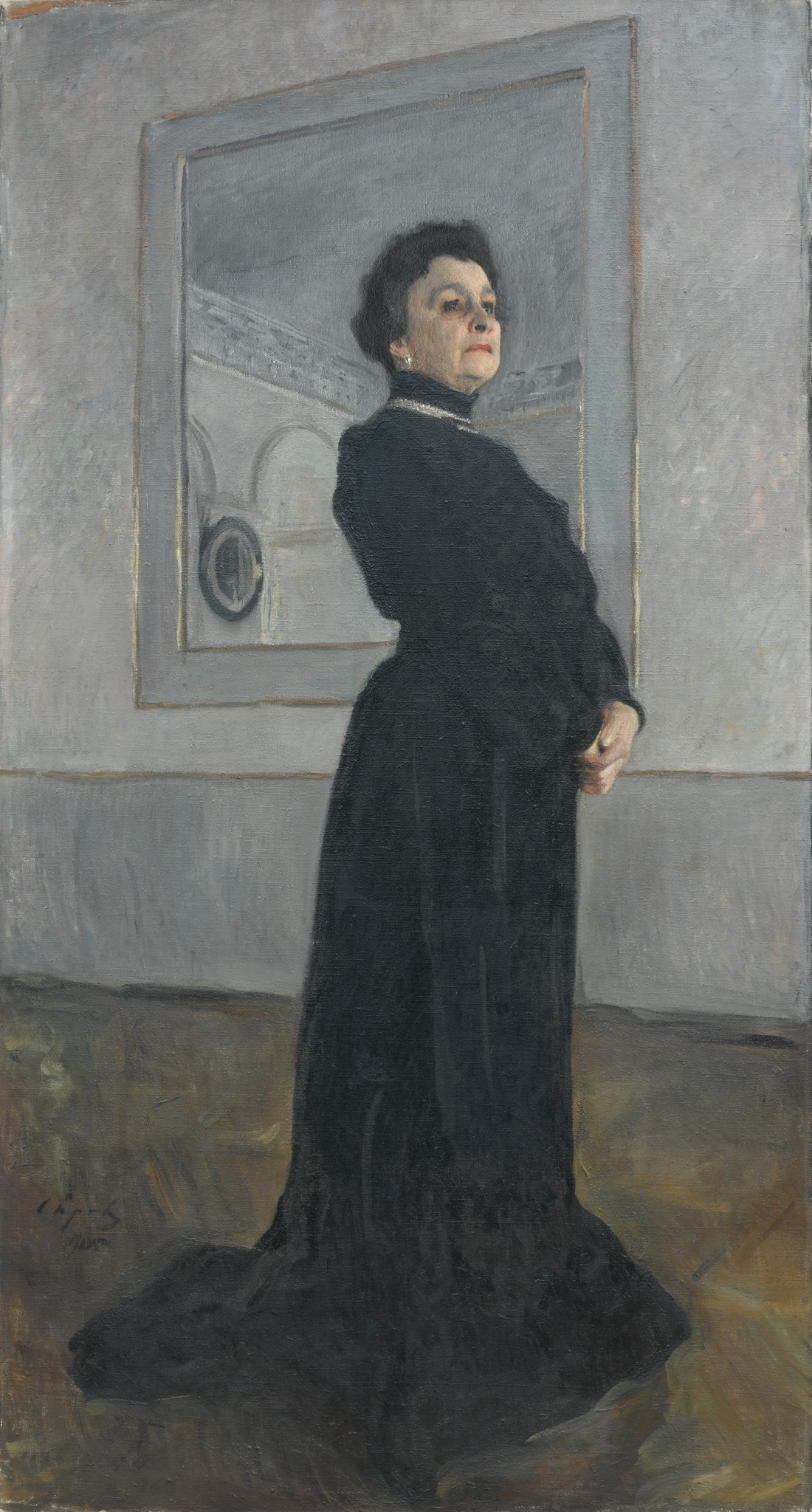
Portrait of Maria Yermolova (1905)

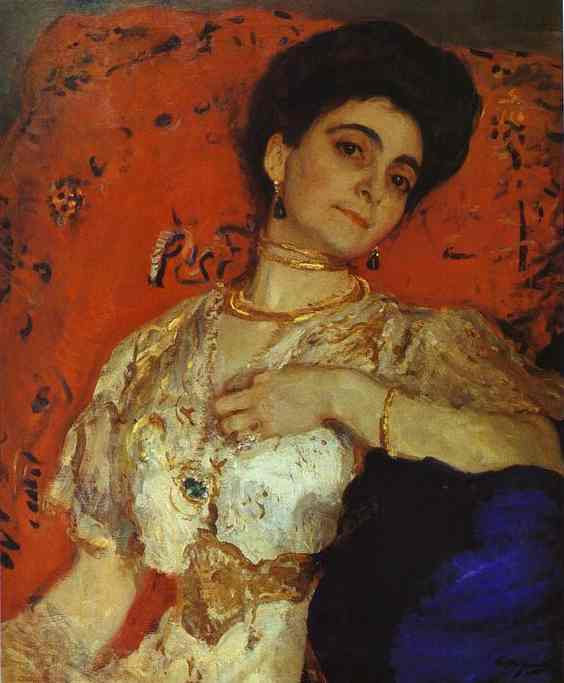
Portrait of Maria Akimova (1908)

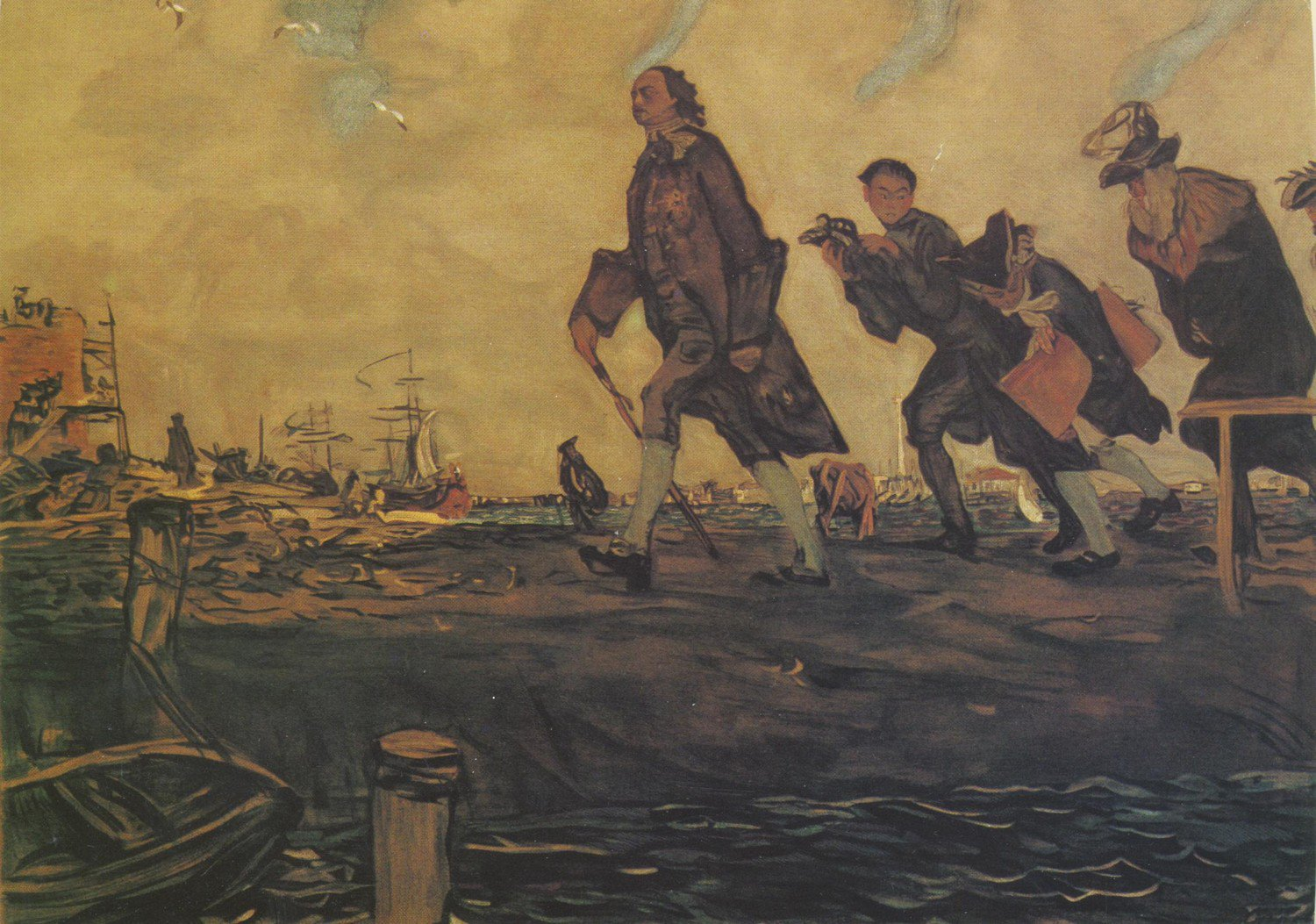
Peter I walking along the embankment of St. Petersburg (1907)
