= Lavrentyev =

Lavrentyev or Lavrentiev (Russian: Лаврентьев) and Lavrentyeva (Russian: Лаврентьева; feminine) is a common Russian surname.

People with this surname include:

- Arseniy Lavrentyev (born 1983), Russian-born Portuguese swimmer
- Boris Innokentievich Lavrentiev (1892–1944), Soviet histologist
- Mikhail Lavrentyev (1900–1980), a Soviet mathematician
- Oleg Lavrentiev (1926–2011), a Soviet-Ukrainian physicist, the author of idea of a thermonuclear bomb
- Sergei Lavrentyev (born 1972), a Russian footballer and coach
- Yekaterina Lavrentyeva (born 1981), a Russian luger
