= Anatoly Leman =

Russian writer (1856–1913)

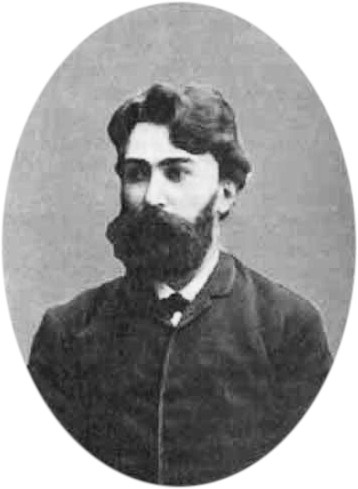
- Born: Анатолий Иванович Леман; 13 June 1859; Moscow, Russian Empire
- Died: 24 September 1913 (aged 54); Saint Petersburg, Russian Empire
- Occupations: writer, publisher, music instruments manufacturer

Anatoly Ivanovich Leman (Russian: Анатолий Иванович Леман, 13 June 1859, Moscow, Imperial Russia, – 24 September 1913, Saint Petersburg, Imperial Russia) was a Russian writer, and editor, also known as a manufacturer of musical string instruments and a professional billiards player.

Leman regularly published stories and novels in Nablyudatel, Istorichesky Vestnik, Vsemirnaya Illyustratsia. Some of them came as a separate editions, including (Russian: Дворянская повесть, lit. 'The Gentry's Tale', 1886) and (Russian: Кефир, lit. 'Sour milk', 1891). While in Moscow, from 1884 to 1885 he edited the magazine Razvlechenye.

He authored the book of memoirs The Life of a Cadet (Очерки кадетской жизни, 1879), the Theory of the Billiards textbook (Теория игры на биллиарде, 1885) as well as a dozen of luthier's guides and other books on the craft of violin and cello, of which the best known were The Book on Violin (1892) and Violin Acoustics (1903). During the 1905 Revolution he published the newspaper Rabochaya Nedelya (Working Week), was arrested and in 1906 acquitted.
