= Pyotr Petrov =

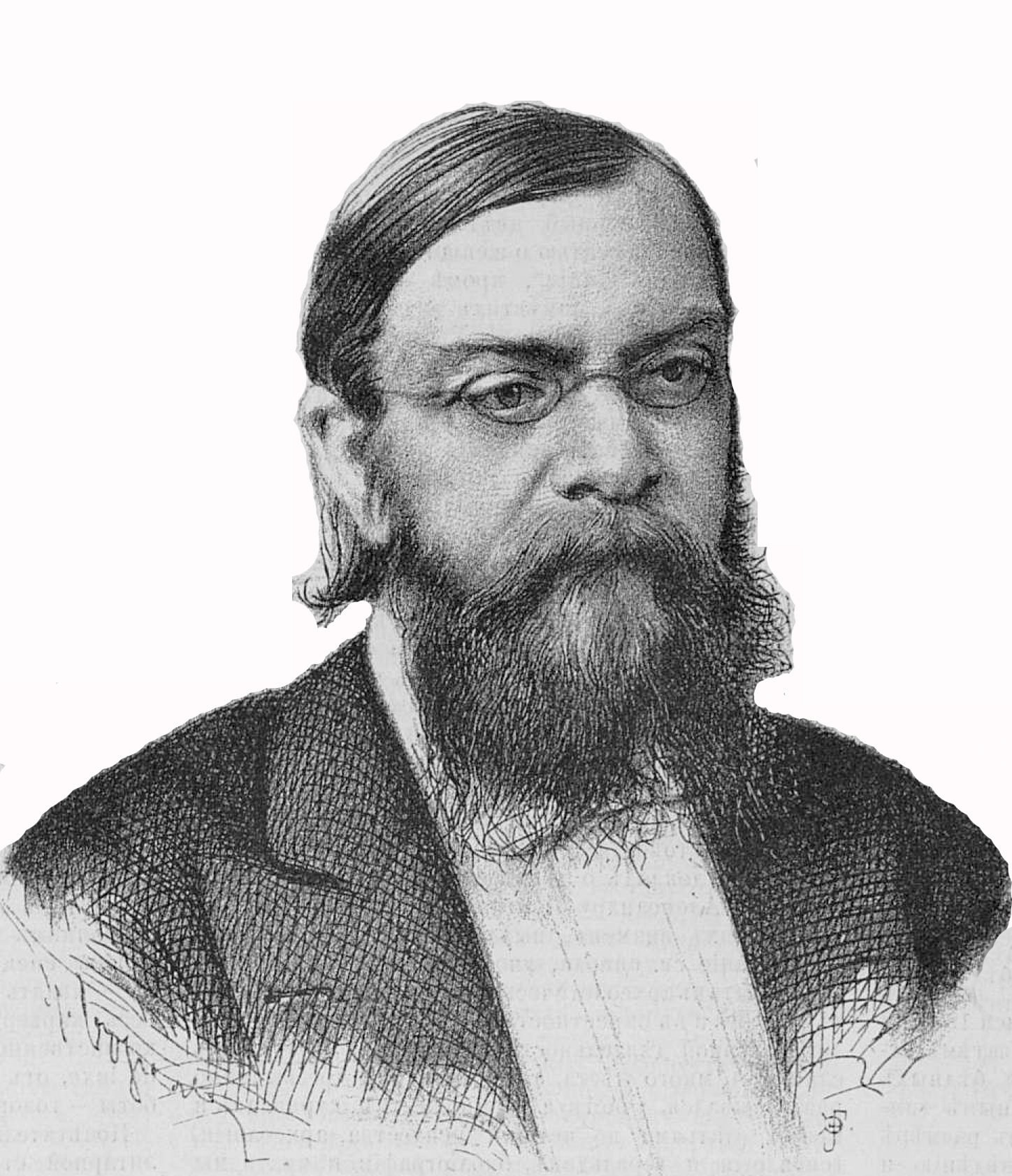
- Portrait by Pyotr Borel, Vsemirnaya Illustratsiya, 1891
- Born: Пётр Николаевич Петров; July 1, 1827; Saint Petersburg, Imperial Russia
- Died: April 10, 1891 (aged 63); Saint Petersburg, Imperial Russia
- Occupations: writer, arts historian, art critic, genealogist

Pyotr Nikolayevich Petrov (Russian: Пётр Николаевич Петров; 1 July 1827, in Saint Petersburg, Imperial Russia – 10 April 1891, in Saint Petersburg, Imperial Russia) was a Russian writer, arts historian and critic, genealogist, bibliographer, an honourable member of the Imperial Academy of Arts and a member of the Russian Archeological Society.

Petrov co-edited the Brockhaus and Efron Encyclopedic Dictionary, contributed more than 300 articles on art, history and topography to the Russian Encyclopedic Dictionary edited at the time by professor Ilya Berezin and authored a host of biographical essays on Russian artists (like Pavel Fedotov and Karl Bryullov, among others) published by Illyustratsii magazine in 1861—1866. He also edited the Materials for the Hundred Years' History of the Imperial Academy of Arts. He authored the History of the Russian Nobility (1886, in two volumes), as well as the History of Saint Petersburg (1882). For Vsemirnaya Illyustratsia he compiled The Album of Russian Fairytales and Bylinas (1875), The Album for Peter the Great's 200th Jubilee (with Sergey Shubinsky, 1872), and the biography of Peter the Great (1873).

Petrov wrote several historical novels, among them Semya Volnodumtsev (Семья вольнодумцев, Freethinkers' Family, 1872, with Viktor Klyushnikov), Balakirev (Балакирев, 1881) and Tsarsky sud (Царский суд, The Tsar's Judgement, 1877). He completed the unfinished Nestor Kukolnik's novel Ioann III.
