= Apollon Korinfsky =

Russian poet and journalist

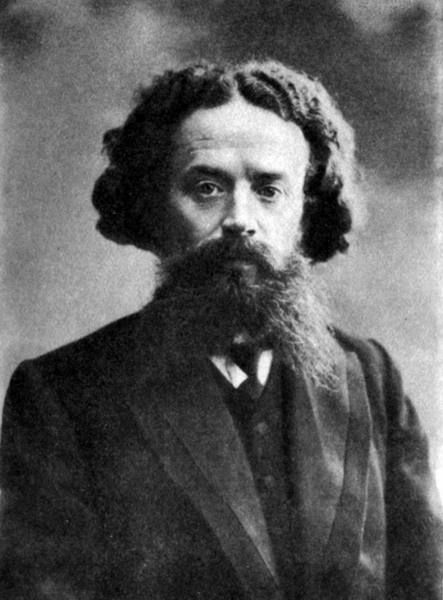
- Born: Аполлон Аполлонович Коринфский; 29 August 1868; Simbirsk, Russian Empire
- Died: 12 January 1937 (aged 68); Kalinin, Soviet Union
- Occupations: poet, journalist, writer, translator, memoirist.
- Years active: 1886—1930

Apollon Apollonovich Korinfsky (Russian: Аполлон Аполлонович Коринфский; 29 August 1868 – 12 January 1937) was a Russian poet, journalist, writer, translator and memoirist.

== Biography ==
Korinfsky was born in Simbirsk to a local judge, his name tracing to his grandfather on father's side, a self-educated Mordovian peasant.

Having debuted as a published author in 1886 (under the pseudonym Boris Kolyupanov) with several poems and stories, Korinfsky in 1889 moved to Moscow (where he wrote for Rossiya and Russkoye Bogatstvo), then further to Saint Peterburg in 1891. There he contributed to the magazines Nashe Vremya (Our Time) and Vsemirnaya Illyustratsiya and edited the short-lived magazine Sever (which opened and closed in 1888).

In 1895—1904 he worked as an assistant editor for Pravitelstvenny Vestnik (Government's Herald) under Konstantin Sluchevsky, his friend, writing mostly essays on history and ethnography which in 1901 were collected in the compilation Narodnaya Rus (Folklore of Russia). Among the authors whose work he translated were Heinrich Heine, Samuel Coleridge, Adam Mickiewicz and Taras Shevchenko, as well as Yanka Kupala, with whom he was on friendly terms.

As a poet Korinfsky concentrated on the life of Russian peasantry, made full use of the folklore tradition, and considered himself an heir to Alexey K. Tolstoy. His books of poetry, Pesni Serdtsa (Songs of the Heart, 1894), Chyornye Rozy (Black Roses, 1896), Na Rannei Zorke (At Early Dawn, 1896, the collection of the verse for children), as well as several others, were popular and re-issued several times.

Korinfsky greeted the February 1917 Revolution and was horrified with the October Bolshevik coup. He stayed in the country, but stopped writing altogether. In 1928, he was arrested for being a member of literary circle, then charged with 'anti-Soviet agitation'. Deported from Leningrad in 1929, he found himself a job as a proofreader in Kalinin and lived there till his death in 1937. Ironically, his last published work happened to be the memoirs on Lenin whom he had been, as it turned out, a classmate of for seven years in Simbirsk. Later the evidence was published that the future Soviet leader often visited the Korinfskys' home and made full use of their library, although the poet himself realized the Bolshevik chief and his former school friend were one and the same person, only in 1917, when Lenin came to power.
