= Diodor Kolpinskiy =

Russian priest (1892–1932)

Diodor Valeryanovich Kolpinskiy (November 10, 1892 in Pskov, Russian Empire – July 8, 1932 in Tianjin, Manchukuo) was an Eastern Catholic priest from Russia and a member of the Russian apostolate.

== Biography ==
Diodor Kolpinskiy was born in Pskov to a Russian Orthodox family. He graduated from the First Cadet Corps (Saint Petersburg), then enrolled at the Pontifical Gregorian University in Rome, at the end of a degree of doctor of philosophy. Returning to Russia he studied at the Faculty of History and Philosophy at Saint Petersburg State University. In 1911 along with his mother, aunt and grandmother, he converted in 1911 to Latin Rite Catholicism, and left Russia for studies in Rome. In 1915 was ordained a priest of the Latin Rite, and was appointed parochial vicar at St. Stanislaus Church in Saint Petersburg. In 1917, he transferred to the Byzantine Rite and served as the secretary at the Synod which was convened by Metropolitan Andrey Sheptytsky in 1917 in Petrograd and which established the Russian Catholic Apostolic Exarchate of Russia. Father Kolpinsky read aloud in both Russian and in Ecclesiastical Latin the act which established the Exarchate. Kolpinsky was a member of the "Society of Champions of the Reunion of Churches." In 1921 he emigrated to Poland, where for a time he returned to the Eastern Orthodox Church. He served in Old Ritualist Orthodox community in Wojnowo, and later transferred to Vienna. Around 1924 he served in the Orthodox church in Berlin. Later returned to Catholicism. From 1927 he taught at the University of Lublin and at the Missionary Institute in Lublin. At the institute, he operated two temple. For the temple of the Eastern rite Kolpinsky gave his own design, built iconostasis in old style, for the Latin Rite church created the project marble throne in the Romanesque style. Since 1927 Kolpinsky started to issue only at the time of the Russian Catholic magazine " Kitezh (magazine) "in Warsaw, and worked closely with Russian émigré publications. In 1929 he was sent to the Russian Catholic Apostolic Exarchate of Harbin and served as headmaster of the Lycee Saint Nicholas (Harbin). Died on July 8, 1932, in Tianjin from appendicitis.

== Publications ==
Kitezh. Warsaw. 1928, No. 1-2, 3–4, 5–6; 1929, No. 4-8.

Catholicism Russian Far East//Kitezh. 1931, No. 1.

== Sources ==
Eulogy (St George), Met. The path of my life. Moscow: Moscow Worker, VPMD. 1994. with. 529.

Tretjakewitsch L. Bishop Michel d'Herbigny, SJ and Russia. Augustinus-Verlag Wurzburg. 1990. p. 56, 171, 181, 188.

Church bells . 1930, No. 1. with. 163., No. 3. with. 147.

Vasily, Deacon FSI . Leonid Fedorov. - Rome, 1966.

Joseph Germanovich, Fr. Kіtay-Sіbіr-Maskva (uspamіny), Munich, 1962. (Second Edition - Mensk-SPb.: Neuski prastsyag, 2003. 299 p.). (Russian translation: China, Siberia, Moscow. Melbourne, 1997. P. 14.)

Truth and the Life . Moscow, 1993, No. 6.

Russian Catholic messenger . 1935, No. 3.

K. Nikolaev Eastern Rite. Paris: YMCA Press, 1950.

A purine wreath on the grave father Diodorus Kolpino, 1892-1932: Obituary / / Sail. Shanghai . 1932, No. 10. with. 126–127.

Union catalog of periodicals and serials in libraries of the Russian diaspora in Moscow: 1917-1996 gg. M. ROSSPEN, 1999.

Khisamutdinov AA Russian emigration in the Asia-Pacific region and South America: Bibliographical Dictionary. Vladivostok: Far Eastern University Publishing House, 2000. with. 162.

China and the Russian emigration in the diaries I. and A. Serebrennikov 1919–1934. v. 2. M: ROSPEN, 2006.
