= Pyotr Borel =

Russian painter

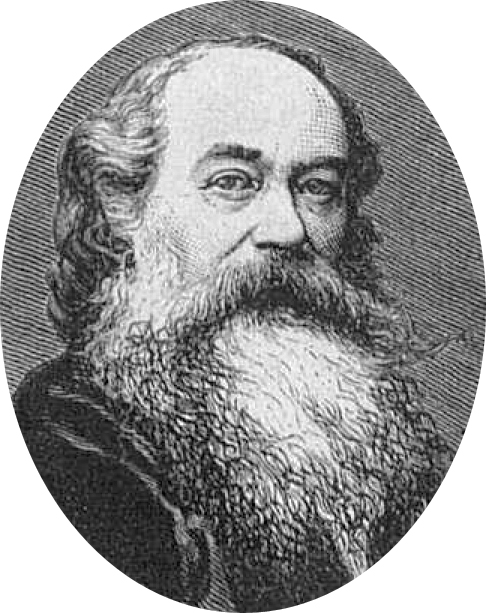
- Vsemirnaya Illustratsiya, 1878
- Born: Pyotr Fyodorovich Borel; Пётр Фёдорович Борель; 1829; Russian Empire
- Died: October 1898 (aged 68–69); Saint Petersburg, Russian Empire
- Resting place: Smolensky Cemetery, St. Petersburg
- Occupations: painter, lithographer, illustrator, portraitist

Pyotr Fyodorovich Borel (Russian: Пётр Фёдорович Борель, 1829 — October 1898) was a Russian painter and draughtsman, best known for his portrait illustrations.

An Imperial Academy of Arts alumnus, Borel became famous for his massive series of lithographic portraits, including The Lyceum of Prince Bezborodko (1859), the Gallery of Russian Statesmen (six volumes, 1860–1869), Portraits of Russian Priests (1860—1862) and, in particular, The Gallery of the Russian Heroes and Chief Commanders in the 1853-1856 Crimean War (1857—1863), the latter amounting to more than 400 portraits. Borel was an avid contributor to the magazines Khudozhestvenny Listok (Art Leaflet, 1868–1870), Vsemirnaya Illustratsiya (1871—1895) and Sever (North, 1889–1895). Also highly successful were his watercolour landscapes.
