= Karl Fischer (photographer) =

German-born Russian photographer (died after 1923)

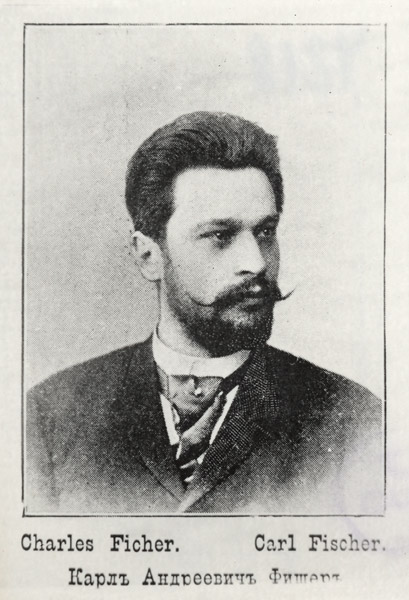
Fischer in 1896

Karl Andreyevich Fischer (Russian: Карл Андреевич Фишер; born Karl August Fischer; 1850/1859 – after 1923) was a German-born Russian photographer.

== Biography ==
There is conflicting evidence as to Fischer's early years. His date has birth has been given as 1850, or 1859. MuseumArt, while giving the date of birth as 1859, elsewhere suggests that it might have been 1847, and cites the imperial archives of Saratov Governorate, according to which he owned a photography salon in Saratov in as early as 1863–1868, the official permission having been granted ("...to Karl Fischer, the citizen of Saxe-Weimar-Eisenach") personally by the Governor Grigory Aksakov (the son of writer Sergey Aksakov). In 1877, he founded a photographic salon in Orenburg, and in mid-1880s moved to Moscow to buy there in 1887 a house which would later become the famous Fischer Atelier.

Fischer's vast artistic legacy includes series of portraits of Russian actors (among them Maria Ermolova, Ivan Moskvin, Vsevolod Meyerkhold), writers (Leo Tolstoy, Leonid Andreyev, Anton Chekhov) artists (Ilya Repin, Vasily Surikov, Mikhail Vrubel) and composers (Pyotr Tchaikovsky, Sergey Rakhmaninov). An official Imperial Theatres photographer in 1892–1915, he documented several major productions at the Alexandrinka, Maly Theatre and Moscow Art Theatre. In 1894, he became a co-founder of the Russian Photographic Society and served as its Chairman in 1898–1907.

The famous Fischer Atelier at the Kuznetsky Bridge (1895–1915) in Moscow specialized also in architectural and historical photography which featured regularly in the magazines like Niva and Vsemirnaya Illustratsiya. Fischer, who was closely associated with the Tretyakov Gallery, was the first in Russia to publish illustrated catalogues of paintings, among his best-known being the 25th anniversary of the Peredvizhniki group (1872–1897) and the Tretyakov Gallery Catalogue (both 1899). After the death of Leo Tolstoy in 1910, Fischer, responding to the request of the writer's widow, published several albums which collected practically every single photograph of Tolstoy made in his lifetime, and featured also portraits of his family members and many of his friends.

In 1915, at the height of the jingoistic anti-German campaign in Russia, Fischer (then still a citizen of Prussia) was stripped of his imperial honours. The Fischer Atelier was destroyed by the mob as a result of anti-German pogrom and never re-opened. That year he applied for Russian citizenship and apparently received it, but when exactly, remains uncertain. Fischer continued to work as a photographer in the Soviet Russia after 1917. It is known that in 1923 he handed all his photographs of Alexander Ostrovsky to Anna Golubkina, for her to use them in her work on the monument which years later would be placed by the Maly Theatre. Nothing has been heard of Karl Fischer ever since.
