= Dmitri Skobeltsyn =

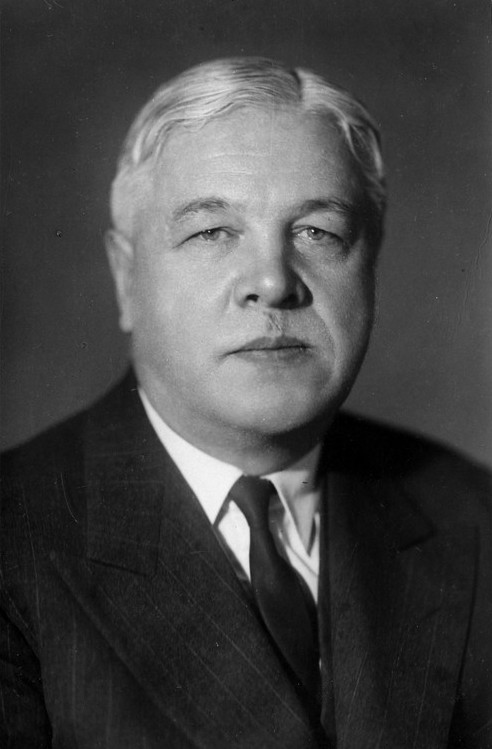
- Dmitri Skobeltsyn
- Born: 24 November 1892; Saint Petersburg
- Died: November 16, 1990 (aged 97); Moscow

Dmitri Vladimirovich Skobeltsyn (Russian: Дмитрий Владимирович Скобельцын; 24 November 1892, Saint Petersburg – 16 November 1990, Moscow) was a Soviet physicist, academician of the Academy of Sciences of the Soviet Union (1946), Hero of Socialist Labour (1969).

Starting in 1923, Skobeltsyn pioneered the use of the cloud chamber to study the Compton effect.

As a result of this work, Skobeltsyn paved the way for Carl David Anderson's discovery of the positron by two important contributions: by adding a magnetic field to his cloud chamber (in 1925), and by discovering charged particle cosmic rays, for which he is credited in Anderson's Nobel lecture.

== Awards and honors ==
- Two Orders of the Red Banner of Labour (1944, 1945)
- Six Orders of Lenin (1949, 1953, 1962, 1969, 1972, 1975)
- Stalin Prize, 1st class (1951)
- Hero of Socialist Labour (1969)
- Lenin Prize (1982)
- Order of the October Revolution (1982)
