= Konstantin Zel'in =

Soviet historian

- Born: 13 March 1892 (in Julian calendar); Moscow
- Died: 30 March 1983 (aged 91); Moscow
- Education: Doctor of Historical Sciences
- Alma mater: Faculty of History and Philology of Moscow University
- Occupation: Classical scholar
- Employer: Institute of History of the Soviet Academy of Sciences; MSU Faculty of History

Konstantin Konstantinovich Zel'in (Russian: Константин Константинович Зельин; 1892–1983) was a Soviet Russian historian of classical antiquity, Doctor of Sciences in Historical Sciences (1963).

== Biography ==
He graduated from the Moscow University in 1916. He studied under Professors Robert Wipper and Dmitry Petrushevsky.

From 1926 to 1929, he was a graduate student.

Then he taught at the Institute of Red Professors.

From 1934 he was a professor at the MSU Faculty of History. Zel'in headed the Department of History of the Ancient World.

His both dissertations are devoted to Egypt. He published in Journal of Ancient History.

Preceded by Vladimir Sergeyevich Sergeyev	Head of the Department of History of the Ancient World, MSU Faculty of History; 1942	Succeeded by Nikolai Mashkin
