= Yuri Terapiano =

Russian poet, writer, translator, literary critic

- Born: 21 October 1892; Kerch, Russian Empire (now Russia or Ukraine) (Note: Kerch and the rest of Crimea are currently a matter of international dispute between Russia and Ukraine. See Annexation of Crimea by the Russian Federation for clarification)
- Died: 3 July 1980 (aged 87); Gagny, France
- Writing career
- Genres: poetry fiction literary criticism

Yuri Konstantinovich Terapiano (Russian: Ю́рий Константи́нович Терапиа́но; 21 [o.s. 9] October 1892 – 3 July 1980) was a Russian poet, writer, translator, literary critic and a prominent figure in White émigré cultural life.

== Biography ==
Yuri Terapiano graduated from the Alexandrovskaya Classical High School in 1911, and then from the Saint Vladimir University Law School in Kiev in 1916. Afterwards, he was drafted into the Imperial Russian Army to fight on the Southeastern front during World War I. In 1919 he joined the Volunteer Army.

His early works were published in various Kiev literary journals. In 1924, after his emigration to France, he organized and chaired the Union of Young Poets and Prose Writers in Paris. In 1955 he became the head of the literary criticism section of the Paris magazine Russian Thought (Русская Мысль). Terapiano published six books of poetry but became known mostly for his collection of memoirs and articles Meetings (Встречи, 1953), and the Russian émigré anthology The Muse of Diaspora (Муза диаспоры, 1960). He also published a novella Voyage to an Unknown Country: Eastern Legends (Paris - 1946).

== Literary work ==
Terapiano's poetry shows the influence of the Acmeist school, though formally he wasn't a member of the circle. He aspired toward "simplicity in his artistic method, self-awareness, moderation and purity of expression, and an intense search for God," according to critic Konstantin Mochulsky. Terapiano's subjects included Russia, The Crimea, the Russian Civil War, his own war experiences, daily émigré life in Paris, and his exploration of religious issues and questions.

== English translations ==
- Poems, from A Russian Cultural Revival, University of Tennessee Press, 1981. ISBN 0-87049-296-9
