= Viktor Klyushnikov =

Russian writer, editor and journalist (1841–1892)

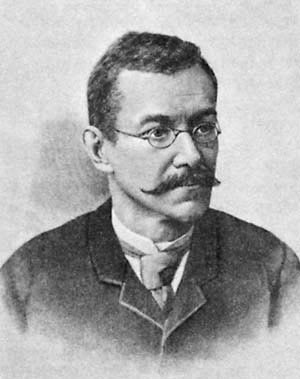
- Born: Клюшников Виктор Петрович; 22 March 1841; Gzhatsky Uyezd, Smolensk Governorate, Imperial Russia
- Died: 19 November 1892 (aged 51); Saint Petersburg, Imperial Russia
- Education: Imperial Moscow University (1860)
- Occupations: writer, editor, journalist

Viktor Petrovich Klyushnikov (Russian: Клю́шников Ви́ктор Петро́вич, 22 March 1841 – 19 November 1892) was a Russian writer, editor and journalist, whose debut novel, Marevo (Марево, Haze, Russky Vestnik, 1864), was considered by contemporary Russian critics to be one of the four 'great anti-nihilist' novels of the time, alongside Troubled Seas by Alexey Pisemsky, No Way Out by Nikolai Leskov and Demons by Fyodor Dostoyevsky. Both Ivan Turgenev and Alexey K. Tolstoy reacted positively, hailing the arrival of the original, even if erratic literary talent, "who [was playing] with his gift in acrobatic fashion," according to Tolstoy.

None of Klyushnikov's later works, among them Bolshiye korabli (Большие корабли, Big Ships, 1866), Tsygane (Цыгане, Gypsies, 1869), Drugaya zhizn (Другая жизнь, Another Life, 1865), Pri Petre (При Петре, In the Times of Peter the Great, 1872, co-authored by Vasily Kelsiyev), Semya volnodumtsev (Семья вольнодумцев, Free-Thinkers' Family, 1872, co-authored by Pyotr Petrov), Gosudar-otrok (Государь-отрок, The Young Tsar, 1880), have come even close to repeating the success of his debut.

According to the modern literary historian O. Mayorova, Klyushnikov was continuously dogged by financial troubles which might have accounted for the fact that most of his novels and novelets, bear the mark of utter haste, boasting stilted characters and improbable twists of plots. The critic lauded, though, his fine, lively language and occasionally brilliant observations of real life. In retrospect, she argued, Klyushnikov's major achievement was his work (in 1870–1876, then 1887–1892) as the editor-in-chief of the popular and influential Niva magazine, to which he devoted himself totally. He also published his own Krugozor magazine (1876–1878) which proved to be a financial disaster, and edited the Encyclopedic Dictionary of Science between 1877 and 1886.
