= Nikolai Karonin-Petropavlovsky =

Karonin-Petropavlovsky
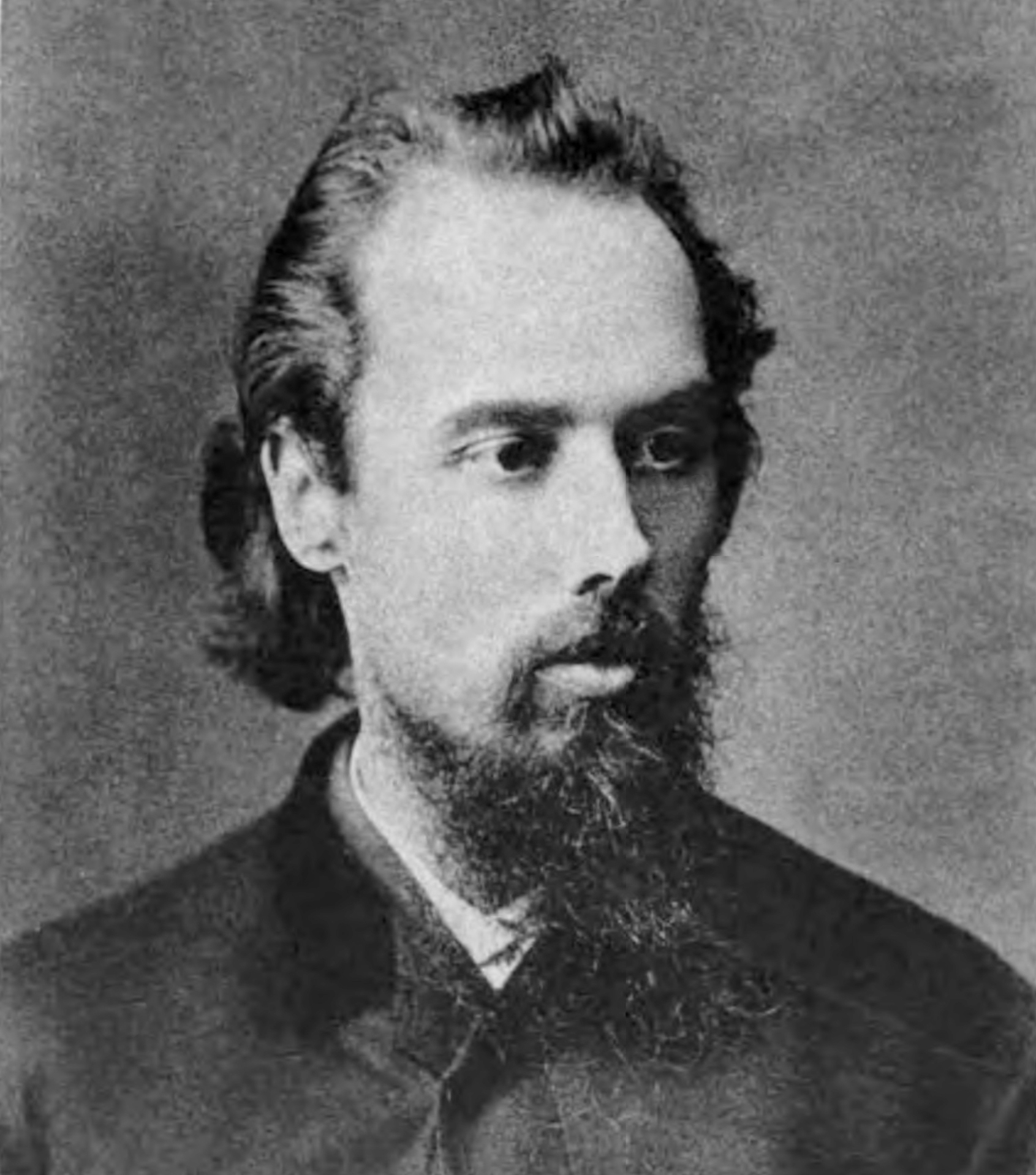
- Born: October 17, 1853; Voznesenka, Buzuluksky Uyezd, Samara Governorate, Russian Empire
- Died: May 24, 1892 (aged 38); Saratov, Russian Empire
- Writing career
- Genres: short fiction, essay
- Notable works: The Mute; First Storm; Perpetuum Mobile

Nikolai Elpidiforovich Karonin-Petropavlovsky (Russian: Николай Елпидифорович Каронин-Петропавловский; October 17, 1853 – May 24, 1892) was a Russian writer, essayist, and political activist. His real name was Nikolai Petropavlovsky; his pen name was S. Karonin. A number of later Russian sources refer to him as Nikolay Karonin-Petropavlovsky.

== Biography ==
Nikolai Petropavlovsky was born in Samara Governorate, where his father was a village priest. His father provided him with his primary education. He then studied at a seminary, and afterward at a classical school. In May 1874 he met the revolutionary populist Porphyry Voinaralsky, and helped him to create and organize an underground circle of self-education. This soon led to his expulsion from school.

He was arrested in Summer of 1874 for "participating in illegal activity, with the intention of overthrowing the government". In December he was transferred to the Peter and Paul Fortress in Saint Petersburg. He spent three and a half years in confinement in Saint Petersburg, which had a negative effect on his health. In 1877 he was acquitted of his charges and released. He spent 1877-78 conducting revolutionary activities, and in February 1879 he was arrested for a second time. At the end of 1879, while in detention, he began writing, his first work being an essay entitled The Mute, which attacked wealthy populists and the way the autocracy dealt with the problems of the poor.

In 1881 he was exiled to Siberia for a term of 5 years. In Siberia he lived in Tobolsk province (present-day Tyumen Oblast), and engaged in economic research in its southern districts, for which he received an award from the West Siberian Division of the Russian Geographical Society. After he returned from exile, he lived first in Kazan, then in Nizhni Novgorod, before settling in Saratov, where he wrote for the local newspapers, and contributed stories to the magazines Russian Thought, and the Russian Gazette. He had planned to write an epic novel, but was unable to begin work on it before his death in 1892.

In an article on Karonin-Petropavlovsky, Maxim Gorky wrote:

"That man was amazingly pure... I don't think he noticed how he lived, since he was completely preoccupied with his search for truth and justice."

== Writing ==
He published his first work, an essay The Mute (1879) in Otechestvennye Zapiski (Annals of the Fatherland). After this he published stories in Notes of the Fatherland and the magazine Russian Word. In his first stories, he drew a vivid picture of the village, with its desperate financial need, powerlessness and helplessness. Against a background of general savagery he revealed the intimate life of the peasant. The majority of his works deal with the issues of the peasants, and with lower-class intellectuals, whose purpose he felt it was to devote themselves to the people.

== English translations ==
- Perpetuum Mobile (perpetual motion), and First Storm, (short stories), from The Salt Pit, Raduga Publishers, 1988.
