= Boris Lavrentiev =

Russian histologist

Boris Innokentyevich Lavrentiev (Russian: Борис Иннокентьевич Лаврентьев; 12 August, 1892 – 9 February, 1944) was a Russian and Soviet histologist who served as a professor at the Zoological Institute of Moscow and at the First Moscow State Medical University. His major work was on the peripheral nervous system, regeneration and innervation of internal organs. His mother raised him alone. She was fluent in French and German, and had a special music and artist education (played the piano, sang and drew).

Lavrentiev was born in Kazan where, raised by his mother Vera Vasilievna née Varaksina alone, he went to school (1901-1908) before entering Kazan University. He became interested in biology after attending the classes of I. P. Zabusov. He then joined the medical school where he trained under K. A. Arnstein, A. I. Timofeev, and A. N. Mislavsky. His earliest studies were on the innervation of the female urethra and was published in German. During World War I he served on the front dealing with the treatment of soldiers. After demobilization in 1921 he joined the department of histology at Kazan University. He worked under A. N. Mislavsky and A. F. Samoilov. In 1925 he went to the University of Utrecht under Jan Boeke to work on neurohistology. In 1927 he joined the veterinary faculty at Moscow and in 1929 joined the First Moscow State Medical University. He became a member of the Academy of Sciences of the Soviet Union in 1939.

Lavrentiev specialized in neurohistology and examined growth and repair in nerves using silver impregnation techniques. He supported the idea of trophic effects and suggested that synapses helped in independence of the neurons. He classified interoceptors, the endings of nerves in internal organs, based on morphology.
