= Konstantin Sluchevsky =

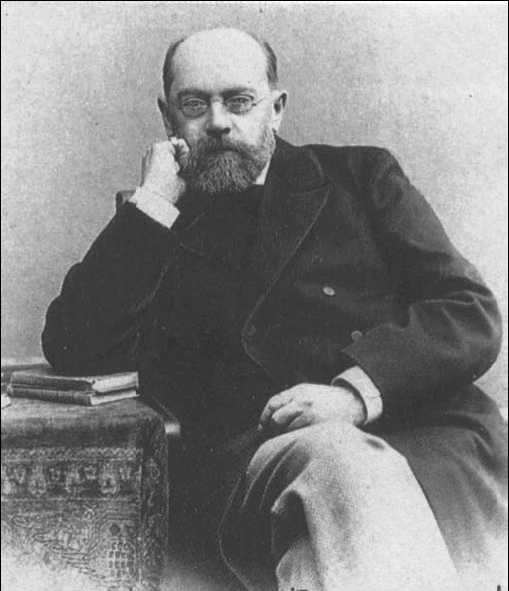
- Native name: Константин Константинович Случевский
- Born: Konstantin Konstantinovich Sluchevsky; July 29, 1837 St. Peterburg
- Died: September 25, 1904 (aged 67)
- Occupation: Poet

Konstantin Konstantinovich Sluchevsky (Russian: Константин Константинович Случевский), (July 29, 1837–September 25, 1904) was a Russian poet.

Sluchevsky was born in St. Peterburg into a Russian noble family. He graduated from the First Cadet Corps, served in the Imperial Russian Guard, then entered the Academy of the General Staff, but in 1861 he quit the military service and went abroad. For a number of years he studied in Paris, Berlin, and Heidelberg, where he got the degree of Doctor of Philosophy in 1865. On his return to Russia he worked for the Ministry of Internal Affairs and State Property. From 1891 to 1902 he was the Chief Editor of the journal Pravitelstvenny Vestnik (Government Bulletin). He was also a member of the Council of the Chief Printing Office and had a title of Hofmeister.
