= Ekaterina Beketova =

Russian poet, writer and translator

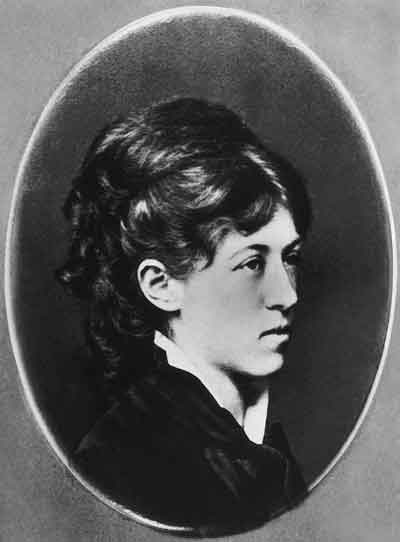
Ekaterina Beketova in 1880

Ekaterina Andreyevna Krasnova (née Beketova; Russian: Екатери́на Андре́евна Красно́ва, Бекето́ва; 29 August [O.S. 17 August] 1855 – 16 May [O.S. 4 May] 1892) was a Russian poet, writer, and translator. She was born in Moscow into a family of Russian nobility, the daughter of botanist Andrey Beketov. She also wrote children's literature and invested much attention on her nephew Alexander Blok. In 1892, she died of eclampsia following a medically mandated abortion.
