= Mikhail Kroshitsky Sevastopol Art Museum =

Art museum in Sevastopol, Crimea

Coordinates: 44.61368°N 33.52236°E

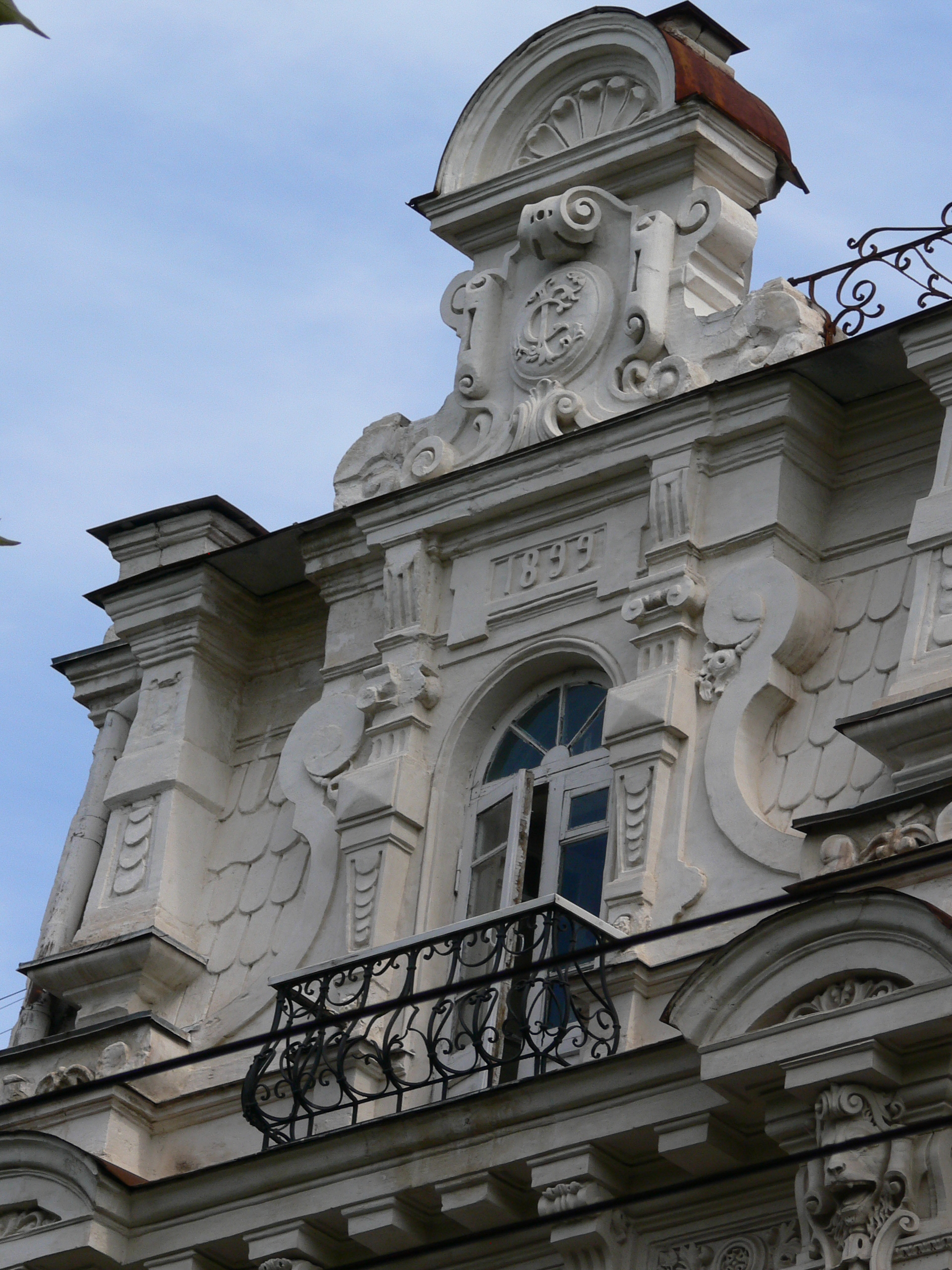
- Established: November 1927; 97 years ago
- Location: Nakhimova Avenue, 9; Address during renovations: General Ostryakov Avenue, 70; Sevastopol, Crimea
- Type: Art museum
- Director: www.sevartmuseum.info

The M.Kroshitsky Sevastopol Art Museum (Ukrainian: Севастопольський художній музей імені М.П.Крошицького, romanized: Sevastopolskyi khudozhnii muzei imeni M.P.Kroshytskoho) is an art museum located in the Crimean city of Sevastopol.

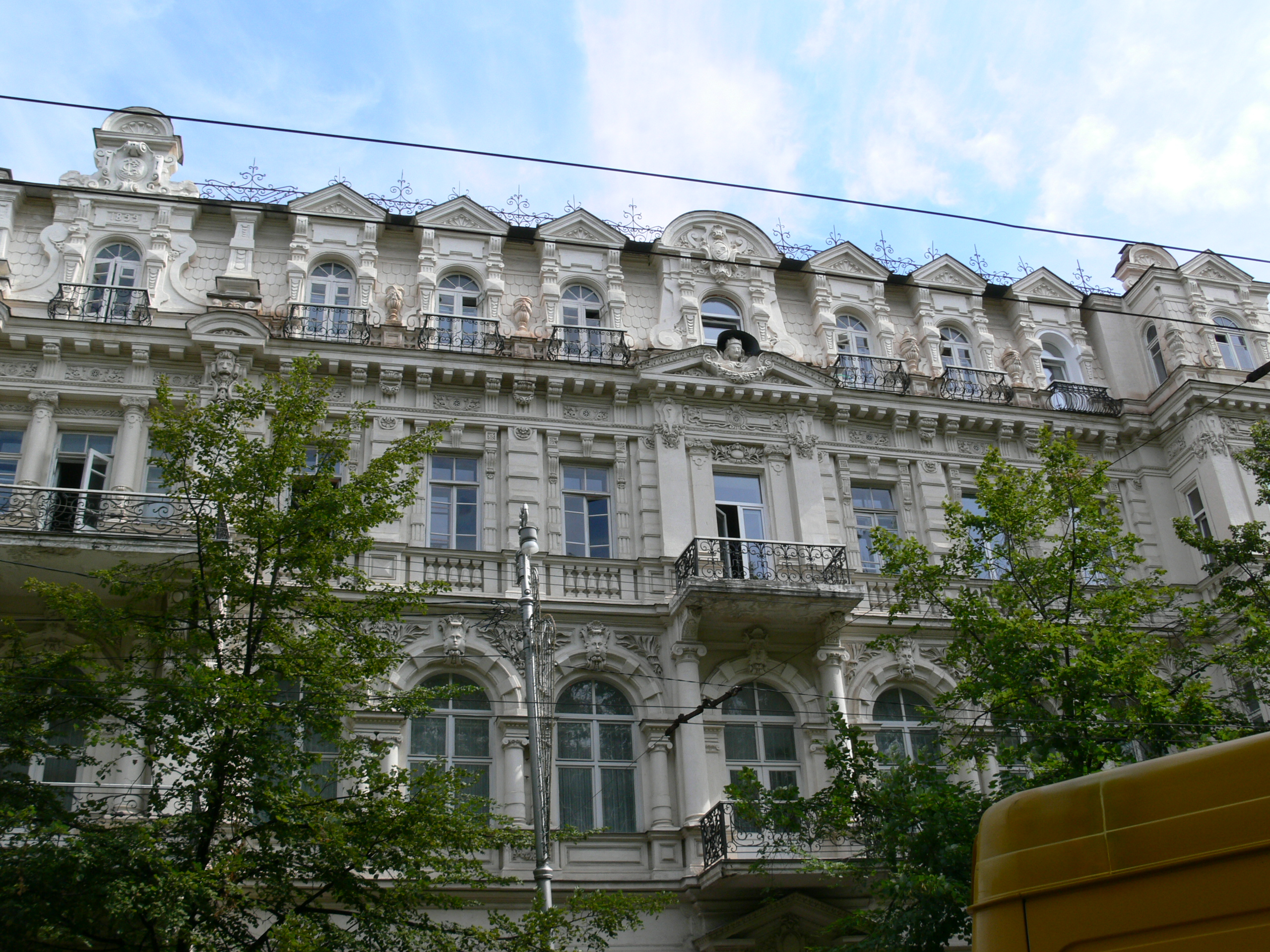
The Mikhail Kroshitsky Sevastopol Art Museum, 9 Nakhimova Prospect, Sevastopol

The museum is located in the centre of the city, in a "remarkable" four-story mansion with a "magnificently decorated facade," built in the late 19th century by the "personal honorary citizen of Sevastopol" merchant Semyon Gavalov. After the formation of the Crimean Autonomous Soviet Socialist Republic in 1921, the museum was opened in November 1927 “for the broadest masses of the people.” It was renamed in 1991, in honour of Mikhail Kroshitsky, museum director from 1939 to 1958. Its collection is organized into three departments: Western European Art, Art of the Russian Empire of the 18th - early 20th centuries, and Soviet, or more specifically Crimean, Art of the 20th century.

== The collection ==
=== Development ===
==== Foundation ====
The museum was founded during Crimea's brief period of autonomous rule (1921–1945) following the Russian Revolution (1917) and Civil War. The original collection was composed largely of artworks seized from the summer imperial residence of the Russian Tsar in the Livadia Palace, as well as from the aristocratic estates that lined the southern shores of Crimea. These works were later supplemented from the collections of the State Museum Fund and museums in Moscow and Leningrad.

==== The war years: WWII ====
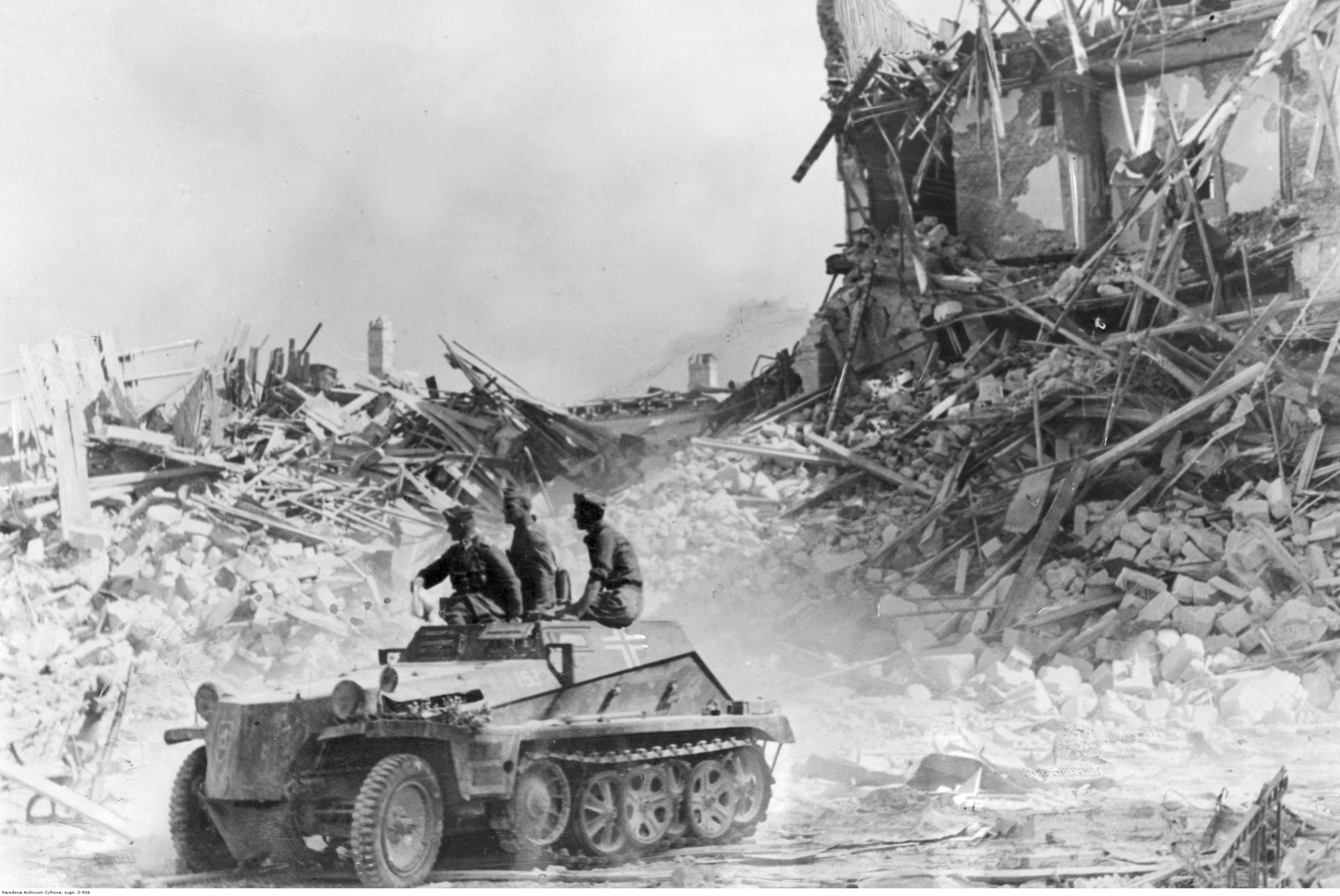
German troops enter Sevastopol, 1942

The Crimea was an area of intense conflict during World War II. A number of museum collections in Crimea were destroyed during this time, including the Simferopol Art Museum in Crimea's capital city, where almost the entire collection went up in flames.

Following the Siege of Sevastopol, and an intense period of bombardment, the Nazi Germans successfully overran the city, leaving only 11 buildings undamaged. The beautiful Gavalov mansion did not survive unscathed, but its collection, in an act of quixotic wartime heroism, was saved, owing to the efforts of its then director, Mikhael Kroshitsky.

Under Kroshitsky's directions, over one thousand artworks of the museum's most important works were evacuated to safekeeping in Tomsk, Siberia, an almost 3000 mile (~4800k) journey. Following the war, Kroshitsky worked tirelessly to rebuild both the collection and the Gavalov mansion, which was reopened in the spring of 1958.

==== Collapse of the USSR ====
In 1991, following the collapse of the Soviet Union and Ukraine's emergence as an independent state, Kroshitsky's efforts in this area were recognized with the museum's re-dedication in his name. "In the autumn of 1991, on November 27, the Cabinet of Ministers of Ukraine adopted a resolution agreeing: <<To accept the proposal of the Sevastopol City Executive Committee to name Sevastopol Art Museum, MP Kroshitsky Sevastopol Art Museum, for the Honored Artist of the USSR Kroshitsky, MP.>>" In 2012, the museum for the first time joined the European Night of Museums.

=== The collection today ===
Today, the museum's collection comprises more than ten thousand works of art, including paintings, drawings, sculptures, graphic and printed media works. The permanent collection displays original masterpieces from the Renaissance and Dutch Golden Age periods as well as paintings by French and German masters and famous Russian artists from the 16th to the 21st centuries. The museum offers new and rotating exhibitions on monthly basis. As of 2022, the Gavalov Mansion is under renovation and interior modernization, and the collection is housed on a temporary basis in space at 70 General Ostryakov Avenue.

==== Western European art ====
This represents the earliest part of the museum collection, housing works from the estates of Prince Leo Golitsyn, Prince Alexander Baryatinsky, Prince A.N. Witmer, and P.A. Demidov (the last owner of Vishnevetsky Castle). It includes Dutch and Flemish masters of the seventeenth century, works of the Italian Renaissance, French artists of the 18th-19th centuries, Meissen porcelain and Western European bronzes.

==== Imperial Russian art, 18th and 19th centuries ====
Also substantially a part of the museum's earliest collection, these works convey a sense of Russian Imperial culture at the time when the Tsar and his court would retire to Crimea for the winter months. Several types of work are included:

- Landscapes: including works by Ivan Aivazovsky, Arkip Kuindzhi, Isaac Levitan, Ivan Shishkin, Fyodor Vasilyev, Vasily Polenov, Serhii Vasylkivsky, Ivan Pokhitonov, Konstantin. Korovin, Igor Grabar, Konstantin Bogaevsky
- Portraits: Vasily Tropinin, Ivan Nikolaevich Kramskoy, Ilya Repin
- Genre paintings by Vladimir Makovsky, Nikolay Kasatkin, Vasily Vereshchagin.
M. Kroshitsky Sevastopol Art Museum: Permanent Collection Overview, Western European Art & Art of Imperial Russia

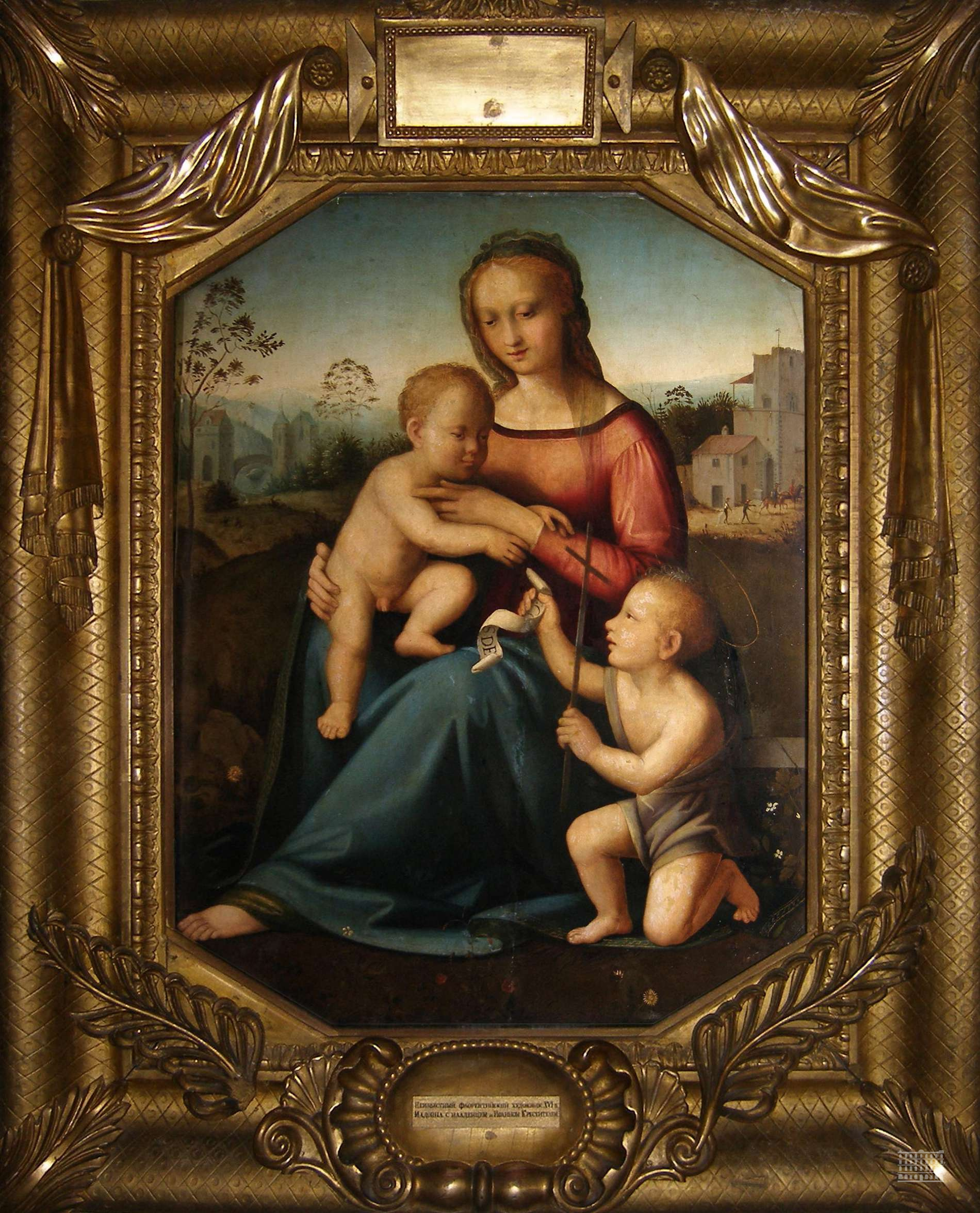
Italian School, Madonna with Jesus and St. John (16th c)

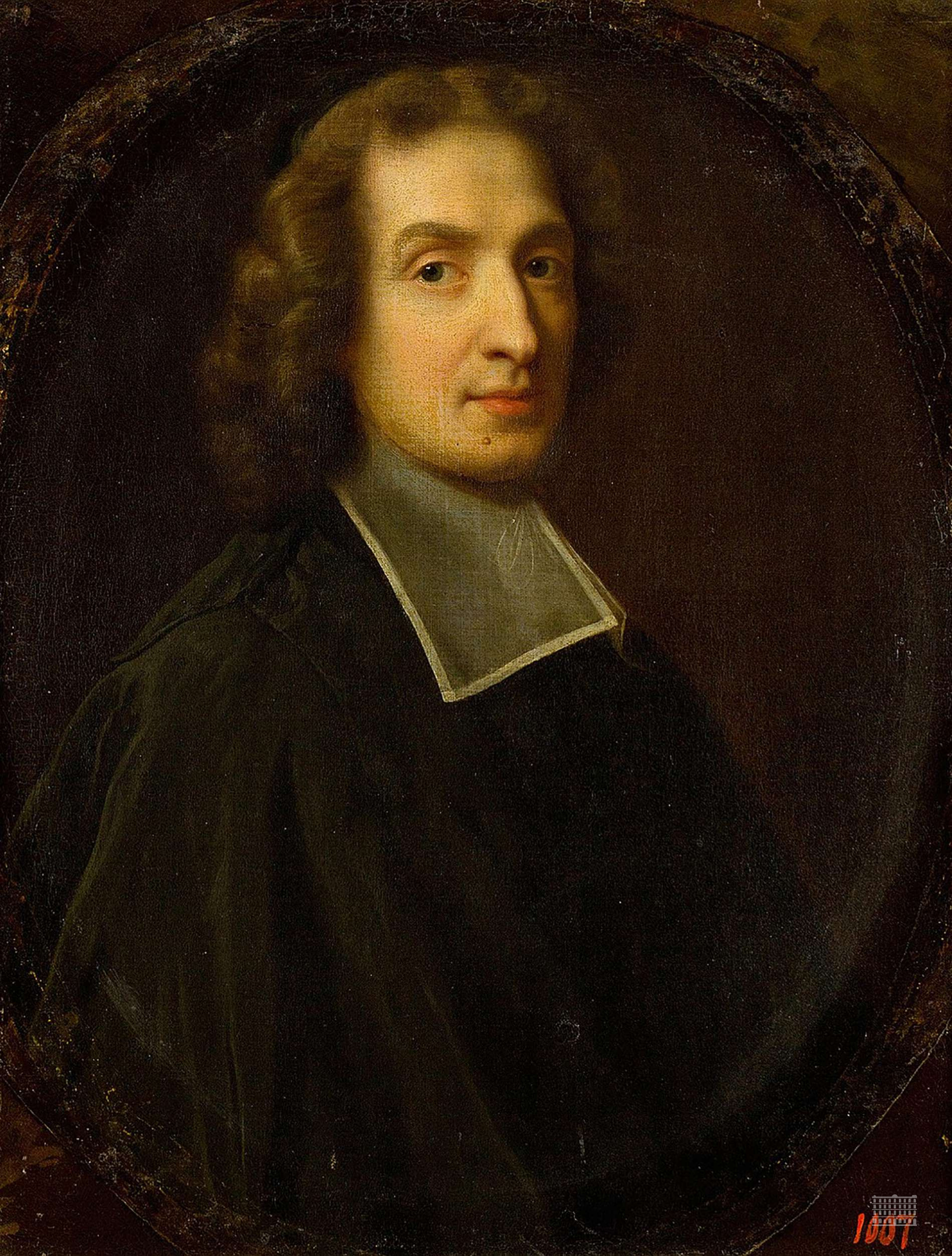
French School, Portrait of Fenelon (17th c)

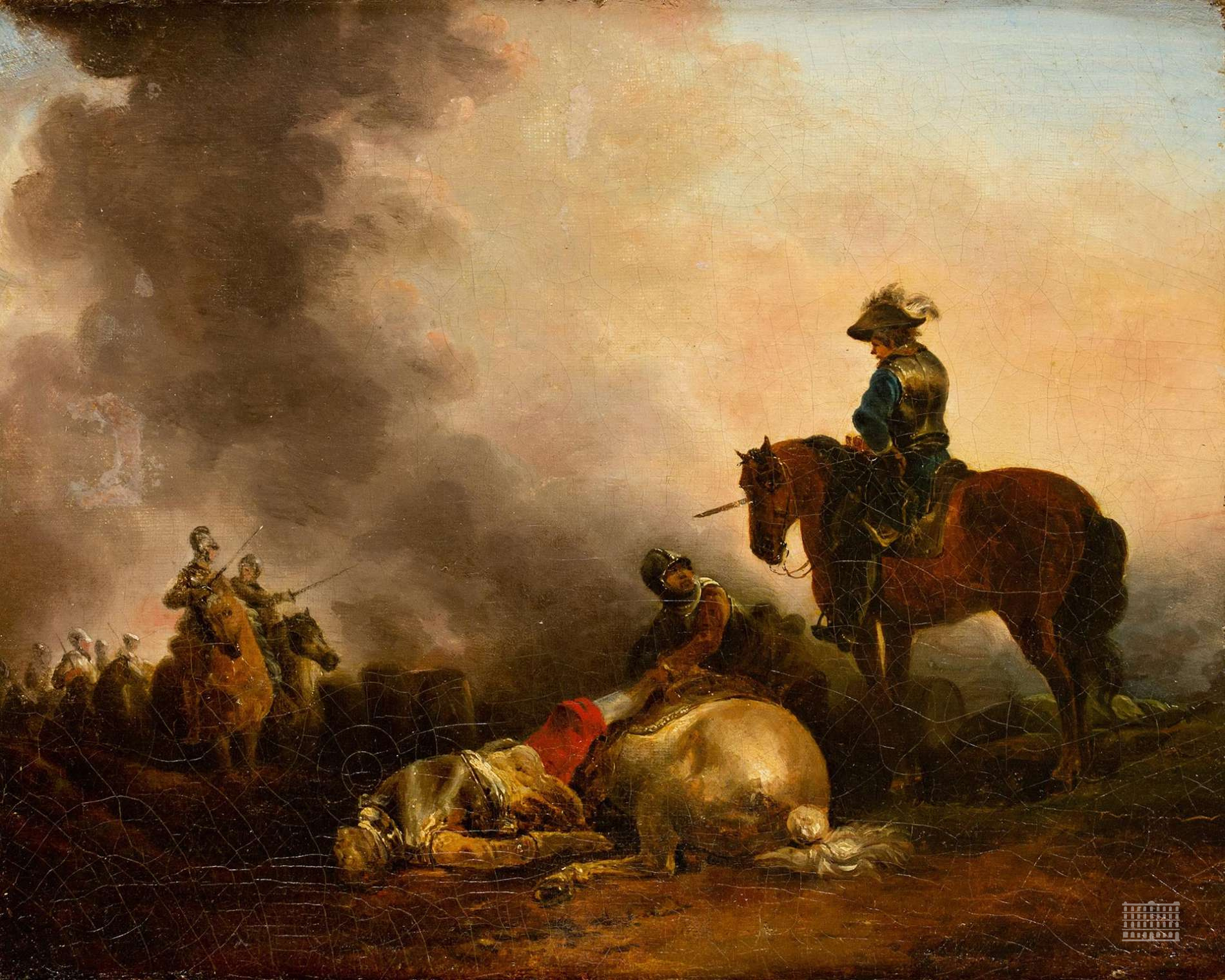
Casanova, Francesco, After the Battle (18th c)

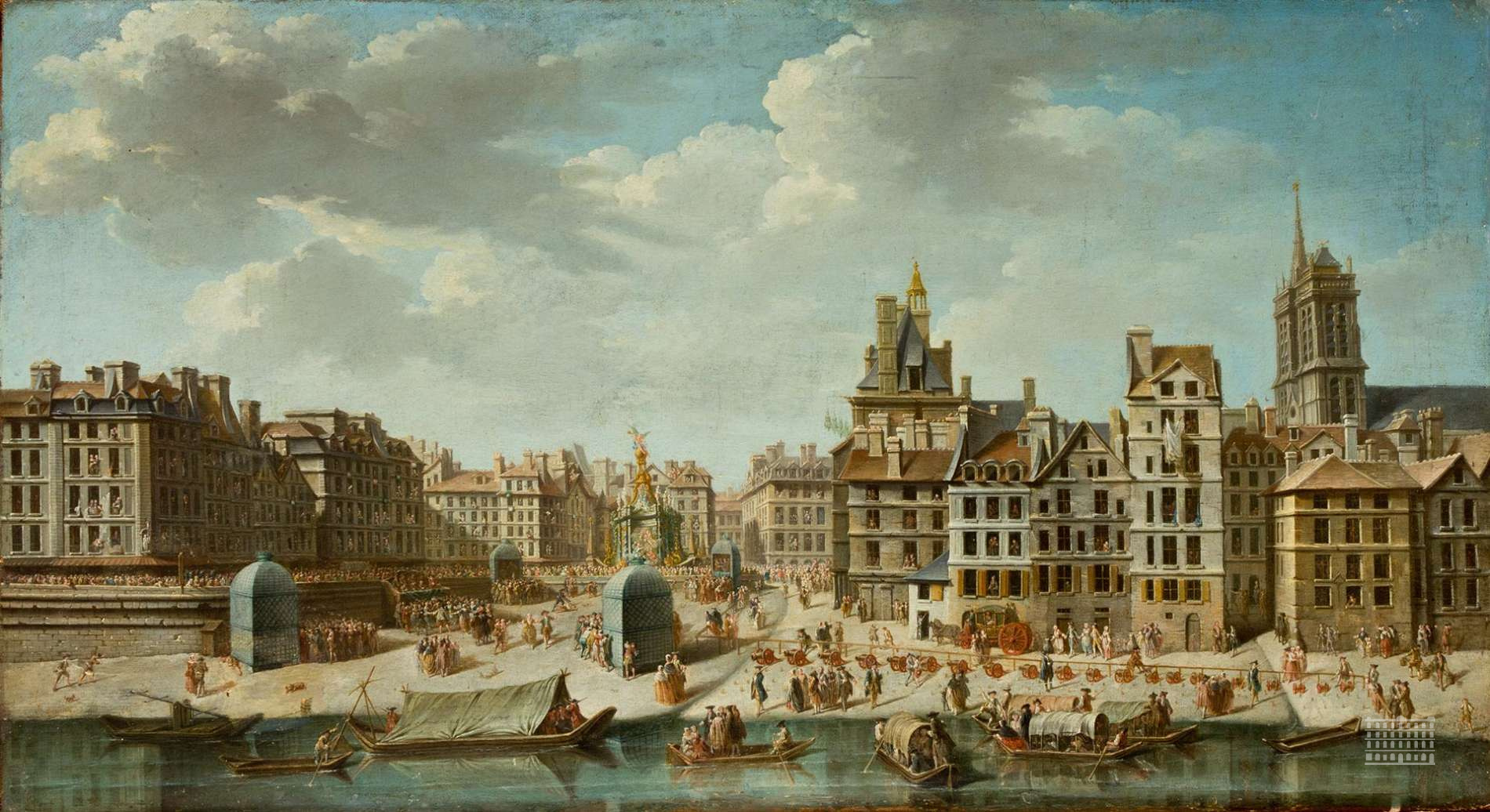
Ragena, Nicolas-Jean-Baptiste, Greve Square (1746)

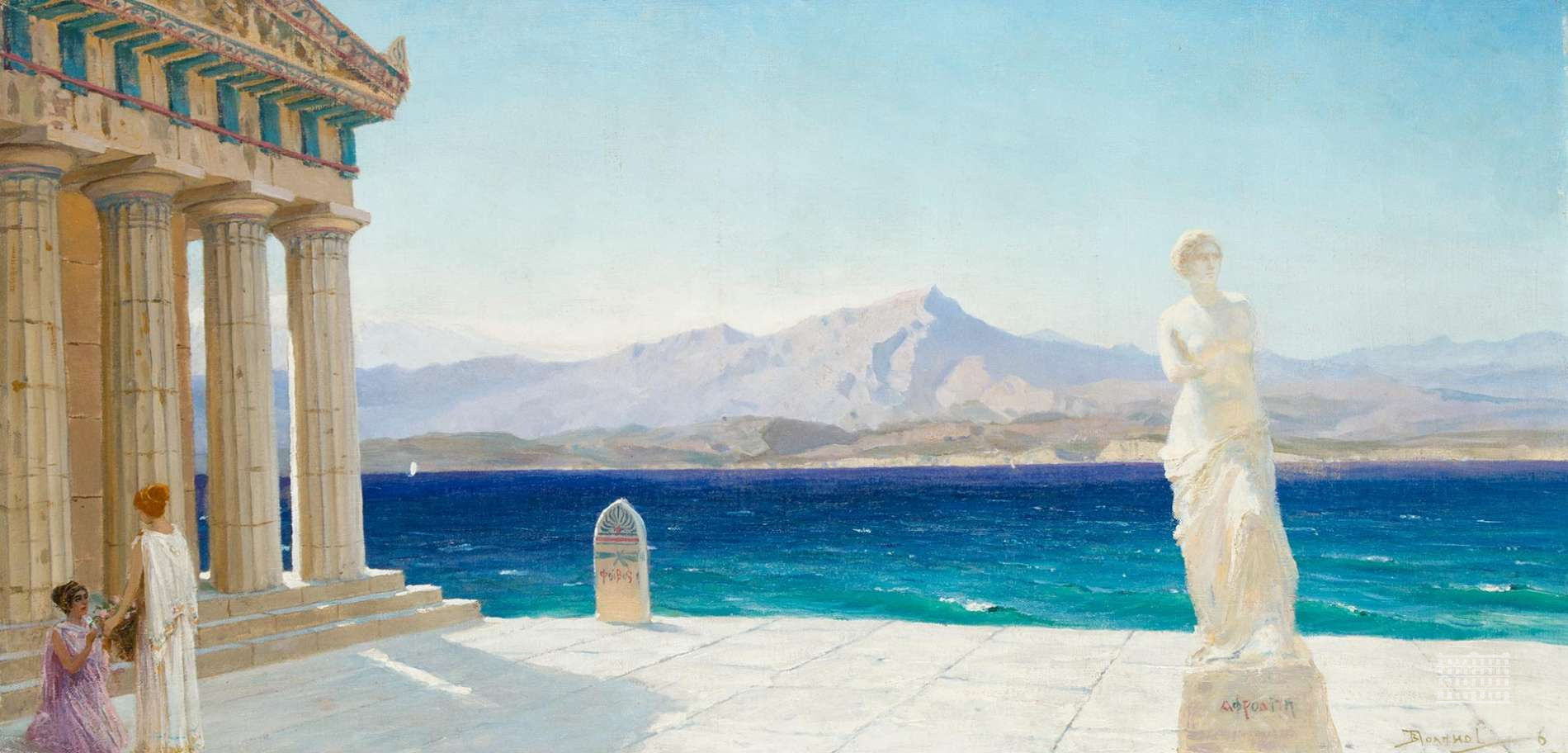
Polenov, Vasily Dmitrievich, Ancient Landscape (1906)

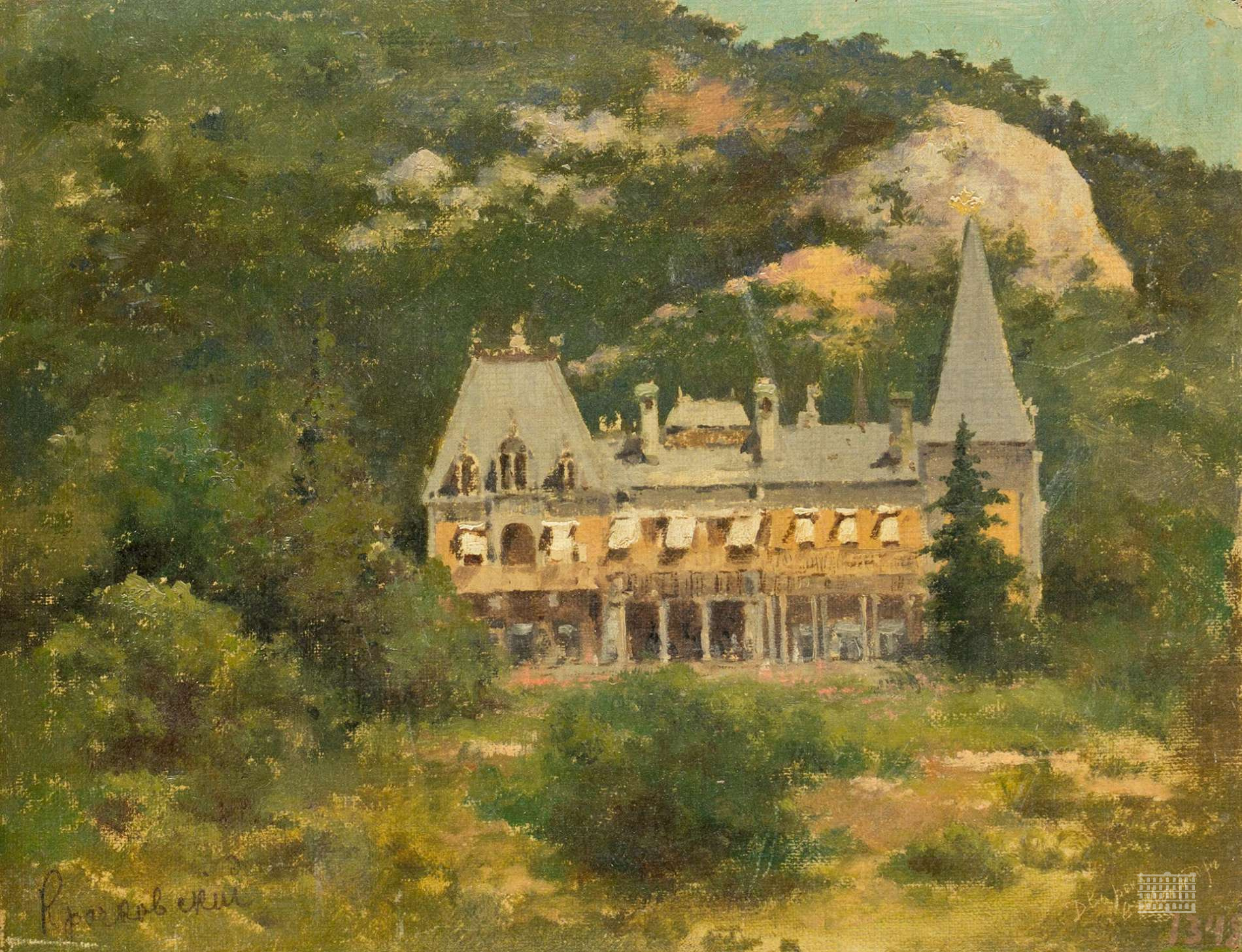
Krachkovsky, Josif Evstafievich, Massandra Palace (~1900)

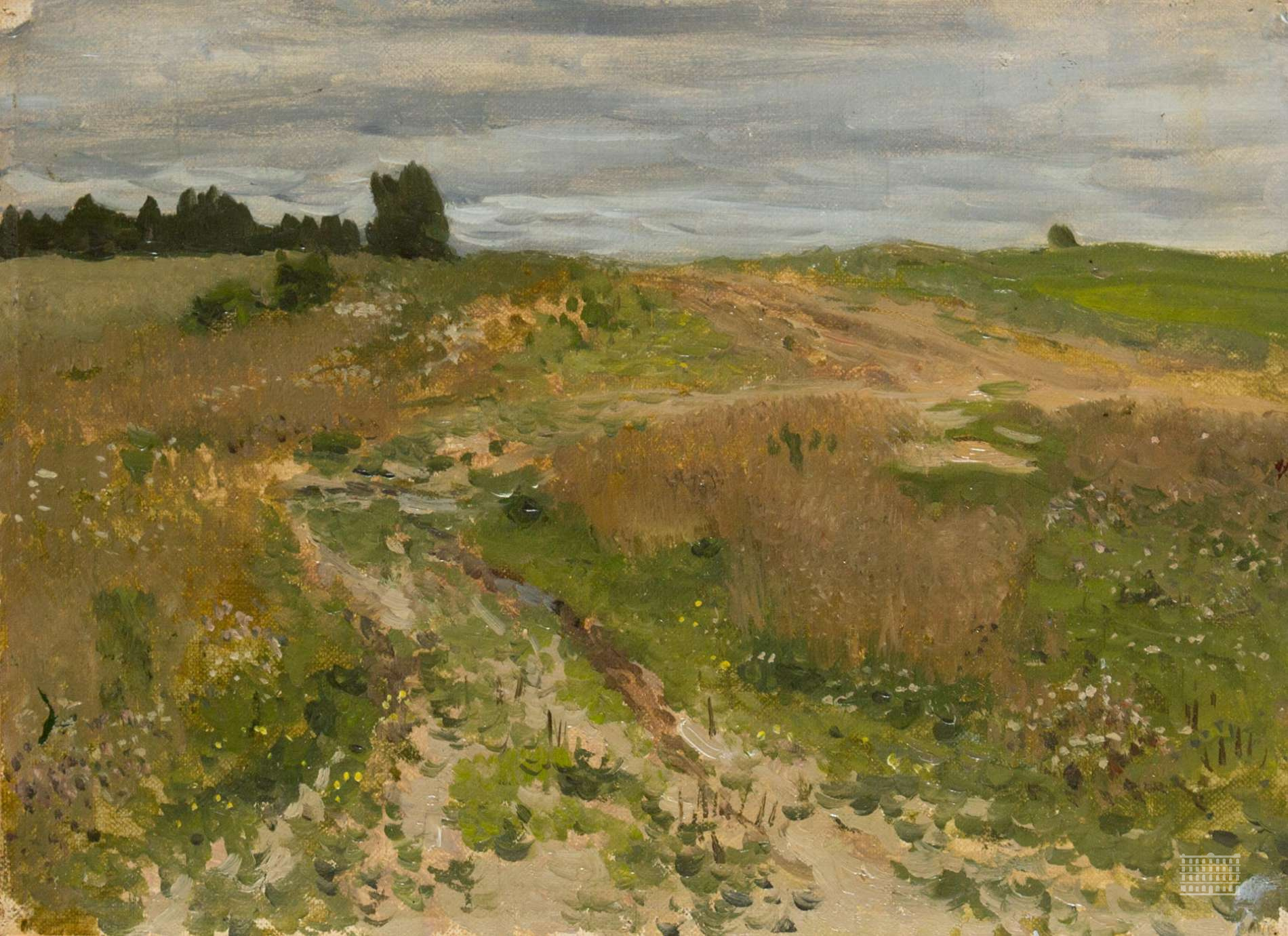
Isaac Levitan, Motley Field (1890s)

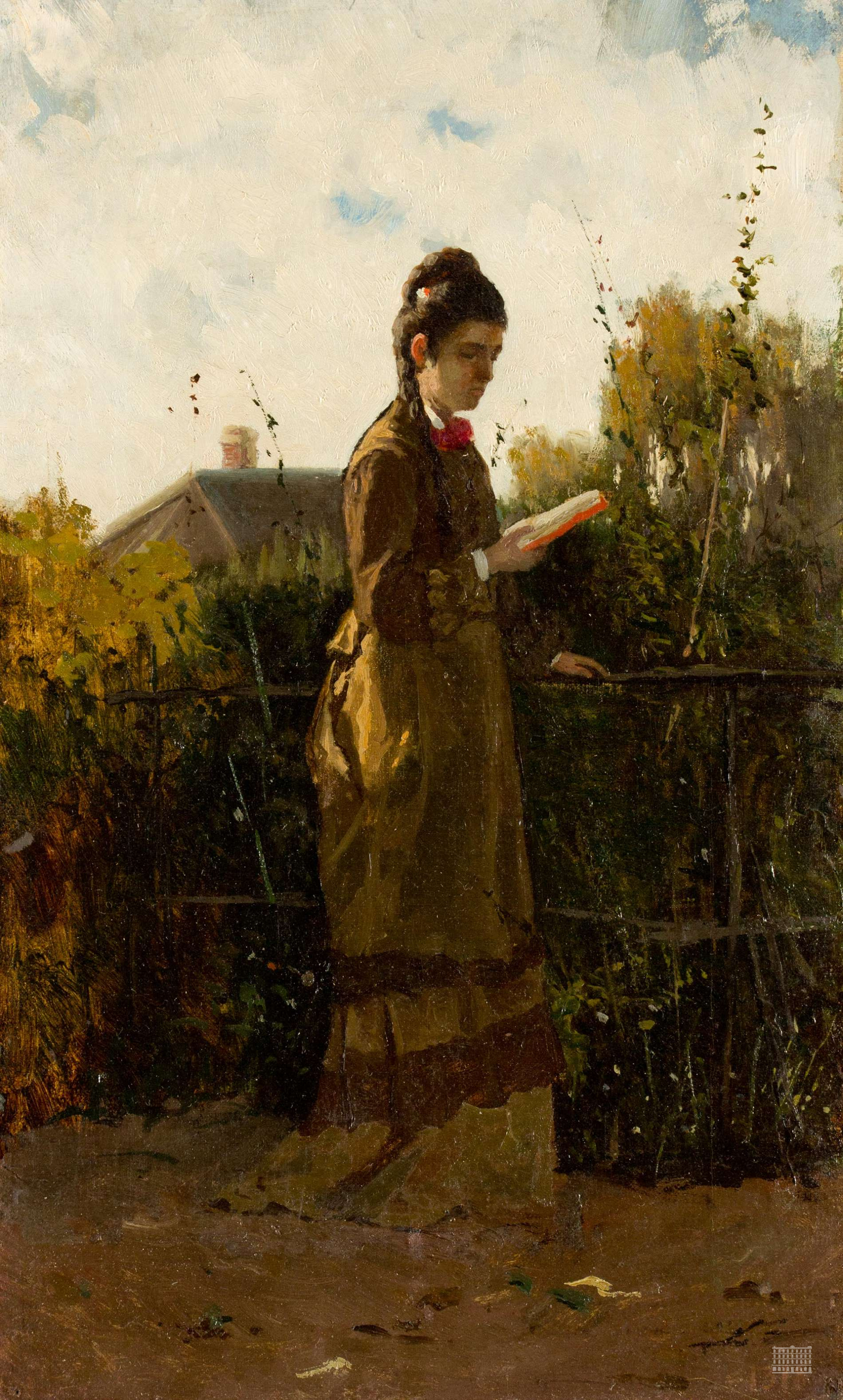
Kramskoy, Ivan Nikolaevich (1882) Lady with a Book

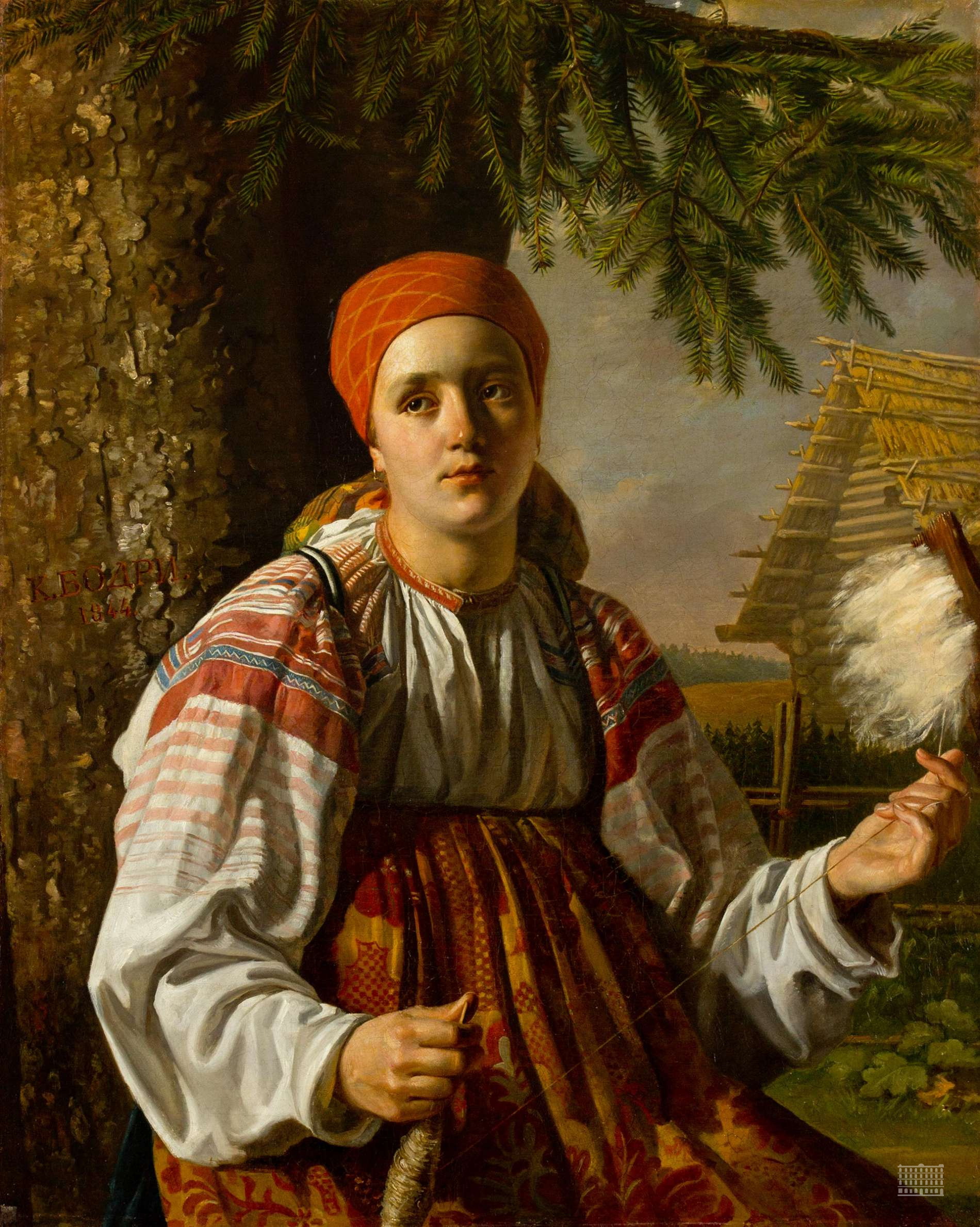
Baudry, Karl-Friedrich Petrovich, Spinner (1844)

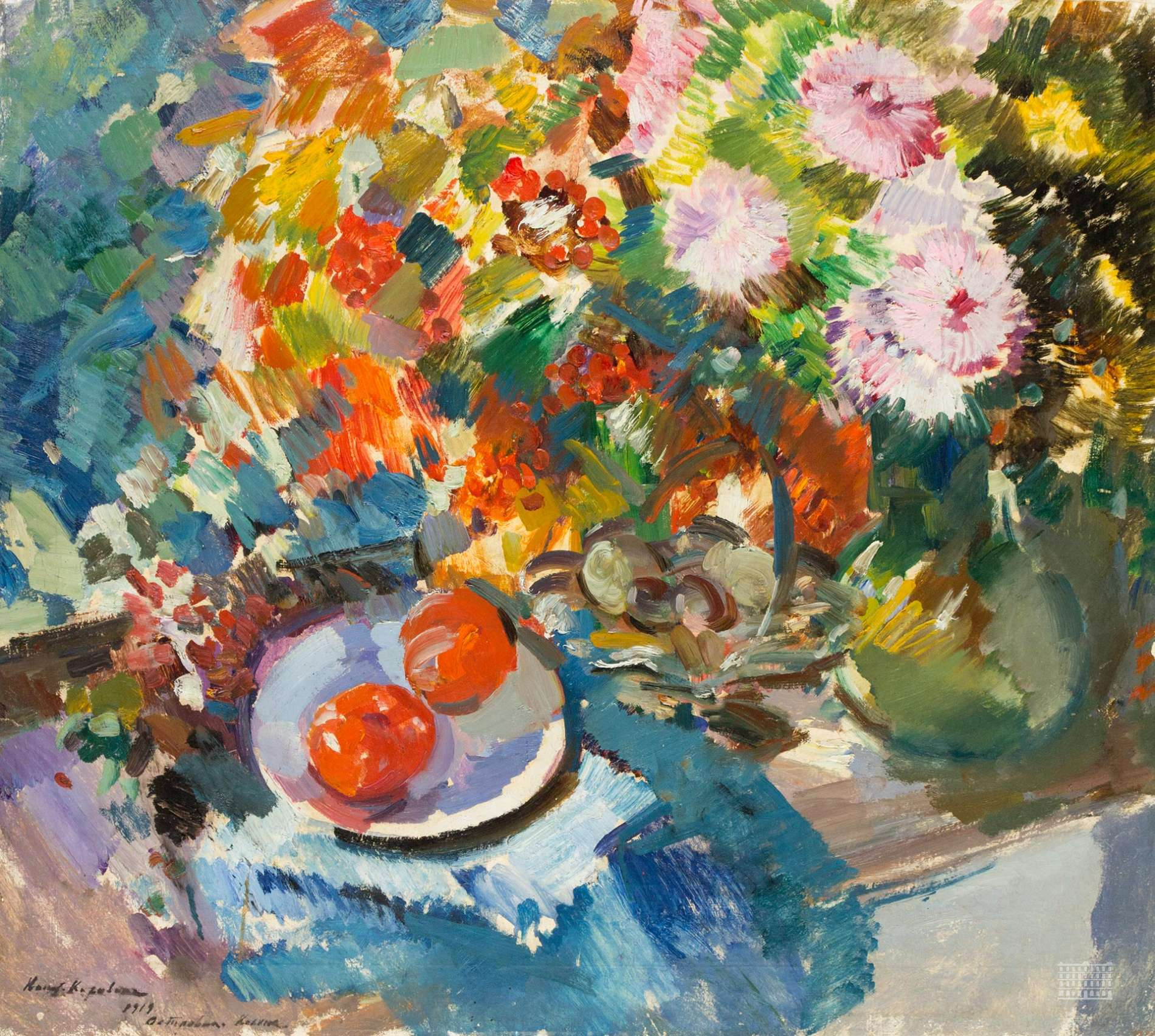
Korovin, Konstantin Alekseevich, Asters and Tomatoes (1919)

==== 20th century Soviet art and Crimean artists ====
Works of painting, graphics, sculpture and arts and crafts of the 20th and 21st centuries make up two-thirds of the collections of the Sevastopol Art Museum.

These works include pieces by the Russian artists: Aleksander V. Kuprin, Pyotr Konchalovsky, Kuzma Petrov-Vodkin, I. E. Grabar, K. F. Yuon, I. I. Brodsky, A. A. Deineka, G. G. Nissky, E. S. Zernova, along with the works of Ukrainian painters: T. N. Yablonska, A. M. Kashshay, N P. Hlushchenko and others.

The collection here is most notable for its inclusion of works by Crimean artists, and particularly local artists from Sevastopol, of the 20th, and now 21st centuries.
