= Stepan Mamchich =

Soviet Crimean and Ukrainian painter

- Степан Мамчич
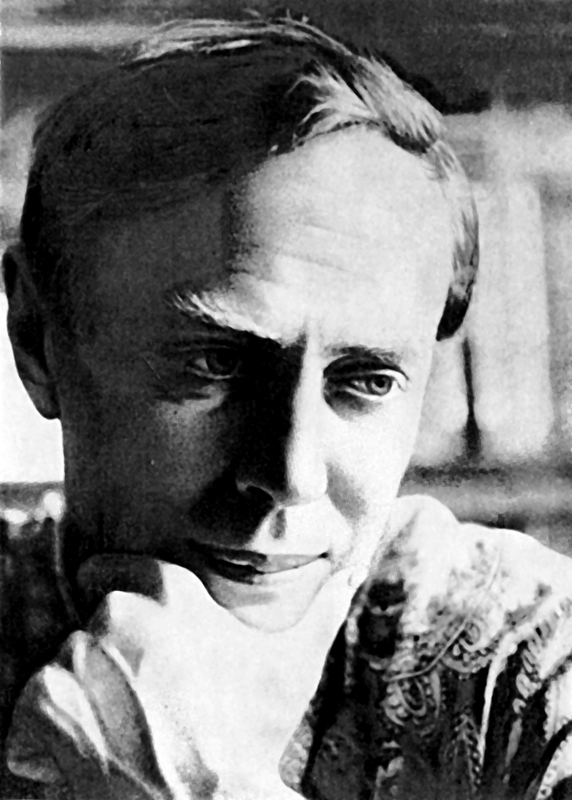
- Mamchich in 1973
- Born: Степан Гаврилович Мамчич; Stepan Havrylovych Mamchich; 14 August 1924; Novopokrovka, Crimean ASSR, Russian SFSR, USSR
- Died: 3 April 1974 (aged 49); Simferopol, Crimean Oblast, Ukrainian SSR, USSR
- Citizenship: Soviet Union
- Education: Crimean Art College named after M. S. Samokysh, 1951
- Movement: Cimmerian Art School; Romantic realism
- Spouse: Vera Demushkina (m. 1951)
- Website: stepan.mamchich.info

Stepan Mamchich (Russian: Степан Мамчич; Ukrainian: Степан Мамчич; 14 August 1924 — 3 April 1974) was a Soviet Crimean and Ukrainian painter, teacher and representative of the Cimmerian Art School.

== Early life and education ==
Stepan Havrylovych Mamchich was born on 14 August 1924 in the village of Novopokrovka in Crimean ASSR. In the late 1920s Mamchich's family moved to Feodosia.

From 1937 to 1941, Mamchich studied at the art studio at the Aivazovsky National Art Gallery. Mamchich later resumed his studies 1944.

In 1949, Mamchich left the Aivazovsky National Art Gallery and enrolled at the Crimean Art College named after M. S. Samokysh. Studying under Valentyn Danylovych Bernadskyi, Mamchich graduated in 1951.

== Career ==
In 1945, Mamchich began working for the artel "Crimean. artist" (Ukrainian: Крим. художник), where he copied the artwork of Ivan Aivazovsky.

In 1951, Mamchich began teaching in Gisel, North Ossetian ASSR (present-day North Ossetia–Alania, Russia). Mamchich returned to Feodosia a year later and taught at the Feodosian children's art school until 1954. From 1952 until his death in 1974, Mamchich a taught workshops for the Art Fund of the Ukrainian SSR (Ukrainian: Художественный фонд УССР).

In 1954, Mamchich moved to Simferopol where he continued to cooperate with the artel "Crimean. artist". In 1962, under the recommendation of Tetyana Yablonska, Mamchich was accepted to the USSR Union of Artists.

=== Works ===
Mykola Barsamov, the director of the Aivazovsky National Art Gallery, had a significant influence on Mamchich's early art works («View of Feodosiya», 1948; «Feodosiya», 1948). With time realism features of this period transform into romantic realism painting of the second half of the 1950s («Sea of Azov. Geese on the Shore», 1960, NAMU).

Impressionistic and postimpressionistic influence is apparent in his 1960s art works («In Henichesk», 1961; «Yacht Club», 1961; «Fishing Harbor», 1964, SAM; «Southern Bay», 1964). Starting with the canvas «Swifts and roofs» (1965, SAM) critics start to identify the appearance of new motives in the Stepan's art works which make him easily related to such Cimmerian Art School artists as Konstantin Bogaevsky.

Motives of symbolism deepen in Stepan's works of the second half of the 1960s – beginning of the 1970s, some researchers remark the distinct features of fauvism in the artistic picturesqueness of later period canvases («Fishermen», 1967; «Old Settlement», 1968, SAM; «Old City Roofs», 1969; «Tremontan – northern wind», 1969; «Breath of History», 1973; «Fate. Mistletoe Cottonwood», 1973).

By the mid-1960s Stepan Mamchich elaborated his own author's manner of painting which positions him at grade with older representatives of the Cimmerian Art School.

== Personal life ==
In 1951, Mamchich married Vera Demushkina. Mamchich is the father of the fashion designer Olga Stepanivna Mamchych (Ukrainian: Ольга Степанівна Мамчич; born 1952).

On 3 April 1974 Mamchich died in Simferopol aged 49.

== Gallery ==
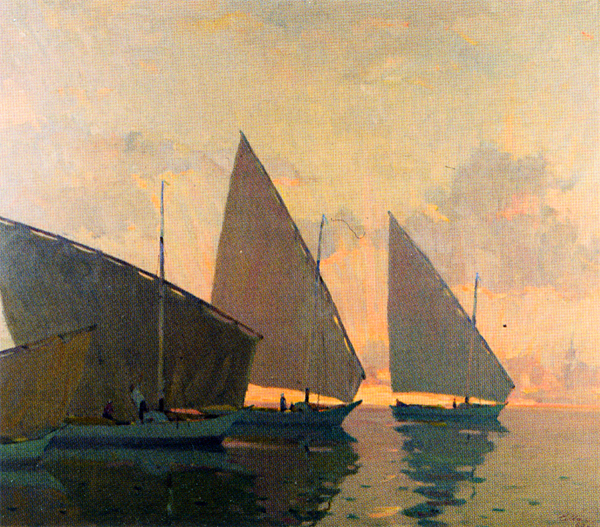
"In Henichesk'" (1961), Aivazovsky National Art Gallery

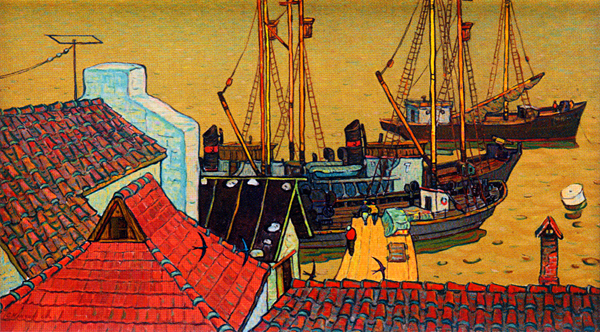
"Swifts and Roofs" (1965), Simferopol Art Museum

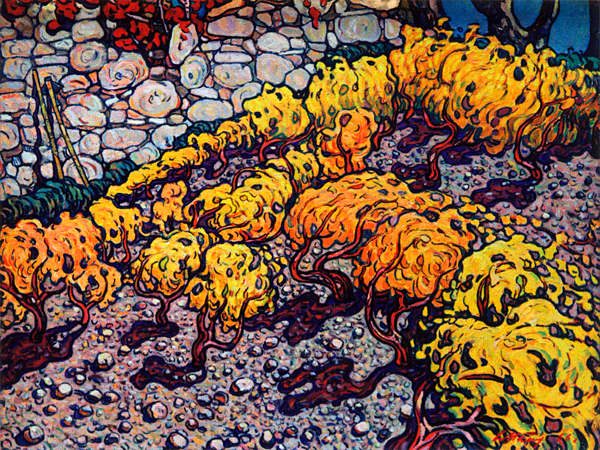
"Old Vineyard" (1966), Simferopol Art Museum

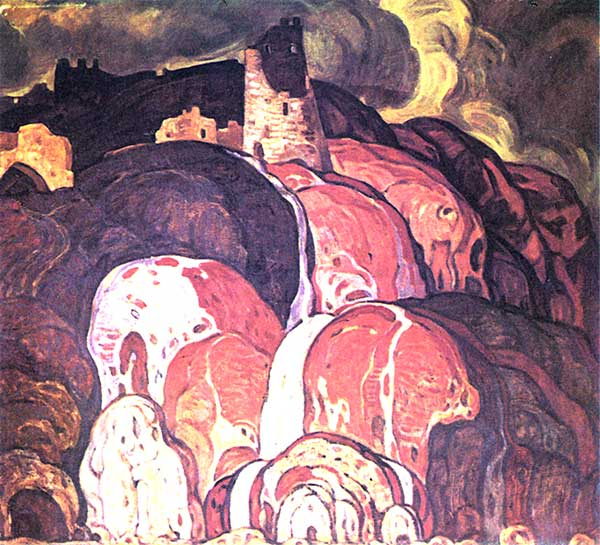
"Breath of History"(1973), Mikhail Kroshitsky Sevastopol Art Museum

== Bibliography ==
- Мамчич Степан Гаврилович. Каталог выставки [Mamchich Stepan. Exhibition Catalog] (PDF) (in Russian). Симферополь: Управление по делам издательств, полиграфии и книжной торговли Крымоблисполкома. 1976.
- Криштоф, Е (1978). Киммерийцы // Сто рассказов о Крыме [Cimmerians // One Hundred Stories About Crimea] (in Russian). Симферополь: Таврия.
- Крымский пейзаж в творчестве художников: Альбом [The Crimean landscape in the works of artists: The Album] (in Russian). Киев: Мистецтво. 1990. ISBN 5-7715-0332-0.
- Сидоренко, С (2016). Киммерийский пейзаж. Истоки и пророки [The Cimmerian landscape. Origins & Prophets] (in Russian). Киев: ФОП Черкащенко Н.Н. ISBN 978-966-97535-0-2.
