= 1931 in fine arts of the Soviet Union =

The year 1931 was marked by many events that left an imprint on the history of Soviet and Russian Fine Arts.

== Events ==
- April 15 — The first exhibition of the «Union of Soviet Artists» artistic society was opened in Moscow. Exhibited 348 works of 54 authors. The participants were Arkady Plastov, Rudolf Frentz, Mikhail Avilov, Piotr Buchkin, Dmitry Kardovsky, Mitrofan Grekov, Arcady Rylov, Vasily Svarog, Konstantin Bogaevsky, Konstantin Rudakov, Nikolai Dormidontov, and other important Russian artists.
- May 12 — The exhibition named «Socialist Construction in the Visual Arts» was opened in Moscow in the Museum of the Revolution. Exhibited 128 works of 76 authors. The participants were Isaak Brodsky, Igor Grabar, Rudolf Frentz, and other important Russian artists.
- August 1 — «The Anti-Imperialist Exhibition» was opened in Moscow in the Central Park of Culture and Leisure. Exhibited 476 works of 175 authors. The participants were Alexander Osmerkin, Sergei Gerasimov, Alexander Deyneka, and other important Russian artists.

== Births ==
- February 16 — Irina Dobrekova (Russian: Добрякова Ирина Михайловна), Russian Soviet painter.
- March 15 — Vladislav Levant (Russian: Левант Владислав Львович), Russian Soviet painter, Honored Art worker of the Russian Federation (d. 1978).
- April 26 — Vera Nazina (Russian: Назина Вера Ивановна), Russian Soviet painter.
- May 7 — Misha Brusilovsky (Russian: Брусиловский Миша Шаевич), Russian Soviet painter, Honoured artist of the Russian Federation.

== Deaths ==
- January 12 — Mikhail Guzhavin (Russian: Гужавин Михаил Маркелович), Russian soviet landscape painter (b. 1888).

== See also ==
- List of Russian artists
- List of painters of Leningrad Union of Artists
- Saint Petersburg Union of Artists
- Russian culture
- 1931 in the Soviet Union

== Sources ==
- Каталог 1-й выставки общества «Союз Советских художников». М., Художник, 1931.
- Каталог выставки «Социалистическое строительство в изобразительном искусстве». М., Музей Революции СССР, 1931.
- Каталог антиимпериалистической выставки, организованной Федерацией объединений советских художников. М.-Л., Огиз-Изогиз, 1931.
- Artists of Peoples of the USSR. Biobibliography Dictionary. Vol. 1. Moscow, Iskusstvo, 1970.
- Artists of Peoples of the USSR. Biobibliography Dictionary. Vol. 2. Moscow, Iskusstvo, 1972.
- Directory of Members of Union of Artists of USSR. Volume 1,2. Moscow, Soviet Artist Edition, 1979.
- Directory of Members of the Leningrad branch of the Union of Artists of Russian Federation. Leningrad, Khudozhnik RSFSR, 1980.
- Artists of Peoples of the USSR. Biobibliography Dictionary. Vol. 4 Book 1. Moscow, Iskusstvo, 1983.
- Directory of Members of the Leningrad branch of the Union of Artists of Russian Federation. – Leningrad: Khudozhnik RSFSR, 1987.
- Персональные и групповые выставки советских художников. 1917-1947 гг. М., Советский художник, 1989.
- Artists of peoples of the USSR. Biobibliography Dictionary. Vol. 4 Book 2. – Saint Petersburg: Academic project humanitarian agency, 1995.
- Link of Times: 1932 – 1997. Artists – Members of Saint Petersburg Union of Artists of Russia. Exhibition catalogue. – Saint Petersburg: Manezh Central Exhibition Hall, 1997.
- Matthew C. Bown. Dictionary of 20th Century Russian and Soviet Painters 1900-1980s. – London: Izomar, 1998.
- Vern G. Swanson. Soviet Impressionism. – Woodbridge, England: Antique Collectors' Club, 2001.
- Sergei V. Ivanov. Unknown Socialist Realism. The Leningrad School. – Saint-Petersburg: NP-Print Edition, 2007. – ISBN 5901724216, ISBN 9785901724217.
- Anniversary Directory graduates of Saint Petersburg State Academic Institute of Painting, Sculpture, and Architecture named after Ilya Repin, Russian Academy of Arts. 1915 – 2005. – Saint Petersburg: Pervotsvet Publishing House, 2007.
