= Mikhail Demyanov =

Russian painter

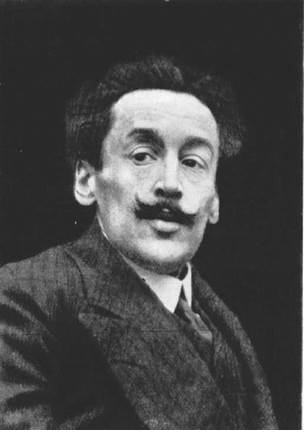
Mikhail Demyanov (from Niva, c.1912)

Mikhail Aleksandrovich Demyanov (Russian: Михаил Александрович Демьянов; 7 December 1873, Arti - 23 June 1913, Nodenthal) was a Russian Impressionist painter and designer; known for his landscapes and portraits.

== Biography ==
From 1892 to 1903, he studied at the Moscow School of Painting, Sculpture and Architecture with Isaac Levitan. He received a silver medal for his work in 1899.

From 1903 to 1910, he continued his training at the graduate school of the Imperial Academy of Fine Arts with Alexander Kiselyov. Upon graduating he was awarded the title of "Artist" for his painting "Old Age" and, shortly after, was given the Yendogurov Prize (named after the landscape painting brothers, Sergey and Ivan Yendogurov), which was presented by the Academy. His work "The Breath of Spring" earned him a scholarship to study abroad.

During these years, he also created illustrations for several periodicals and did portraits of the director and several actors who were involved in a production of The Government Inspector by Gogol.

From 1910 to 1912, he travelled extensively, copying the Old Masters in Rome, Venice, Paris and Amsterdam. Upon returning to Russia, he settled in Saint Petersburg. Over the course of his career, he participated in numerous exhibitions at the Academy, the Society of Moscow Artists and the Salon des indépendants in Paris, with a notable showing at the 1909 Internationale Kunst-Ausstellung in the Munich Glaspalast.

He died at the age of only thirty-nine, possibly from tuberculosis, while staying at a resort in Finland. A major retrospective of his work was held in 1914.

== Selected paintings ==
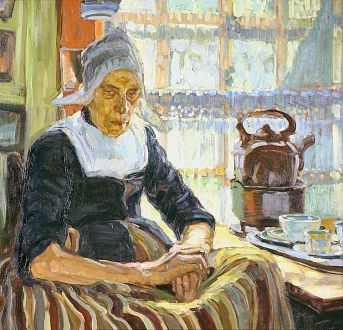
Flemish Woman

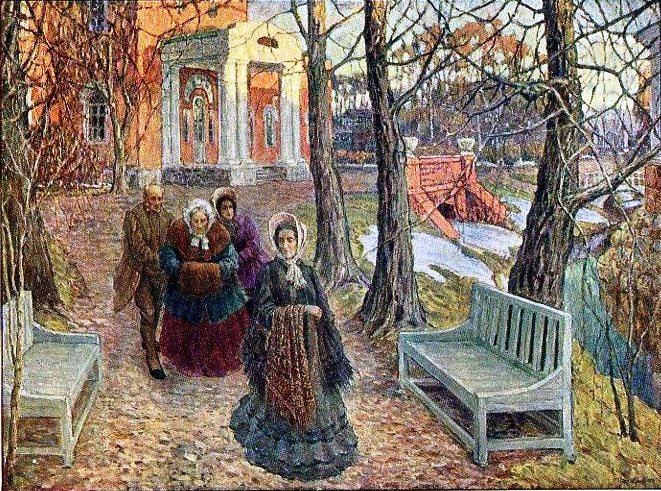
Old Age

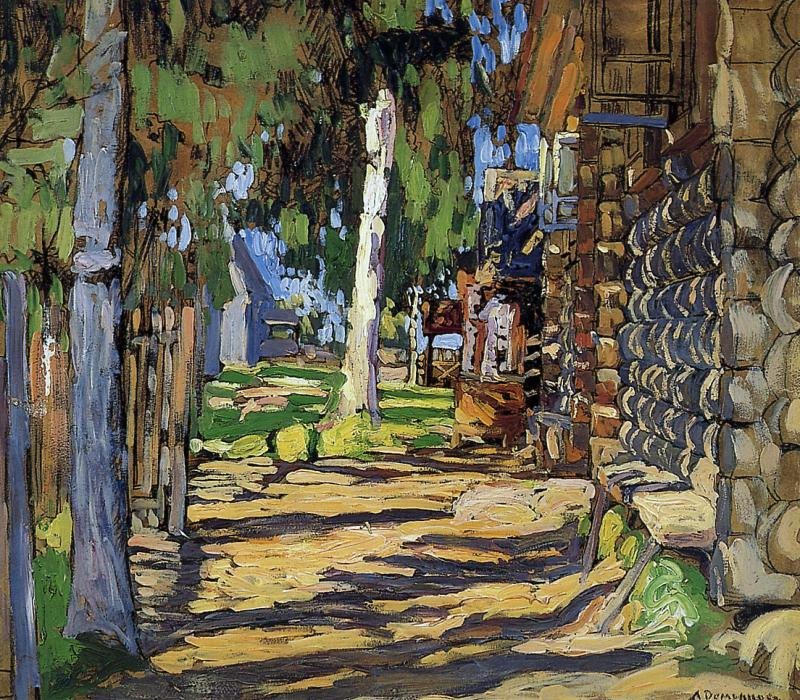
Village Alley in the Sunlight

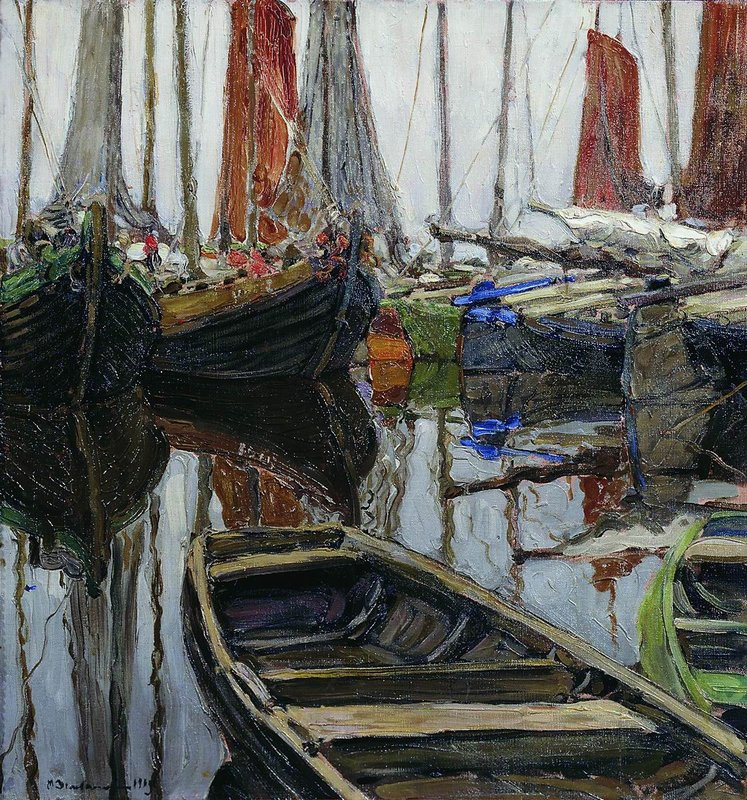
Boats
