= Mikhail Guzhavin =

Russian painter

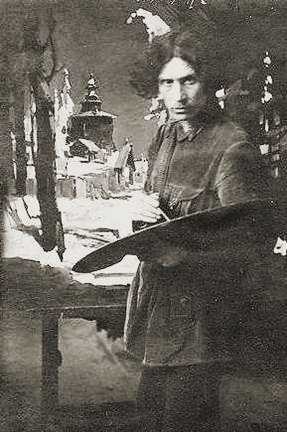
Mikhail Guzhavin in his studio (late 1920s)

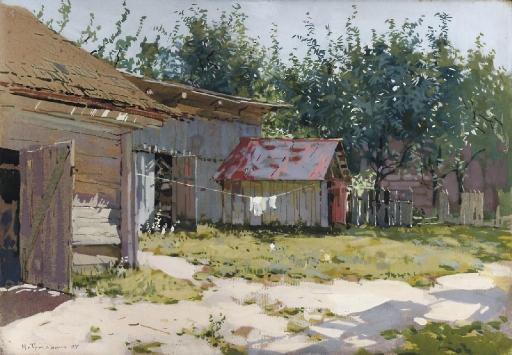
Summer in the Yard

Mikhail Markelovich Guzhavin (Russian: Михаил Маркелович Гужавин; 17 February 1888, Guzhavino, Urzhumsky District — 12 January 1931, Saint Petersburg) was a Russian landscape painter and graphic artist.

== Biography ==
He was born to a peasant family who became curates of the local church. His first art lessons were in the icon-painting workshop at the Imperial Society for the Encouragement of the Arts. In 1911, he entered the landscape painting class led by Nikolay Dubovskoy at the Imperial Academy of Arts and was influenced by the style of Isaac Levitan.

In 1917, his painting "Quiet Night" earned him the title of "Artist" and a stipend to continue his studies abroad, which he did not take advantage of. That same year, he became the last recipient of the Yendogurov Prize (named after the landscape painting brothers, Sergey and Ivan Yendogurov), which was presented by the Academy.

He set up a studio and remained in Saint Petersburg (then Petrograd) until the early 1920s, when the Civil War made the situation there too difficult. He relocated to the Poltava region and set up a new studio with a workshop, where he gave lessons until 1924. Despite this attempt to flee the turmoil, there is evidence that he came close to being executed by the White Army. Shortly after, he returned to Saint Petersburg (then Leningrad). Some sources indicate that he died in 1929, but works with later dates exist.

During his career, he exhibited frequently, interrupted only by the Civil War; at the Spring exhibitions of the Imperial Academy, with the "Общины художников" (Community of Artists), the Kuindzhi Society and the Peredvizhniki. Most of his works are in regional museums or private collections.
