= Mykola Barsamov =

Ukrainian Soviet artist and researcher

- Микола Степанович
- Born: Микола Барсамов Степанович; Mykola Stepanovych Barsamov; 16 November [O.S. 4 November] 1892; Tiflis, Tiflis Governorate, Caucasus Viceroyalty, Russian Empire
- Died: 10 March 1976 (aged 83); Feodosia, Crimean Oblast, Ukrainian SSR, USSR
- Education: Moscow School of Painting, Sculpture and Architecture, 1917
- Occupations: Artist; art critic; researcher
- Spouse: Sofia Barsamova (died 1971)

Mykola Stepanovych Barsamov (Ukrainian: Микола Барсамов Степанович; 16 November [O.S. 4 November] 1892 – 10 March 1976) was a Georgian-born Ukrainian Soviet artist, art critic and researcher specializing in the work of Ivan Aivazovsky.

== Biography ==
Mykola Stepanovych Barsamov was born on 16 November [O.S. 4 November] 1892 in Tiflis (present-day Tbilisi, Georgia). In 1913, he graduated from the Rostov School of Drawing. He studied in the private studio of Ilya Mashkov in Moscow. In 1913–1917, he studied at the Moscow School of Painting, Sculpture and Architecture.

In the late 1910s and early 1920s, he worked as a drawing teacher in the city of Izyum, in Samara, and as a retouching artist in Moscow.

Director of the Feodosia Historical and Archaeological Museum (1923–1936), Feodosia Art Gallery (1923–1962); scientific consultant of the Feodosia Art Gallery. I.K. Aivazovsky (1962–1976). He made a disproportionate contribution to increasing the funds of the art gallery, because the artist I.K. Aivazovsky left 49 of his works in Feodosia, and all of them were painted in the last years of the marine painter's life. Barsamov organized an art studio at the gallery in the 1930s and an art school in 1952.

He was awarded the title of Honored Artist of the USSR (1969). Honorary citizen of Feodosia (1962).

The figure of Barsamov became a link that connected the two generations of representatives of the Cimmerian Art School. Barsamov's students included:

- Stepan Mamchich
- Volodymyr Sokolov
- Petro Stolyarenko
- Mykola Shorin (Ukrainian: Микола Шорін)

== Art and books ==
Barsamov created a number of paintings on the heroic history of the Crimea, portraits, landscapes and still lifes. Paintings "The Battleship Potemkin" (1941), "Marines in Feodosia" (1942), "Reconstruction of the Feodosia Port" (1947), "Grapes and peaches" (1959), portraits, landscapes of the Crimea, etc. Books about Aivazovsky, including Ivan Konstantinovich Aivazovsky (several editions).

== Personal life ==
Barsamov was married to the art critic Sofia Barsamova (1900–1971).
