= 1931 in the Soviet Union =

- Decades: 1920s; 1930s; 1940s; 1950s
- See also: History of the Soviet Union; List of years in the Soviet Union

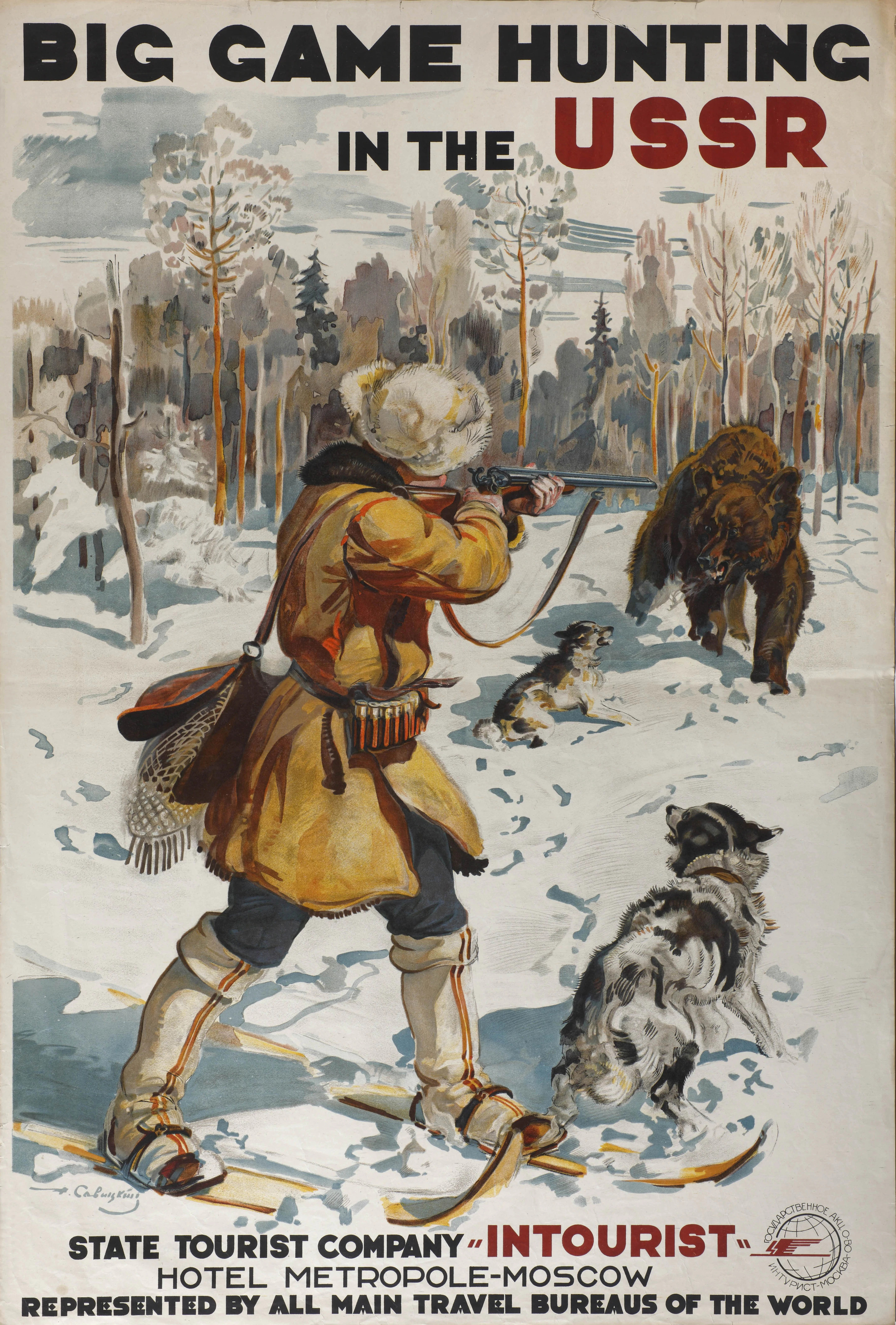
1931 poster advertising Big Game Hunting in the USSR

The following lists events that happened during 1931 in the Union of Soviet Socialist Republics.

== Incumbents ==
- General Secretary of the Communist Party of the Soviet Union – Joseph Stalin
- Chairman of the Central Executive Committee of the Congress of Soviets – Mikhail Kalinin
- Chairman of the Council of People's Commissars of the Soviet Union – Vyacheslav Molotov

== Events ==
=== March ===
- 1–8 March – The 1931 Menshevik Trial is held.

=== April ===
- 27 April – 1931 Zangezur earthquake

== Births ==
- 1 January – Anatoli Ivanovich Bogdanov, Olympic shooter (died 2001)
- 17 January – Yury Rudov, Olympic fencer (died 2013)
- 21 January – Tatjana Michaylovna Zacharova, production worker, author and politician
- 22 January – Galina Zybina, Olympic athlete (died 2024)
- 1 February – Boris Yeltsin, first President of Russia (died 2007)
- 2 March – Mikhail Gorbachev, last leader of the Soviet Union (died 2022)
- 13 March – Alisa Aksyonova, museum director
- 23 March – Yevdokiya Mekshilo, Olympic skier
- 29 March – Aleksei Gubarev, cosmonaut
- 7 April – Lyubov Vorona, Ukrainian farm worker and politician (died 2021)
- 27 April – Igor Oistrakh, Ukrainian violinist
- 25 May – Georgy Grechko, cosmonaut
- 25 June – Anatoli Georgievich Vitushkin, mathematician
- 27 June – Anatoli Ilyin, footballer
- 24 September – Mark Midler, Olympic fencer
- 28 September – Emma Yefimova, Olympic fencer
- 24 October – Sofia Gubaidulina, composer (died 2025)
- 1 November – Dmitri Bashkirov, pianist (died 2021)
- 21 November – Revaz Dogonadze, Georgian physicist (died 1985)

== Deaths ==
- 23 January – Anna Pavlova, Russian ballerina, died in The Hague (born 1881)
- 15 August – Nigar Shikhlinskaya, first Azerbaijani nurse (born 1871 or 1878)

== See also ==
- 1931 in fine arts of the Soviet Union
- List of Soviet films of 1931
