= Sergey Yendogurov =

Russian painter

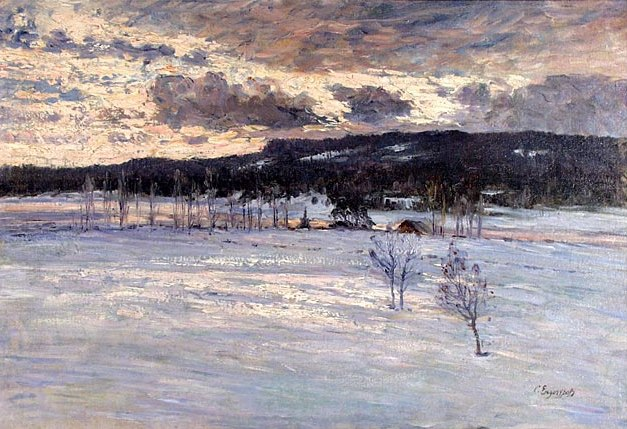
Winter Landscape

Sergey Ivanovich Yendogurov (Russian: Сергей Иванович Ендогуров; 11 October 1864, Saint Petersburg - 4 December 1894, Saint Petersburg) was a Russian landscape painter and watercolorist in the Neo-Classical style. His brother, Ivan, was also a well-known landscape painter.

== Biography ==
His father, Ivan Yendogurov, was a Counter Admiral in the Imperial Russian Navy. His mother was the daughter of Admiral Fyodor Yuriev. While attending the gymnasium, he and his brother became acquainted with the landscape painter, Yefim Volkov, who stimulated their interest in art.

Unlike Ivan, however, Sergey never had any formal artistic training. He attended the Russian Naval Academy in 1884 and became an officer. From 1885 to 1888, he was a member of the crew on the clipper Вестник (Herald); serving in the Pacific.

During that time, he taught himself watercolor painting and, when he retired from service, became a member of the "Society of Russian Watercolorists"; painting a large number of scenes depicting the places he visited while on duty.

He died of tuberculosis in 1894; the same disease that would claim his brother four years later. In 1899, his mother endowed a fund at the Imperial Academy of Arts to establish the "Yendogurov Prize" for landscape painting. It was awarded until 1917.
