= Ivan Yendogurov =

Russian painter

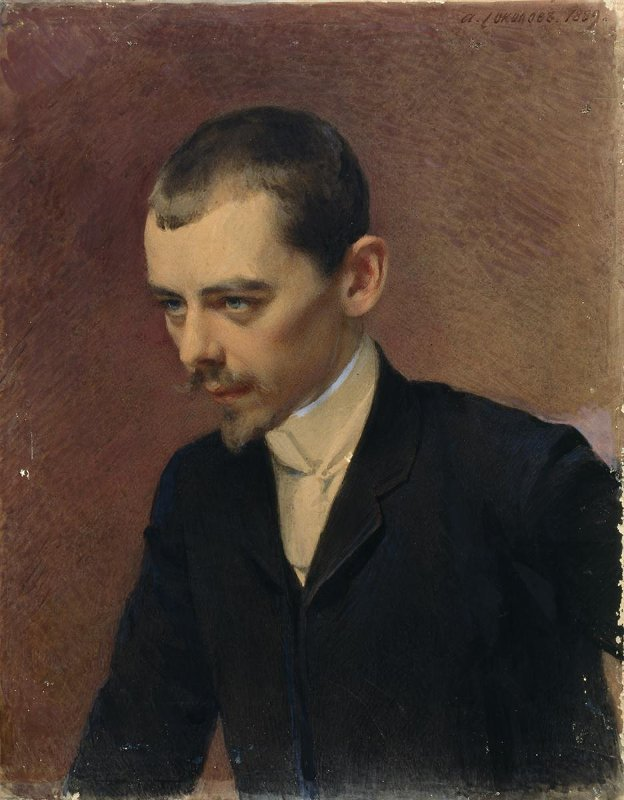
Ivan Yendogurov; portrait by Alexander Sokolov (1889)

Ivan Ivanovich Yendogurov (Russian: Иван Иванович Ендогуров; 23 October 1861, Kronstadt – 17 May 1898, Capri) was a Russian landscape painter and watercolorist; associated with the Peredvizhniki. His younger brother, Sergey was also a well-known artist.

== Biography ==
His father, Ivan Yendogurov, was a Counter Admiral in the Imperial Russian Navy. His mother was the daughter of Admiral Fyodor Yuriev. While attending the gymnasium, he and his brother became acquainted with the landscape painter, Yefim Volkov, and decided to make art their career.

After graduating in 1880, he began studying law at Saint Petersburg State University, but continued to take lessons from Volkov. In 1884, he left the University to audit classes at the Imperial Academy of Arts. His first exhibit came the following year and he was awarded a major silver medal in 1890.

From 1885 through to the early 1890s, he exhibited prolifically, at the Imperial Society for the Encouragement of the Arts, as well as with the Peredvizhniki; participating also in the Exposition Universelle (1889) and the World's Columbian Exposition.

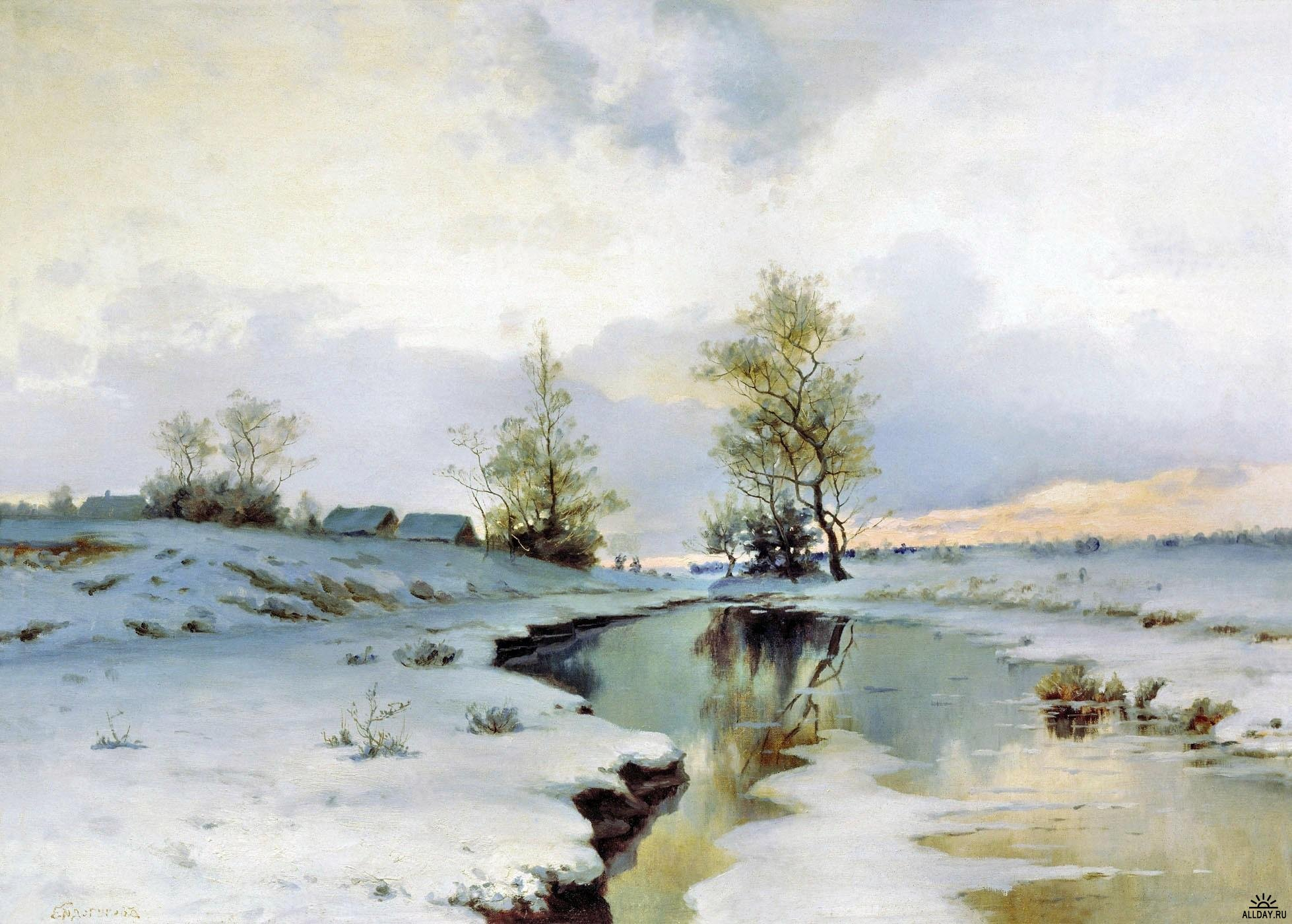
The Beginning of Spring

During this time, he developed the first symptoms of tuberculosis. From 1890 to 1893, he lived in Italy (primarily Corsica), then spent a short time in southern France. After a stay at a spa in Bavaria, he decided to live in Crimea from 1894 to 1895. Most of his paintings from there appear to be lost. Later, he returned to Italy and died of his illness on the island of Capri.

Toward the end of 1898, the Imperial Academy held a joint retrospective for three artists who had died that year: Yendogurov, Nikolai Yaroshenko and Ivan Shishkin. The following year, his mother endowed a fund at the Academy to establish the "Yendogurov Prize" for landscape painting. It was awarded until 1917.
