= Yefim Volkov =

Russian painter

- Ефим Ефимович Волков
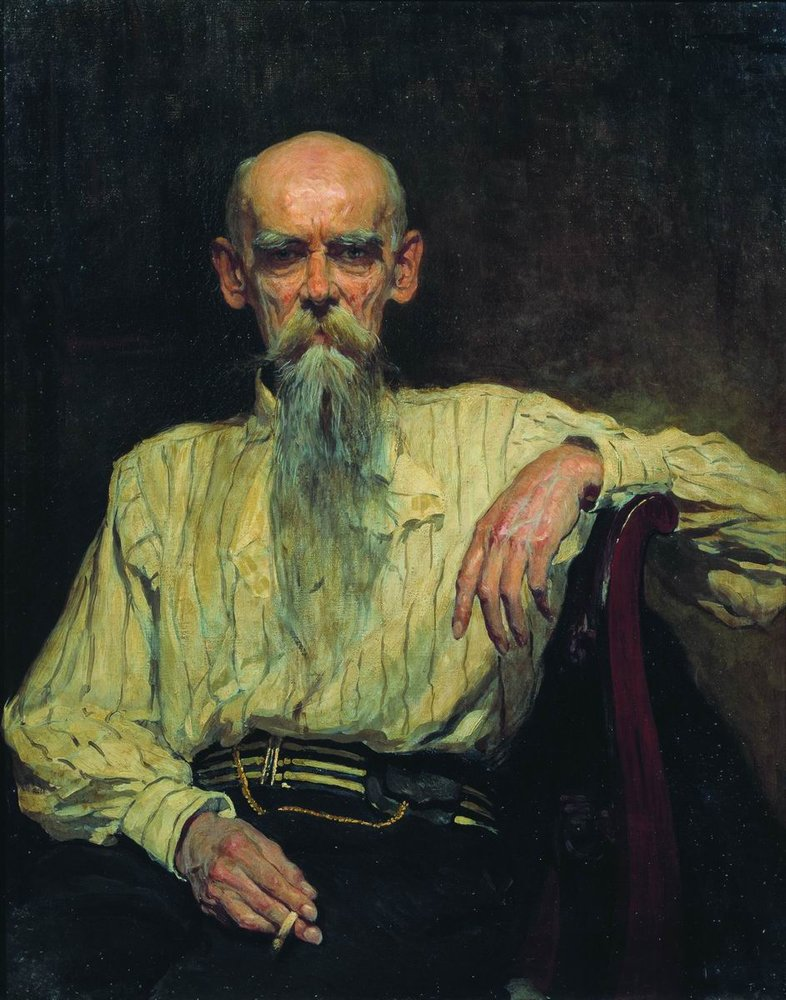
- Volkov (1914), by Aleksandr Makovsky
- Born: 4 April 1844; Saint Petersburg, Russian Empire
- Died: 17 February 1920 (aged 75); Petrograd, Russian Soviet Federative Socialist Republic
- Resting place: Smolensky Cemetery, Saint Petersburg
- Education: Member Academy of Arts (1899); Full Member Academy of Arts (1895)
- Alma mater: Imperial Academy of Arts (1870)
- Known for: Painting
- Movement: Peredvizhniki

Yefim Yefimovich Volkov (Russian: Ефим Ефимович Волков; 4 April 1844 – 17 February 1920) was a Russian landscape painter.

== Biography ==
His father was a feldsher and his family was poor. He was briefly employed by the Ministry of Justice. In 1866, he began to take drawing lessons at the "Imperial Society for the Encouragement of the Arts". He later studied at the Imperial Academy of Fine Arts and honed his skills by doing sketches from nature. In 1870, he received the title of "Free Artist" in recognition of his painting "View of Saint Petersburg and Vicinity".

In 1878, he joined the "Association of Travelling Art Exhibitions" (Peredvizhniki) and presented annual displays of his work under their aegis. The death of his daughter in 1884 caused him several years of grief but, in 1888, he was finally able to make an extensive tour of Greece, Turkey, Egypt and Palestine with his wife, where he painted landscapes with sea views. Later, they toured the Volga region.

He became a full member of the Academy in 1895 and was named an Academician four years later. After the events of Bloody Sunday, the Peredvizhniki came under police scrutiny, interest in their work began to decline and Volkov's career never recovered. He died in "genteel poverty" at his home on Vasilievsky Island.

== Selected paintings ==
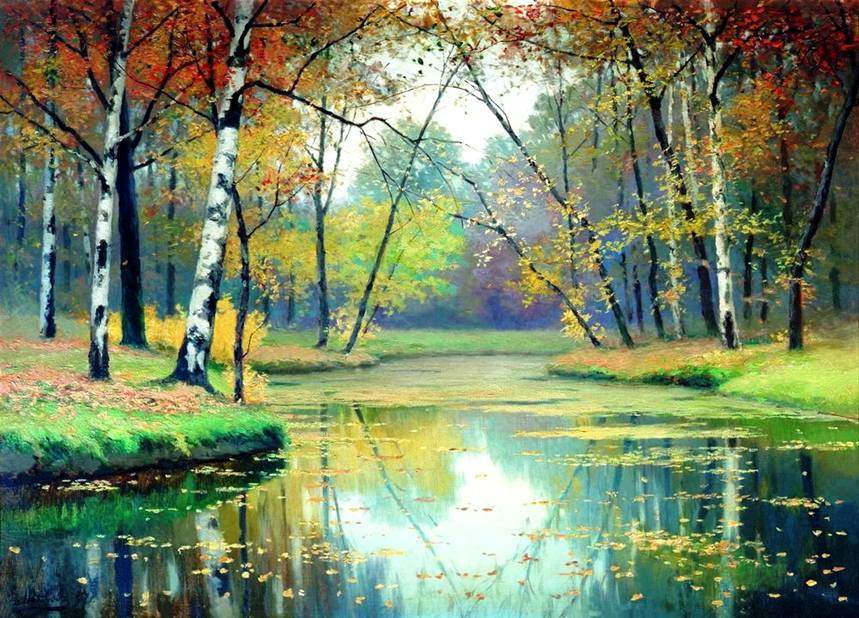
Autumn Landscape (1897)

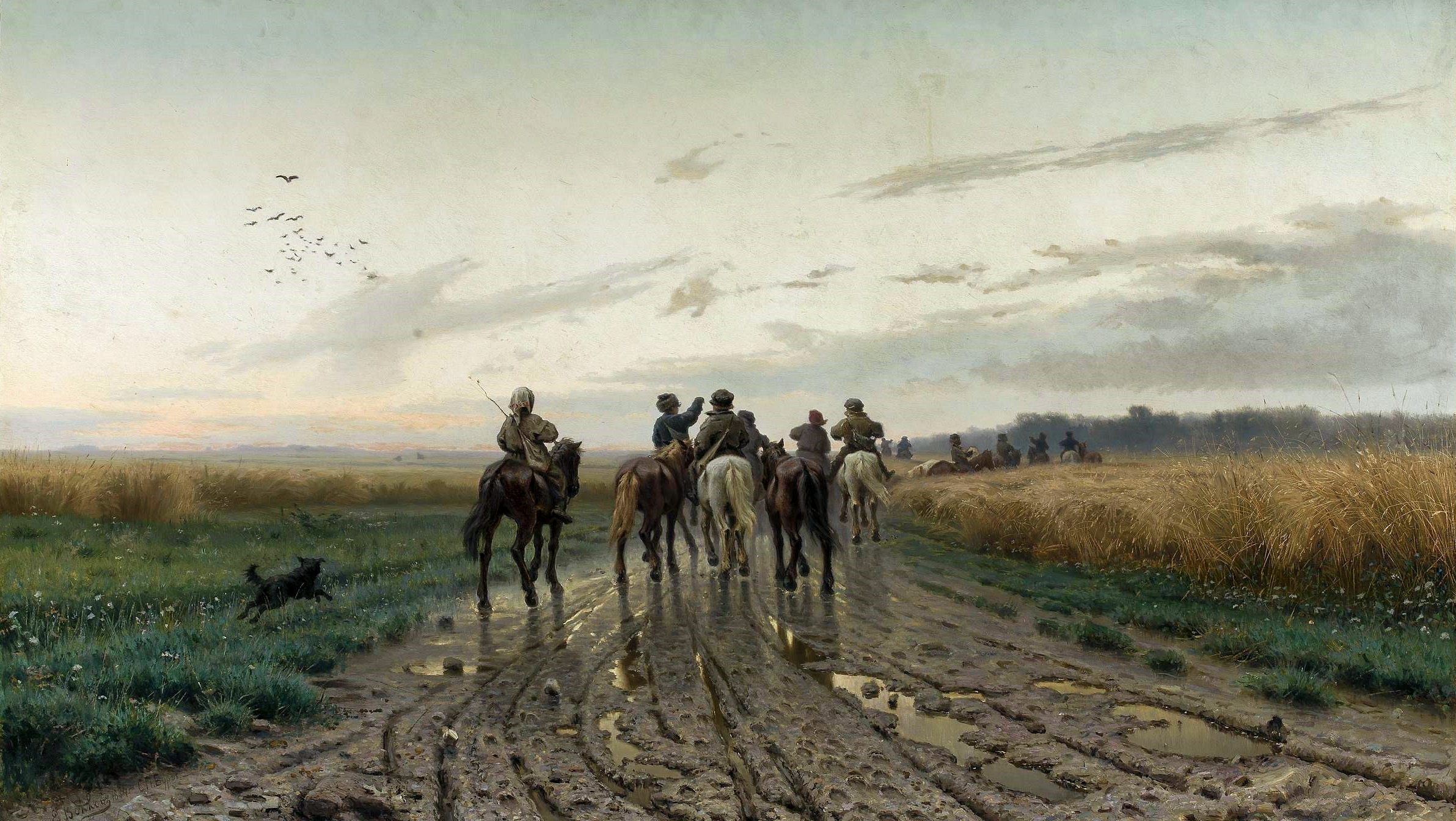
On the Way to the Pasture (1884)

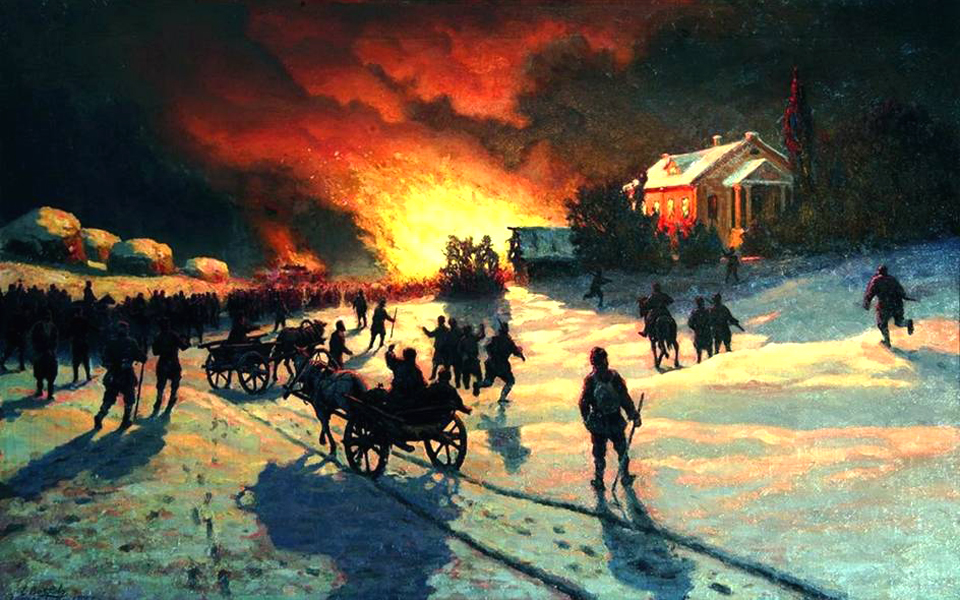
The Fire (date unknown)

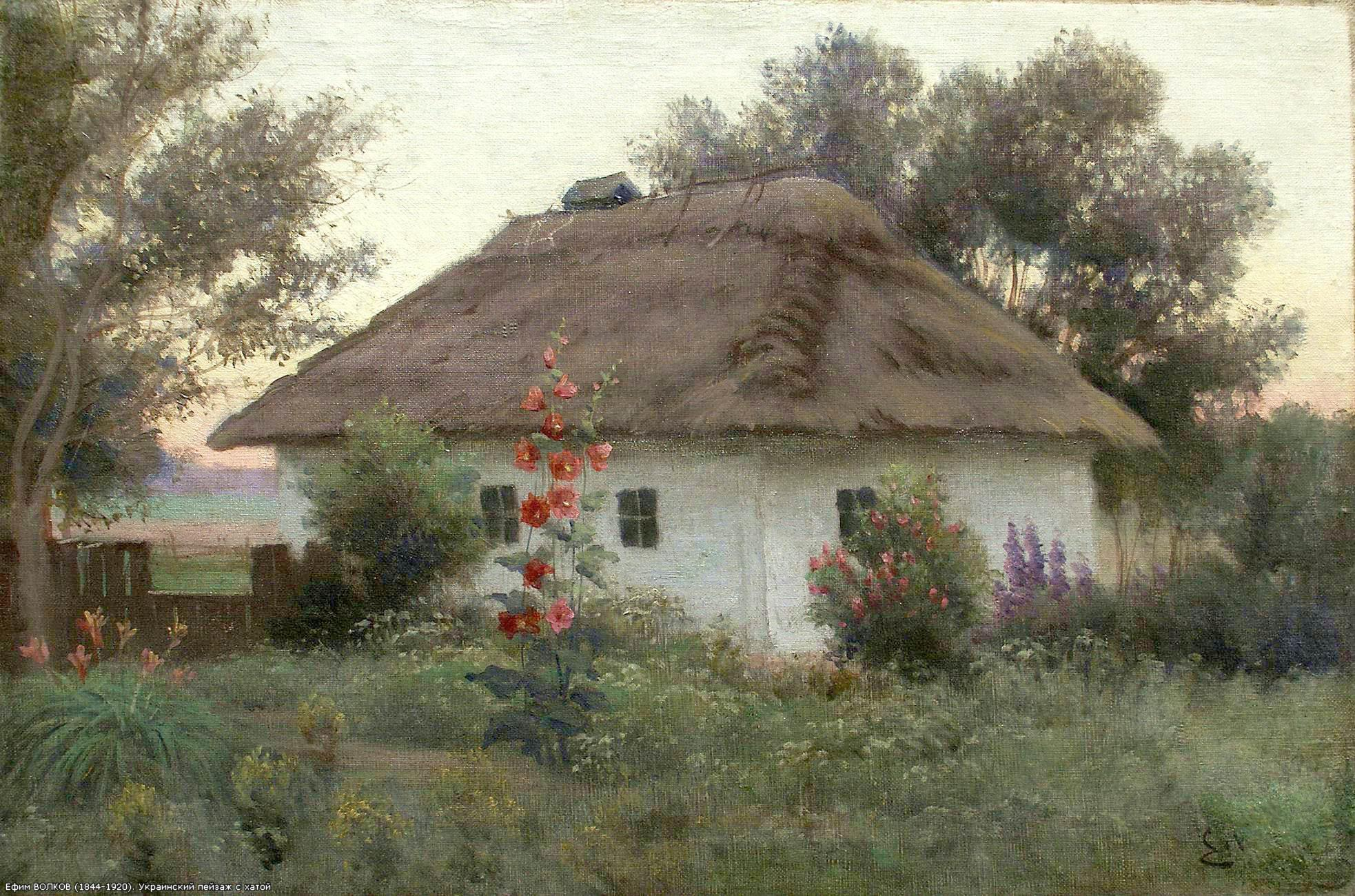
Ukrainian Landscape
with Hut (1910)

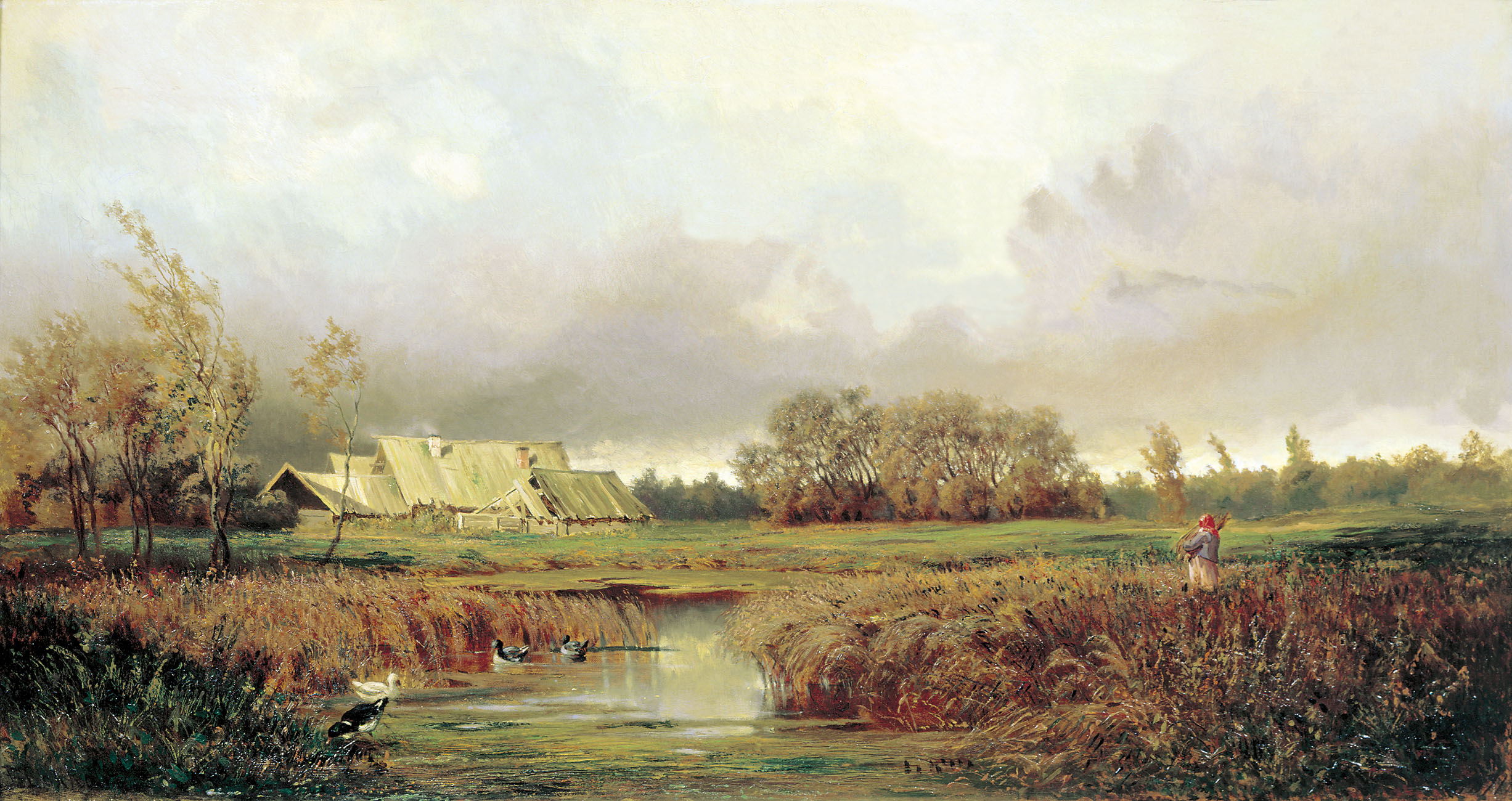
Marsh in Autumn (1871)

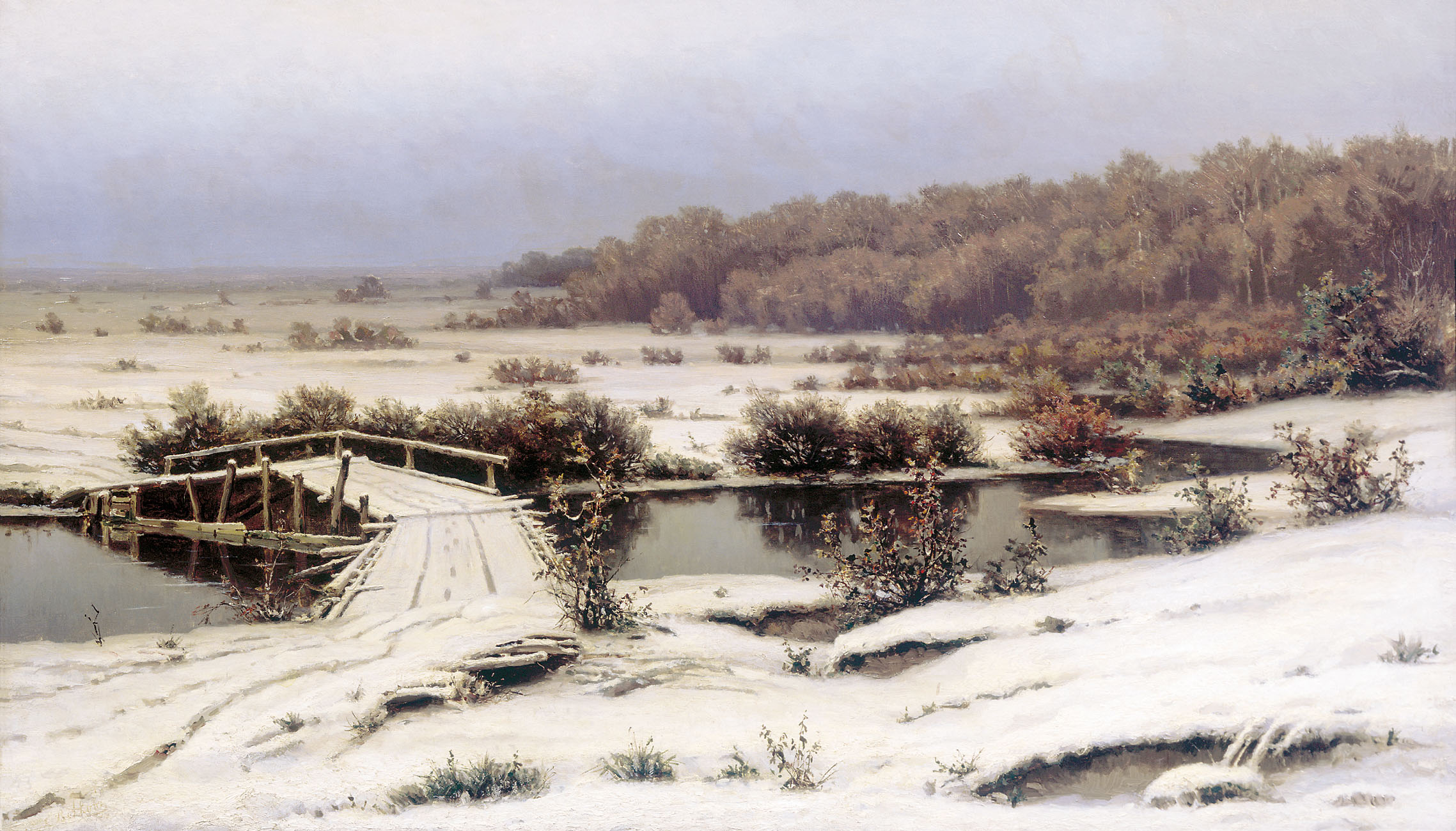
The First Snow (1883)

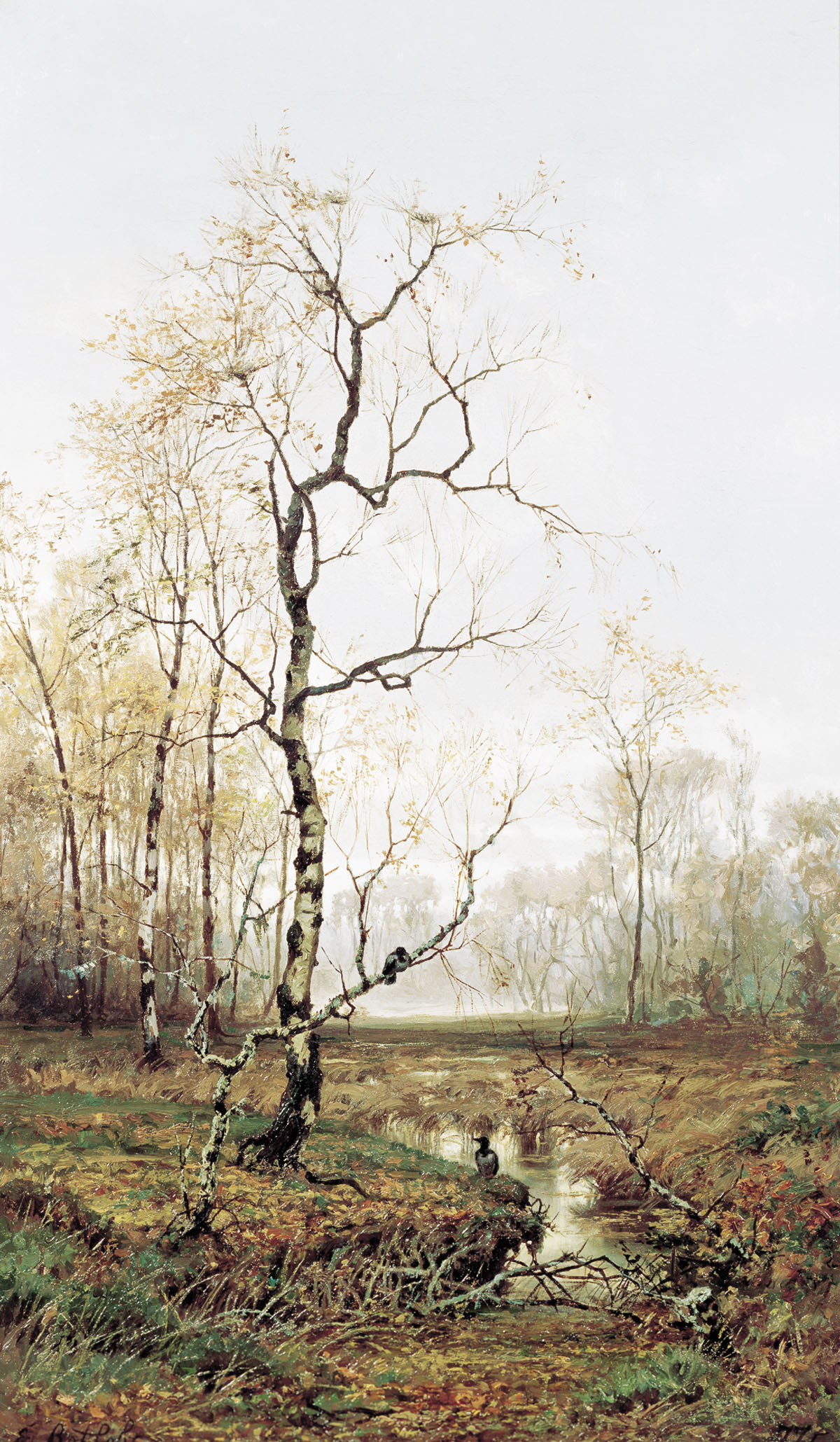
Forest. In Spring. (1877)

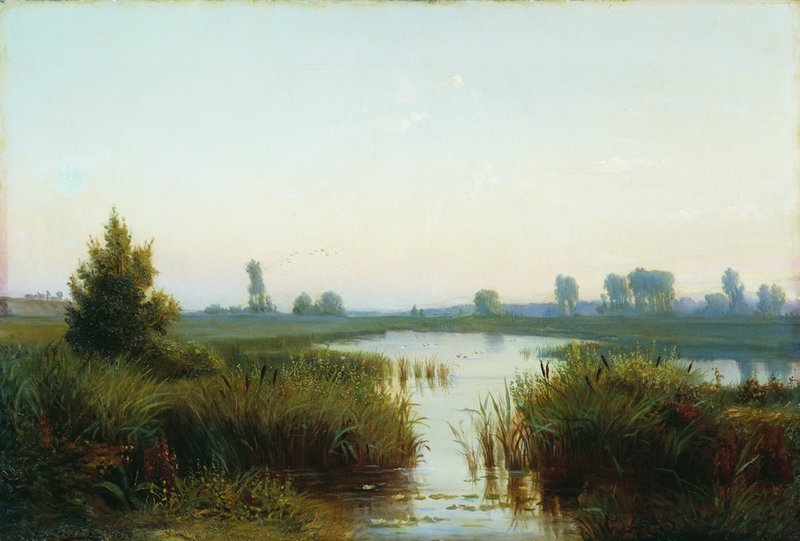
Landscape with a Swamp (1898)
