= Konstantin Bogaevsky =

Russian artist

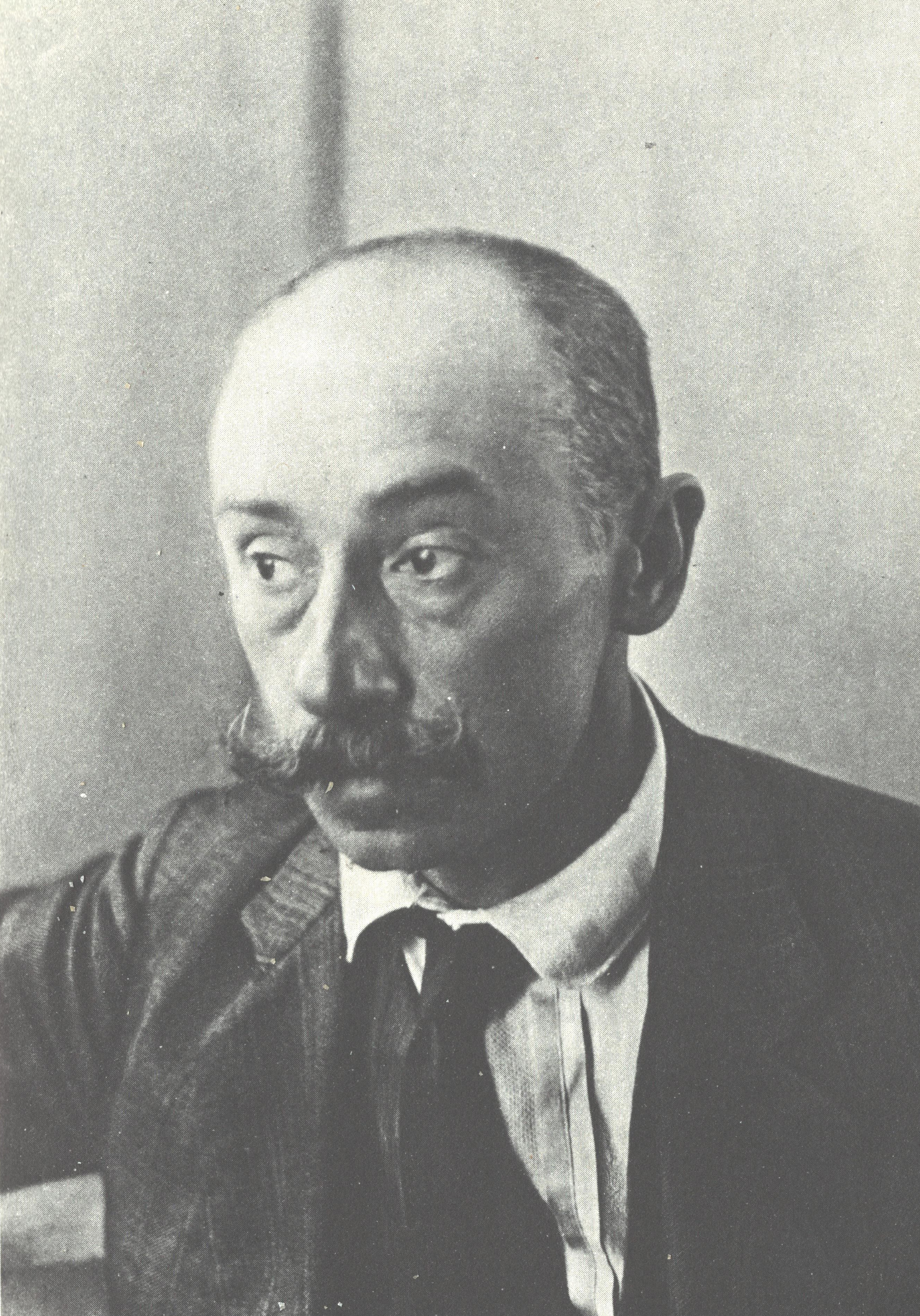
- Born: 24 January 1872; Feodosia, Russian Empire (now Crimea)
- Died: 17 February 1943 (aged 71); Feodosia, Crimean Autonomous Soviet Socialist Republic, Russian SFSR, Soviet Union (now Crimea)
- Education: Imperial Academy of Arts
- Known for: Landscape painting
- Movement: Symbolism, Mir iskusstva, Socialist realism

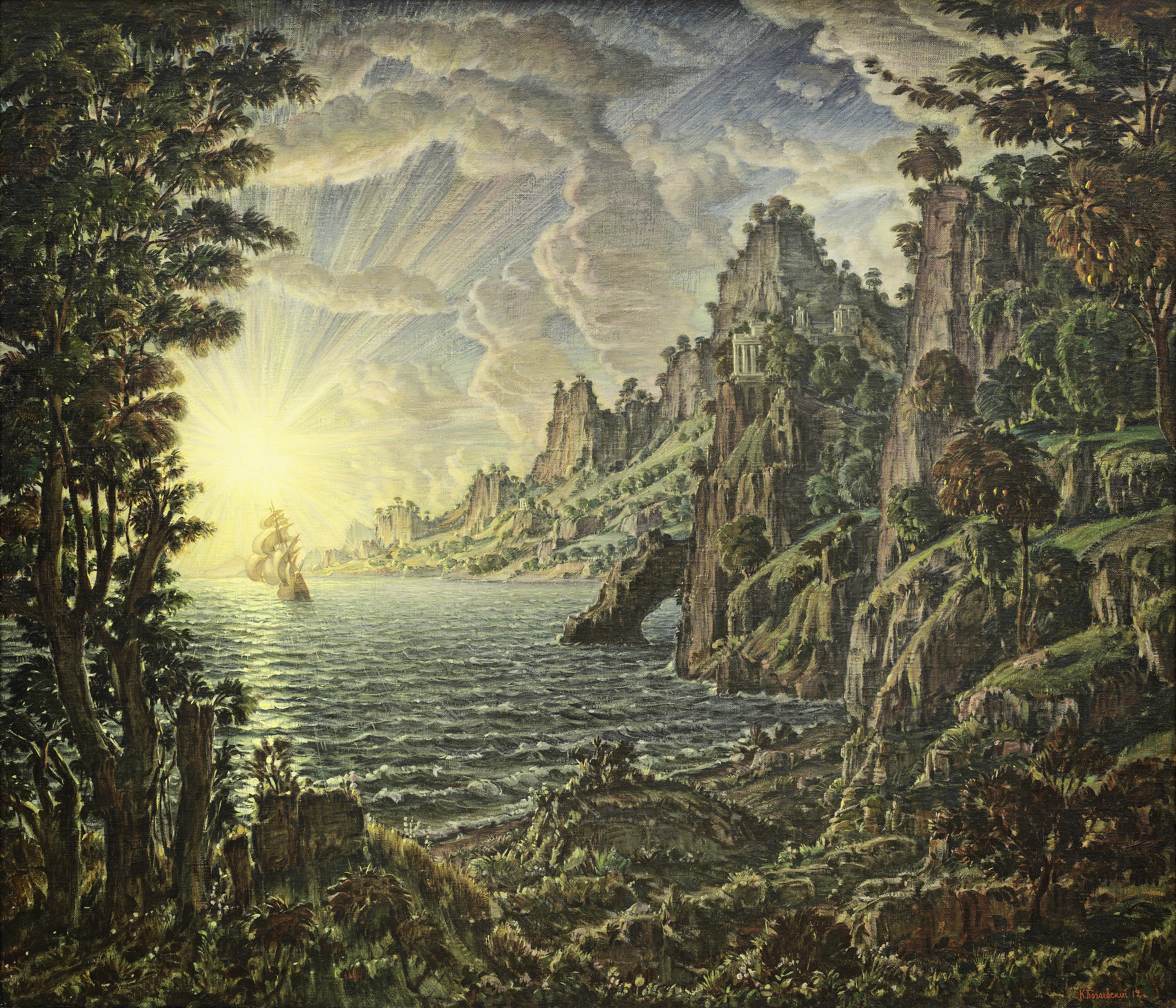
Ships. Evening Sun 1912

Konstantin Fyodorovich Bogaevsky (Ukrainian: Костянти́н Фе́дорович Богає́вський, romanized: Kostiantyn Fedorovych Bohaievskyi; Russian: Константин Фёдорович Богаевский, romanized: Konstantin Fyodorovich Bogayevsky 24 January [O.S. 12 January] 1872 – 17 February 1943) was a Ukrainian and Russian painter from Crimea, notable for his Symbolist landscapes.

== Biography ==
Konstantin Bogaevsky was born in the Eastern Crimean city of Feodosia to an old Italian-German family of the Genoese extraction on 24 January [O.S. 12 January] 1872. He took first lessons in art from Ivan Aivazovsky.

In 1891-1897 he studied at the Imperial Academy of Arts in the class of Arkhip Kuindzhi. The art of young Konstantin was not popular with the academy and he was even at some stage temporarily discharged from the academy for "lack of talent". Despite this, Kuindzhi always had a high respect for his pupil and protected him. In 1898 Konstantin traveled to Italy and France where he became acquainted with the works of Claude Lorrain, whom he proclaimed as his true teacher. His first exhibition was in Moscow in 1898.

From 1900 Bogaevsky worked in Feodosia. The main theme of his works became the symbolist landscapes of a non-existent land (known to his friends as Bogaevia) that he saw only in his dreams. Konstantin Bogaevsky became a popular painter after Maximilian Voloshin published a series of essays titled Konstantin Bogaevsky. Voloshin highly praised the symbolism of Bogaevsky's paintings. Contemporaries often drew parallels between Bogaevsky and Nicholas Roerich.

Bogaevsky was a member of Mir iskusstva, Union of Russian Artists, and the Zhar-Tsvet. In 1906 he exhibited his paintings on Exposition de l'Art Russe organized by Sergei Diaghilev. In 1911 he visited Italy and discovered for himself the paintings of Andrea Mantegna, which were to strongly influence Bogaevsky's own later work.

Bogaevsky returned in 1912 to Feodosia where he was to remain for the rest of his life. He maintained a friendship of many years with another famous Feodosian and a bard of a non-existent land, Alexander Grin, as well as with the Koktebel group of Russian Intelligentsia including Maximilian Voloshin, Marina Tsvetaeva, and Osip Mandelstam.

After the October Revolution Bogaevsky retreated into relative obscurity, although works such as the 1932 Port of an Imaginary City were highly regarded as art in the school of socialist realism painting of the DnieproGES.

He died at Feodosia on 17 February 1943, hit in the head by shrapnel during a Soviet air raid. A minor planet, 3839 Bogaevskij, discovered by Soviet astronomer Nikolai Chernykh in 1971, is named after him.

== Style and Works ==
In 1902-1903 Konstantin Bogaevsky created a series of paintings based on the familiar Crimean landscapes ("The Old Crimea", "The Ancient Fortress"). For a long time after that, he painted landscapes, not tied to particular places, in which the influence of Böcklin and Klimt is noticeable. They are characterised by special lighting, originating from several stains of colour, and expressive skies. Besides Klimt, parallels in Western European painting can be found in Giovanni Segantini. Influenced by Maximilian Voloshin, Bogayevsky paints the so-called "Cimmerian cycle" of paintings. "In my compositions, I try to convey the image of this Earth – majestic and beautiful, solemn and sad. This landscape, saturated with a great historical past, with a peculiar rhythm of mountains, tense folds of hills, bearing a somewhat austere character, serves as an inexhaustible source for me..." – wrote Bogaevsky.

From 1906, after long isolation in military service in Kerch, philosophical motifs associated with loneliness and the smallness of man appear in Bogayevsky's work.

After a trip to Europe, starting in 1910, Bogayevsky painted classical landscapes, clearly inspired by German (Dürer, Altdorfer) and Italian (Mantegna) Renaissance masters, as well as by the undoubted influence of Claude Lorrain, from whom Bogayevsky borrowed the idea of lighting. In 1912, Bogaevsky painted three panels for the Moscow residence of Stepan Ryabushinsky.

Tretyakov Gallery, Russian Museum, Feodosia Art Gallery, Sevastopol Art Museum, Simferopol Art Museum, and Sochi Art Museum are the most widely represented museums.

== Selected paintings ==
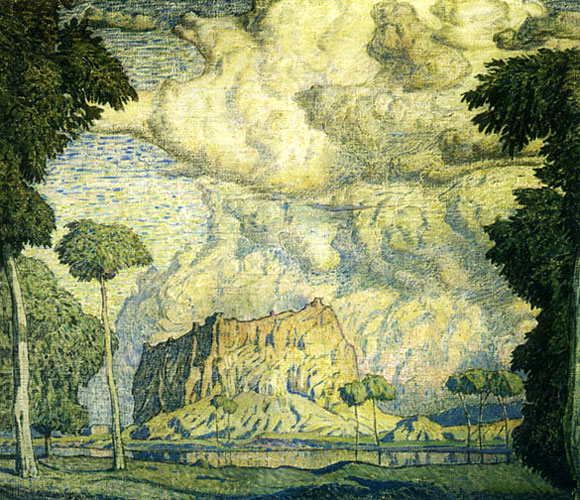
Tropical Landscape, 1906

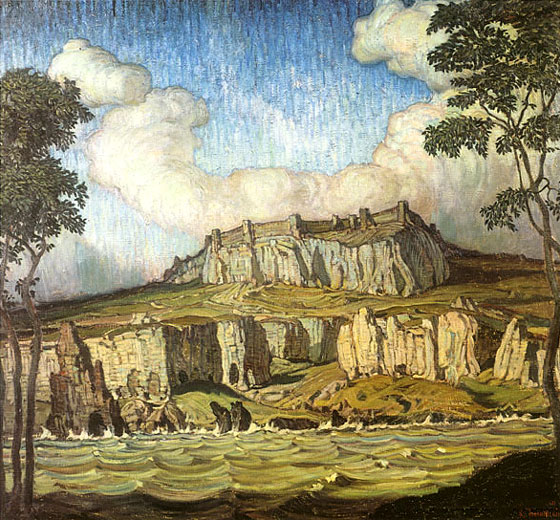
Sea Shore, 1907

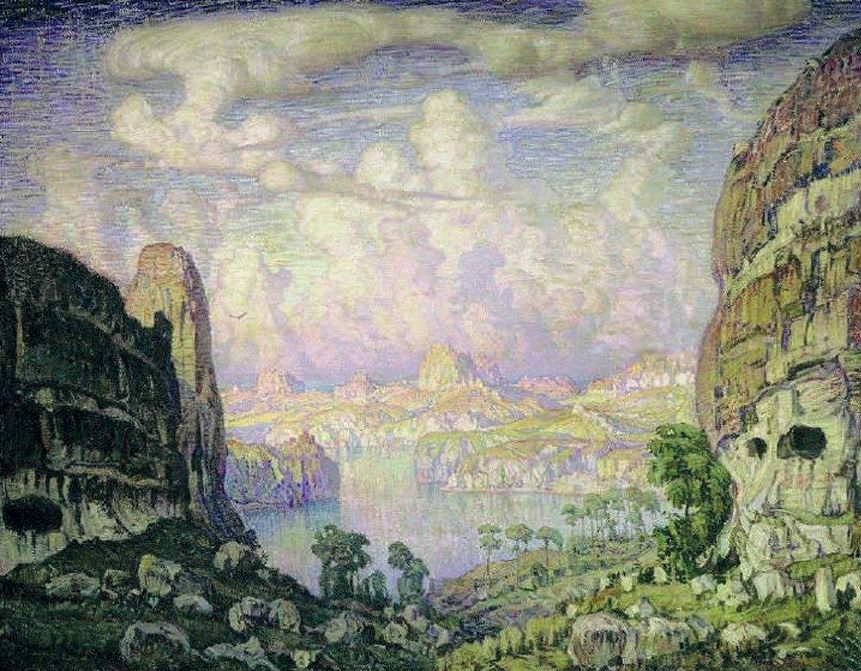
South Country. A cave town 1908

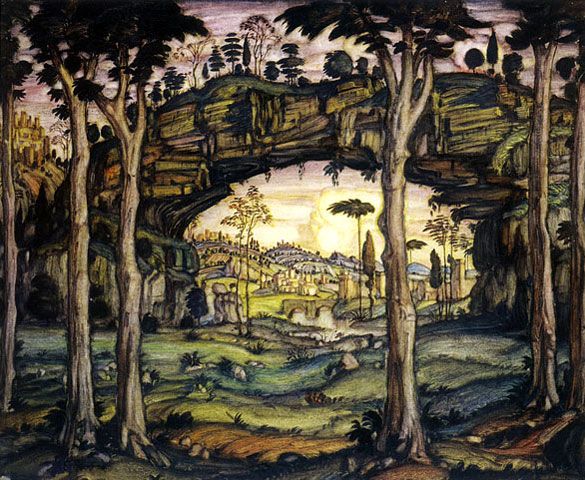
Italian landscape, 1911

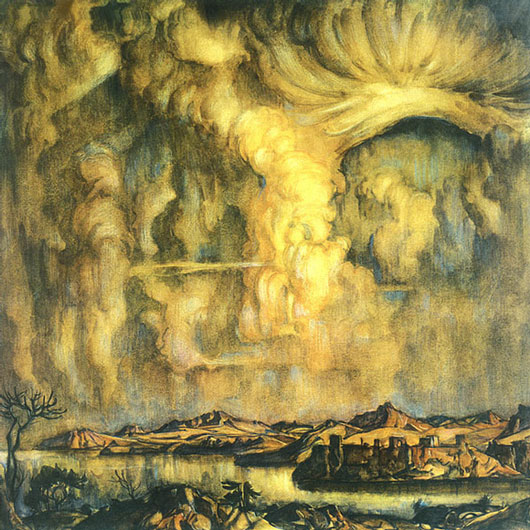
Cloud, 1920s

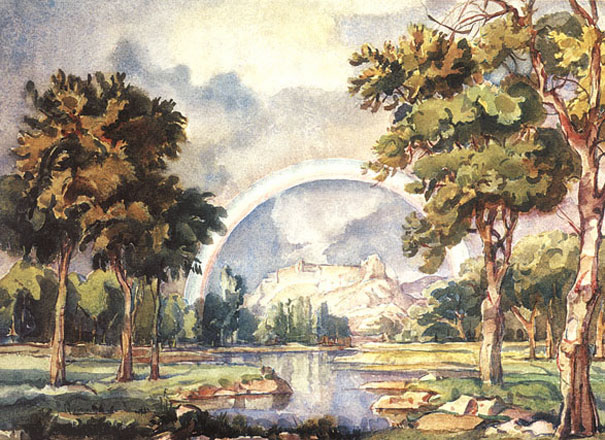
Rainbow, 1931

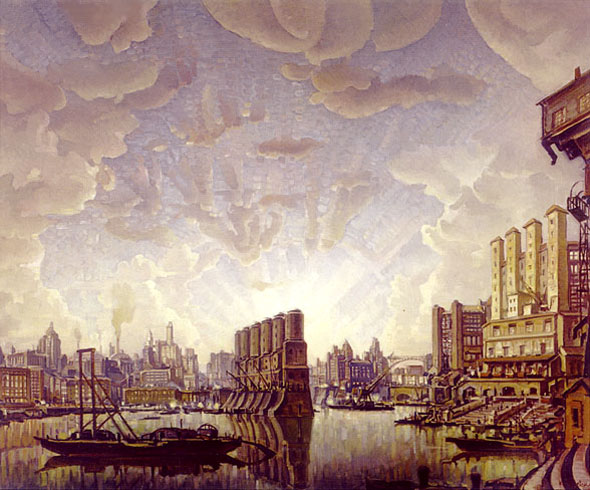
Port of an Imaginable City 1932

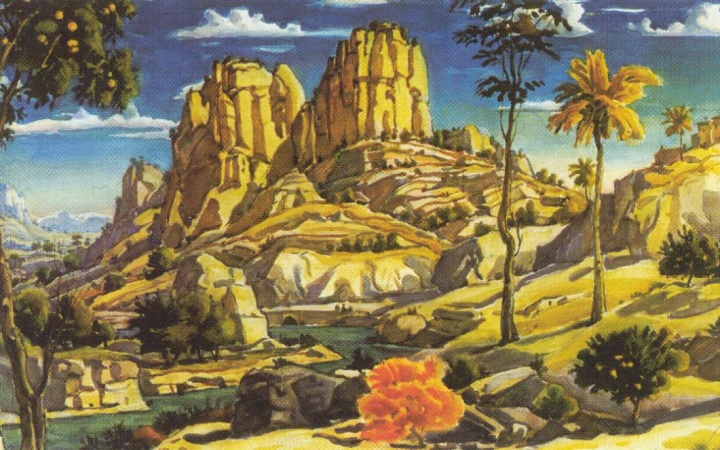
Recollection of Mantegna, 1942

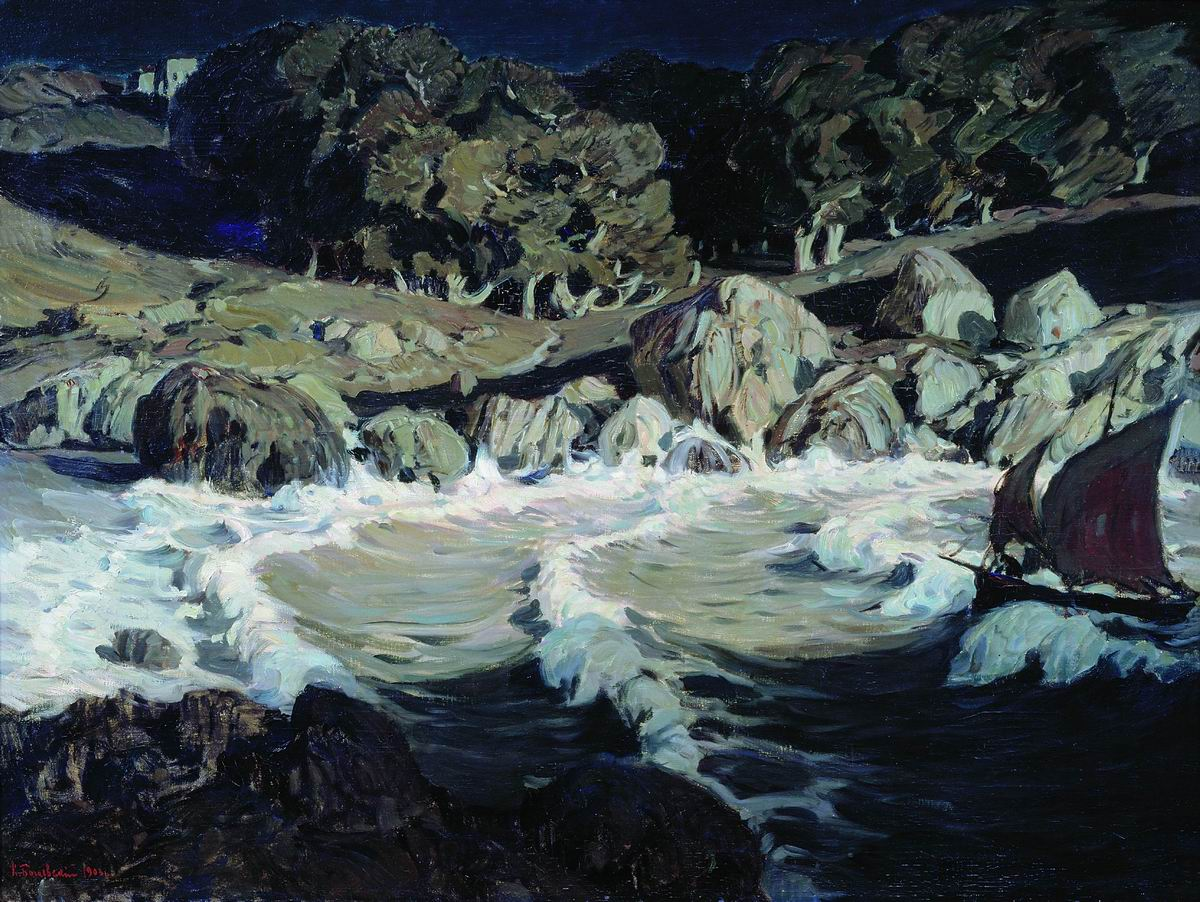
Night by the Sea, unknown
