= Simferopol Art Museum =

Art museum in Simferopol, Crimean

Coordinates: 44°57′26.244″N 34°5′29.357″E

The Simferopol State Art Museum
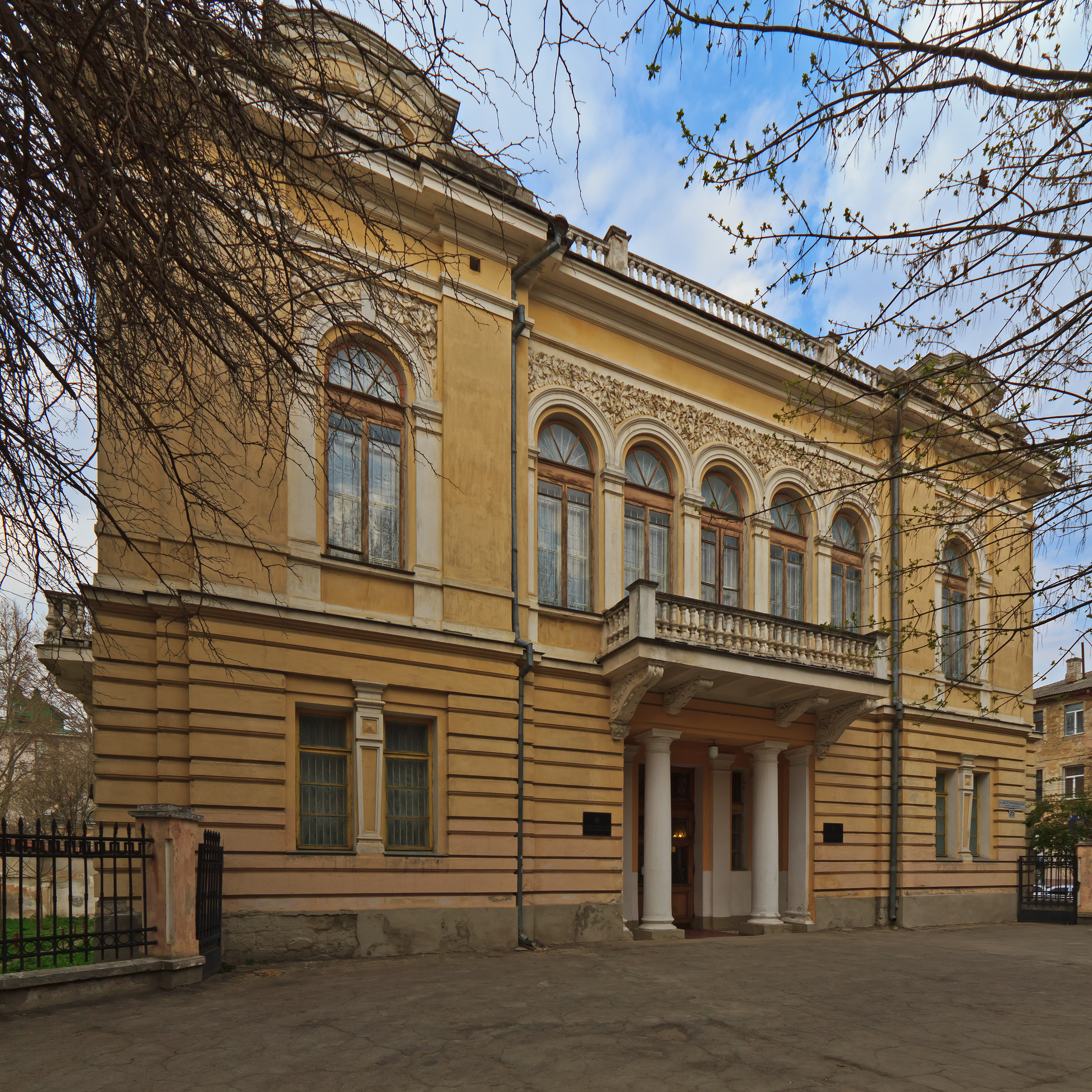
- Established: 1937
- Location: 35 Dolgorukovkaya St. Simferopol, Crimea
- Director: Larina Kudryashova
- Website: https://simhm.ru

Simferopol State Art Museum (Ukrainian: Сімферопольський художній музей, Russian: Симферопольский художественный музей) is an art museum located in the Crimean capital Simferopol.

Simferopol Art Museum was founded in 1937. There more than 6,000 artworks in its collection. Its address is Karl Libkneht str., 35.

Simferopol Art Museum has displayed looted art from Germany, claimed by the Suermondt-Ludwig-Museum in Aachen.

Before the start of World War II Museum is one of the largest collections of Western European art in the Soviet Union with more than 2,000 items owned. Almost the entire collection was destroyed in air raids during the war of the Germans in the Crimea. The Aachen pictures are to be regarded as compensation for their own losses.

Other prominent museums in Simferopol include the History Museum and the Country Museum (the Crimean Republican Museum of Local Lore).
