= December 1923 =

Month of 1923

<<	December 1923					>>
Su	Mo	Tu	We	Th	Fr	Sa
						1
2	3	4	5	6	7	8
9	10	11	12	13	14	15
16	17	18	19	20	21	22
23	24	25	26	27	28	29
30	31

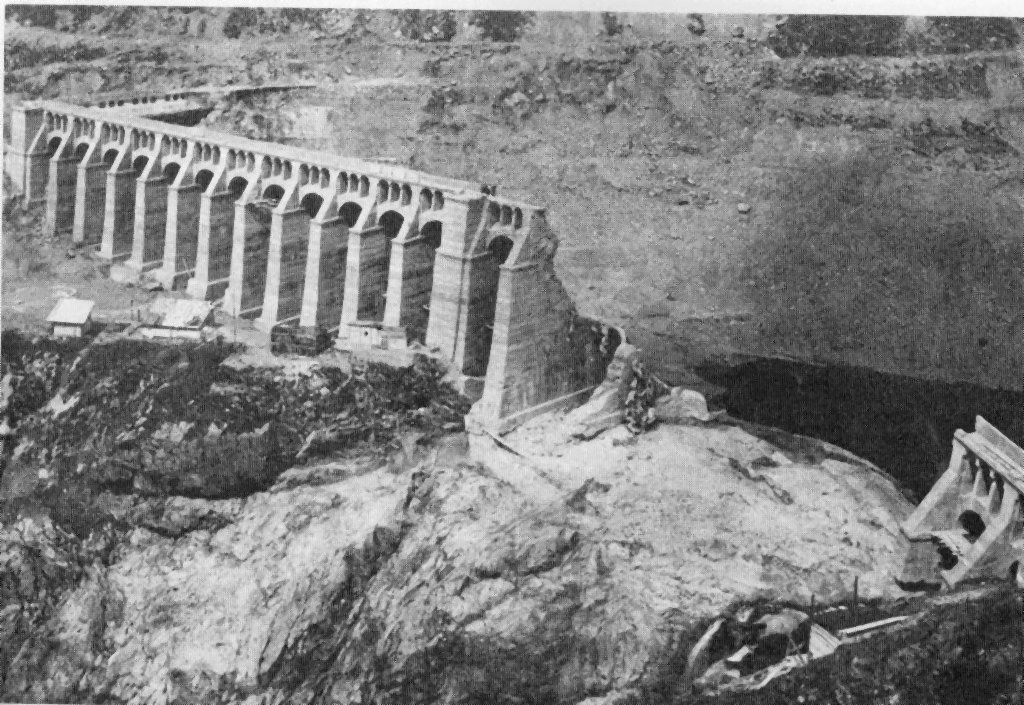
December 1, 1923: Collapse of Italy's Gleno Dam destroys two villages, kills 356 people

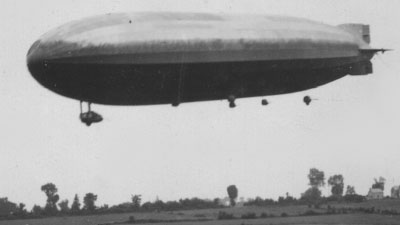
December 21, 1923: Midair explosion kills all 50 crew on French Navy dirigible Dixmude

The following events occurred in December 1923:

== December 1, 1923 (Saturday) ==
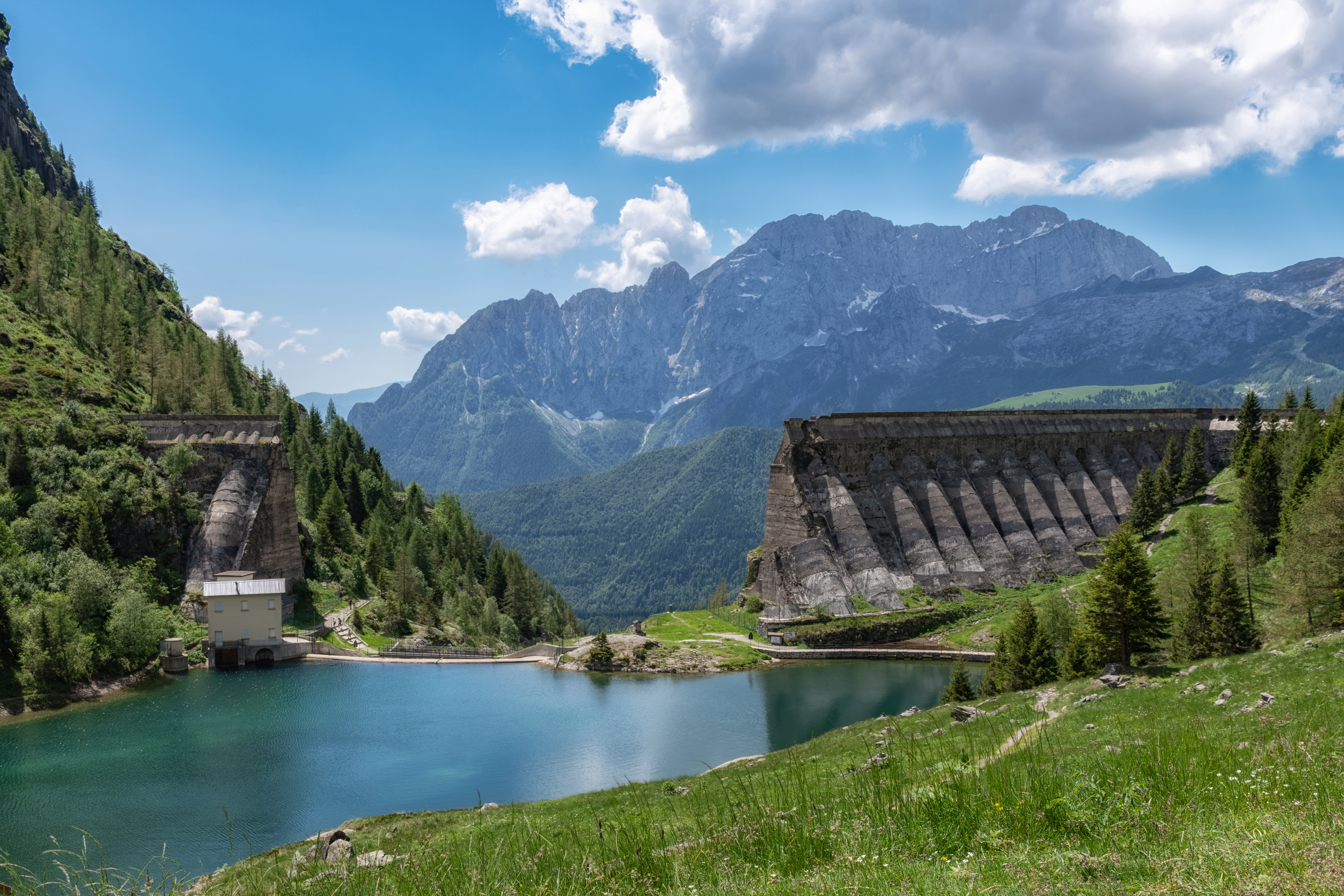
The ruins of the Gleno Dam in 2019

- The damburst of the Gleno Dam killed 356 people in the province of Bergamo, sweeping away people in the villages of Bueggio, Corna and Dezzo. Initial reports from the Associated Press said that of the 500 residents of Dezzo, only three survived.
- The Irish Free State began releasing captured Irregular fighters and political prisoners.
- Queen's University defeated Regina Rugby Club (now the Saskatchewan Roughriders, 54 to 0, to win the 11th Grey Cup of Canadian football.
- Born:
  - Dr. William F. House, American hearing specialist who invented the cochlear implant, the first device to restore hearing; in Kansas City, Missouri, United States (d. 2012)
  - Stansfield Turner, U.S. Navy Admiral and Director of Central Intelligence from 1977 to 1981; in Highland Park, Illinois, United States (d. 2018)
  - Ferenc Szusza, Hungarian soccer football forward for the national team; in Budapest, Kingdom of Hungary (present-day Hungary) (d. 2006)

== December 2, 1923 (Sunday) ==
- Elections for president and the legislative assembly and were held in Costa Rica. Former president Ricardo Jiménez Oreamuno (who had served from 1910 to 1914) won a plurality (46%) of the vote, not enough for an outright victory, but in voting for the 43 seats of the Asamblea Legislativa, Jiménez's Partido Republicano Nacional finished second (with 18 seats) to the Partido Agrícola of Alberto Echandi Montero (with 20). Ultimately, Jiménez would be selected president by the Asamblea, and third-place candidate Jorge Volio would become vice president.
- In Montevideo, Uruguay defeated Argentina, 2 to 0 to win the South American Championship of football. The format was tournament with the teams of Uruguay, Argentina, Paraguay and Brazil playing one game apiece against each other. After they both defeated Paraguay and Brazil, Uruguay and Argentina had records of 2 wins and no losses going into the final scheduled game.
- Born:
  - Maria Callas, American-born Greek soprano singer; as Maria Anna Cecilia Sophia Kalogeropoulou, in Manhattan, New York City, United States (d. 1977)
  - Hassia Levy-Agron, Israeli choreographer; as Hassia Levy, in Jerusalem, Mandatory Palestine (present-day Israel) (d. 2001)
- Died:
  - Tomás Bretón, 72, Spanish conductor and composer (b. 1850)
  - Henry Haversham Godwin-Austen, 89, British mountaineer and surveyor (b. 1834)

== December 3, 1923 (Monday) ==
- Joseph Conrad's novel The Rover was published.
- Seven coal miners at the Nunnery Colliery in England (at Darnall, South Yorkshire) were killed, and almost 50 others injured, when one of the ropes hauling a transport broke.

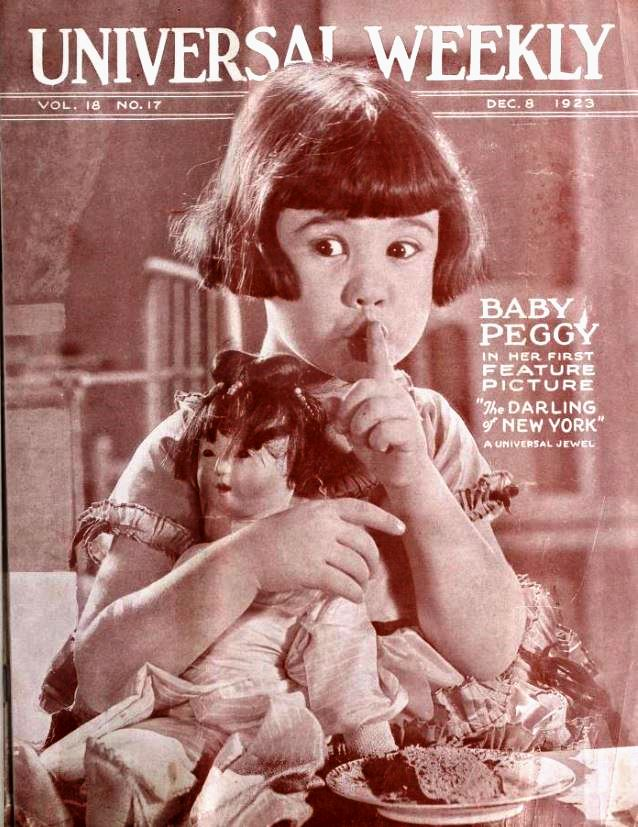
Baby Peggy

- The film The Darling of New York was released by Universal Pictures as the first movie to feature 5-year-old child actress Peggy-Jean Montgomery, billed as "Baby Peggy".
- Born:
  - Abe Pollin, American sports executive, owner of the Washington Bullets NBA team and the Washington Capitals NHL team; as Abraham Pollin, in Philadelphia, United States (d. 2009)
  - Dede Allen, American film editor; as Dorothea Allen, in Cleveland, United States (d. 2010)
  - Stjepan Bobek, Yugoslavian soccer football striker with 63 caps for the national team; in Zagreb, Kingdom of Yugoslavia (present-day Croatia) (d. 2010)
  - Moyra Fraser, Australian-born British actress known for As Time Goes By; in Sydney, Australia (d. 2009)
  - George M. Keller, American business executive who merged Standard Oil Company of California with Gulf Oil in 1984 to create the Chevron corporation; in Kansas City, Missouri, United States (d. 2008)
- Died: Elmer R. Gates, 63-64, American inventor who created the foam fire extinguisher and an improved electric iron (b. 1859)

== December 4, 1923 (Tuesday) ==
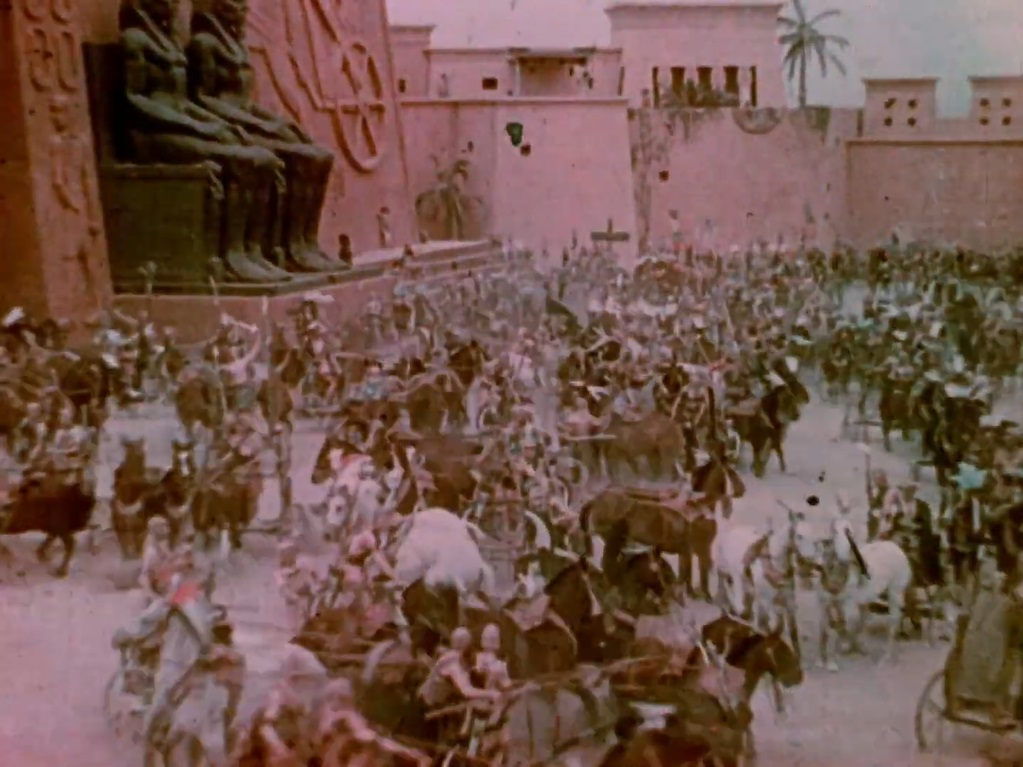
Portions of The Ten Commandments were in Technicolor

- The Cecil B. DeMille-directed epic film The Ten Commandments, the most popular movie of 1924, premiered at Grauman's Egyptian Theatre in Hollywood. One critic closed his review by saying, "'The Ten Commandments' is a picture that you cannot, by any stretch of the imagination, afford to miss. It offers splendors of photography and theatrical wonders hitherto unrevealed. It is, in fact, the greatest masterpiece, thus far, of pictoral artistry— and it has a lot to offer besides." Unlike DeMille's 1956 remake, the 1923 version had two parts, with a 50-minute prologue that recounted the events of the Book of Exodus before moving forward in time to the present (in the year 1923) for the remaining 85 minutes to show the different approaches to the ten commandments by members of the McTavish family.
- The Eveready Hour, the first commercially sponsored variety program in the history of broadcasting, premiered on the radio station WEAF in New York City. Within a year, the program would be transmitted by WEAF to additional stations, creating the "WEAF chain" radio network.
- Born:
  - Henry Rowan, American engineer and philanthropist for whom Rowan University is named; in Raphine, Virginia, United States (d. 2015)
  - Charles Keating, American financier convicted of fraud and whose activities led to the 1989 U.S. savings and loan crisis; in Cincinnati, United States (d. 2014)
  - Philip Slier, Dutch Jewish typesetter whose letters detailing life at a Nazi labor camp, Camp Molengoot, would be published 65 years after his death; in Amsterdam, Netherlands (d. 1943, killed at Sobibor extermination camp)
- Died:
  - Elena Apreleva, 77, Russian children's writer (b. 1846)
  - Maurice Barrès, 61, French novelist (b. 1862)

== December 5, 1923 (Wednesday) ==
- An insurrection began in Mexico as officers in five states — Veracruz, San Luis Potosí, Chihuahua, Michoacán and Tamaulipas — ousted the federal officials and installed their own replacements. General Guadalupe Sanchez and several other officers sent a message to President Álvaro Obregón declaring that "to contribute with our military honor to the conservation of peace and respect for the free will of the people, and to prevent the odious impositions which aim at destroying in its cradle our democratic form of government, we have resolved to assume the defense of the institutions offended so seriously by the government you represent." The rebellion was nominally led by Adolfo de la Huerta, but the rebels had little in common with each other besides opposition to Obregón.
- Six days before the conclusion of his term, Governor Edwin P. Morrow of the U.S. state of Kentucky commuted the death sentence of convicted murderer Steve McQueen, who had been a juvenile at the time of the crime. Pleas had been made to the governor's office from around the U.S. and Morrow said that he "heard the voice of God" in the requests.
- All 18 crew on the cargo steamboat T.W. Lake died when the ship sank off Lopez Island in northern Washington state.
- Born:
  - Eleanor Dapkus, American professional baseball player in the All-American Girls Professional Baseball League; in Chicago, United States (d. 2011)
  - Vladimir Tendryakov, Soviet author; in Makarovskaya, USSR (present-day Russia) (d. 1984)
- Died: William Mackenzie, 74, Canadian railway entrepreneur (b. 1849)

== December 6, 1923 (Thursday) ==
- Voting was held for the 615-seat British House of Commons after Prime Minister Stanley Baldwin had sought to increase the 344 to 142 majority held by his Conservative Party and for his protectionist tariff policy. Instead, the Tories lost 86 seats while the Labour Party of Ramsay MacDonald and the Liberal Party of H. H. Asquith gained 49 seats and 43 seats, respectively. With at least 308 seats needed for a majority, the Tory share fell to 258 seats, 50 short of control, while Labour (with 191) and Liberal (with 158) had a combined opposition force of 349.
- Winston Churchill was defeated by Labour candidate Frederick Pethick-Lawrence in the constituency of Leicester West
- Liberal incumbent Francis Dyke Acland retained his seat for the Tiverton constituency by only three votes, 12,303 to 12,300 over his second cousin, Conservative Gilbert Acland-Troyte.
- Gregory Zervoudakis, the Eastern Orthodox Metropolitan of Chalcedon, was elected as the Church leader as Patriarch of Constantinople. He took the ecclesiastical name Gregory VII, and served less than a year before his sudden death from a heart attack.
- The Soviet Russian afternoon newspaper Vechernyaya Moskva published its first issue, and continues to be published on weekday evenings, Monday through Friday, past its 100th anniversary.
- U.S. President Calvin Coolidge made his first State of the Union address. The speech was broadcast on nationwide radio.
- The Chamber of Deputies of France voted, 408 to 127, to adopt the electoral reform bill proposed by the government of Prime Minister Raymond Poincaré. After a previous measure had been failed to win support, 270 to 295, Poincaré presented the question again as a vote of confidence in his government.
- Born:
  - Vasant Sabnis, Indian playwright and screenwriter; in Pandharpur, Bombay presidency, British India (present-day Maharashtra state, India) (d. 2002)
  - Urbano Tavares Rodrigues, Portuguese novelist; in Lisbon, Portugal (d. 2013)
  - Lloyd Gomez, American serial killer who committed nine murders of homeless men over one year in 1950 and 1951; in Caliente, Nevada, United States (d. 1953, executed)
- Died: Friedrich Rosenbach, 80, German microbiologist known for his studies of staphylococcus variations (b. 1842) Rosenbach's disease was named for him after he discovered its etiology from contaminated seafood.

== December 7, 1923 (Friday) ==
- Adolfo de la Huerta, governor of the Mexican state of Sonora and former President of Mexico, joined the delahuertista rebellion against the government of President Álvaro Obregón.
- Born: Ted Knight, American TV actor known for The Mary Tyler Moore Show and for Too Close for Comfort; as Tadeusz Konopka, in Terryville, Connecticut, United States (d. 1986)
- Died:
  - Sir Frederick Treves, 70, British surgeon known for his pioneering treatment of appendicitis and for saving the life of King Edward VII in 1902 (b. 1853)
  - Akshay Kumar Sen, 68-69, Indian Bengali mystic, poet and author (b. 1854)
  - Gustave Eiffel, 91, French civil engineer (b. 1832)

== December 8, 1923 (Saturday) ==
- The Reichstag voted, 313 to 18, to pass an enabling act, giving Chancellor Wilhelm Marx the power to implement emergency economic and welfare measures.
- Rebels in Mexico captured Xalapa, the capital of the state of Veracruz, and took 200 prisoners, including Governor Angel Casarin. With the fall of Veracruz state, the insurgents began their advance toward Mexico City.
- After the U.S. Senate had declined to ratify the Treaty of Versailles, U.S. Secretary of State Charles Evans Hughes and Germany's Ambassador Otto Wiedfeldt signed the Treaty of Friendship, Commerce and Consular Relations between Germany and the United States of America. The two nations would both ratify the treaty in 1925.
- The Bertolt Brecht play Baal premiered in Leipzig at the Altes Theater. The play caused such a scandal that the Mayor of Leipzig canceled any further performances.
- Born:
  - Pio Taofinuʻu, Samoan Roman Catholic Cardinal and Archbishop of Samoa-Apia, who became the first Polynesian Catholic Cardinal in 1923; in Falealupo, Savaiʻi island, Samoa (d. 2006)
  - Michael Hargrave, British physician who wrote of his experiences in the liberation of the Bergen-Belsen concentration camp; in Simla, British India (present-day Shimla, India) (d. 1974)
- Died: John William Brodie-Innes, 75, Scottish occult novelist known for his 1915 work The Devil's Mistress (b. 1848). He was a leading member of the Amen-Ra Temple of the Hermetic Order of the Golden Dawn.

== December 9, 1923 (Sunday) ==
- The Convention and Statute on the International Régime of Maritime Ports was signed in Geneva by seafaring members of the League of Nations, providing that all commercial ships would have freedom of access to maritime ports without discrimination based upon the ship's maritime flag. The treaty would enter into force on July 29, 1926.
- A train accident at 1:30 a.m. in Forsyth, New York killed 9 passengers.
- Born:
  - Wolfgang Harich, East German journalist and philosopher, imprisoned for eight years for counterrevolutionary plotting; in Königsberg, Germany (present-day Kaliningrad, Russia) (d. 1995)
  - Elliot Valenstein, American neuroscientist and expert on deep brain stimulation and control; in New York City, United States (d. 2023)
- Died:
  - Meggie Albanesi, 24, British actress; died of an intestinal obstruction (b. 1899)
  - Bill Donovan, 47, American baseball player; killed in the Forsyth train accident.
  - Uttamlal Trivedi, 50, Indian Gujarati language writer (b. 1872)

== December 10, 1923 (Monday) ==
- National Dairy Products Corporation, which would become the leading manufacturer of dairy products and then a worldwide food conglomerate, was founded by a merger of Thomas H. McInerney's Hydrox Corporation and Edward E. Rieck's Rieck—McJunkin Dairy Company. As of 2023, the company is now called Kraft Heinz.
- The 1923 Nobel Prizes were awarded. The recipients were Robert A. Millikan of the United States for Physics, Fritz Pregl of Austria (Chemistry), Frederick Banting and John Macleod of Canada (Medicine) and William Butler Yeats of the Irish Free State (Literature). The Peace Prize was not awarded.
- The U.S. Supreme Court decided the case of Rooker v. Fidelity Trust Co., holding that only the U.S. Supreme Court could review decisions of individual U.S. state courts, and that federal district courts or circuit appellate courts lacked jurisdiction to review state decisions.
- King Victor Emmanuel III of Italy prorogued parliament until January at the request of Benito Mussolini.
- Turkey and Albania signed a treaty of friendship.
- Born: Lucía Hiriart, wife of Chilean dictator Augusto Pinochet; as María Lucía Hiriart Rodríguez, in Antofagasta, Chile (d. 2021)

== December 11, 1923 (Tuesday) ==
- Stanley Baldwin decided to remain as Prime Minister until the return of parliament in January when he would face a confidence vote.
- Puebla, Mexico's fourth largest city, was taken by rebels led by former President Adolfo de la Huerta.
- The Board of Regents of the University of California system voted to turn its Southern Branch, located in Los Angeles, from a three-year junior college into a four-year program authorized to award a bachelor's degree to students, beginning with the 1924–1925 academic year. The first Southern Branch bachelor's degree would be awarded on June 12, 1925, and on February 1, 1927, the institution would be renamed the University of California at Los Angeles (UCLA).
- Born: Luis Berenguer, Spanish novelist; in Ferrol, Spain (d. 1979)
- Died: John R. Rathom, 55, Australian-born American reporter and editor of The Providence Journal, known for his dubious and sometimes fraudulent stories (b. 1868)

== December 12, 1923 (Wednesday) ==
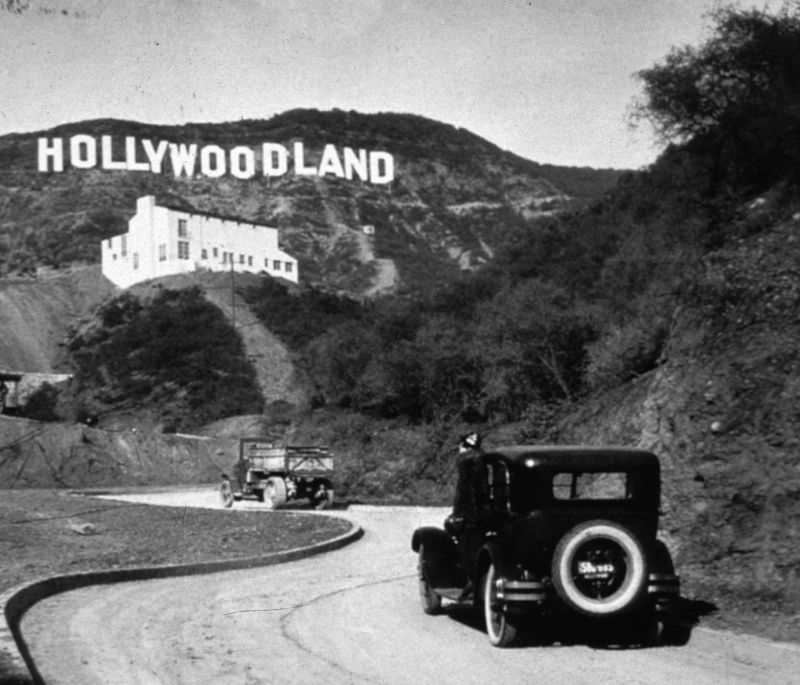
HOLLYWOODLAND

- The famous Hollywood Sign in the U.S. state of California, with letters 45 feet (14 m) high and stretching across a mountain above Hollywood, California, was completed by S. H. Woodruff, the developer of the new "Hollywoodland" subdivision. The completion of the sign, which initially spelled out the 13 letters of the subdivision, was announced in an advertisement by Electrical Products Corporation, with the declaration "We thank you, Mr. Woodruff, for having given us the opportunity to engineer and install this great electrical sign," and adding, "May your expenditure be appreciated by those who love to see Los Angeles lead in enterprise and really 'big' things."
- Italy's first airline, Aero Espresso Italiana, was founded. It would begin offering passenger service in 1926.
- German Finance Minister Hans Luther announced that the country had exhausted its gold reserves and domestic credit, and would need a foreign loan to continue functioning.
- Born:
  - Bob Barker, American media personality and game show host, best known for hosting The Price Is Right; as Robert Barker, in Darrington, Washington, United States (d. 2023)
  - John Pulman, English professional snooker player and World Snooker Champion from 1957 to 1968; as Herbert John Pulman, in Teignmouth, Devonshire, England (d. 1998)
  - Sister Emahoy Tsegué-Maryam Guèbrou, Ethiopian nun and musical composer; as Yewubdar Gebru, in Addis Ababa, Ethiopian Empire (present-day Ethiopia) (d. 2023)
  - Og Mandino, American motivational author known for The Greatest Salesman in the World; as Augustine Mandino, in Framingham, Massachusetts, United States (d. 1996)
- Died:
  - Raymond Radiguet, 20, French novelist and poet; died of tuberculosis (b. 1903)
  - S. Kasturi Ranga Iyengar, 63, Indian independence activist and editor of The Hindu (b. 1859)

== December 13, 1923 (Thursday) ==
- Lord Alfred Douglas was sentenced to six months in prison for libelling Winston Churchill. Douglas had printed a story in his newspaper claiming that Churchill was paid off by Ernest Cassel to release a false report about the Battle of Jutland so stocks would go down and a group of Jews could turn a profit when they went up again.
- Born:
  - Philip W. Anderson, American theoretical physicist and Nobel Prize laureate; in Indianapolis, United States (d. 2020)
  - Larry Doby, American professional baseball player and the first African American player in the American League; in Camden, South Carolina, United States (d. 2003)
  - Antoni Tàpies, Spanish Catalan painter, sculptor and art theorist; in Barcelona, Spain (d. 2012)
  - Cardinal Edward Clancy, Australian Roman Catholic priest and Archbishop of Sydney from 1983 until his death; in Lithgow, New South Wales, Australia (d. 2001)
  - Lady Margaret Fortescue, British landowner and heiress; in Ebrington, Gloucestershire, England (d. 2013)
- Died:
  - Lawrence Sperry, 30, American aviation pioneer who invented the autopilot and the artificial horizon for airplanes; killed when his Verville-Sperry M-1 Messenger crashed into the English Channel (b.1892).
  - Maie Ash, 35, British stage actress and comedian (b. 1888)
  - Théophile Steinlen, 64, Swiss-born French painter and printmaker (b. 1859)

== December 14, 1923 (Friday) ==
- A 5.3 magnitude earthquake killed more than 300 people in Colombia and Ecuador after striking near the border town of Ipiales in the Nariño Department. The tremor destroyed the village of Cumbal, and the survivors moved to another location.
- Wincenty Witos resigned as prime minister of Poland along with his entire cabinet.
- Born:
  - Gerard Reve, Dutch novelist; as Gerard van het Reve, in Amsterdam, Netherlands (d. 2006)
  - Sully Boyar, American actor; as Irving Boyar, in Brooklyn, New York City, United States (d. 2001)
  - David Zingg, American and Brazilian photographer and journalist; in Montclair, New Jersey, United States (d. 2000)

== December 15, 1923 (Saturday) ==
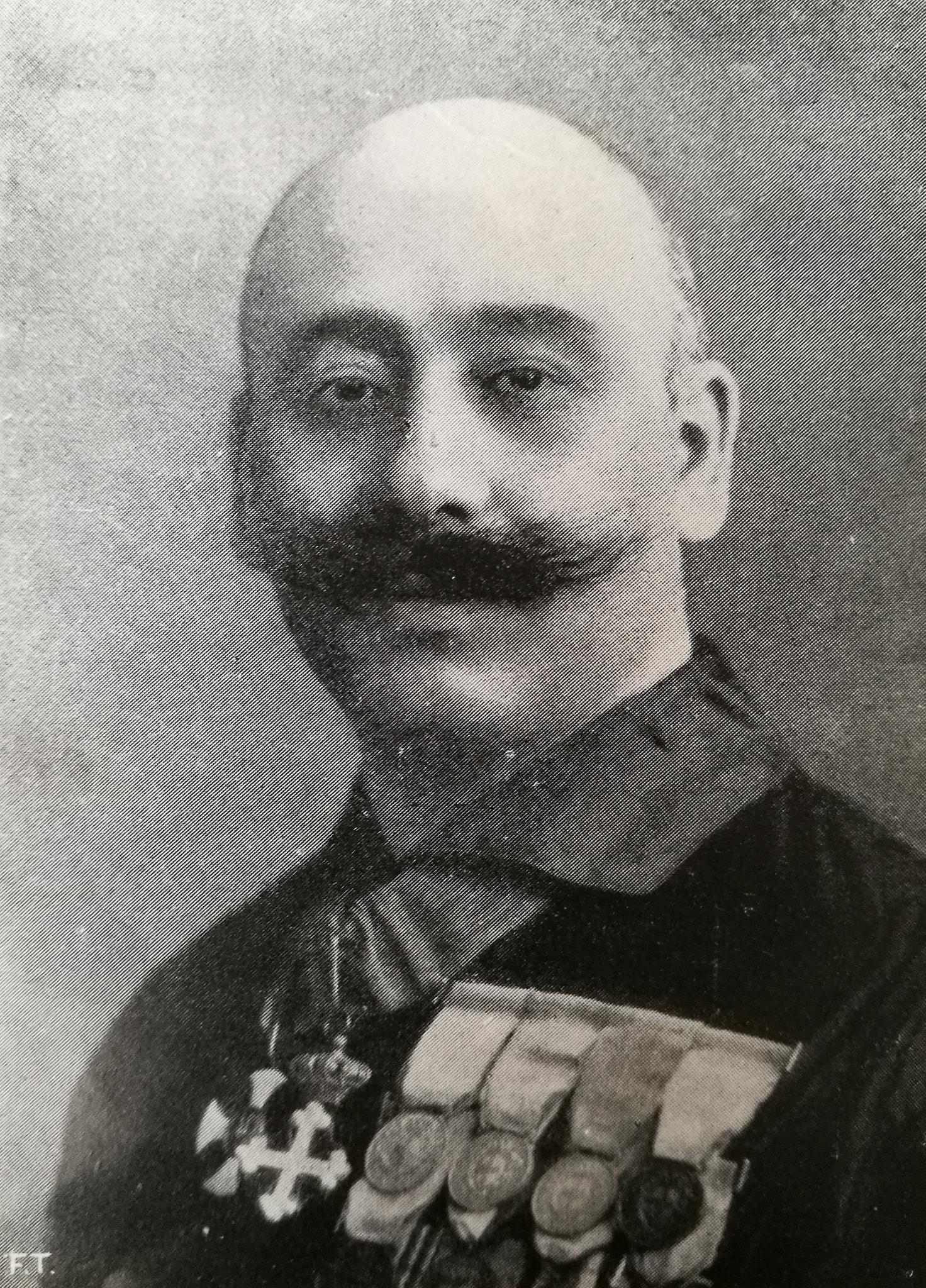
Commandant-General De Vecchi

- Captain Cesare Maria De Vecchi, the Commandant-General of the Blackshirts, the Italian Fascist Party's paramilitary wing, arrived in Mogadiscio (now Mogadishu) to take office as the Fascist colonial governor of Italian Somaliland and began a program of conquering the existing sultanates in the more remote parts of the northeast African land.
- The wreck of the Norwegian steamer Runa killed 18 of its 23 crew after the vessel was wrecked on the coast of the U.S. state of North Carolina and sank in a few minutes. While two lifeboats were launched, the six occupants of one of the boats froze to death before they could be rescued.
- Turkey and Hungary signed a treaty of friendship.
- Inventor Eric Mackintosh applied for the patent for the Celestion electric loudspeaker system for radio.
- Six days after ending the 1923 NFL season in first place with an 11-0-1 record, the NFL champion Canton Bulldogs defeated the non-NFL Frankford Yellow Jackets in a challenge game against in Philadelphia. Frankford, not an NFL team, billed themselves as "champions of the East" with a 9-1-2 record against teams in the "Anthracite League" and against four other NFL teams. Described in the U.S. as the pro football championship, the game was won by Canton, 3 to 0, in the final two minutes of play on a field goal from future Pro Football Hall of Famer Pete Henry.
- The Jules Romains play Knock ou le Triomphe de la médecine ("Knock, or the Triumph of Medicine") was first performed in Paris at the Théâtre des Champs-Élysées. The title was derived from the name of the main character, Dr. Knock.
- Born:
  - Freeman Dyson, British theoretical physicist and mathematician known for the Dyson sphere, the Dyson's transform, and Dyson's eternal intelligence; in Crowthorne, Berkshire, England (d. 2020)
  - Jimmy Carter, American professional boxer and world lightweight champion three times between 1951 and 1954; as James Walter Carter, in Aiken, South Carolina, United States (d. 1994)
  - Basanta Kumari Patnaik, Indian Odia language novelist; in Bhanjanagar, Bihar and Orissa Province, British India (present-day Odisha state, India) (d. 2013)
- Died: Joe Pullen, 40, African American tenant farmer; lynched by white citizens of Drew, Mississippi, but not before he killed at least three members of the lynch mob and wounded several others (b. c. 1883)

== December 16, 1923 (Sunday) ==
- Voting was held in Greece for the 395 seats of the Ethnikís Synélefsis. The Liberal Party of Prime Minister Stylianos Gonatas, running on a platform of abolishing the monarchy, more than doubled its share of seats, from 118 to 250, and won control of the parliament. The new Democratic Union and Democratic Liberals won 120 seats.
- Mexican rebels captured Cuautla, Morelos.
- The wreck of the American lumber freighter C. A. Smith killed 11 of its crew after their lifeboat capsized while it was being lowered into the water after the ship struck rocks at the entrance to Coos Bay in the U.S. state of Oregon.
- Born:
  - Jim Forbes, Australian politician, president of the Liberal Party of Australia from 1982 to 1985, who served simultaneously for three months as Minister for the Army (1963-1966) and Minister for the Navy (1963-1964), Health Minister (1966-1971) and Immigration Minister (1971-1972); as Alexander James de Burgh Forbes, in Hobart, Tasmania, Australia (d. 2019)
  - Jo-Carroll Dennison, American model and actress, crowned Miss America in 1942; in Florence, Arizona, United States (d. 2021)
  - Gerald Glaskin, Australian novelist; in Perth, Western Australia, Australia (d. 2000)
- Died: Rabbi Albert Katz, 65, Polish-born German Jewish author and journalist who served as the chief editor of the magazine Allgemeine Zeitung des Judentums (b. 1858)

== December 17, 1923 (Monday) ==
- The kingdom of Thailand officially adopted the metric system, although not wholly abandoning the traditional Thai units of measure. Among the units lost were the khuep [25 centimetres (9.8 in)] and the chang [1.2 kilograms (2.6 lb)]. The thanan was equivalent to one liter.
- The Gregorian Calendar came into effect in the Armenian Apostolic Church all over the world, with the notable exception of the Armenian Patriarchate of Jerusalem, by a decree of Catholicos Gevorg V Soureniants dated November 6 (O.S.).
- Agreement was reached in Britain on the formation of the Imperial Air Transport Company, soon to be known as Imperial Airways.
- Subhi Bey Barakat was elected as the first, and only President of the Syrian Federation.
- American boxer Johnny Dundee regained the world junior lightweight championship, defeating Jack Bernstein (who had defeated him on May 30) in a split decision after a bout at Madison Square Garden in New York.
- The Tod Browning-directed crime film White Tiger was released.
- Born: Jaroslav Pelikan, American historian of Christianity; in Akron, Ohio, United States (d. 2006)
- Died: Joseph Orpen, 95, British colonial administrator and anthropologist (b. 1828)

== December 18, 1923 (Tuesday) ==
- Farmer James D. Cummings and draftsman J. Earl McLeod, both of Washington, Kansas, filed the patent application for their invention, the bulldozer. U.S. Patent No. 1,522,378 would be granted on January 6, 1925. In the patent application, they wrote "Our invention is an attachment for tractors by the use of which the surface of the ground may be easily brought into a level condition. The device is intended more particularly for filling ditches in which pipe lines have been laid but is capable of use as a grader and for other purposes."
- The Tangier Protocol was signed in Paris by representatives of France, Spain and the United Kingdom, creating the Tangier International Zone in Morocco. The Zone would be abolished in 1956 upon the independence of Morocco.
- Andrew Volstead told a law enforcement conference in Minnesota that the American people were giving up their opposition to Prohibition and that the act bearing his name would never be amended or repealed.
- Born: Field Marshal Edwin Bramall, British Army officer, served as the Chief of the Defence Staff from 1982 to 1985; in Tonbridge, Kent, England (d. 2019)

== December 19, 1923 (Wednesday) ==
- King George II of Greece and Queen Consort Elisabeth left the country in compliance with the Greek government's request that they leave temporarily pending settlement by the National Assembly on the future form of government. They went to Elisabeth's home country of Romania.
- Wincenty Witos, the recently appointed prime minister of Poland, formed a new government.
- The French Chamber of Deputies granted Marie Curie an annual pension of 40,000 francs.
- A Russian firing squad at the Soviet Union's first Gulag, the Solovki Prison Camp, executed six political prisoners who had been protesting conditions on the Solovetsky Islands.
- Born: Gordon Jackson, Scottish actor; in Glasgow, Scotland (d. 1990)
- Died: Sun Meiyao, 25, Chinese bandit leader who masterminded the May 6 Lincheng Outrage; executed on orders of the Governor of Shandong Province (b. 1898)

== December 20, 1923 (Thursday) ==
- The English language version of Leo Fall's three-act operetta Madame Pompadour, translated from German by Harry Graham and adapted for British audiences by Frederick Lonsdale, premiered at Daly's Theatre for the first of 469 performances.
- The League of Nations implemented an economic reconstruction program for Hungary.
- The Krupp munitions works fired workers who refused to continue to work a 10-hour work day.
- The John Ford-directed film Hoodman Blind was released.
- Born: Charita Bauer, American radio and TV actress known for The Aldrich Family and later for The Guiding Light; in Newark, New Jersey, United States (d. 1985)

== December 21, 1923 (Friday) ==
- The French airship Dixmude exploded and crashed into the Mediterranean during a thunderstorm. All 50 on board were killed in the worst air disaster in history to that point. The dirigible's fate was not immediately known at the time. One body, identified as lieutenant commander Du Plessis de Grenandan on the Dixmude, was found on December 26.
- The Nepal–Britain Treaty was signed at the Singha Durbar, Nepal's royal palace in Kathmandu, by British envoy W. F. T. O'Connor on behalf of King George V of the United Kingdom, and Nepal's Prime Minister, Field Marshal Chandra Shumsher, on behalf of King Tribhuvan. The British Empire acknowledged Nepal's right to conduct its own foreign and domestic affairs.
- Mexico's federal army, commanded by General Eugenio Martinez, recaptured the city of Puebla from the De la Huerta rebels. The government estimated that it lost 150 federales, while more than 2,000 rebels had been killed in battle and another 2,000 taken prisoner.
- Charles G. Dawes was named head of the commission to investigate Germany's capacity to pay war reparations.
- Born:
  - Thich Tri Quang, South Vietnamese Buddhist monk who led the Buddhist uprisings of 1963 and 1966; as Pham Quang, in Diem Dien, Quang Binh province, French Indochina (present-day Vietnam) (d. 2019)
  - Joseph H. Flom, American corporate lawyer and specialist in mergers and acquisitions; in Baltimore, United States (d. 2011)
- Died: Frank I. Cobb, 54, American editor of the New York World; died of cancer (b. 1869)

== December 22, 1923 (Saturday) ==
- Stylianos Gonatas resigned as Prime Minister of Greece but said he would stay on until a new leader was elected by the National Assembly.
- Hjalmar Schacht was appointed head of the Reichsbank.
- Born: Etta Hulme, American editorial cartoonist; as Etta Parks, in Somerville, Texas, United States (d. 2014)
- Died: Georg Luger, 74, German firearms designer known for the Luger pistol (b. 1849)

== December 23, 1923 (Sunday) ==
- In the burial chamber of Tutankhamun's tomb, the heavy outer canopy over the sarcophagus was successfully removed.
- Born: James Stockdale, U.S. Navy Admiral, prisoner of war, and 1992 vice presidential candidate; in Abingdon, Illinois, United States (d. 2005)
- Died: Ivan Pohitonov, 73, Ukrainian painter (b. 1850)

== December 24, 1923 (Monday) ==
- The economic feasibility of rural electrification in the United States was demonstrated in a joint project of the University of Minnesota and the Northern States Power Company as nine farms in Goodhue County, Minnesota, received electricity for the first time.
- At Washington, D.C., the tradition of the National Christmas Tree was inaugurated in the U.S. at the conclusion of a 100-member choir from the city's First Congregational Church at the South Portico of the White House. At 5:00 in the evening, U.S. President Calvin Coolidge pressed a button and turned on 2,500 electric bulbs.
- In a Christmas message, German Chancellor Wilhelm Marx stated that the government was willing to "fulfill reparations to the limit of our capacity," but made an international appeal to "give us peace, take away the unfair sanctions and oppositions, and give us a chance to work and live and then Germany will save her finances and pay reparations accordingly."
- Born:
  - Dorothea M. Ross, Canadian-born American pediatric psychologist; in Victoria, British Columbia, Canada (d. 2019)
  - George Patton IV, U.S. Army Major General; in Boston, United States (d. 2004)
  - Ernest Briggs, American abstract expressionist painter; in San Diego, United States (d. 1984)
- Died: Alexander Neverov, 37, Soviet Russian novelist known for his book, Tashkent— The City of Bread (Tashkent— Gorod Chlebniy); died of heart failure (b. 1886)

== December 25, 1923 (Tuesday) ==
- The brand-new Imperial Theatre opened on Broadway with the debut of the musical comedy Mary Jane McKane, with music by Oscar Hammerstein II and lyrics by Vincent Youmans.
- U.S. Patent No. 1,478,704 was granted to the estate of the late German optician Heinrich Erfle for his invention, the first wide-angle eyepiece for telescopes and binoculars. Erfle had died from blood poisoning more than eight months earlier, on April 8, at the age of 39. The application had been filed on August 13, 1921.
- Born:
  - Sonya Olschanezky, German World War II resistance fighter; in Chemnitz, Germany (d. 1944, executed)
  - Maurice Fingercwajg, Polish-born French World War II resistance fighter; in Warsaw, Poland (d. 1944, executed)
  - Satyananda Saraswati, Indian yoga teacher, founder of the Bihar School of Yoga; in Almora, British India (present-day India) (d. 2009)
  - Wendell Chino, American Indigenous leader and President of the Mescalero Apache Nation from 1964 until his death; in Mescalero, New Mexico, United States (d. 1998)
  - Muzharul Islam, Bangladeshi architect; in Murshidabad, Bengal province, British India (present-day West Bengal state, India) (d. 2012)
  - René Girard, French philosopher and anthropologist; in Avignon, Vaucluse département, France (d. 2015)

== December 26, 1923 (Wednesday) ==
- France's budget for 1924 showed a surplus of 568 million francs.
- Ships, planes and camel riders searched the Mediterranean and North African coastline looking for any trace of the Dixmude, though expectations of finding survivors were low. On December 29, the search for more survivors halted and the French government began sending condolences to the families of the victims.
- A fire at one of the buildings of the Illinois State Hospital for the Insane in Chicago killed 14 patients and a nurse.
- Born: Victor Owusu, Ghanaian lawyer and politician, served as the Attorney General of Ghana from 1966 to 1969 and 1971 to 1972, and as Minister for Foreign Affairs from 1969 to 1971; in Agona, Gold Coast (present-day Ghana) (d. 2000)
- Died: Dietrich Eckart, 55, German journalist and early member of the Nazi Party; died of a heart attack (b. 1868)

== December 27, 1923 (Thursday) ==
- An assassination attempt was made against Japan's Prince Regent Hirohito when a 24-year-old communist student, Daisuke Namba, fired a pistol and shattered the window of Hirohito's automobile as it was passing through the Toranomon district of Tokyo. The Prince Regent, who had been on his way to the opening of the Imperial Parliament, was unhurt. Prime Minister Yamamoto Gonnohyōe and his cabinet resigned after taking responsibility for the lack of security for the Emperor.
- Mexican government forces routed rebels in northern Jalisco.
- The American freight steamship Conejos sank in the Black Sea with the loss of all 37 sailors.

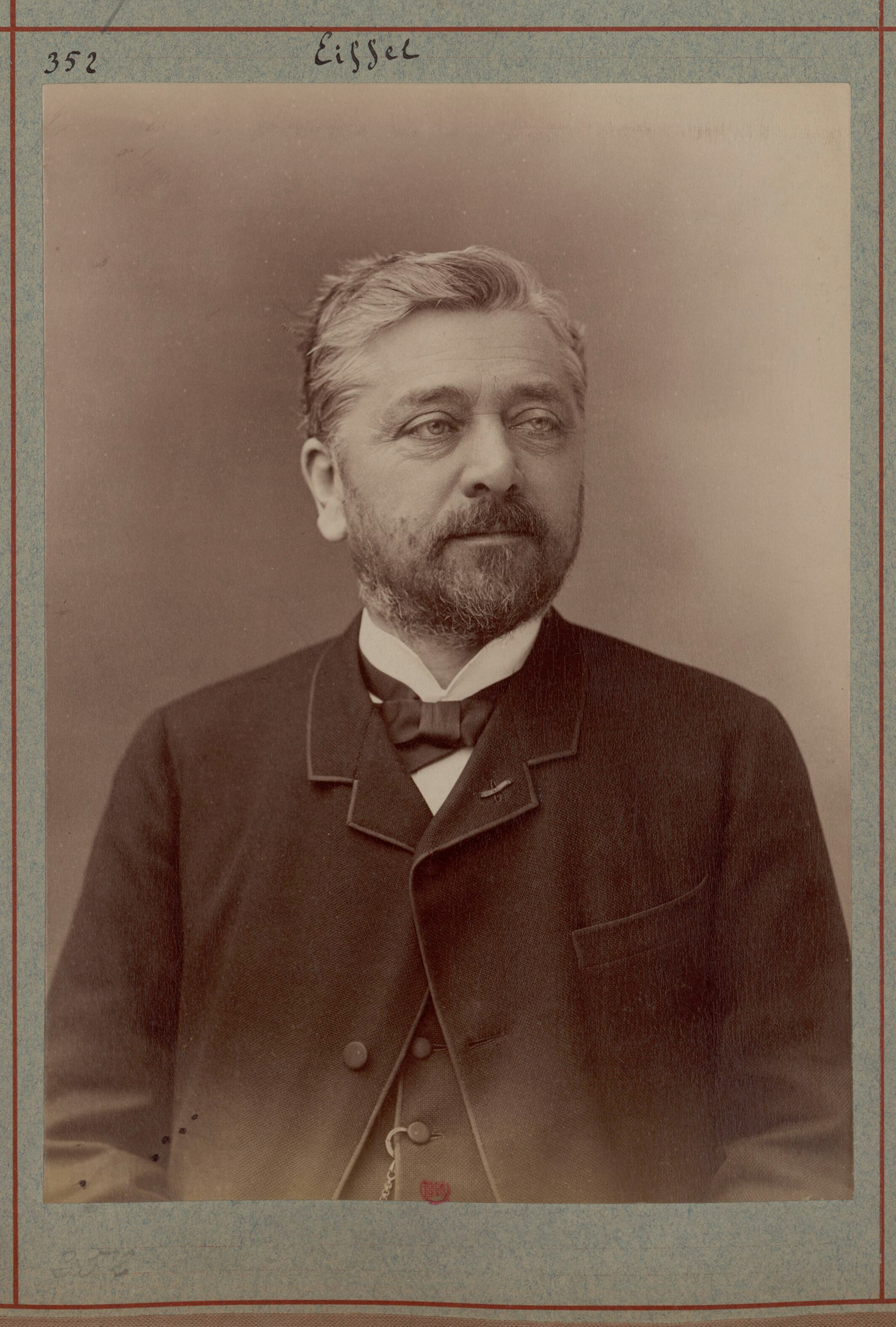
Gustave Eiffel

- Born: Lucas Mangope, South African teacher and politician, President of the nominally independent bantustan of Bophuthatswana from 1977 to 1994, and served Chief Minister of Bophuthatswana from 1972 to 1977; as Kgosi Lucas Manyane Mangope, in Motswedi, Transvaal Province, Union of South Africa (present-day South Africa) (d. 2018)
- Died:
  - Gustave Eiffel, 91, French engineer and architect best known designing the Eiffel Tower (b. 1832)
  - Michael J. Owens, 64, American inventor who created the first machine for the mass production of glass bottles (b. 1859)

== December 28, 1923 (Friday) ==
- The George Bernard Shaw play Saint Joan premiered at the Garrick Theatre on Broadway in New York City. Actress Winifred Lenihan appeared as Joan of Arc. The West End premier in London took place three months later at the New Theatre with Sybil Thorndike as St. Joan.
- Born:
  - Nicolás Moreno, Mexican landscape painter; in Mexico City, Mexico (d. 2012)
  - Josef Hassid, Polish violinist; in Suwalki, Poland (d. 1950)
- Died: Frank Hayes, 52, American silent film actor; died of pneumonia (b. 1871)

== December 29, 1923 (Saturday) ==
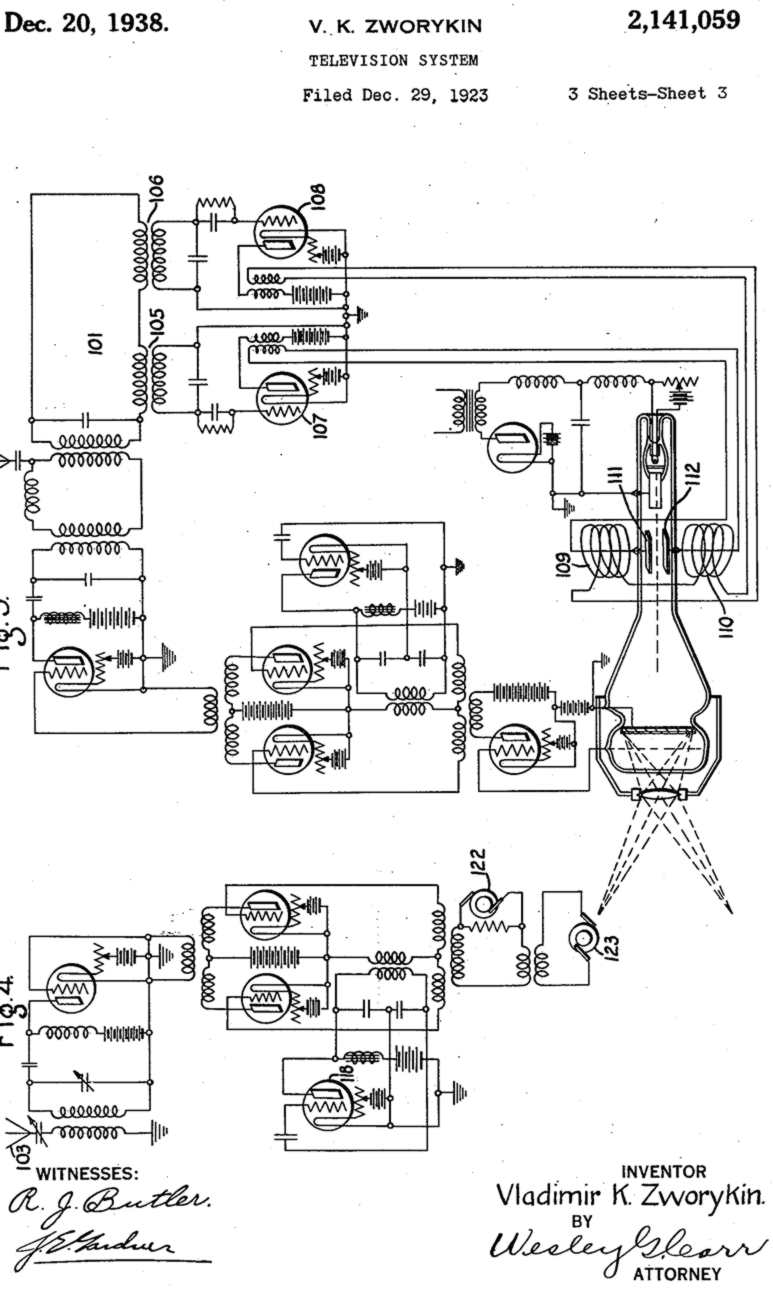
Zworykin's invention

- Russian-born American engineer Vladimir K. Zworykin and Westinghouse Electric and Manufacturing Company filed the first application for Zworykin's invention, "Television System". U.S. Patent No. 2,141,059 would be granted on December 20, 1938. His application stated "One of the objects of my invention is to provide a system for enabling a person to see distant moving objects or views by radio. Another object of my invention is to eliminate synchronizing devices heretofore employed in television systems. Still another object of my invention is to provide a system for broadcasting, from a central point, moving pictures, scenes from plays, or similar entertainments."
- The government of Germany agreed to pay the expenses incurred by France and Belgium for occupation of Germany's Ruhr area.
- The Italian steamship SS Mutlah and its crew of 40 disappeared after sending a distress call while sailing in the Mediterranean Sea.
- Britain and France clashed over the French collection of taxes on a mine in the Ruhr owned by British subjects.
- The Frank Lloyd-directed fantasy drama film Black Oxen, starring Corinne Griffith, Conway Tearle and Clara Bow, was released.
- Born:
  - Dina Merrill, American actress, socialite, businesswoman and philanthropist; as Nedenia Marjorie Hutton, in New York City, United States (d. 2017)
  - Boris Borzin, Soviet Ukrainian painter; in Krivonosovo, Kirovohrad, Ukrainian SSR (present-day Ukraine) (d. 1991)
- Died: Johann Mayer, 37, German serial killer; executed by guillotine at the Köln Prison (b. 1886)

== December 30, 1923 (Sunday) ==
- Dutch Anderson, Danish-born American gang member and bandit, escaped from Atlanta Federal Prison through a tunnel along with three other convicts and soon teamed up with his former partner in crime, Gerald Chapman, who had escaped the same prison on March 27.
- The rising Seine submerged all the quays and docks in Paris.
- Born: Charles Poser, Belgian-born American neurologist who created the Poser criteria for measuring impairment from multiple sclerosis; in Antwerp, Belgium (d. 2010)

== December 31, 1923 (Monday) ==
- The Seine began overflowing its banks in Paris.
- Petrograd was flooded when the Neva River overflowed.
- Experts announced after an examination of charred wreckage that had washed up along Sicily that the Dixmude was probably destroyed by a mid-air explosion.
- A Providence, Rhode Island court granted Minta Durfee a divorce from Fatty Arbuckle.
- The Florenz Ziegfeld-produced stage musical Kid Boots starring Eddie Cantor and Mary Eaton opened at the Earl Carroll Theatre on Broadway.
