= January 1924 =

Month of 1924

<<	January 1924					>>
Su	Mo	Tu	We	Th	Fr	Sa
		1	2	3	4	5
6	7	8	9	10	11	12
13	14	15	16	17	18	19
20	21	22	23	24	25	26
27	28	29	30	31

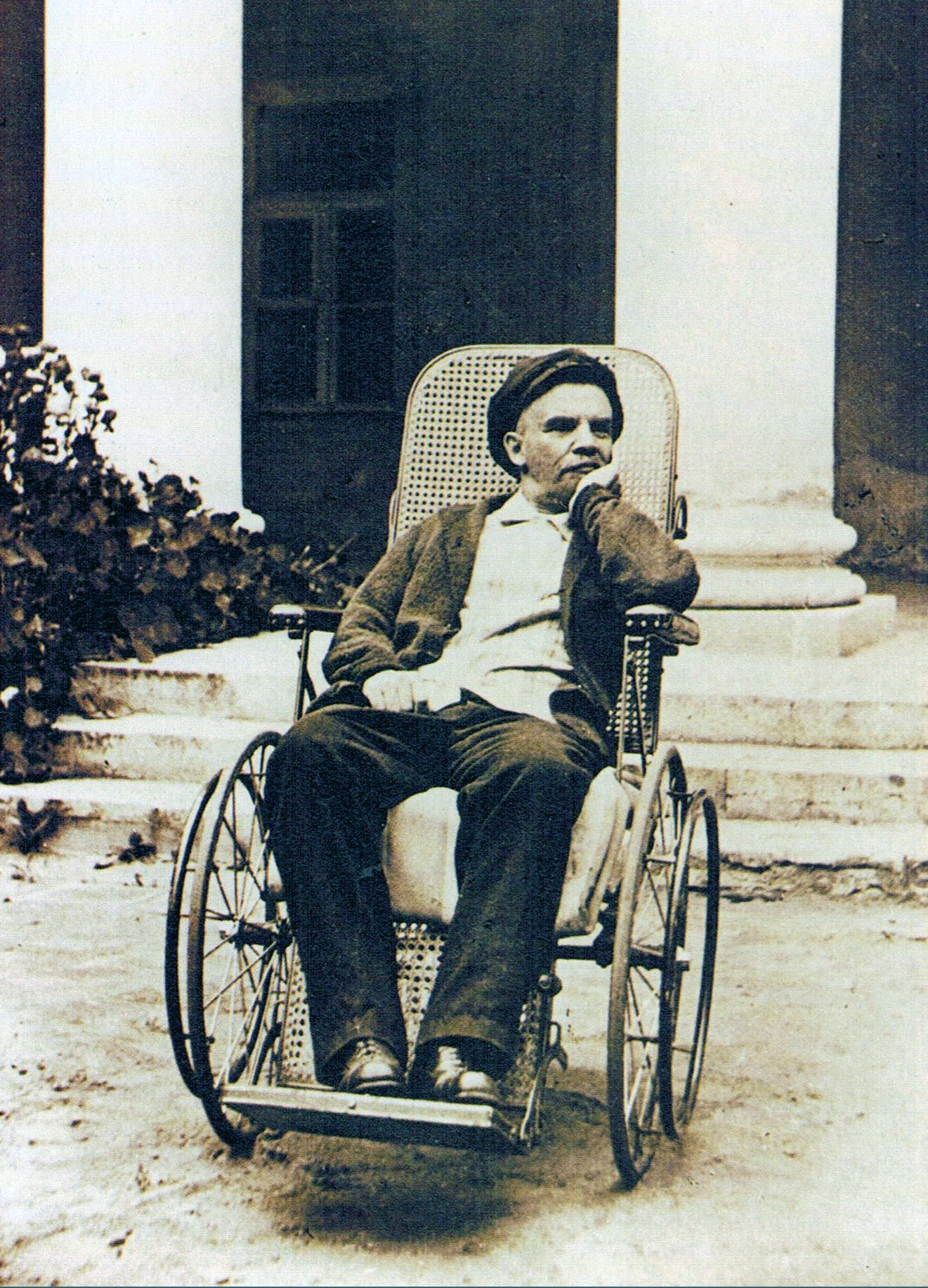
January 21, 1924: Soviet Union founder and leader Vladimir Lenin dies of a stroke

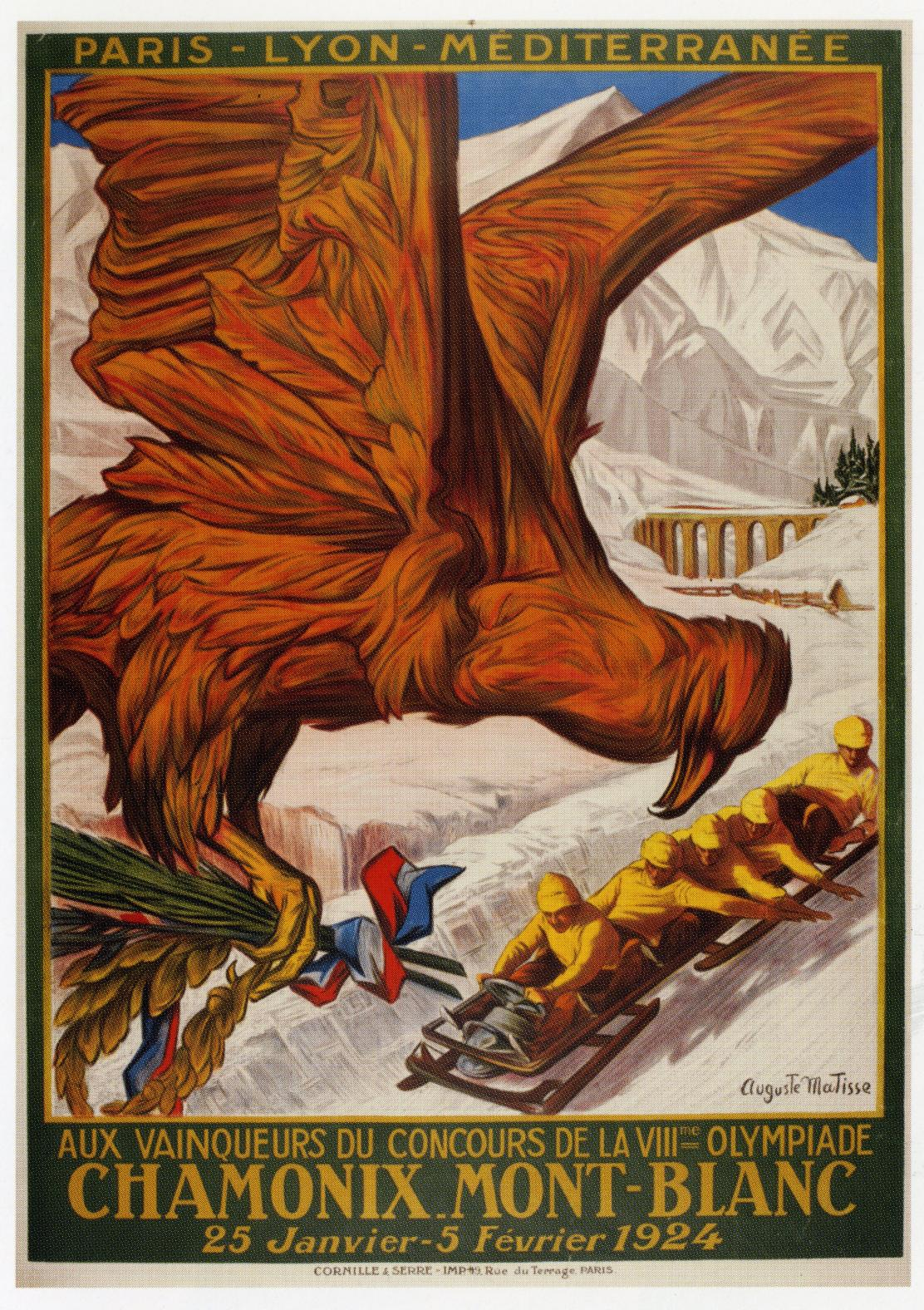
January 25, 1924: The first Winter Olympics open at Chamonix

The following events occurred in January 1924:

== January 1, 1924 (Tuesday) ==
- The Rose Bowl football game, at the time the only postseason bowl game in the U.S., was played before 40,000 spectators between the Washington Huskies (who had an 8-1-0 record and were selected by the Rose Bowl Committee despite having lost to the unbeaten California Golden Bears) and the Navy Midshipmen (a 5-1-2 team whom the Huskies had been allowed to pick as their opponent). The teams played to a 14–14 tie after Washington tied the game with a fourth quarter touchdown.
- During a New Year's Day party at the home of millionaire oil broker Courtland S. Dines, the chauffeur of actress Mabel Normand shot and wounded Dines in the abdomen with a pistol belonging to Normand. When police arrived they found Normand and fellow actress Edna Purviance in the kitchen frantically insisting they didn't know how Dines came to be shot. Alcohol was found on the premises (illegal at the time under Prohibition), and the whole episode caused a scandal which caused some exhibitors to pull Purviance's film A Woman of Paris from theaters.
- Born: Earl Torgeson, American professional baseball player, 1950 NL runs scored leader and 1957 AL fielding average leader; as Clifford Earl Torgeson, in Snohomish, Washington, United States (d. 1990)
- Died: Billy Miske, 29, American professional boxer; died of Bright's disease (b. 1894)

== January 2, 1924 (Wednesday) ==
- The Simon & Schuster publishing company was founded in the United States by Richard L. Simon and M. Lincoln Schuster.
- The Mexican government reported that federal troops loyal to President Álvaro Obregón had achieved a victory over the rebels of Adolfo de la Huerta in the vicinity of Zacualpan, State of Mexico.
- Primary railway stations in Paris closed as the water level of the Seine rose due to flooding.
- The Bulgarian government gave former King Ferdinand, who had been living in exile since 1918, permission to return to Sofia. The Kingdom of Yugoslavia immediately sent an ultimatum objecting to the move.
- Died:
  - Sabine Baring-Gould, 89, English novelist, song and hymn composer known for writing "Onward, Christian Soldiers" (b. 1834)
  - Clara Abbott, 66, American business executive and the first woman to serve on the board of directors of a major U.S. corporation. She was on the board of Abbott Laboratories from 1900 to 1908 and again from 1911 until her death (b. 1857)

== January 3, 1924 (Thursday) ==
- British archaeologist Howard Carter and his work team discovered the stone sarcophagus of Pharaoh Tutankhamun in his tomb near Luxor in Egypt.
- Felipe Carrillo Puerto, the 49-year-old Governor of the Mexican state of Yucatán since 1922, was executed by rebel followers of General Adolfo de la Huerta, who had started a revolution to overthrow the government of President Alvaro Obregón. Carrillo was killed along with 11 other people, including three of his brothers.
- The boxing-themed comedy film The Great White Way premiered at the Cosmopolitan Theatre in New York City.
- The German film New Year's Eve premiered.
- Born: Otto Beisheim, German businessman and founder of Metro AG membership discount retailer; in Vossnacken, near Velbert, Germany (d. 2013)

== January 4, 1924 (Friday) ==
- Germany issued an emergency decree known as the Emminger Reform, best known for abolishing the jury system in court proceedings and replacing it with a mixed system of judges.
- The Kingdom of Yugoslavia sent another sharp note to Bulgaria saying it would not accept the return of Ferdinand from exile or any further provocations. Newspapers in Belgrade clamored for war.
- Born: Wally Ris, American competitive swimmer, 1948 Olympic gold medalist in the 100m freestyle; as Walter Ris, in Chicago, United States (d. 1989)

== January 5, 1924 (Saturday) ==
- Greek national hero Eleftherios Venizelos was elected as the Speaker of the Hellenic Parliament by his colleagues. Hours later, he had a minor heart attack and had to leave the session over which he was presiding.

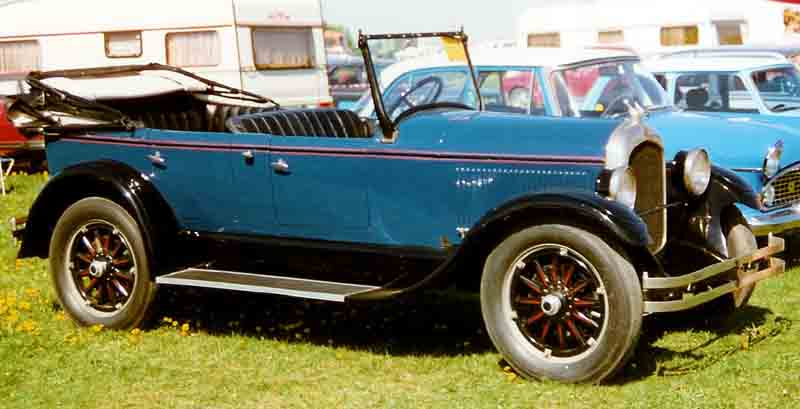
A 1924 Chrysler Six B-70

- Automobile manufacturer Walter P. Chrysler introduced his first car, the Chrysler Six Model B-70 sedan, at the 24th Annual New York Automobile Show, held at the 256th Field Artillery Armory in the Bronx.
- The ambitious worldwide service of Dollar Steamship Company was inaugurated in a ceremony that included transmission by U.S. President Calvin Coolidge of a wireless radio signal, giving the liner SS President Harrison permission to depart from San Francisco on a 79-day voyage to Boston.
- Factories and mines in the Ruhr region shut down as laborers refused to work ten hours a day.
- In the U.S., 19-year-old Celia Cooney began a string of armed robberies, starting with the Thomas Ralston Grocery in Brooklyn, where she walked out with $680 and left in a car driven by her husband Ed Cooney. Dubbed "The Bobbed Hair Bandit" by the New York press, Celia continued working with Ed until both were arrested on April 20.

== January 6, 1924 (Sunday) ==
- Turkish President Mustafa Kemal Atatürk survived a bomb attack, but his wife Latife Uşşaki was injured. The assailant visited Atatürk's home and asked to see him, then threw a bomb when he appeared.
- The French government gave the Catholic Church the right to reoccupy its former property under the "diocesan associations" system.
- Born: Earl Scruggs, American musician and songwriter; near Boiling Springs, North Carolina, United States (d. 2012)

== January 7, 1924 (Monday) ==
- The Fédération Internationale de Hockey (FIH) was founded in Paris by representatives of field hockey of Austria, Belgium, Czechoslovakia, France, Hungary, Spain, and Switzerland, with Paul Léautey as its first president. A century later, the FIH would govern the rules of field hockey and oversee 140 national associations.
- Mexican rebels captured the oil port city of Tampico.
- Kiyoura Keigo became Prime Minister of Japan.
- Born:
  - Geoffrey Bayldon, English actor; as Albert Geoffrey Bayldon, in Leeds, England (d. 2017)
  - Gene L. Coon, American screenwriter and television producer, known for developing the Star Trek TV series with Gene Roddenberry; as Eugene Lee Coon, in Beatrice, Nebraska, United States (d. 1973)

== January 8, 1924 (Tuesday) ==
- The Soviet newspaper Pravda reported that Leon Trotsky was ill, a statement which the rank and file took to mean as a sign of his imminent removal.
- United Kingdom Labour Party leader Ramsay MacDonald gave a speech at a packed Royal Albert Hall where he announced that Labour would accept office as soon as it was invited to do so, though it would be taking over a "bankrupt estate". MacDonald pledged to run the country along sound economic lines, make efforts through the League of Nations to retain peace in Europe, and end the "pompous folly" of refusing to recognize the Soviet Union.
- Born:
  - Kim Dae-jung, South Korean politician, activist and statesman, served as President of South Korea from 1998 to 2003, and Nobel Peace Prize laureate in 2000; Hauido, Chōsen, Japanese Empire (present-day South Korea) (d. 2009)
  - Ron Moody, English actor known for his portrayal of Fagin in the 1968 film musical Oliver! and its 1983 Broadway revival; as Ronald Moodnick, in Tottenham, Middlesex, England (d. 2015)

== January 9, 1924 (Wednesday) ==
- Ramsay MacDonald was re-elected leader of Britain's Labour Party at a full party meeting.
- Born:
  - Kip Siegel, American physicist and entrepreneur, founder of KMS Fusion to develop the first laser-controlled thermonuclear fusion; as Keeve Milton Siegel, in New York City, United States (d. 1975)
  - Mary Kaye, American guitarist and performer; as Malia Ka'aihue, in Detroit, United States (d. 2007)
- Died: Franz Josef Heinz, 39, German separatist former leader of the "Autonomous Palatinate" in association with the Rhenish Republic; assassinated in Speyer by 20 members of the German nationalist paramilitary group, the Viking League (b. 1884). The attack on the dining room of the Wittelsbacher Hof also killed a hotel guest and an employee, while two of the assassins died in a shootout.

== January 10, 1924 (Thursday) ==
- All 43 crew of the British submarine HMS L24 were killed when the sub sank after a collision with the battleship HMS Resolution in a training exercise in the English Channel.
- The Cohn-Brandt-Cohn film company (CBC), founded in 1918 by Joe Brandt and brothers Harry Cohn and Jack Cohn, rebranded itself, changing its name to Columbia Pictures.
- In the occupied Rhineland, France imposed a curfew and closed the borders between the occupied section and the rest of Germany, permitting no traffic in or out except for railroad business and food supplies and a curfew was imposed. The move came amid fears of a new separatist coup attempt after the murder of Franz Josef Heinz the previous day. Relations between Britain and France became strained when French Prime Minister Raymond Poincaré refused to allow British officials into the occupied Rhineland to conduct their own investigation of the separatist movement there.
- Born:
  - Earl Bakken, American inventor who created the first wearable artificial pacemaker, developed by his company Medtronic; in Columbia Heights, Minnesota, United States (d. 2018)
  - Max Roach, American jazz drummer; as Maxwell Roach, in Newland, North Carolina, United States (d. 2007)
  - Marilyn Cotlow, American opera singer, known for starring in the original Broadway production of Gian Carlo Menotti's The Telephone (1947); in Minneapolis, United States (d. 2024)
- Died: Peter MacQueen, 60, American war correspondent, church pastor and adventurer; died of a heart attack (b. 1863)

== January 11, 1924 (Friday) ==
- Mexican government troops recaptured Pachuca from the rebels, and began a battle to retake Tuxpan.
- Born:
  - Roger Guillemin, French neuroendocrinologist, recipient of the Nobel Prize in Physiology or Medicine; in Dijon, France (d. 2024)
  - Slim Harpo, American blues musician; as Isiah Moore or James Isaac Moore, in Lobdell, Louisiana, United States (d. 1970)

== January 12, 1924 (Saturday) ==
- Mexican mountaineer irregulars loyal to President Obregón recaptured Oaxaca City from the rebels.
- France rejected a British-backed proposal to arrange a League of Nations committee to investigate separatism in the Rhineland Palatinate. Prime Minister Poincaré insisted it was strictly the business of the countries directly involved in administrating the region.
- Bengali activist Gopinath Saha shot a man he thought was Calcutta police commissioner Charles Tegart, but learned that he had killed a different Englishman, Ernest Day, instead. Saha was sentenced to death for the crime and hanged on March 1.
- Born:
  - Olivier Gendebien, Belgian racing driver, four-time winner of the 24 hours of Le Mans race (1958, 1960, 1961 and 1962); in Brussels, Belgium (d. 1998)
  - Chris Chase, American journalist, model and actress; as Irene Greengard, in New York City, United States (d. 2013)
- Died: Alexis Lapointe, 63, eccentric French Canadian endurance runner; killed after he was struck by a train (b. 1860)

== January 13, 1924 (Sunday) ==
- The second stage of Egypt's first election for parliament took place as 38,000 electors (who had been selected in September 27) cast their votes for candidates for the 215 members of the Chamber of Deputies and 147 members of the Egyptian Senate. The Wafd Party, led by exiled nationalist Saad Zaghloul, won 188 of the 215 seats available in the Chamber, with only 27 seats for the independent candidates, prompting the resignation of Prime Minister Ibrahim Pasha.
- A long meeting between British ambassador Crewe and Prime Minister Poincaré over the Rhineland separatism issue was said to be unproductive.
- The American Communist newspaper The Worker changed its name to Daily Worker.
- The Chicago Daily Tribune announced a nationwide contest to name the new general interest magazine the paper's owners were planning to launch in the spring. The winner would receive a $20,000 cash prize. The entry eventually chosen would be Liberty.
- The crime drama film The Humming Bird, starring Gloria Swanson was released.
- Born:
  - Roland Petit, French dancer and choreographer, founder of the Ballet National de Marseille; in Villemomble, Seine-Saint-Denis, France (d. 2011)
  - Milton Klein, American nuclear engineer and official of the Space Nuclear Propulsion Office, which oversaw NASA's use of nuclear power; in St. Louis, United States (d. 2022)
- Died: Georg Hermann Quincke, 89, German physicist (b. 1834)

== January 14, 1924 (Monday) ==
- Charles G. Dawes accepted the chairmanship of a committee assembled to investigate Germany's capacity to pay its war reparations.
- Britain began an independent investigation into the Rhineland separatist movement, against the wishes of France.
- Born:
  - Guy Williams, American actor, known as the star of Zorro (1957–1959) and of Lost in Space (1965–1968); as Armando Catalano, in New York City, United States (d. 1989)
  - Carole Cook, American film and TV actress; as Mildred Frances Cook, in Abilene, Texas, United States (d. 2023)
- Died:
  - Luther Emmett Holt, 68, American pediatrician, author of the best selling books The Care and Feeding of Children and Diseases of Infancy and Childhood; died of a heart attack (b. 1855)
  - Howard R. Hughes Sr., 54, American inventor and founder of the Hughes Tool Company, invented the two-cone rotary Sharp-Hughes Rock Bit used for the drilling of oil wells; died of a heart attack (b. 1869)

== January 15, 1924 (Tuesday) ==
- The world's first radio play, Danger by Richard Hughes, was broadcast by the British Broadcasting Corporation from its studios in London.
- King George V and Queen Mary opened the new session of British Parliament.
- The French Cabinet drafted a plan to stabilize the franc, which had lost more than three-quarters of its pre-war value. The plan called for many tax hikes and a reduction in civil servants.
- SMS Berlin became the first German Navy warship since the 1918 end of World War One to embark on an overseas voyage, departing Kiel on a two-month tour of the islands of the North Atlantic Ocean, before returning on March 18.

== January 16, 1924 (Wednesday) ==
- Argentine engineer Raúl Pateras Pescara broke his own record for helicopter flight when he kept his model 2F aloft in the air for 8 minutes and 13.8 seconds at Issy-les-Moulineaux near Paris. It flew in a straight line almost three-quarters of a mile at an altitude of about fifteen feet.
- Gonzalo Córdova was elected President of Ecuador with only token opposition, and received more than 93% of the votes cast.
- The Broadway version of the 1911 German play The Miracle opened at the Century Theatre.
- At around 7:00 in the evening, the American dirigible Shenandoah broke free of its mooring mast in Lakehurst, New Jersey during a raging gale and began drifting with 22 men aboard. The airship was brought back under control and lowered into the hangar around 3:20 the next morning.
- Born: Katy Jurado, Mexican film actress, one of the first Latin American performers to achieve widespread popularity in U.S. film and won a Golden Globe Award in 1952 for her performance in High Noon; as María Cristina Estela Marcela Jurado García, in Mexico City, Mexico (d. 2002)
- Died: General Licerio Gerónimo, 68, Filipino military leader, known for his defeat of General Henry Lawton in the 1899 Battle of San Mateo (b. 1855)

== January 17, 1924 (Thursday) ==
- Yahya Ibrahim Pasha resigned as Prime Minister of Egypt.
- H. H. Asquith of the Liberal Party made a surprising speech in the British House of Commons pledging to support a minority government headed by the Labour Party, making the fall of the Stanley Baldwin Conservative government almost certain.

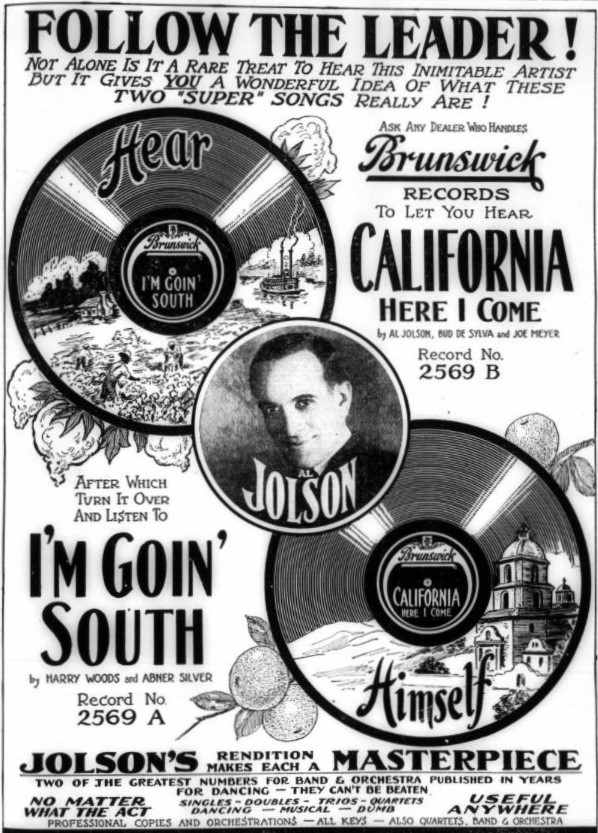
The hit record of 1924

- The most popular song of 1924, "California, Here I Come", was recorded by Al Jolson and the Isham Jones Orchestra at the Brunswick Records studio in Chicago.

== January 18, 1924 (Friday) ==
- Conflicting accounts arose as to the whereabouts of Leon Trotsky amid rumors he had been arrested. He was in fact traveling to the Black Sea to convalesce from illness.
- A Soviet party conference ended with the passing of a resolution blaming Trotsky for divisions within the Communist Party. Joseph Stalin attacked Trotsky in a withering speech accusing him of sowing dissent.
- A preliminary hearing into the New Year's Day shooting of Courtland Dines began in Los Angeles. Edna Purviance testified that she was not present in the room when the shooting occurred.
- In Madison Square Garden, world middleweight boxing champion Harry Greb defeated Johnny Wilson in a fifteen-round decision to retain the title.

== January 19, 1924 (Saturday) ==
- In an action in the Basmachi rebellion in the Soviet Union's Khorezm People's Soviet Republic (now part of the Republic of Uzbekistan), Basmachi rebels began a siege of the capital at Khiva, with an estimated 9,000-man force.
- U.S. Secretary of the Navy Edwin Denby testified before the House Naval Affairs Committee in support of an expedition to the Arctic by the airship USS Shenandoah, to claim any undiscovered land. "This area is certain to be of high strategic value if we look forward to warfare and commerce in the future", he said.
- The short story "The Most Dangerous Game" by Richard Connell appeared in the popular weekly magazine Collier's. The tale of a big game hunter who becomes the human prey of another hunter, the story was made into a film in 1932, and the plot of the "hunter becoming the hunted" would be adapted numerous times in film, radio and television. Connell's work has been described as "the most popular short story ever written in English."
- Born:
  - Nicholas Colasanto, American actor and television director; in Providence, Rhode Island (d. 1985)
  - Jean-François Revel, French writer and philosopher; in Marseille, France (d. 2006)
- Died: Édouard François Zier, 67–68, French painter and illustrator (b. 1856)

== January 20, 1924 (Sunday) ==
- Mexican rebels captured Villahermosa, capital of the Mexican state of Tabasco. Governor Tomás Garrido Canabal was able to escape and the rebels installed Manuel Antonio Romero as the new Governor of Tabasco.
- HC Château-d'Oex won the ninth Swiss International Ice Hockey Championship, defeating HC Davos 3–2 in the Final.
- The Swedish football club Växjö BK was founded.

== January 21, 1924 (Monday) ==
- Vladimir Lenin, the semi-retired founder and leader of the Soviet Union and the de facto leader of the USSR as First Secretary of the Soviet Communist Party, died at his estate in Gorki at 18:50 hrs Moscow time following a stroke. Top Soviet leaders were convening at the Eleventh All-Russia Congress of Soviets at the Bolshoi Theatre when news of Lenin's death was communicated by telephone, and an eyewitness reported never seeing so many men in tears.
- By a margin of 328 to 256, the British House of Commons endorsed a motion of no confidence against Prime Minister Stanley Baldwin and his government ministry.
- India's 145-member Central Legislative Assembly, the lower chamber of the Imperial Legislative Council, convened at the Council House in New Delhi following the November election. The session, with 105 natives of India and 40 nominated members (most of whom were British or of British ancestry), was opened by The Earl of Reading, the British Viceroy of India.
- Albania's 102-member parliament, the Kuvendi i Shqipërisë, opened following the 1923 election.
- At midnight, 60,000 rail workers went on strike in the United Kingdom to protest a recent reduction in wages ordered by the National Wage Board. British newspapers with nationwide distribution arranged fleets of trucks to maintain their circulations during the work stoppage.
- Mabel Normand and Courtland S. Dines testified in the New Year's Day shooting case when the court convened in the hospital where they were staying (Normand was there with an inflamed appendix). Both of them claimed to be unable to remember much about the incident.
- The musical comedy Lollipop with book by Zelda Sears, lyrics by Sears and Walter De Leon and music by Vincent Youmans opened on Broadway.
- Born:
  - Madhu Dandavate, Indian physicist and politician, served as Minister of Railways from 1977 to 1979, and as Minister of Finance from 1989 to 1990; in Ahmednagar, Bombay Province, British India (present-day Maharashtra, India) (d. 2005)
  - Benny Hill, English comedian and actor known for his risque syndicated program, winner of two Emmy Awards for outstanding variety; as Alfred Hawthorne Hill, in Southampton, England (d. 1992)
- Died: Vladimir Lenin, 53, Russian revolutionary and Communist politician, served as the leader of the Soviet Union from 1918 until his death (b. 1870)

== January 22, 1924 (Tuesday) ==
- British Prime Minister Stanley Baldwin resigned following a vote of no confidence the previous day. Ramsay MacDonald was summoned by King George V to Buckingham Palace to form a government and became the first Labour Party Prime Minister of the United Kingdom. MacDonald was also the first British Prime Minister from a working-class background, and one of only a few without a university education.
- A complete autopsy was conducted on Vladimir Lenin's body. A cerebral hemorrhage was given as the cause of death. The brain was subsequently removed for study, as part of a directive that had been issued by Lenin, and a detailed, two-year study would begin at the Brain Research Institute in Moscow on January 24, under the direction of a German neurologist, Dr. Oskar Vogt.
- The first issue of the Howard University student newspaper The Hilltop was published.
- Born:
  - Robert Halmi, Hungarian-born U.S. television and film producer; in Budapest, Kingdom of Hungary (present-day Hungary) (d. 2014)
  - Sonny Myers, American professional wrestler; as Harold Myers, in St. Joseph, Missouri, United States (d. 2007)

== January 23, 1924 (Wednesday) ==
- Lenin's casket was transported to the House of the Unions and placed in its Hall of Columns.
- Soviet architect Alexey Shchusev was given the task of constructing a tomb for Lenin within three days.
- The Mexican cities of Saltillo and Monterrey fell into the hands of rebel insurgents.
- Britain and the United States signed a treaty allowing American authorities to search British ships suspected of rum-running.
- The Western film Heritage of the Desert, starring Bebe Daniels, was released.
- Born:
  - Al Blaustein, American painter; as Alfred Blaustein, in New York City, United States (d. 2004)
  - Frank Lautenberg, American politician, served as the U.S. Senator for New Jersey from 1982 to 2001; in Paterson, New Jersey, United States (d. 2013)

== January 24, 1924 (Thursday) ==
- The Teapot Dome scandal deepened when oil tycoon Edward L. Doheny admitted in testimony that he had lent Senator Albert B. Fall $100,000.
- With only 290 soldiers to defend the city of Khiva, the Soviet Red Army routed the siege by Basmachi rebels in the Soviet Union's Khorezm People's Soviet Republic (now part of the Republic of Uzbekistan).
- Died: Marie-Adélaïde, 29, Grand Duchess of Luxembourg from 1912 to 1919; died of influenza (b. 1894)

== January 25, 1924 (Friday) ==
- The first Winter Olympics opened in Chamonix, France.
- France and Czechoslovakia signed a mutual defense pact pledging aid in the event of an unprovoked attack by a third party.
- A coal mine explosion killed 37 miners near Johnston City, Illinois.
- Mexican rebels took Morelia after a four-day battle.
- Born:
  - Lou Groza, American football player and enshrinee in the Pro Football Hall of Fame; as Louis Roy Groza, in Martins Ferry, Ohio, United States (d. 2000)
  - Husein Mehmedov, Bulgarian of Turkish descent wrestler who competed in the 1956 Summer Olympics; in Razgrad, Bulgaria (d. 2014)
  - Speedy West, American guitarist and record producer; as Wesley Webb West, in Springfield, Missouri, United States (d. 2003)

== January 26, 1924 (Saturday) ==
- In an elaborate royal wedding in Tokyo, Prince Regent Hirohito, heir to the Imperial Throne, married Princess Nagako.
- Radio National, the first Australian radio network, began when the Postmaster-General's Department's National Broadcasting Service linked its 2FC radio station in Sydney with its second station, 3AR in Melbourne. Links would follow later in the year with Adelaide and Hobart.
- U.S. President Calvin Coolidge announced that he would appoint special counsel from both parties to prosecute any criminal wrongdoing in the Teapot Dome scandal.
- The Soviet Union announced that the city of Petrograd (which had been Saint Petersburg until World War One) had been renamed Leningrad. In 1991, voters in Russia would elect to return the city to its original name of Saint Petersburg.
- An explosion killed 36 miners at the Lancashire No. 18 Mine in Shanktown, Pennsylvania, located in Indiana County.
- Saad Zaghloul formed a government as Prime Minister of Egypt, the first to be picked under new Constitution providing for an elected parliament.
- Born: Annette Strauss, American philanthropist and politician, served as the Mayor of Dallas from 1987 to 1991; as Annette Louise Greenfield, in Houston, United States (d. 1998)

== January 27, 1924 (Sunday) ==
- A state funeral was held for Vladimir Lenin in Moscow's Red Square under frigid (−35 degrees Fahrenheit) conditions, with a screen temperature of −35 °F (−37 °C).
- Representatives of Italy and the Kingdom of Serbs, Croats and Slovenes (later Yugoslavia) signed the Treaty of Rome, which provided that the Free State of Fiume would be annexed to Italy while Sušak would go the Kingdom of Serbs, Croats, and Slovenes.
- Italy's Prime Minister Benito Mussolini dissolved the Chamber of Deputies and called new elections.
- Born:
  - Sein Lwin, Burmese politician, served as the President of Myanmar from July 27 to August 12, 1988, dubbed "The Butcher of Rangoon" for his brutal suppression of the 8888 Uprising in 1988; in Kawkayin village, Paung, British Burma (present-day Myanmar) (d. 2004)
  - Sabu Dastagir, Indian and American film actor; as Selar Sabu, in Karapur, Mysore, Kingdom of Mysore, British India (present-day Karnataka, India) (d. 1963)

== January 28, 1924 (Monday) ==
- Campaigning began for a general election in Italy. Benito Mussolini addressed 10,000 Blackshirts in the Palazzo Venezia in Rome, predicting complete victory at the polls and declaring that the Fascists were "ready to kill or die."
- In the French West African colony of Senegal, Mahecor Joof was crowned as the last King of Sine (Maad a Sinig) at a ceremony in Diakhao, and would be permitted limited authority to reign until his death on August 3, 1969.
- The U.S. House of Representatives adopted a resolution appropriating $100,000 for the use of special counsel to pursue the investigation and any charges in the Teapot Dome scandal.
- A trial began in Milwaukee over a lawsuit brought by banned baseball player Shoeless Joe Jackson against the Chicago White Sox for $18,200 in backpay.

== January 29, 1924 (Tuesday) ==
- Supported by the Mexican Air Force (Fuerza Aérea Mexicana), Mexican federal troops won a hard-fought battle for Esperanza in the state of Puebla. The battle was one of the turning points of the Delahuertista Rebellion, the attempt by former President Adolfo de la Huerta to overthrow President Álvaro Obregón. Ralph O'Neill, a Mexican-born American with dual citizenship and a veteran pilot for the U.S. in World War One, led a counterattack against the insurgents with strafing runs by the FAM's De Havilland DH-4B combat aircraft, which had been purchased when De la Huerta had been president.
- Britain's railway strike was settled.
- Charles G. Dawes and other members of his committee arrived in Berlin.
- Born: Luigi Nono, Italian classical music composer; in Venice, Kingdom of Italy (present-day Italy) (d. 1990)

== January 30, 1924 (Wednesday) ==
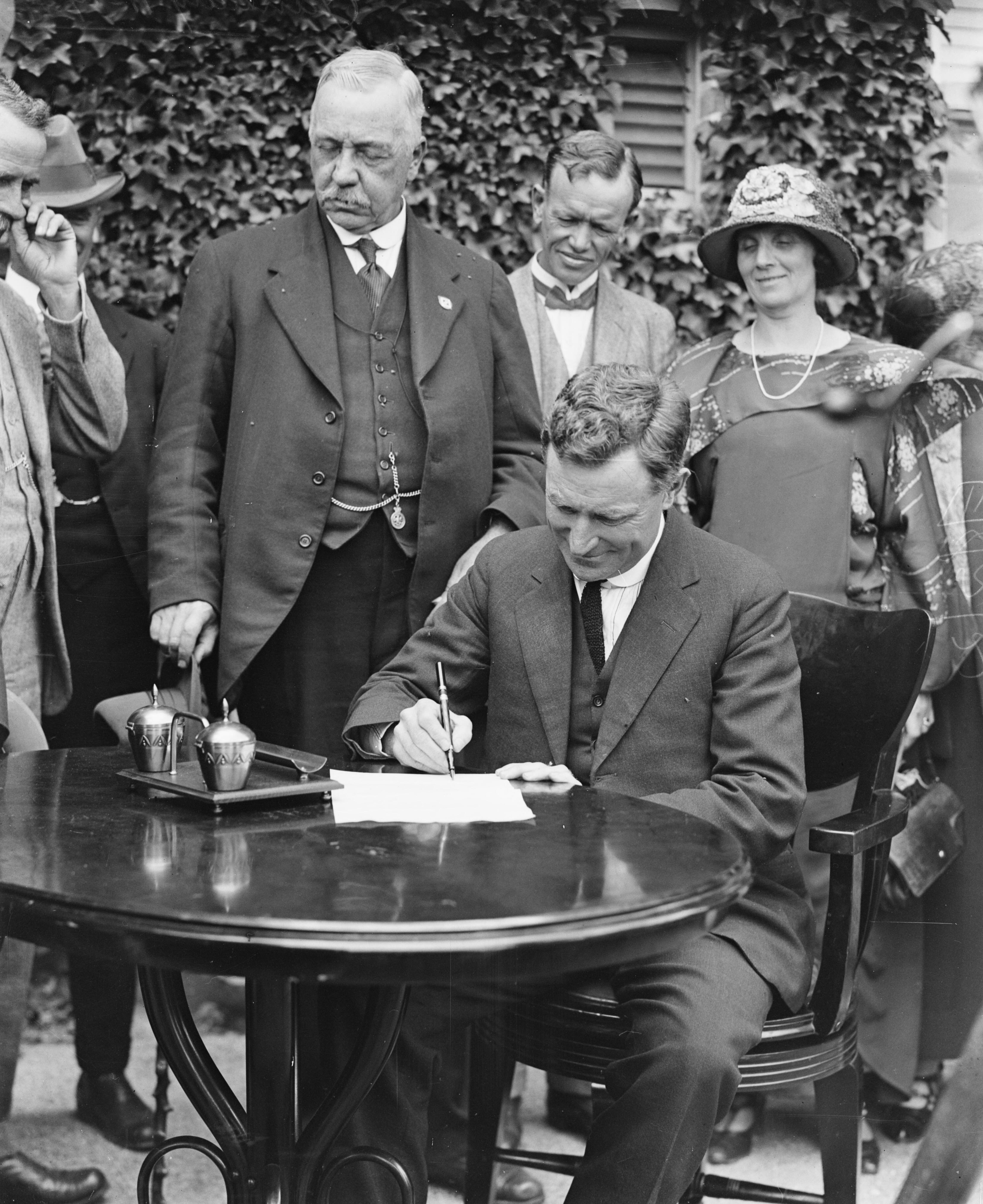
Acting Prime Minister Page signing the first official document in Canberra

- The city of Canberra, still three years away from becoming the capital of Australia, hosted a meeting of the Australian government for the first time. Earle Page, chairman of the National Party and the secretary for the Ministry of the Treasury, served as the Acting Prime Minister during the absence of Stanley Bruce from the Commonwealth, and convened a meeting of the Federal Cabinet at the Yarralumla House rather than at the capital building at Melbourne.
- Joe Jackson took the stand in his lawsuit against the White Sox.
- Born:
  - Helen Spaith Vanni, American opera singer with 400 performances at the Metropolitan Opera between 1956 and 1970; as Helen Spaeth, in Davenport, Iowa, United States (d. 2023)
  - Sailor Art Thomas, African American professional wrestler, inductee of the WWE Hall of Fame; as Arthur Thomas, in Gurdon, Arkansas, United States (d. 2003)
  - Lloyd Alexander, American author of The Chronicles of Prydain series; in Philadelphia, United States (d. 2007)

== January 31, 1924 (Thursday) ==
- The first Constitution of the Soviet Union was approved unanimously by the 1,540 delegates to the Second All-Union Congress of Soviets. The new Constitution applied to all signatories to the Treaty on the Creation of the Union of Soviet Socialist Republics, which had become effective on December 29, 1922, and supplemented national constitutions that had governed the Soviet socialist republics of Russia; the Transcaucasian Federation (later the Armenian, Azerbaijani and Georgian SSRs); the Ukraine and Byelorussia. Officially, the USSR was to be governed by a 371-member Congress of Soviets with proportional representation, and a 20-member Congress of Nationalities with five members from each Republic.
- The United States Senate passed a resolution concerning the Teapot Dome scandal, stating that the leases to the Mammoth Oil Company and the Pan American Petroleum Company "were executed under circumstances indicating fraud and corruption".
- Japanese Prime Minister Kiyoura Keigo dissolved the National Diet and called for new elections. A brawl broke out during the morning session over accusations that the government had failed to protect a train that prominent opposition leaders were riding on when it was pelted with rocks and timbers.
- White Sox owner Charles Comiskey took the stand as a hostile witness in the Joe Jackson lawsuit trial.
- Former U.S. President Woodrow Wilson was reported to be seriously ill with a digestive disorder.
- Twenty-four days after the death of his wife, Prussian state executioner Paul Spaethe dressed in formal evening wear, lit 45 candles – one for each person he had beheaded – and committed suicide with a revolver.
