= Hydrox Corporation =

Defunct American food and beverage company from Chicago

Hydrox
- Trade name: Hydrox Corporation
- Company type: Subsidiary
- Industry: Food processing
- Founded: 1888; 138 years ago in Chicago, U.S.
- Founders: Chauncey B. Blair; Consumers Company
- Defunct: 1988
- Headquarters: Chicago, Illinois, United States
- Area served: United States
- Products: Ice cream; soft drinks

Hydrox Corporation, initially known as the Hydrox Company, was an American food company based in Chicago. Founded in 1888 by the Consumers Company and Chauncey B. Blair, it manufactured both ice cream and soft drinks.

== History ==
=== Early history ===
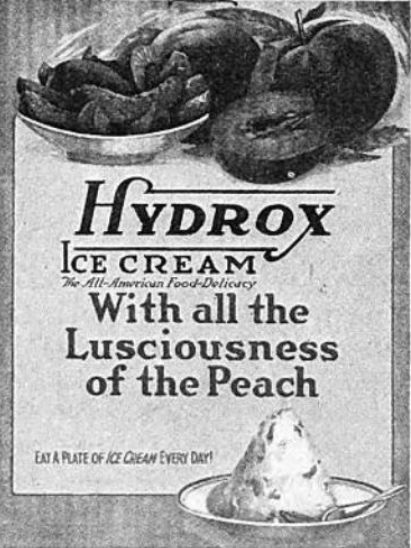
A Hydrox ad from 1917–18

Hydrox was founded in 1888 by the Consumers Company and Chauncey B. Blair as the Hydrox Company. It first sold drinks such as root beer and ginger ale, but soon started making ice cream, which became its main product. In 1917, Thomas McInnerney split the company from the Consumers Company. Heavy post-war advertising and several slogans during 1917–1918 led to the rise of Hydrox. By 1920, Hydrox was the most popular ice cream brand in Chicago. Hydrox bought the Collins Bros. and Thompson-Reid ice cream companies in 1921.

=== Absorption into National Dairy Products and beyond ===
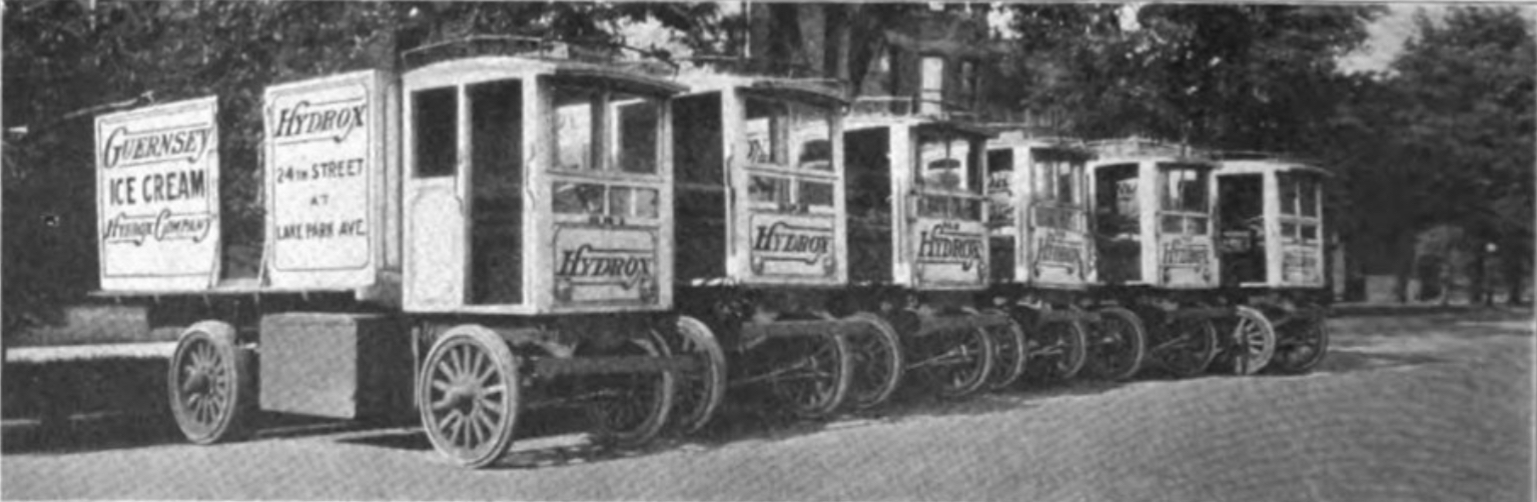
Hydrox trucks in 1922

Around 1922, Hydrox absorbed the New York-based Shevers Company, a business which was growing. In December 10, 1922, Hydrox's ice cream division was sold to the National Dairy Products Corporation. Following the absorption, Hydrox Company was renamed Hydrox Corporation on December 26. By the mid-1920s, it had four factories, all located across Chicago, and in the late 1920s the company had started a free ice cream campaign, with over 7,000 dishes given around April 1929. Hydrox was also known for giant trucks with huge lettering that read "Hydrox Ice Cream". By December 31, 1942, Hydrox had expanded to Missouri and New York.

On some occasions, Hydrox was advertised as "Graf's Hydrox", despite not being owned by Graf's and having no relation. Hydrox Soda was distributed by E. Minkowski and Kenosha Liquor Co around the 1940s.

=== Shutdown ===
In 1986, Hydrox Soda had published its last known ads. The following year, 1987, Hydrox Ice Cream also had its own final advertisements. Around 1988, their Chicago headquarters, which was located on 415 E 24th Street, was demolished. The building was known to have been used by an auto body firm in the same year.

== Products ==
Hydrox products consisted of ice cream and soda and had many flavors. It started in the markets in 1892 with distilled water, and its initial product listings included sarsaparilla, birch beer, lemon soda, root beer, and ginger ale. Other products produced by Hydrox included Sparkling Hydrox, Hydrolaris and Hydrox Lithia.

Its introduction of ice cream in 1910 proved to be highly successful. The milk in its ice cream was reportedly made from the Guernsey cattle of the famous Glenwood family.

== Logo history ==
1890's–early 1900's

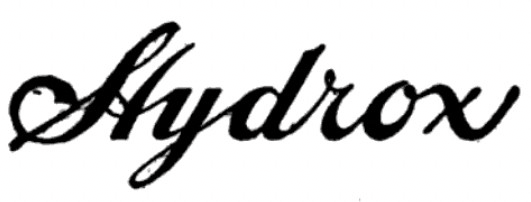
early 1900's–mid 1910's

mid 1910's–1988

== See also ==
- Kraft Foods
