= Ivan Pokhitonov =

Ukrainian artist (1850–1923)

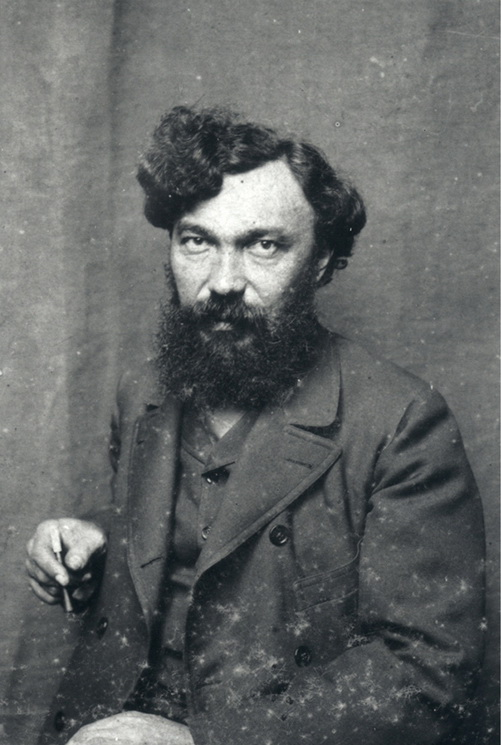
- Pokhitonov (Date Unknown)
- Born: January 27, 1850; Motronivka, Kherson Governorate, Russian Empire (present-day Ukraine)
- Died: December 23, 1923 (aged 73); Brussels, Belgium or Liège, Belgium
- Education: Odesa University

Ivan Pavlovich Pokhitonov (Russian: Ива́н Па́влович Похито́нов; 8 February [O.S. 27 January] 1850 – 23 December [O.S. 12 December] 1923) was a Russian landscape painter and graphic artist, who spent much of his working life in France and Belgium.

After the Bolshevik Coup he moved to the south of Ukraine, where the Ukrainian army was active. After the Ukrainian movement collapsed in 1921, he left the country.

== Biography ==
He was born on a large farm in the Kherson Governorate of the Russian Empire (present-day Ukraine) to Pavel Pokhitonov and Varvara Alekseevna. His father was a retired military man who had received a title of nobility, was a member of the Kherson governing committee, supervised the local Zemstvo school and was an honorary magistrate. His mother was from a family of Serbians that had come during the 18th century. At the age of seven, he was already making copies of the Dutch engravings that decorated his home. In 1860, he became one of the first students at a new private boys academy in Yelisavetgrad. He later attended several other schools.

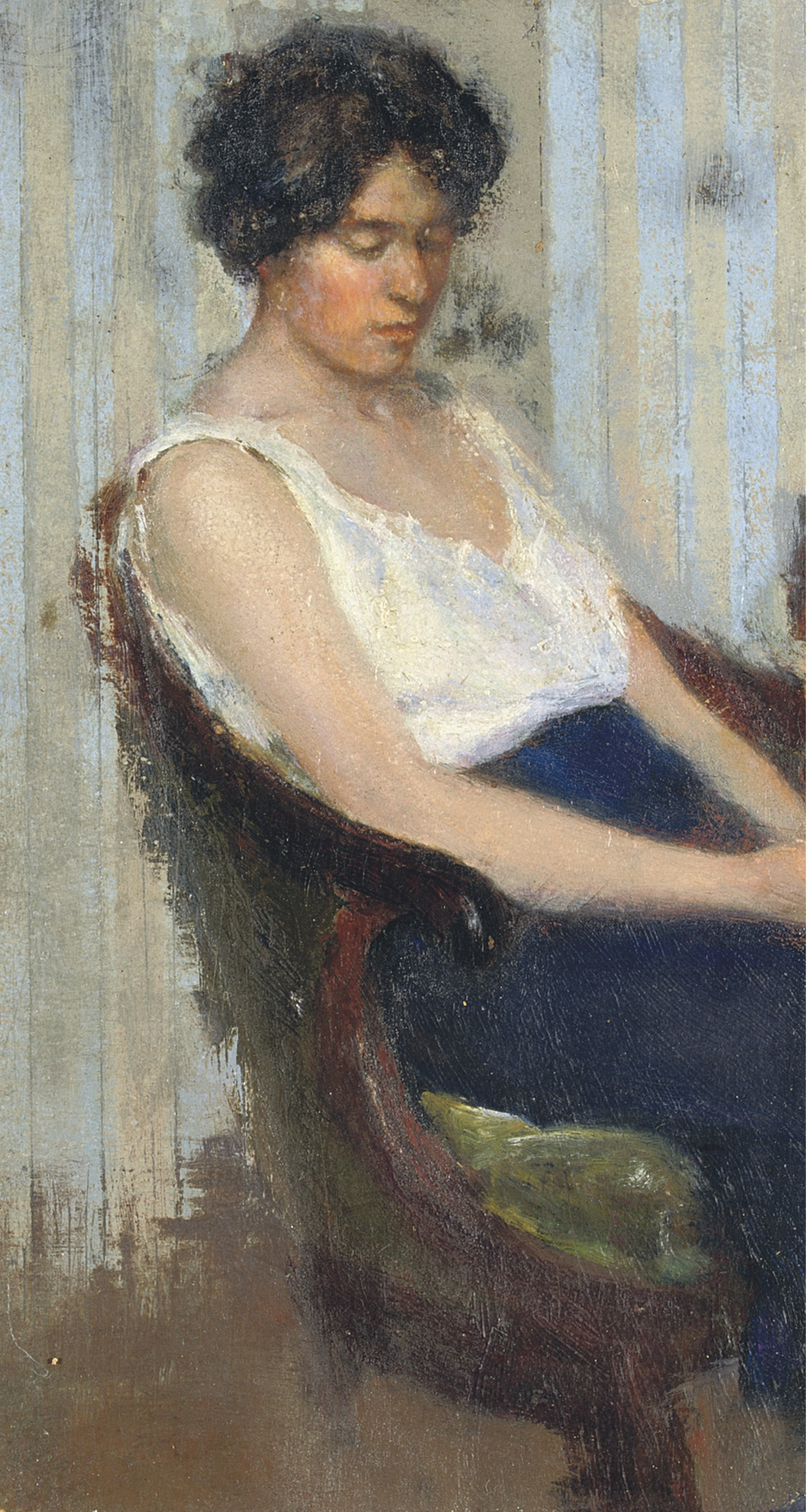
Portrait of Eugenia (Ninie) Wulffert

In 1868, he entered the Petrovskaya Agricultural Academy in Moscow. At that time, many of the students there held revolutionary opinions, and he attended speeches lamenting the plight of small farmers. He became caught up in the complicated events involving the nihilist Sergey Nechayev, but escaped serious punishment. He was, however, expelled and sent home to be supervised by his father and the police.

In 1871, he was allowed to enroll at Odessa University, where he took classes in drawing and watercolors in addition to his regular course of study. These classes would be his only formal art instruction. Shortly after, he travelled to Geneva with his mother and sister, where he exhibited his watercolors. They were a success so, after a brief period of employment at the "State Bank of Odessa", he travelled to Italy, then settled in Paris and found a position working with Eugène Carrière. He exhibited regularly at the Salon and several of his paintings were purchased by Pavel Tretyakov. Later, he would sign a lucrative contract with Georges Petit.

=== Marriage ===
In 1881, he received an order from the Russian government to paint a series of panels depicting scenes from the Russo-Turkish War. He travelled to Bulgaria to do sketches for the work, accompanied by Matilda von Wulffert (1856–1927), a Swedish-Finnish medical student he had met at the Russian Artists' Club. They were married in Chernivtsi in 1882. She was a very outspoken feminist, and devoted to her career, so their temperaments began to clash. In 1892, he asked for a divorce, but she refused. In response, he began an affair with her younger sister, Eugenia. In return, she would not allow him to visit his two daughters until they were adults. She went on to become a prominent dermatologist and medical researcher.

He spent eight months painting in Italy, at a small village outside Naples then, deciding that he could no longer live in Paris, he and Eugenia moved to Liège, Belgium. They continued to travel throughout Western Europe and Russia and, in 1895, he became an honorary member of the Peredvizhniki. In 1901, he acquired an estate in the Minsk Governorate, where he lived and worked until 1906, when he returned to Belgium. He was elected to the Imperial Academy of Arts in 1904. During World War I, he lived in Saint Petersburg until the beginning of the Revolution, then fled to Kuban, where he stayed for a year.

Back in Belgium, he initially lived in De Panne, then moved to Brussels. His eyesight had been failing for several years and he painted little after that. In 1922, he had his last exhibition. A major retrospective was held in 1925.

== Selected landscapes ==
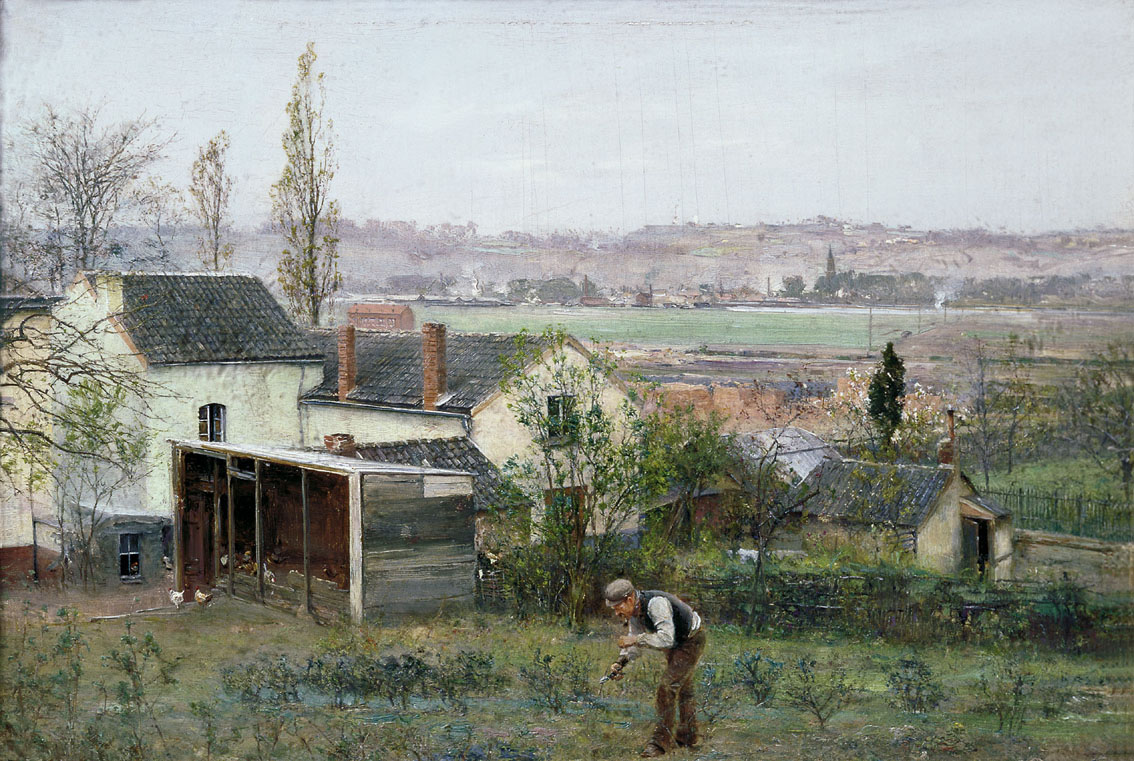
The Gardener

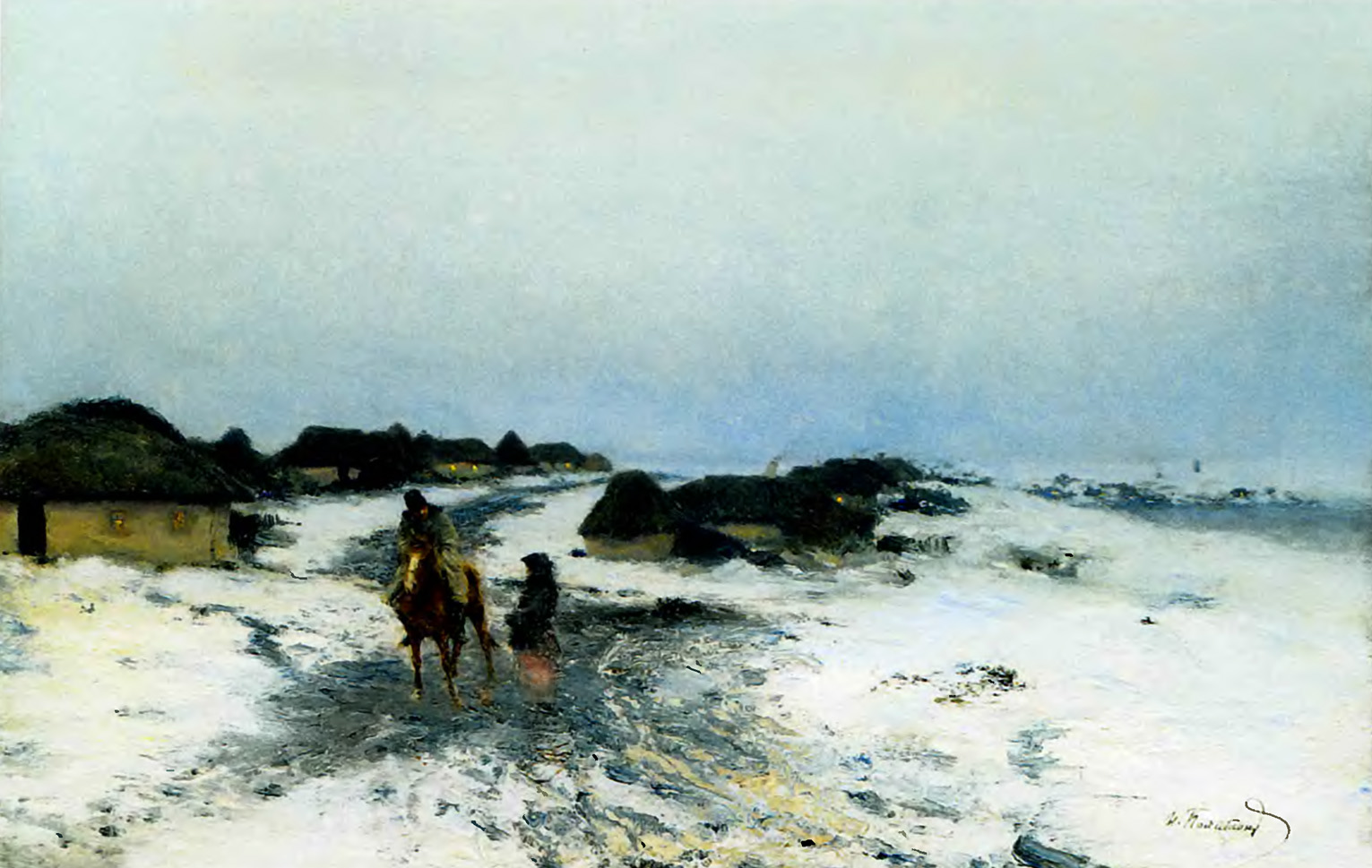
Winter Twilight in Ukraine

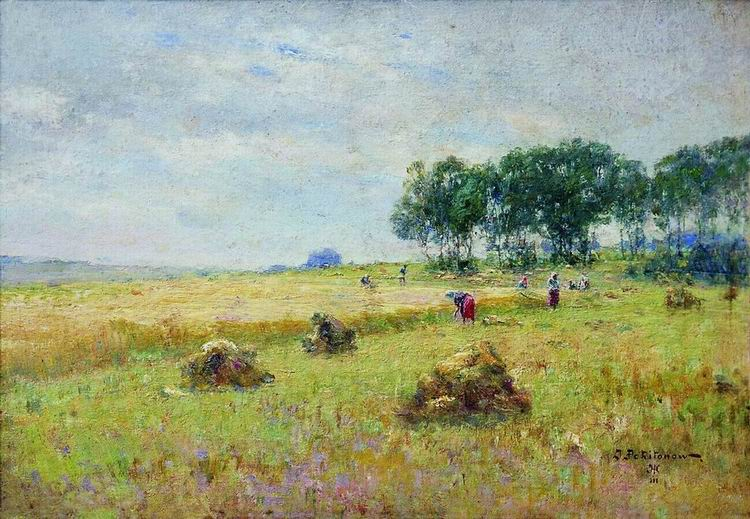
Harvest Time
