= Alexander Neverov =

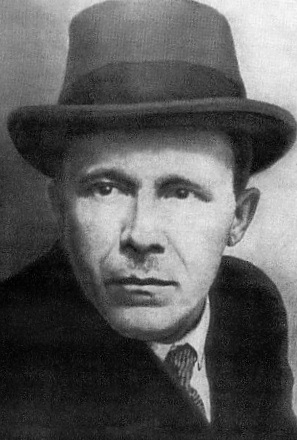
- Born: Alexander Sergeyevich Skobelev; 24 December 1886; Samara Province, Russian Empire
- Died: 24 December 1923 (aged 37); Moscow, Soviet Union
- Resting place: Vagankovo Cemetery, Moscow; 55°46′05″N 37°32′54″E
- Writing career
- Genres: Fiction, drama
- Notable work: City of Bread

Signature
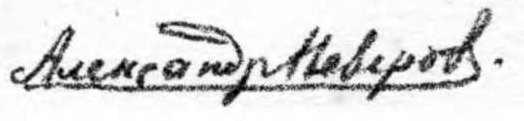

Alexander Sergeyevich Neverov (Russian: Алекса́ндр Серге́евич Неверов; 24 December 1886 – 24 December 1923) was a Russian and Soviet writer and teacher. Neverov was his pseudonym; his real surname was Skobelev (Ско́белев).

== Biography ==
Neverov was born on 20 December 1886 in the village of Novikovka, Melekess, Samara Province. His father was a farmer and a former non-commissioned officer of the Life Guard Lancers, who later left the village and worked as a doorman in the city. Neverov spent his childhood, until the age of 16, living in the home of his grandfather, largely because of his father's military service.

He received his earliest education at a local church school. In 1903, he was accepted at a secondary school in Ozerkino. He graduated after three years of study with a diploma that qualified him as an elementary school teacher. In his third year in Ozerkino, he published his first story in The Temperance Messenger, a St Petersburg newspaper.

After 1906, Neverov worked as a rural teacher while simultaneously publishing stories in magazines. He married in 1912. In 1915, he spent time as a nurse in Samara. During the Revolution, he became friendly with members of the Socialist Revolutionary Party, but in 1919 he joined the Bolsheviks and held significant positions in various institutions in Samara. He was one of the founders of the local folk theatre, and in 1919 he wrote his first plays, one of which, Baba, won first place in a contest in Moscow.

During the famine years of 1920–1921, together with a mass of hungry people, he fled from the Volga Region to Tashkent. In the autumn of 1921, after the death of one of his three children, he conceived a plan to move to Moscow. He travelled first to Tashkent in order to obtain food for his family. This harrowing journey was the inspiration for his novel City of Bread. In the spring of 1922, he moved to Moscow, where he joined the group 'The Forge'. He affiliated himself with a number of revolutionary periodicals, wrote short stories, published his earlier stories in book form, and began work on a novel, Story of Women, which he never finished.

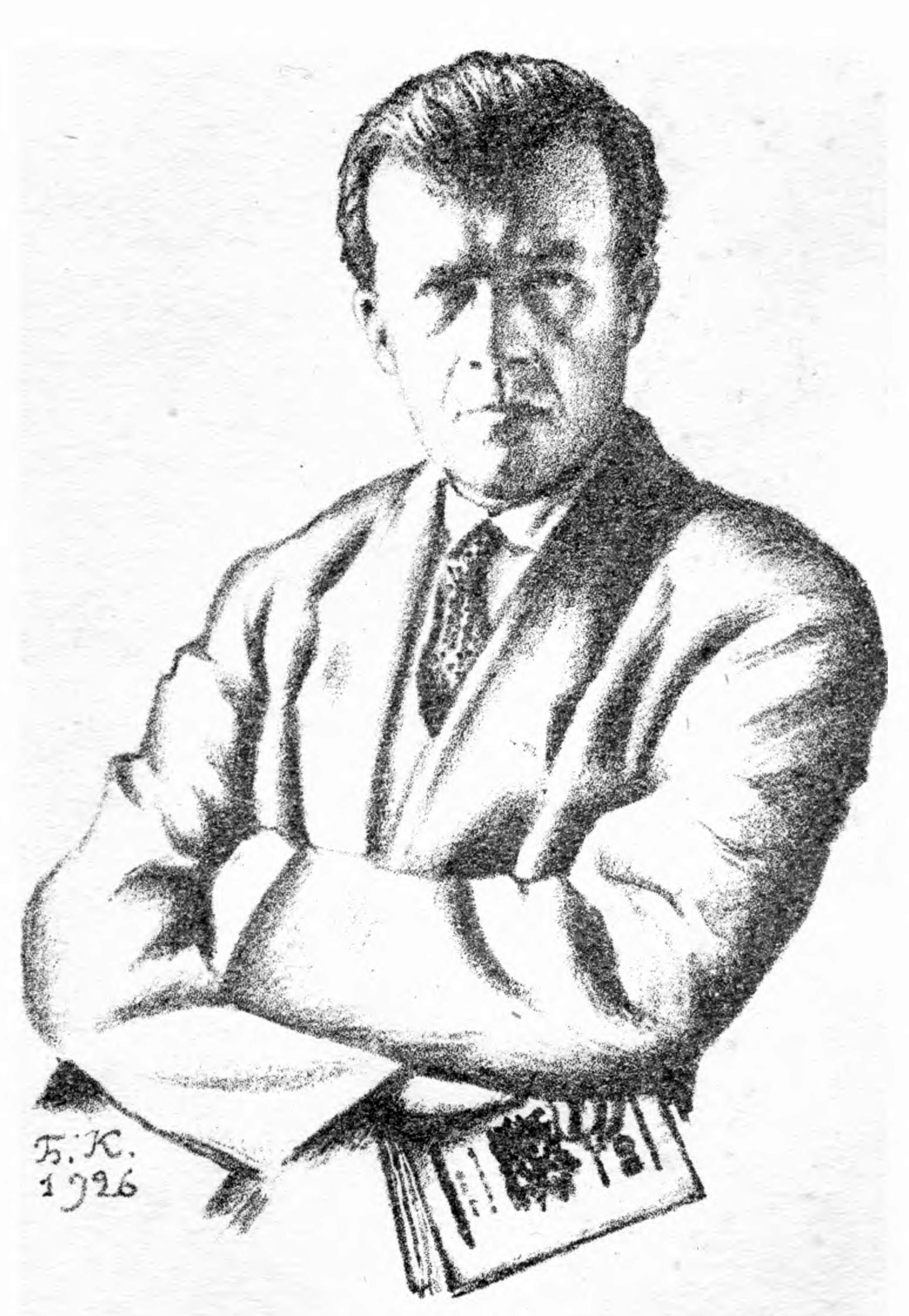
Portrait of Neverov by Boris Kustodiev

Neverov died suddenly of heart failure on 24 December 1923 in Moscow. He was buried at the Vagankovo Cemetery.

His complete works, released in 1926, were reprinted five times before 1930.

The German translation of City of Bread, published as Taschkent, die brotreiche Stadt, was burned by the Nazis during the extensive Nazi book burnings in 1933.

== English translations ==
- Tashkent, (novel), Victor Gollancz, London, 1930. Translated from the Russian by Reginald Merton and W.G. Walton
- City of Bread, (novel), George H. Doran Co, 1927. (Reprinted by Hyperion Press, 1973.)
- The Music and On the Land, (stories), from The Salt Pit, Raduga Publishers, Moscow, 1988.
- Hunger, (story), from Tellers of Tales, Doubleday, Doran & Company, New York, 1939.
