= 1924 Ecuadorian presidential election =

- 16 January 1924
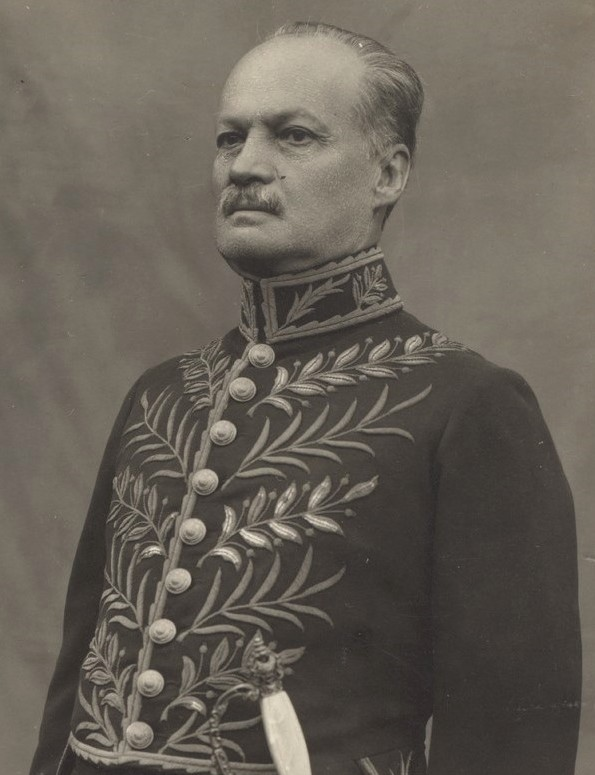

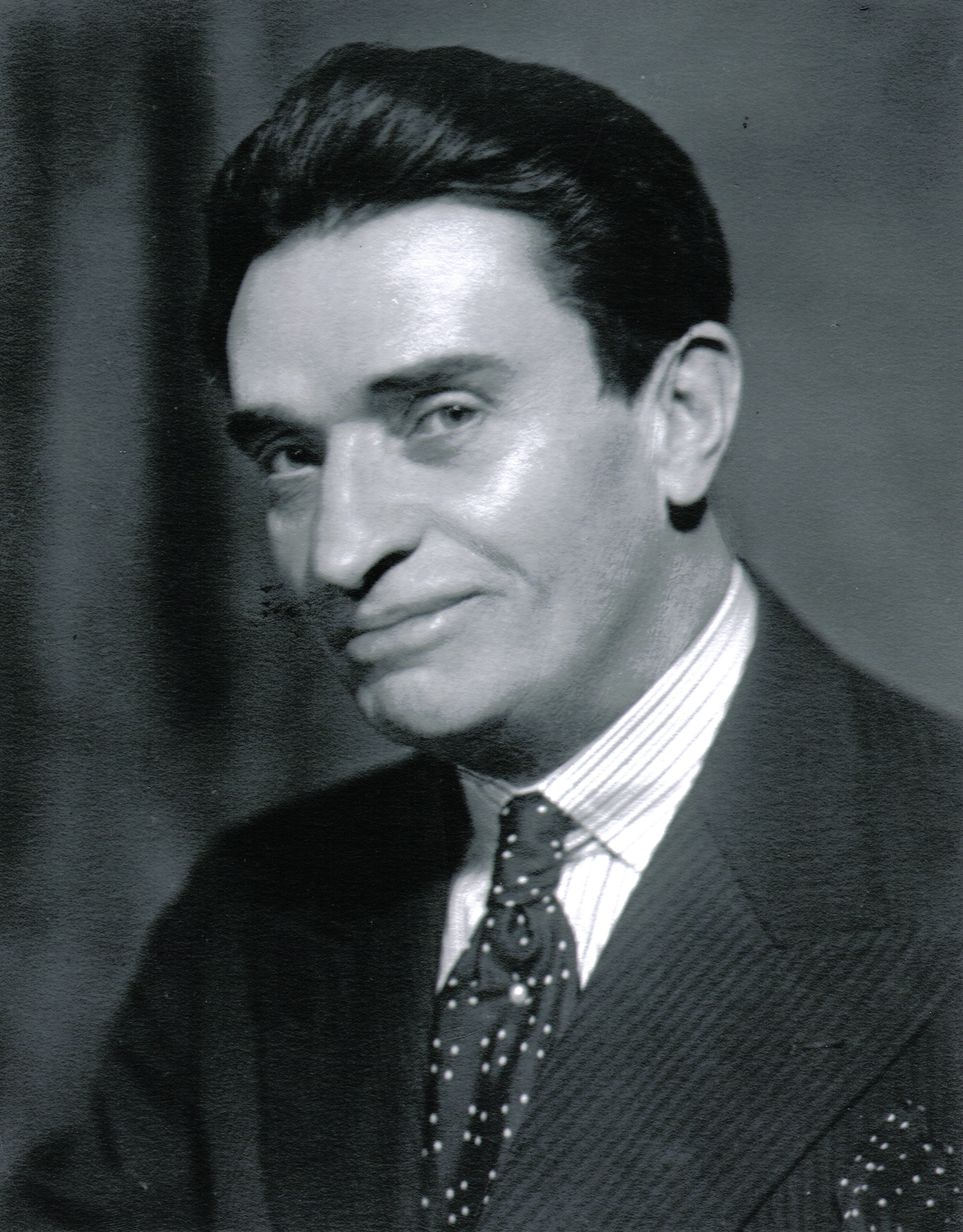
Nominee	Gonzalo Córdova	Juan Manuel Lasso
Party	Liberal	PC
Popular vote	173,773	9,175
Percentage	93.16%	4.92%
President before election
José Luis Tamayo
Liberal
Elected President
Gonzalo Córdova
Liberal

Presidential elections were held in Ecuador on 16 January 1924. The result was a victory for Gonzalo Córdova, who received 93% of the vote.

== Results ==
Candidate	Party	Votes	%
Gonzalo Córdova	Liberal Party	173,773	93.16
Juan Manuel Lasso	Conservative Party	9,175	4.92
Federico Intriago	Liberal Party	3,454	1.85
Other candidates		136	0.07
Total		186,538	100.00
Source: Nohlen, TSE
