= Albert Katz =

German writer (1858–1923)

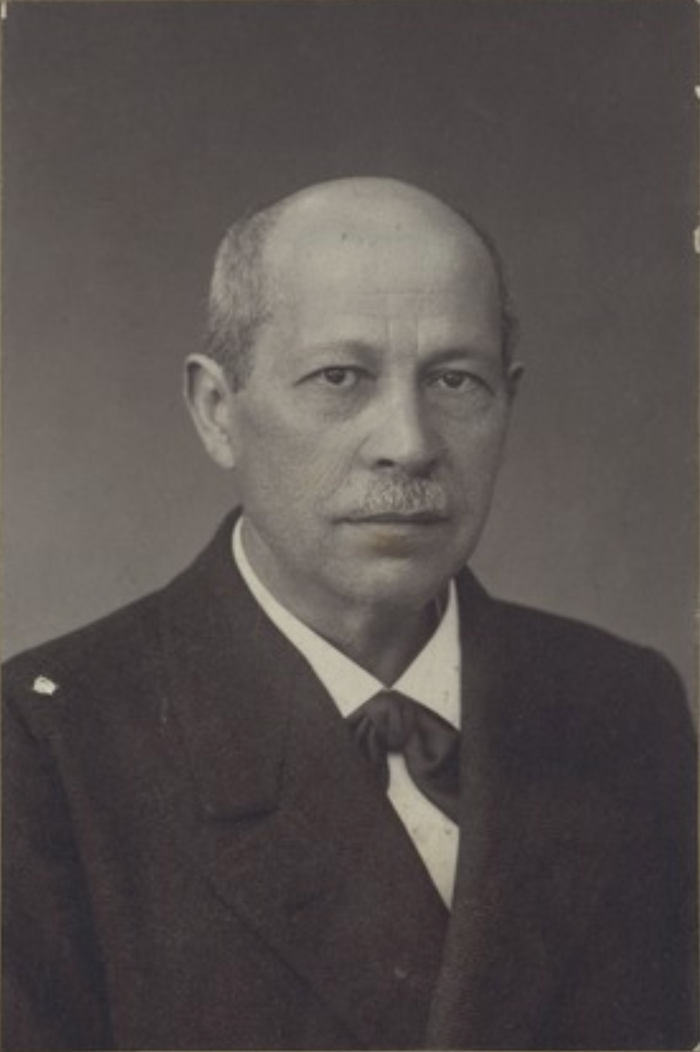
- Born: Abraham Albert Katz; 17 July 1858; Lodz, Congress Poland
- Died: 16 December 1923 (aged 65); Berlin, Weimar Republic
- Resting place: Weißensee Cemetery
- Spouse: Bertha Braunstein
- Writing career
- Pen name: Ish ha-Ruaḥ
- Language: German, Hebrew

Albert Katz (Hebrew: אברהם אלברט כ״ץ; 17 July 1858 – 16 December 1923), also known by the pen name Ish ha-Ruaḥ (Hebrew: איש הרוח), was a Polish-born rabbi, writer, and journalist.

== Biography ==
Albert Katz was born in Lodz, and studied at the yeshivot of Lublin and Vilna before moving to Berlin in 1881. He served as a rabbi in Fürstenwalde from April 1883 to 1886, and for Congregation Ohel Yitzḥak in Berlin from April 1886 to 1887. From 1887 he devoted himself exclusively to writing.

Together with Willy Bambus, Katz founded the periodical Serubabel (1886–88), which promoted Jewish settlement in Israel. In 1890 he was hired as editor of the Allgemeine Zeitung des Judentums, eventually becoming its chief editor in 1919. He was also one of the founders of the Vereine für jüdische Literatur und Geschichte of Berlin, and of the Verband der Literatur-Vereine in Hanover (1894), and served as the latter's secretary.

He died on 16 December 1923 at his apartment in Pankow, Berlin, and was buried at the Weißensee Cemetery

== Works ==
- Ha-Ivri ve-eretz avotav [The Jew and the Country of His Fathers] (in Hebrew). Berlin. 1883. Published in German as Der Jude und das Land seiner Väter.
- Die Seele des jüdischen Volkes. Fürstenwalde: H. Richter. 1886.
- Die Blutlüge. Efes damim.German. Berlin: Hugo Schildberger. 1892. hdl:2027/nnc1.cu58943420. Translation of I. B. Levinson's Efes Damim.
- Der wahre Talmudjude. Berlin: Emil Apolant. 1893. Response to August Rohling's anti-Jewish work Der Talmudjude (1871).
- Die Juden im Kaukasus. Berlin. 1894.
- "Eine Humoreske". Populär-Wissenschaftliche Monatsblätter zur Belehrung über das Judenthum für Gebildete aller Konfessionen. 14 (7–8). 1894.
- Aus alter und neuer Zeit. Erzählungen aus dem Leben der Juden in Polen. Prague: Jakob B. Brandeis. 1896. A collection of stories including Eine Wette, Der Car und der Rabbi, David und Jonathan (adapted from a story by I. L. Peretz), and Der Fasttag.
- Die Juden in China. Berlin: A. Katz. 1900.
- Der Chassidismus. Berlin: M. Poppelauer. 1904.
- Biographische Charakterbilder aus der jüdischen Geschichte und Sage. Berlin: Verlag für moderne Literatur. 1905. Biographical sketches of Tannaitic scholars.
- Christen und Juden als Förderer der hebräischen Sprache und Literatur. Berlin: M. Poppelauer. 1907.
- "Aus dem Leben eines Knaben. Bearbeitet nahc einer Erzählung von Scholem Aleichem". Jüdische Presse. 39 (48–50). 1907.
- Jossele. Aus dem polnisch-jüdischen Jargon nach einer Erzählung von Jakob Dineson frei bearbeitet. Leipzig: Gustav Engel. 1910. Adapted from a story by Jacob Dinezon.
- "Esra". Jahrbuch für jüdische Geschichte und Literatur. 13. Verbande der Vereine für Jüdische Geschichte und Literatur in Deutschland: 68–88. 1910.
- "Der Sonnenstich / Pharaos Erben". Jahrbuch für jüdische Geschichte und Literatur. 16. Verbande der Vereine für Jüdische Geschichte und Literatur in Deutschland: 228–268. 1913.
- Israels Feste und Gedenktage. Leipzig: Gustav Engel. 1921. Collection of twenty-seven homiletic essays.
