= Vypolzovo =

Vypolzovo (Russian: Выползово) is the name of several rural localities in Russia.

== Altai Krai ==
As of 2012, one rural locality in Altai Krai bears this name:

- Vypolzovo, Altai Krai, a selo in Lugovskoy Selsoviet of Talmensky District; 53°50′N 83°44′E

== Arkhangelsk Oblast ==
As of 2012, two rural localities in Arkhangelsk Oblast bear this name:

- Vypolzovo, Kotlassky District, Arkhangelsk Oblast, a village in Koryazhemsky Selsoviet of Kotlassky District
- Vypolzovo, Vilegodsky District, Arkhangelsk Oblast, a village in Ilyinsky Selsoviet of Vilegodsky District

== Belgorod Oblast ==
As of 2012, one rural locality in Belgorod Oblast bears this name:

- Vypolzovo, Belgorod Oblast, a selo in Starooskolsky District

== Bryansk Oblast ==
As of 2012, one rural locality in Bryansk Oblast bears this name:

- Vypolzovo, Bryansk Oblast, a selo in Usokhsky Rural Administrative Okrug of Trubchevsky District; 52°42′N 33°49′E

== Ivanovo Oblast ==
As of 2012, two rural localities in Ivanovo Oblast bear this name:

- Vypolzovo, Ilyinsky District, Ivanovo Oblast, a village in Ilyinsky District
- Vypolzovo, Rodnikovsky District, Ivanovo Oblast, a village in Rodnikovsky District

== Kaluga Oblast ==
As of 2012, two rural localities in Kaluga Oblast bear this name:

- Vypolzovo, Kirovsky District, Kaluga Oblast, a village in Kirovsky District
- Vypolzovo, Yukhnovsky District, Kaluga Oblast, a village in Yukhnovsky District

== Kirov Oblast ==
As of 2012, three rural localities in Kirov Oblast bear this name:

- Vypolzovo, Podosinovsky District, Kirov Oblast, a village under the administrative jurisdiction of Podosinovets Urban-Type Settlement in Podosinovsky District
- Vypolzovo, Sanchursky District, Kirov Oblast, a village in Gorodishchensky Rural Okrug of Sanchursky District
- Vypolzovo, Uninsky District, Kirov Oblast, a village in Porezsky Rural Okrug of Uninsky District

== Kostroma Oblast ==
As of 2012, six rural localities in Kostroma Oblast bear this name:

- Vypolzovo, Dmitriyevskoye Settlement, Galichsky District, Kostroma Oblast, a village in Dmitriyevskoye Settlement of Galichsky District
- Vypolzovo, Orekhovskoye Settlement, Galichsky District, Kostroma Oblast, a village in Orekhovskoye Settlement of Galichsky District
- Vypolzovo, Orekhovskoye Settlement, Galichsky District, Kostroma Oblast, a village in Orekhovskoye Settlement of Galichsky District
- Vypolzovo, Manturovsky District, Kostroma Oblast, a village in Leontyevskoye Settlement of Manturovsky District
- Vypolzovo, Sharyinsky District, Kostroma Oblast, a village in Shangskoye Settlement of Sharyinsky District
- Vypolzovo, Vokhomsky District, Kostroma Oblast, a village in Lapshinskoye Settlement of Vokhomsky District

== Kursk Oblast ==
As of 2012, one rural locality in Kursk Oblast bears this name:

- Vypolzovo, Kursk Oblast, a selo in Vypolzovsky Selsoviet of Solntsevsky District

== Leningrad Oblast ==
As of 2012, one rural locality in Leningrad Oblast bears this name:

- Vypolzovo, Leningrad Oblast, a village in Domozhirovskoye Settlement Municipal Formation of Lodeynopolsky District

== Lipetsk Oblast ==
As of 2012, one rural locality in Lipetsk Oblast bears this name:

- Vypolzovo, Lipetsk Oblast, a village in Sotnikovsky Selsoviet of Krasninsky District

== Mari El Republic ==
As of 2012, one rural locality in the Mari El Republic bears this name:

- Vypolzovo, Mari El Republic, a village in Azanovsky Rural Okrug of Medvedevsky District

== Nizhny Novgorod Oblast ==
As of 2012, five rural localities in Nizhny Novgorod Oblast bear this name:

- Vypolzovo, Bor, Nizhny Novgorod Oblast, a village in Krasnoslobodsky Selsoviet under the administrative jurisdiction of the town of oblast significance of Bor
- Vypolzovo, Ardatovsky District, Nizhny Novgorod Oblast, a selo in Lichadeyevsky Selsoviet of Ardatovsky District
- Vypolzovo, Bogorodsky District, Nizhny Novgorod Oblast, a village in Shapkinsky Selsoviet of Bogorodsky District
- Vypolzovo, Dalnekonstantinovsky District, Nizhny Novgorod Oblast, a village in Malopitsky Selsoviet of Dalnekonstantinovsky District
- Vypolzovo, Shatkovsky District, Nizhny Novgorod Oblast, a selo in Sharapovsky Selsoviet of Shatkovsky District

== Novgorod Oblast ==
As of 2012, one rural locality in Novgorod Oblast bears this name:

- Vypolzovo, Novgorod Oblast, a village in Polavskoye Settlement of Parfinsky District

== Perm Krai ==
As of 2012, one rural locality in Perm Krai bears this name:

- Vypolzovo, Perm Krai, a village in Kungursky District

== Pskov Oblast ==
As of 2012, one rural locality in Pskov Oblast bears this name:

- Vypolzovo, Pskov Oblast, a village in Plyussky District

== Ryazan Oblast ==
As of 2012, two rural localities in Ryazan Oblast bear this name:

- Vypolzovo, Kadomsky District, Ryazan Oblast, a village in Novoselsky Rural Okrug of Kadomsky District
- Vypolzovo, Spassky District, Ryazan Oblast, a selo in Vypolzovsky Rural Okrug of Spassky District

== Samara Oblast ==
As of 2012, one rural locality in Samara Oblast bears this name:

- Vypolzovo, Samara Oblast, a selo in Volzhsky District

== Smolensk Oblast ==
As of 2012, one rural locality in Smolensk Oblast bears this name:

- Vypolzovo, Smolensk Oblast, a village in Kaydakovskoye Rural Settlement of Vyazemsky District

== Tula Oblast ==
As of 2012, one rural locality in Tula Oblast bears this name:

- Vypolzovo, Tula Oblast, a village in Velyenikolskaya Rural Administration of Chernsky District

== Tver Oblast ==
As of 2012, three rural localities in Tver Oblast bear this name:

- Vypolzovo, Andreapolsky District, Tver Oblast, a village in Volokskoye Rural Settlement of Andreapolsky District
- Vypolzovo, Bologovsky District, Tver Oblast, a settlement in Vypolzovskoye Rural Settlement of Bologovsky District
- Vypolzovo, Kalyazinsky District, Tver Oblast, a village in Nerlskoye Rural Settlement of Kalyazinsky District

== Ulyanovsk Oblast ==
As of 2012, one rural locality in Ulyanovsk Oblast bears this name:

- Vypolzovo, Ulyanovsk Oblast, a selo in Nikitinsky Rural Okrug of Sursky District

== Vladimir Oblast ==
As of 2012, three rural localities in Vladimir Oblast bear this name:

- Vypolzovo, Melenkovsky District, Vladimir Oblast, a village in Melenkovsky District
- Vypolzovo, Petushinsky District, Vladimir Oblast, a village in Petushinsky District
- Vypolzovo, Yuryev-Polsky District, Vladimir Oblast, a village in Yuryev-Polsky District

== Vologda Oblast ==
As of 2012, five rural localities in Vologda Oblast bear this name:

- Vypolzovo, Babayevsky District, Vologda Oblast, a village in Volodinsky Selsoviet of Babayevsky District
- Vypolzovo, Kichmengsko-Gorodetsky District, Vologda Oblast, a village in Nizhneyenangsky Selsoviet of Kichmengsko-Gorodetsky District
- Vypolzovo, Sokolsky District, Vologda Oblast, a village in Prigorodny Selsoviet of Sokolsky District
- Vypolzovo, Ustyuzhensky District, Vologda Oblast, a village in Nikiforovsky Selsoviet of Ustyuzhensky District
- Vypolzovo, Velikoustyugsky District, Vologda Oblast, a village in Nizhneyerogodsky Selsoviet of Velikoustyugsky District

== Yaroslavl Oblast ==
As of 2012, six rural localities in Yaroslavl Oblast bear this name:

- Vypolzovo, Danilovsky District, Yaroslavl Oblast, a village in Semivragovsky Rural Okrug of Danilovsky District
- Vypolzovo, Pereslavsky District, Yaroslavl Oblast, a village in Zagoryevsky Rural Okrug of Pereslavsky District
- Vypolzovo, Poshekhonsky District, Yaroslavl Oblast, a village in Leninsky Rural Okrug of Poshekhonsky District
- Vypolzovo, Rostovsky District, Yaroslavl Oblast, a village in Sulostsky Rural Okrug of Rostovsky District
- Vypolzovo, Tutayevsky District, Yaroslavl Oblast, a village in Pomogalovsky Rural Okrug of Tutayevsky District
- Vypolzovo, Uglichsky District, Yaroslavl Oblast, a village in Nikolsky Rural Okrug of Uglichsky District
