= Sophia Ivanovna Kramskaya =

Russian artist (1866–1933)

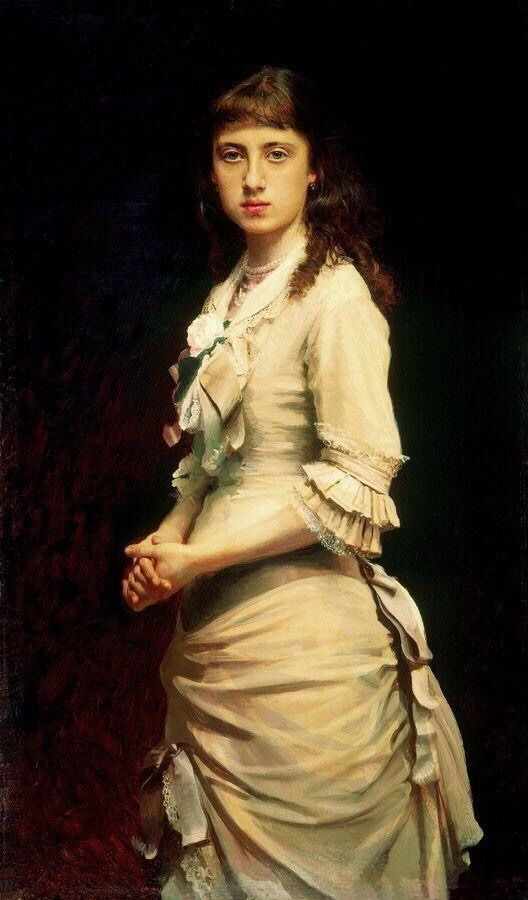
- Portrait by Ivan Kramskoi, 1882, oils; Russian Museum
- Born: 2 September [O.S. 21 August] 1867; Vypolzovo, Vladimir Governorate, Russian Empire
- Died: 1933 (aged 65–66); Leningrad, Soviet Union
- Known for: Painting
- Movement: Realism
- Spouse: George Junker (m. 1901; died 1916)

Sophia Ivanovna Kramskaya, known per marriage as Junker-Kramskaya (2 September 1867 – 1933) was a Russian painter during the Belle Époque, active in St. Petersburg, known for her portraits.

== Biography ==
Sophia Ivanovna Kramskaya was born on 2 September 1867 in Vypolzovo, a village in Pereslavsky Uyezd, Vladimir Governorate, the daughter of the prominent Realist painter Ivan Kramskoi. At the time of her birth, the Kramskoi family were spending the summer at the estate of her father's friend and fellow painter Mikhail Tulinov. While attending a private women's gymnasium, the teenage Kramskaya began to study painting under her father, who had recognised her artistic talents and sought to foster her abilities. Kramskaya, like her father, specialised in portrait painting in the Realism style. A portrait of Ivan Kramskoi, painted shortly before his sudden death in 1887, was one of her earliest works. After her father's death, she took drawing and painting lessons from Alexander Litovchenko, Alexander Sokolov, and Arkhip Kuindzhi. Kramskaya became engaged to Sergey Sergeyevich Botkin, the eldest son of Sergey Botkin, but engagement broke down.

By 1888, Kramskaya was participating in many exhibitions in both Russia and abroad, with her success leading to a steady amount of commissions, mainly from the Russian upper class. In the early 1890s, Kramskaya attended a private painting school in Paris, where she was supervised by the sculptor Mark Antokolsky. Kramskaya exhibited her work at the Woman's Building at the 1893 World's Columbian Exposition in Chicago, Illinois.

Kramskaya was married to George Junker, a lawyer in Saint Petersburg, from 1901 until his death in 1916. She adopted the name Sophia Ivanovna Junker-Kramskaya (Софья Ивановна Юнкер-Крамская) for the remainder of her life.

Following the Russian Revolution, Kramskaya was employed in the art and reproduction workshop at a publishing house. From 1925 to 1930, she was involved in the organization of the Anti-Religious Museum in the Winter Palace, illustrated "The History of Religions" for the publishing house Ateist in Moscow. However, Kramskaya was a religion person, arranged jobs for former nobles and officers of the Imperial Russian Army, and got them money transfers to earn money.

In 1931, Kramskaya was arrested, sentenced for three years for "counter-revolutionary propaganda, and spent two years in exile in Siberia. Shortly after her conviction, she suffered from a stroke which delayed her deportation to Siberia. Kramskaya first ended up in Irkutsk, where she illustrated textbooks and collective farm magazines. In Kansk she worked as a photographer and retoucher in a local newspaper. She relocated to Krasnoyarsk but suffered a second stroke which partially paralysed her left side. Kramskaya wrote to Yekaterina Peshkova asking for assistance after she had fully recovered in Krasnoyarsk, but her health led to her sentence being reviewed as she was no longer considered a "social danger." In March 1932, Kramskaya was released early and returned to Leningrad (Saint Petersburg) where she died in 1933. She was officially rehabilitated by the Soviet government in September 1989.

Kramskaya's painting Girl in the Kokoshnik is in the collection of the Hermitage Museum in Saint Petersburg.

== Gallery ==
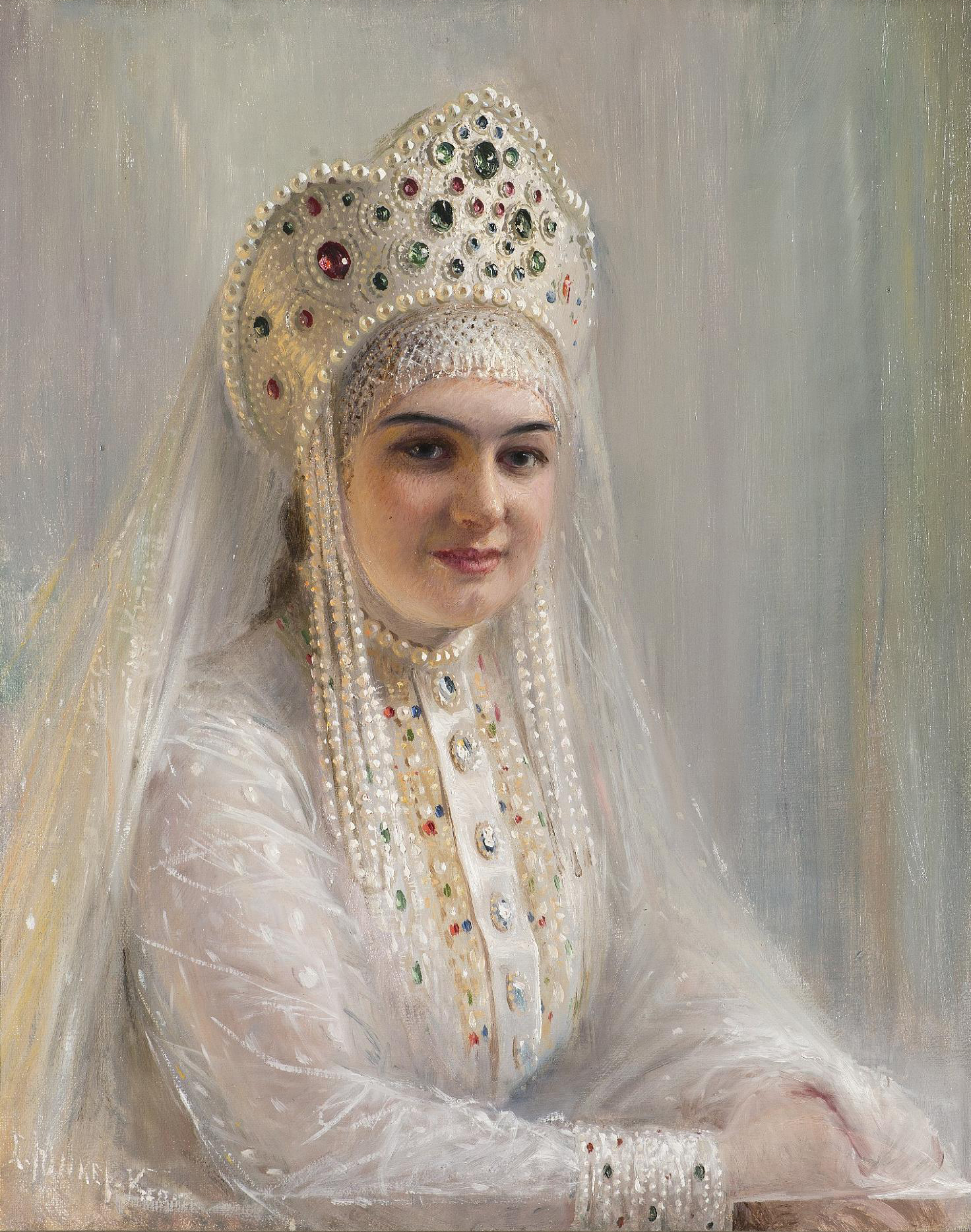
Girl in the Kokoshnik

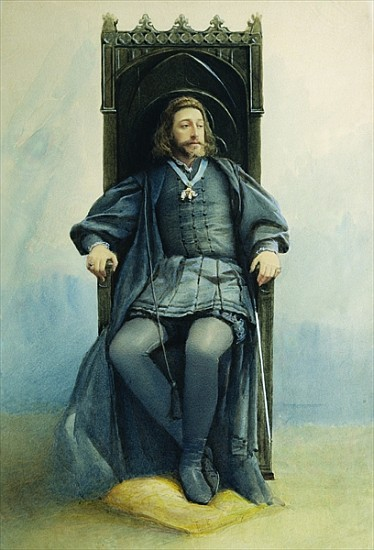
Grand Duke Konstantin Konstantinovich

The Sleeping Woman
