= Pyotr Sokolov (portraitist) =

Russian painter (1791–1848)

- Пётр Соколов
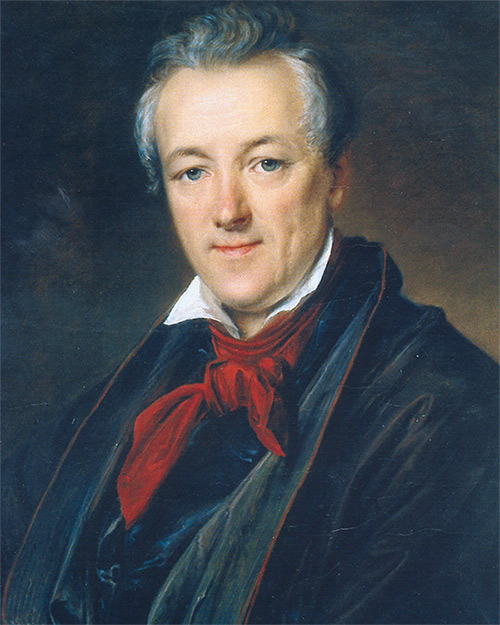
- Portrait by Vasily Tropinin, 1833, oils; Russian Museum
- Born: 1791; Moscow, Russian Empire
- Died: 3 August 1848 (aged 56–57); Merchik, Kharkov Governorate, Russian Empire
- Education: Imperial Academy of Arts (1810)
- Known for: Watercolor painting
- Style: Academism
- Spouse: Julie Brüllo (m. 1820)
- Children: five, including Pyotr (1821–1899), Pavel (1826–1905), and Aleksandr (1829–1913)
- Elected: Member Academy of Arts (1839)

Pyotr Fyodorovich Sokolov (Russian: Пётр Фёдорович Соколов; 1787 – 15 August [O.S. 3 August] 1848) was a Russian painter and draughtsman, active in St. Petersburg and Moscow during Tsars Alexander I and Nicholas I's reigns, best known for his watercolor portraits. The first watercolorist to be elected an Imperial Academician, he painted many of the most distinguished figures of the Pushkin era. Along his sons Pyotr, Pavel and Aleksandr, all fellow artisans, he was an in-law to the extended Bryullov family.

== Early life ==
Sokolov was born in Moscow, and between the years of 1800 to 1809 he attended the Imperial Academy of Arts where he studied with Alexei Yegorov and Vasily Shebuyev who both were very famous and respected artists. In 1809, Sokolov painted "Andromache Mourning Hector" ("Андромаха оплакивает убитого Гектора") for his alma mater's competition, receiving a minor gold medal as well as the title of "Artist". As part of the Academy's offerings, the students who won the major gold medal were also awarded a stipend to go abroad to enhance their education. Sokolov wanted to continue his education in Italy, so he stayed in school for one more year and participated in the contest again, but he did not manage to achieve this goal.

== Career ==
Sokolov captured numerous people in his portraits, starting with fellow artists and ending with veterans of the Patriotic War of 1812. Amongst those people individuals such as Alexander Pushkin and Vasily Zhukovsky, who were famous Russian poets, were included as well. Additionally, Sokolov received many commissions from various high-ranking persons. For example, the artist was invited by the imperial family to Anichkov Palace where he painted a portrait of Nicholas I of Russia's three-year-old son, Alexander, and the work was a success with the family.

Some of Sokolov's commissioners repeatedly requested works from him. One of the people who were painted three times was Ekaterina Pavlovna Bakunina. She was depicted in the years 1816, 1828 and 1834. In her first portrait which was done in pencil, she is depicted as a youthful lady. In the aquarelle work of 1828, Sokolov managed to convey the features that were socially desirable and attractive at that time in her portrait. As for the 1834 portrait, one can easily see how Sokolov depicted Bakunina (now Poltoratskaya) as a married woman.

Over the course of his life he created over 500 artworks, and not only are they found in private collections, since they are extremely valuable, but also in famous government museums such as the State Russian Museum, the State Tretyakov Gallery, and many others.

== Technique ==
Sokolov was one of the first to employ a special watercolour technique where emulsion was not utilized, In addition to that, he was the person who has started the genre of the aquarelle portraiture in Russian art. From 1820 and onwards, he completely involved himself in perfecting his art form in which he succeeded. This technique in the years between 1820 and 1840 managed to replace the portrait miniatures that were popular in Russia prior to that. Even though Sokolov specialized in watercolor painting, oftentimes he would use a graphite pencil in order to manage his initial draft, as well as an aid for special effects to enhance his artworks.

== Selected portraits ==
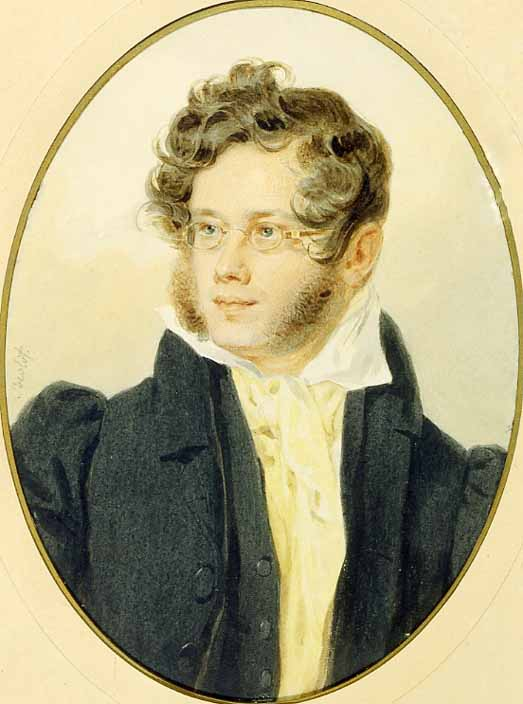
Prince Pyotr Vyazemsky, 1824

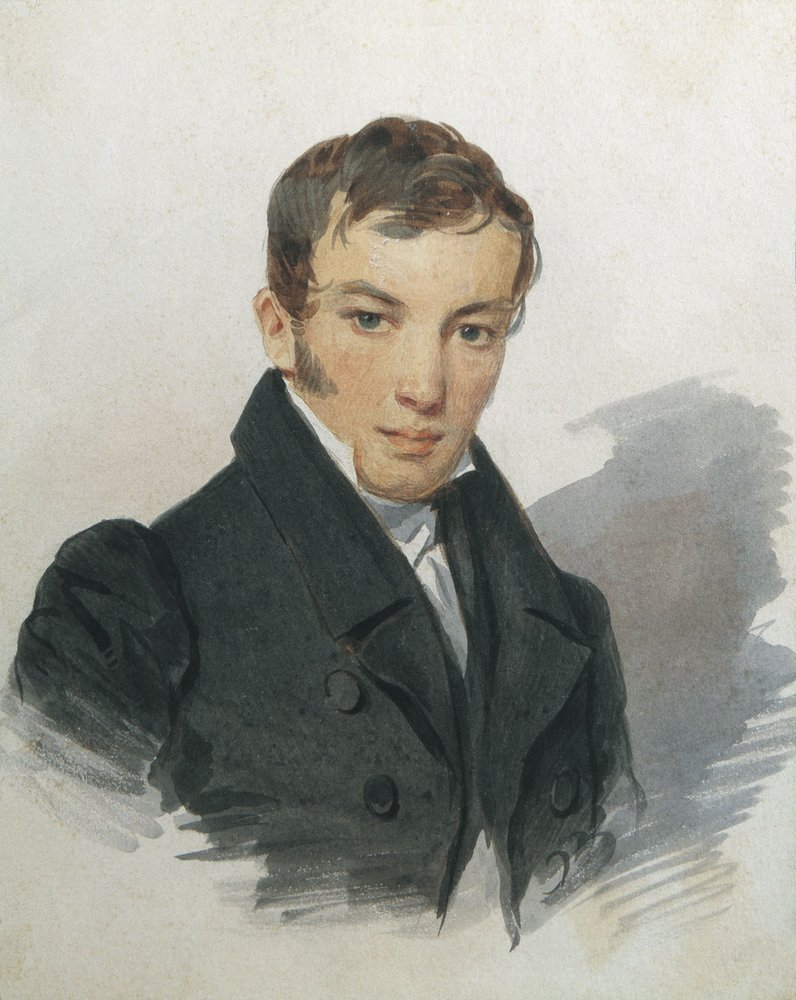
Vasily Zhukovsky, 1820s

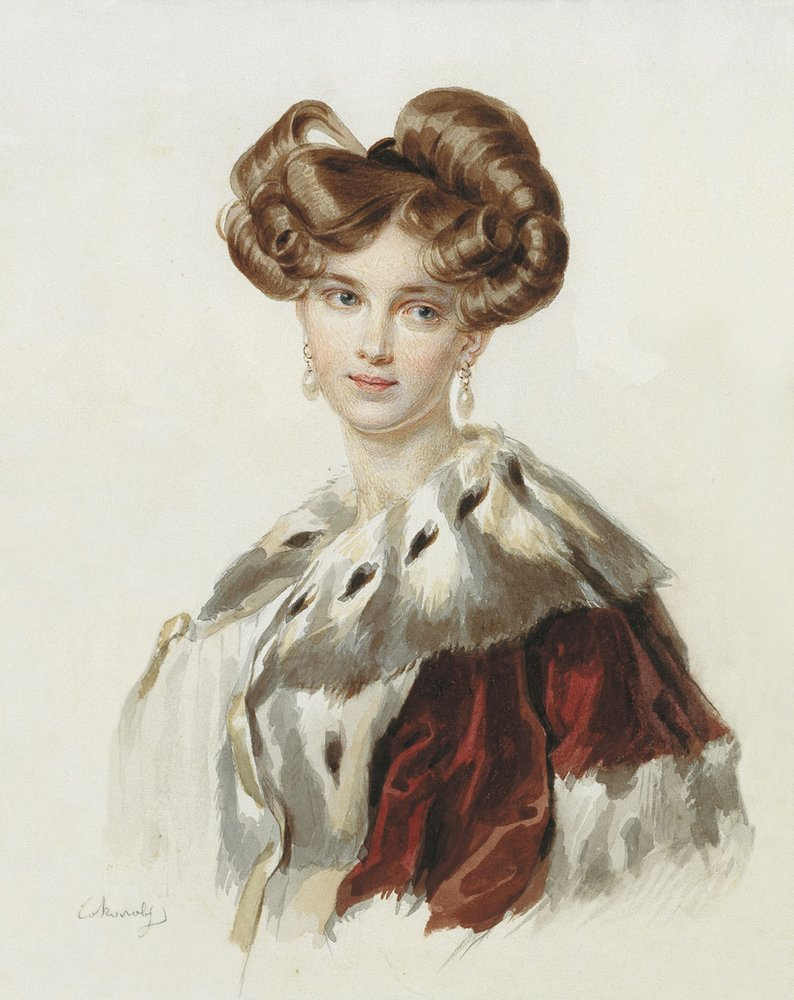
Portrait of a Noblewoman, believed to be Idalia Poletika, c. 1825–1830

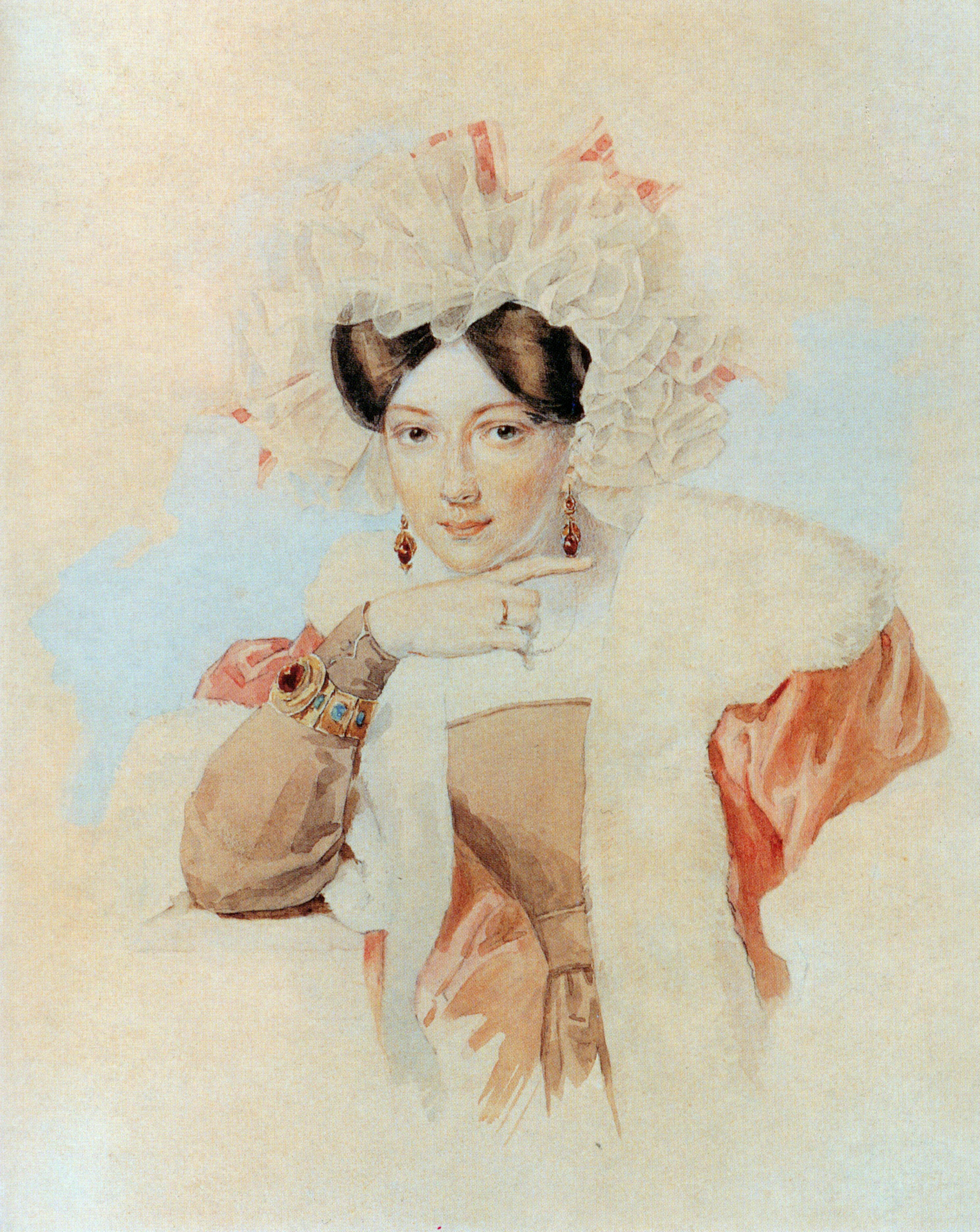
Yulia Sokolova (née Julie Brüllo), the painter's spouse, c. 1827

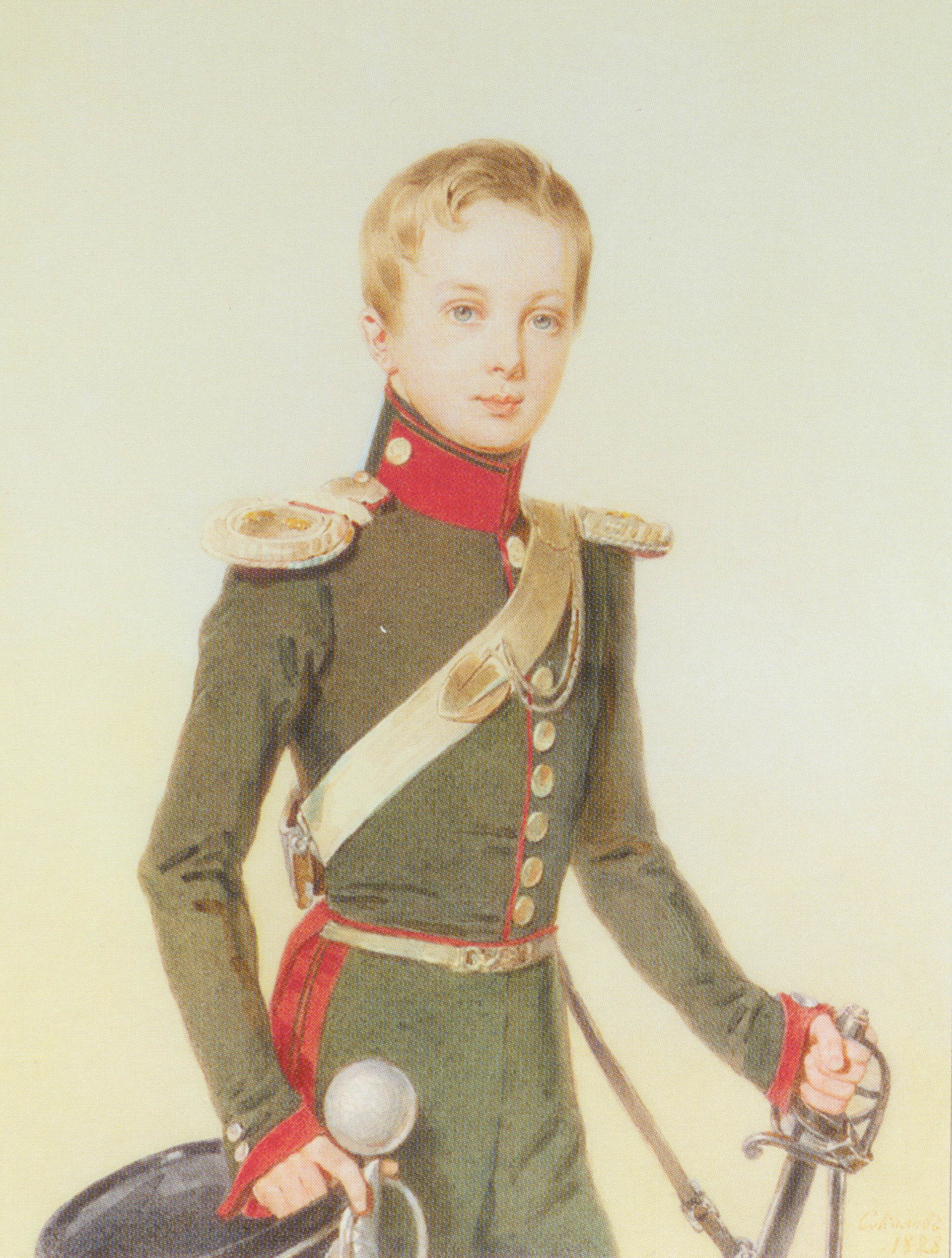
Grand Duke Alexander Nikolayevich, 1828

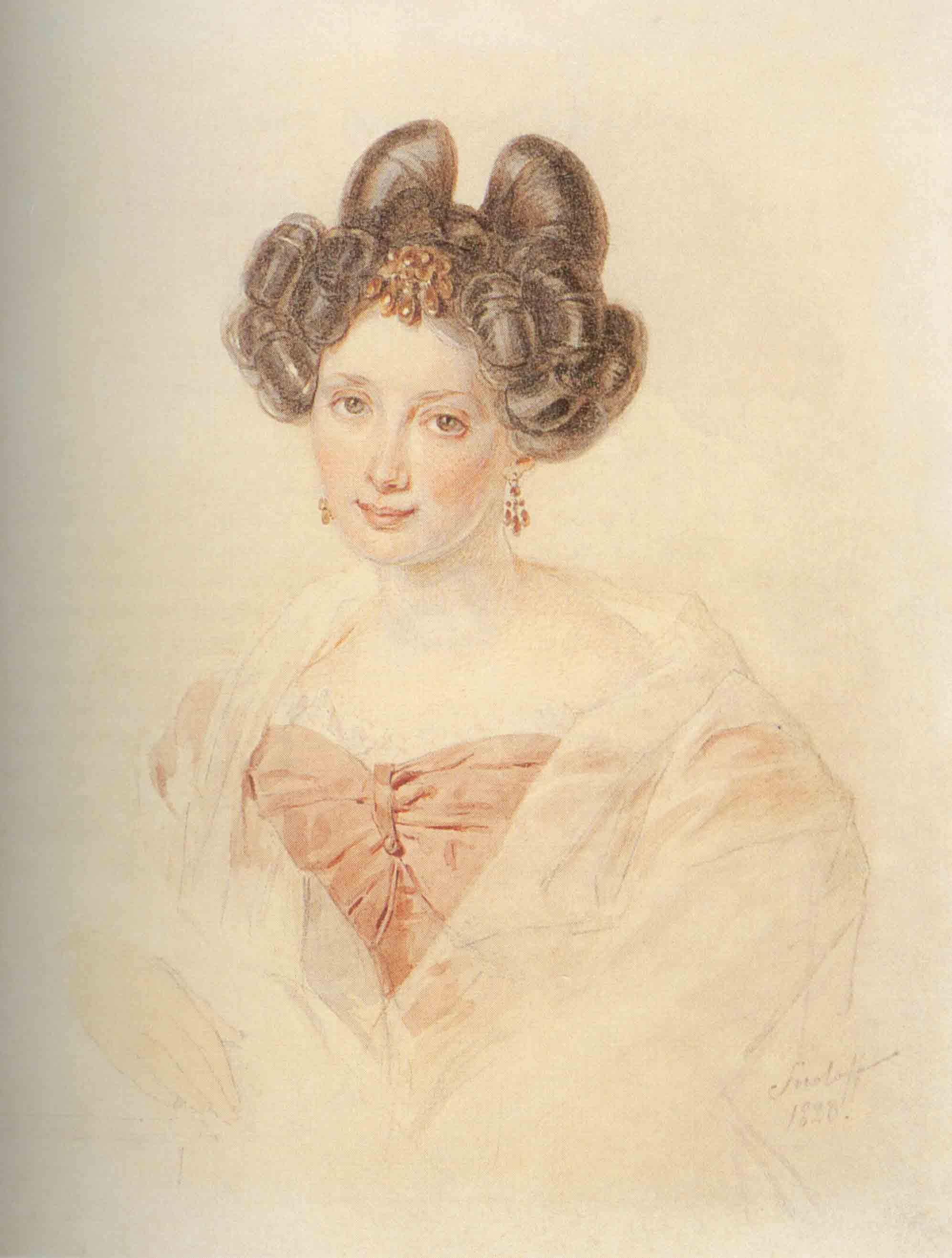
Yekaterina Bakunina, 1828

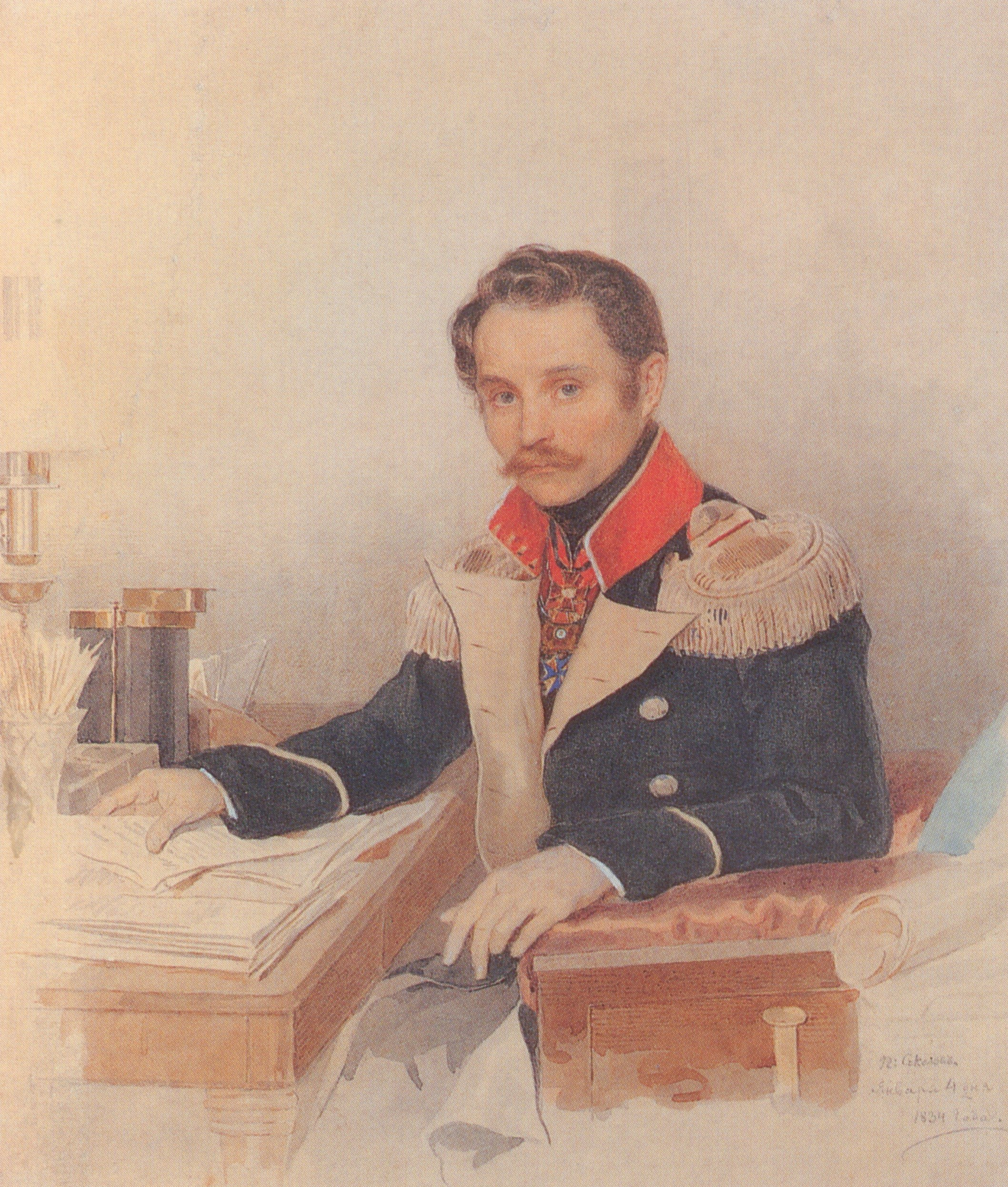
Leontiy Dubbelt, 1834

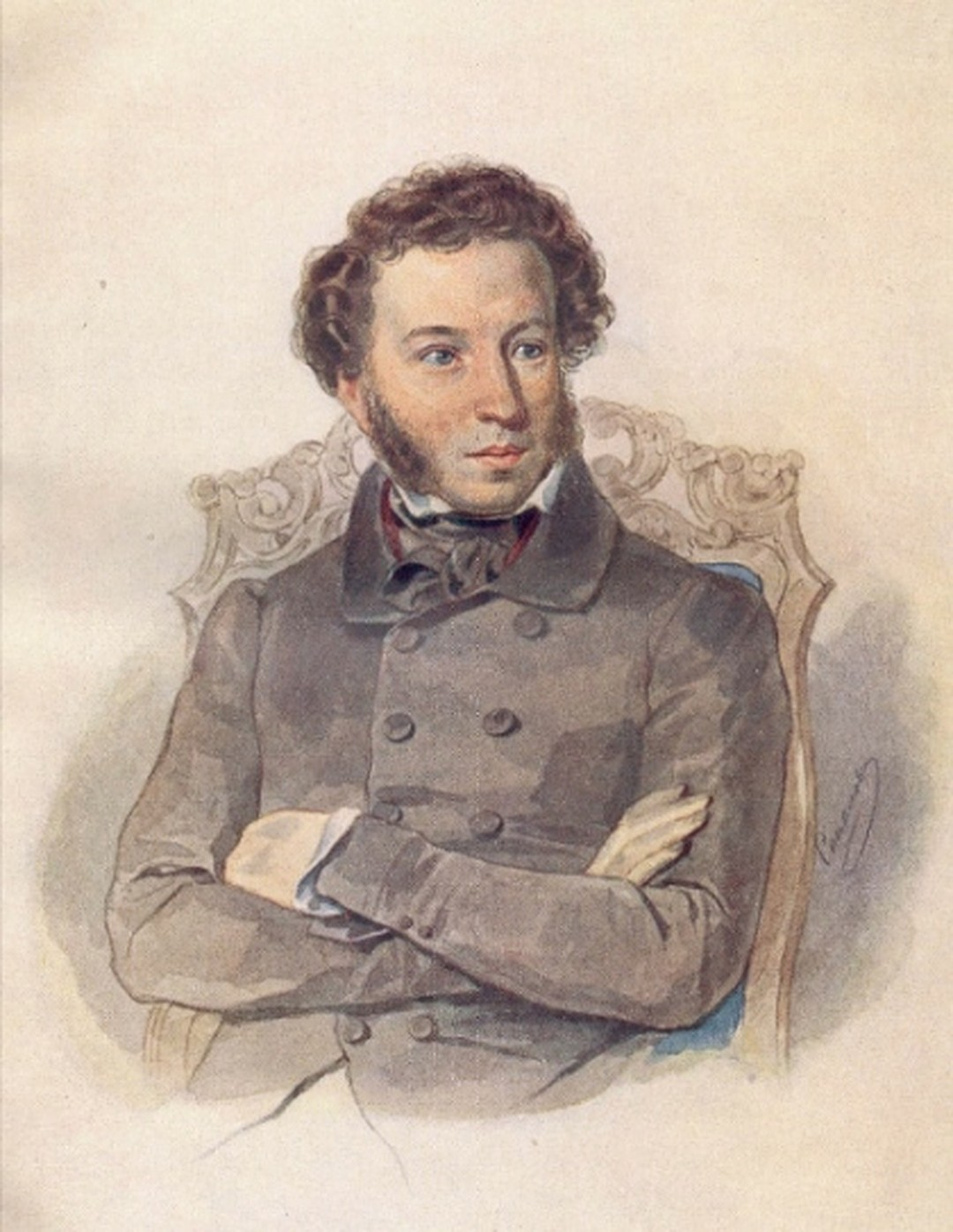
Alexander Pushkin, c. 1836–1841

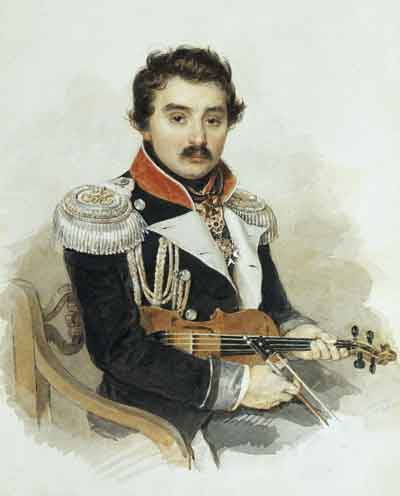
Alexei Lvov, 1836

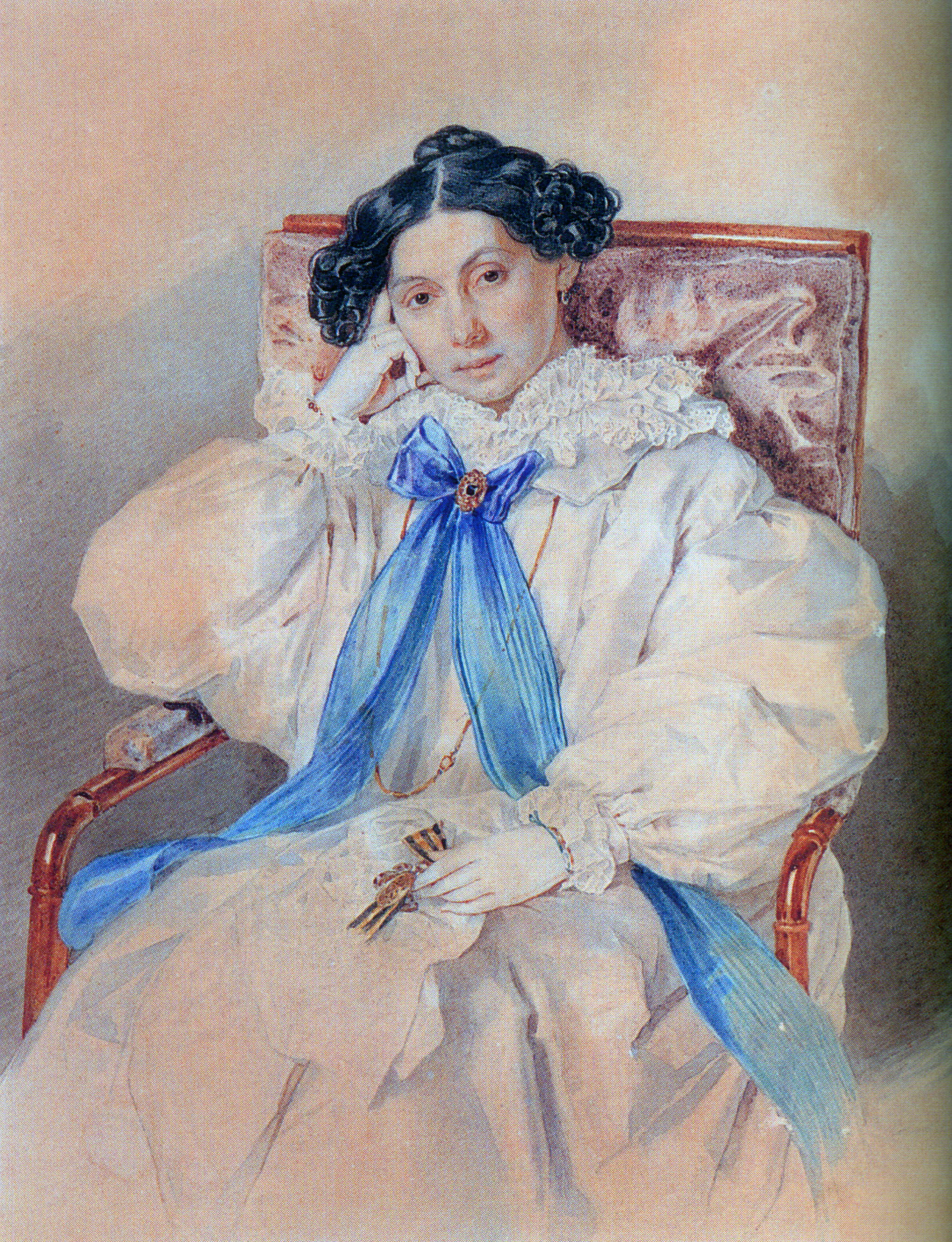
Yelizaveta Khitrovo, 1838
