= Pavel Sokolov (painter) =

Russian painter

- Павел Петрович Соколов
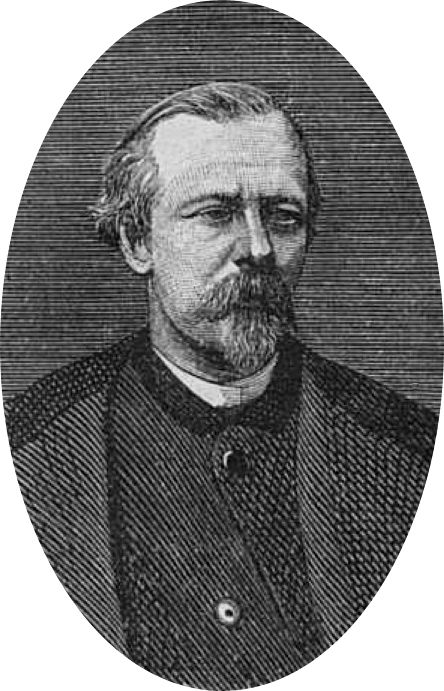
- Pavel Sokolov; from Vsemirnaya Illyustratsia (1878), artist unknown
- Born: 1826; Saint Petersburg
- Died: October 2, 1905 (aged 78–79) place unknown
- Education: Member Academy of Arts (1864)
- Alma mater: Imperial Academy of Arts (1849)
- Known for: Painting

Pavel Petrovich Sokolov (Russian: Павел Петрович Соколов; (1826—1905) was a Russian watercolor painter and illustrator. His brothers, Pyotr and Alexander, were also well-known artists.

== Biography ==
His father was the portrait painter, Pyotr Sokolov. He studied at the Imperial Academy of Arts with Karl Bryullov and was awarded the title of "Free Artist". In 1864, his painting of the Holy Family earned him the title of "Academician".

Most of his works were watercolors. His painting "Troika" was purchased by Tsar Alexander II and several were acquired by the noble Stenbok-Fermor family.

He was also a prolific illustrator; primarily for Всемирная иллюстрация (Illustration World) and similar publications.

Both he and his father were great admirers of Pushkin so, from 1855 to 1860, he created pencil-drawn illustrations for Eugene Onegin and The Captain's Daughter. They met approval from Pushkin's friends and have proven to be very popular.

== Selected works ==
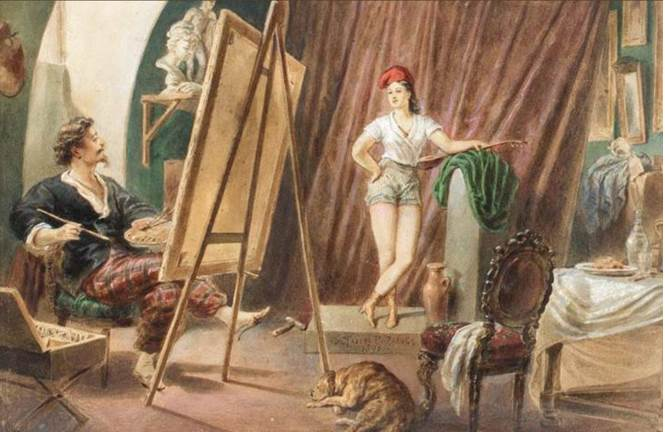
In the Artist's Studio

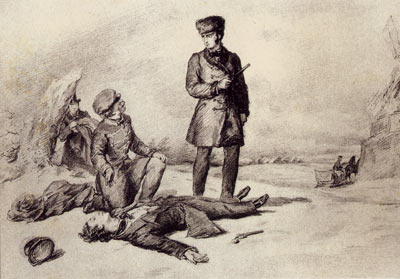
Onegin's Duel with Lensky

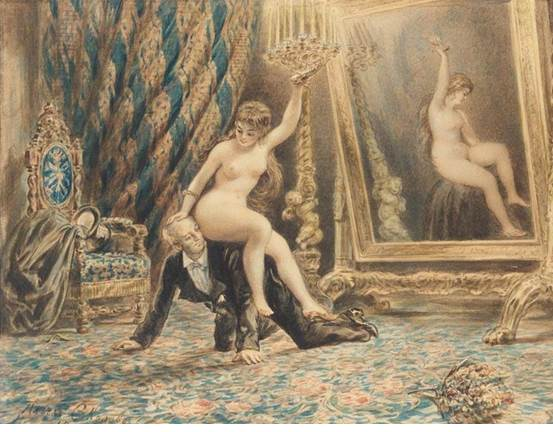
Erotic Scene

== Publications ==
- Sokolov, Pavel P. (1930). Hollerbach, Erich F. [in Russian] (ed.). Воспоминания. Из прошлого русского искусства (in Russian). Leningrad: Academy for History of Material Culture, Committee on Promotion of Art Books.
