= Pyotr Sokolov (painter) =

Russian painter

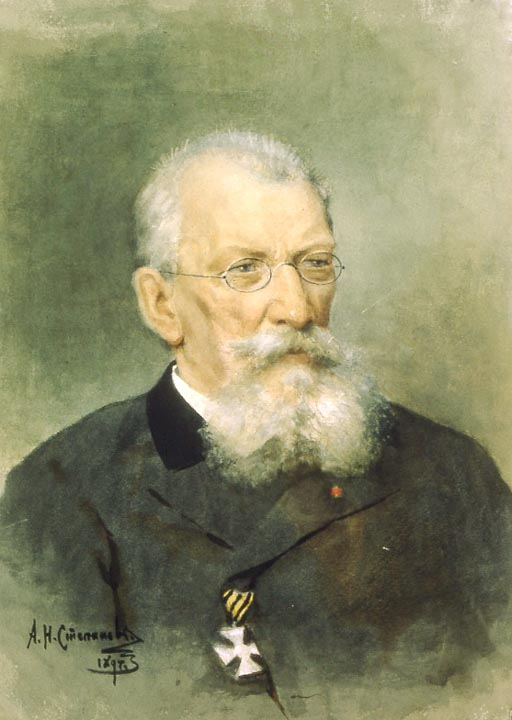
Pyotr Sokolov (1897), by Alexander Nikolaevich Stepanov

Pyotr Petrovich Sokolov (Russian: Пётр Петрович Соколов; 1821, Saint Petersburg - 2 October 1899, Saint Petersburg) was a Russian painter and illustrator.

== Biography ==
He was the eldest son of the watercolor portraitist Pyotr Fyodorovich Sokolov. Although he received lessons from his father, he was largely self-taught until 1840, when he entered the Imperial Academy of Arts. He studied there for three years with his uncle, Karl Bryullov, as well as Pyotr Basin and Fyodor Bruni. He preferred hunting and genre scenes, but also did the occasional portrait.

From 1877 to 1878, he was a frontline correspondent in the Russo-Turkish War and was wounded at the Siege of Plevna. He was awarded the Cross of St. George for bravery. His paintings were shown widely. Among the events he participated in were the Centennial Exhibition in Philadelphia and the Exposition Universelle (1889), after which he was named an honorary member of the Société des Artistes Français. In 1899, at the very end of his life, he was elected an Imperial Academician.

He is, however, best known for his book illustrations; notably a collection of poems by Nikolay Nekrasov and Sketches from a Hunter's Album by Ivan Turgenev as well as Dead Souls by Nikolai Gogol, a popular work for illustrators. His brothers, Pavel and Alexander were also painters.

== Illustrations for Sketches from a Hunter's Album ==
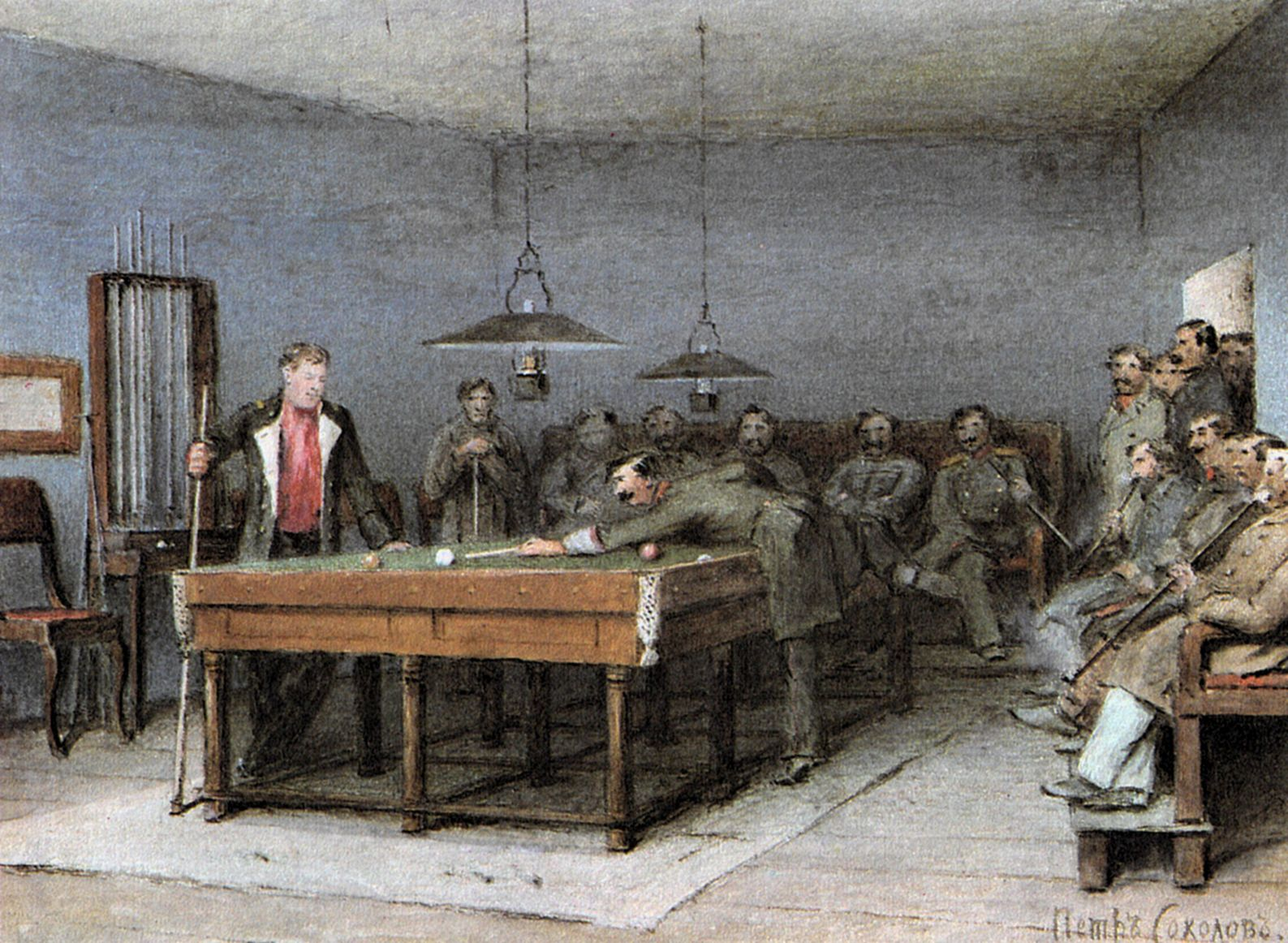
"Lebedyan"

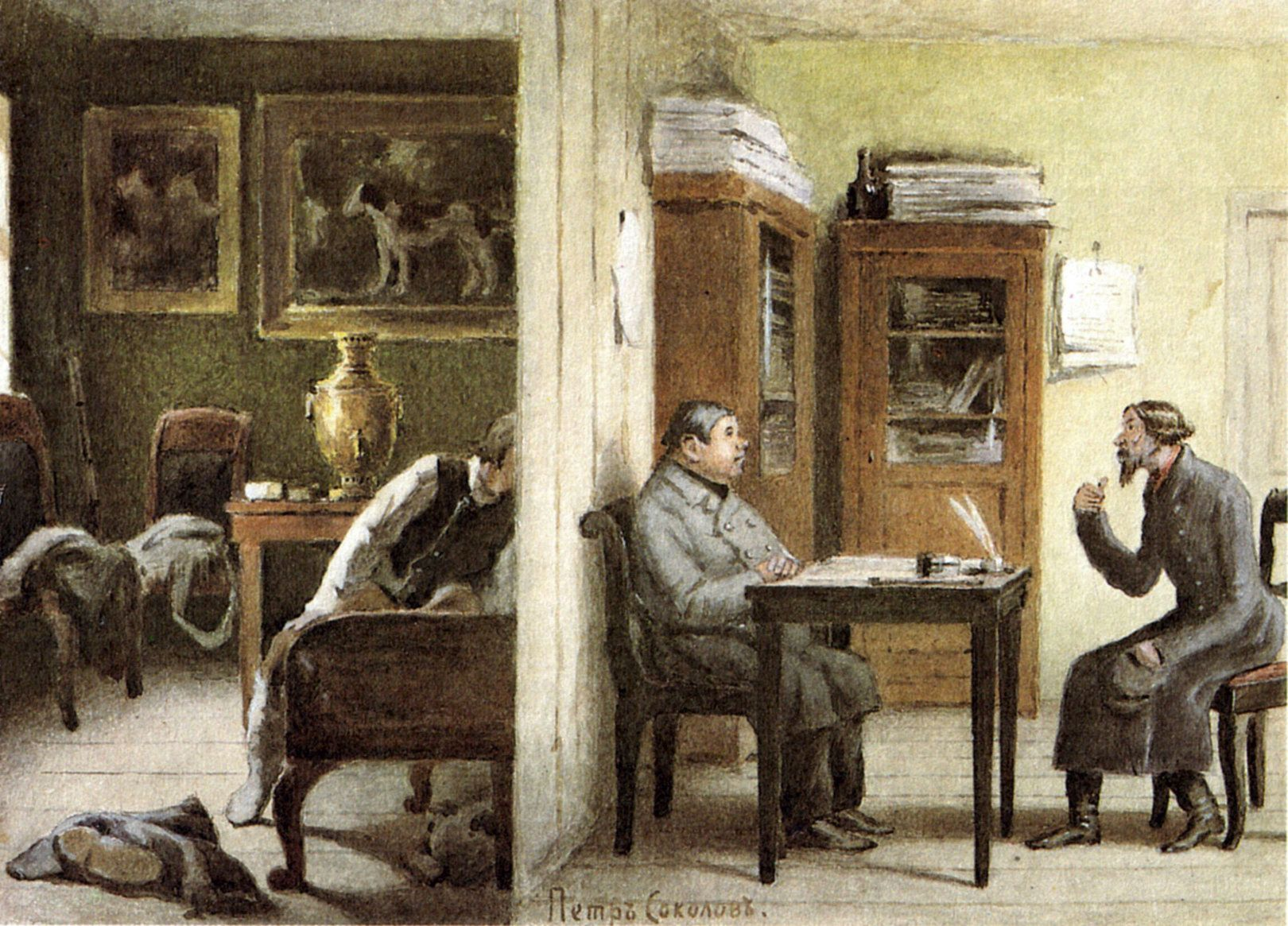
"The Office"

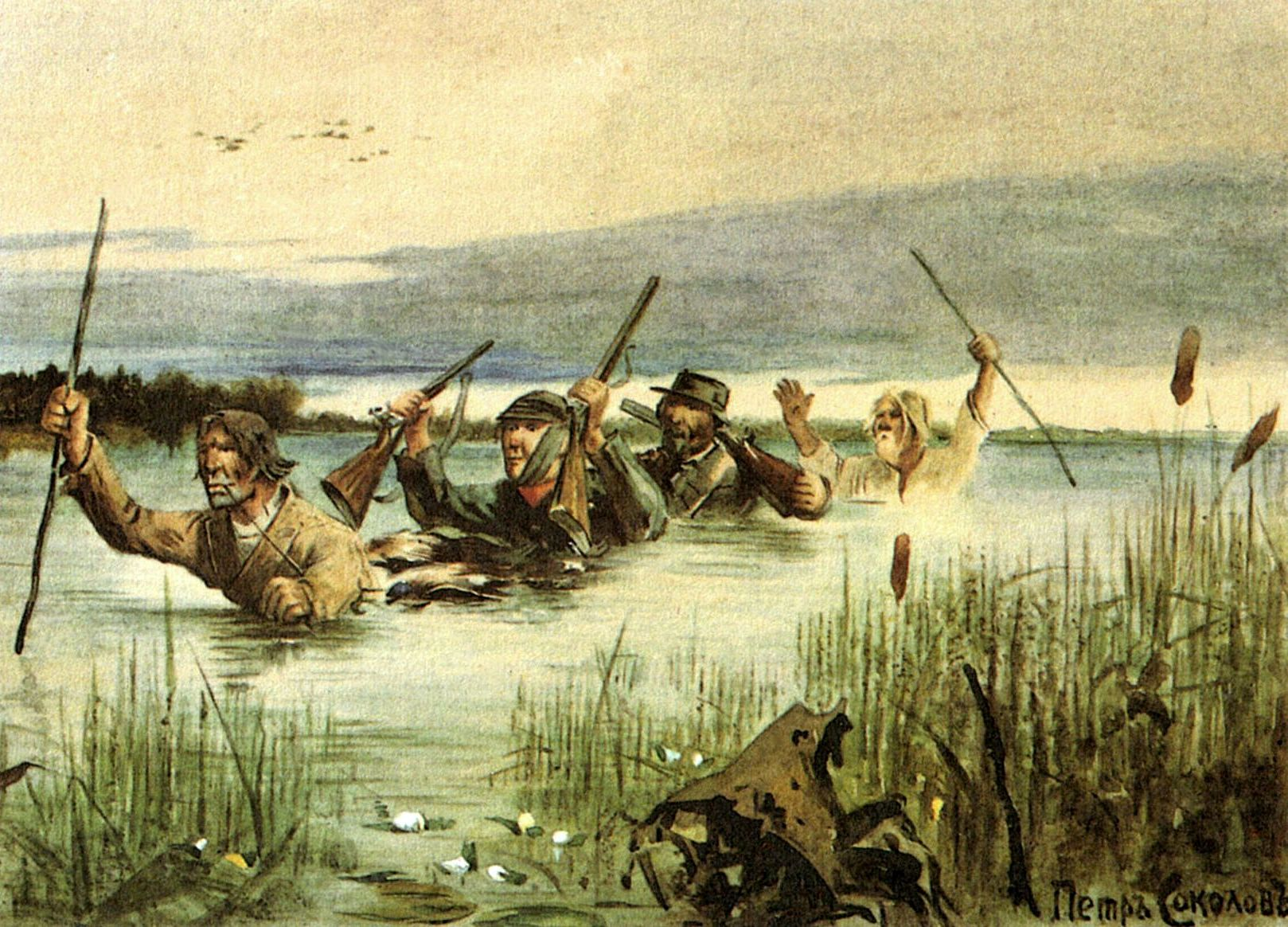
"Lgov"

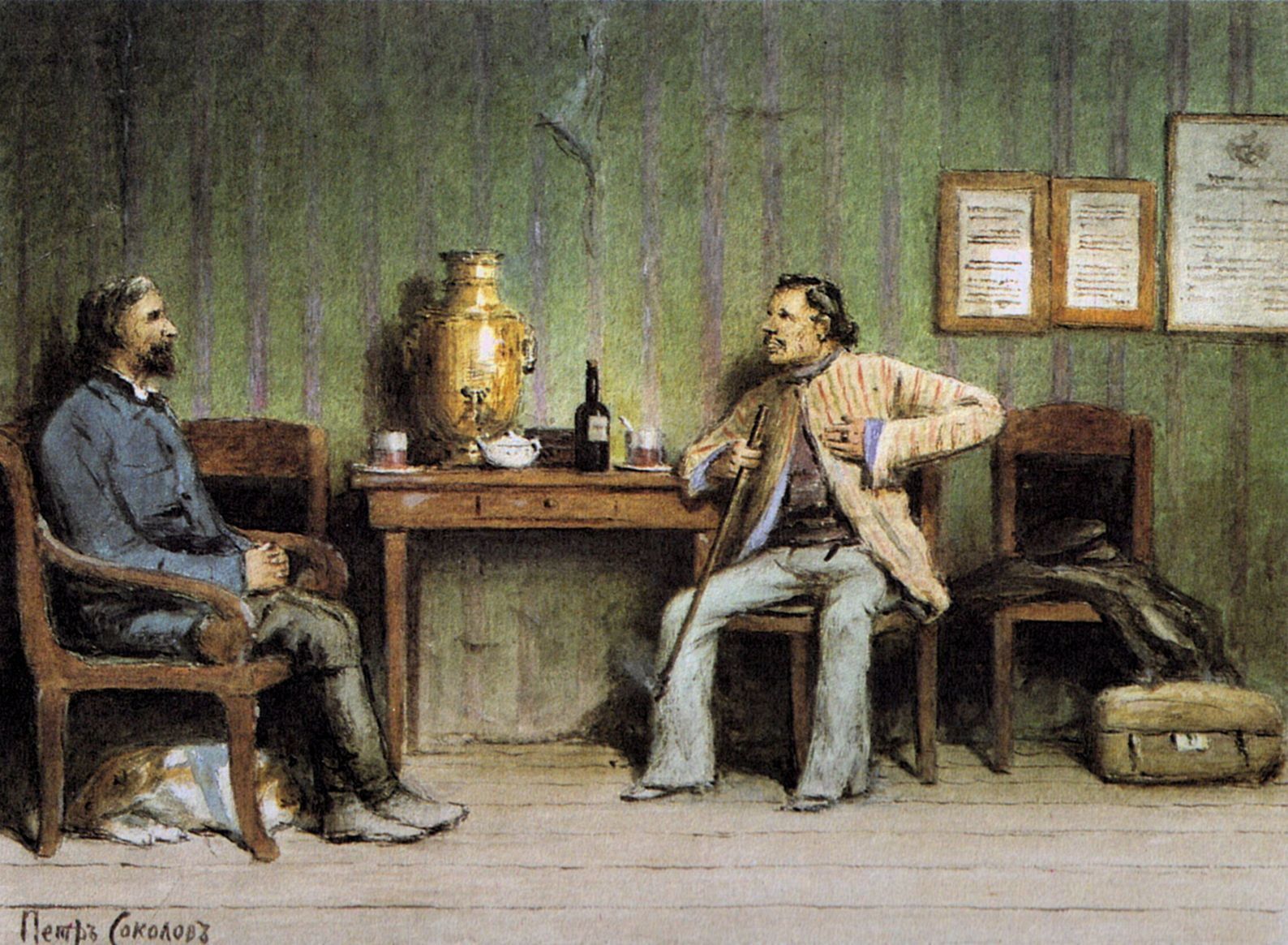
"Pyotr Petrovich Karataev"
