= A Sportsman's Sketches =

Collection of short stories by Ivan Turgenev

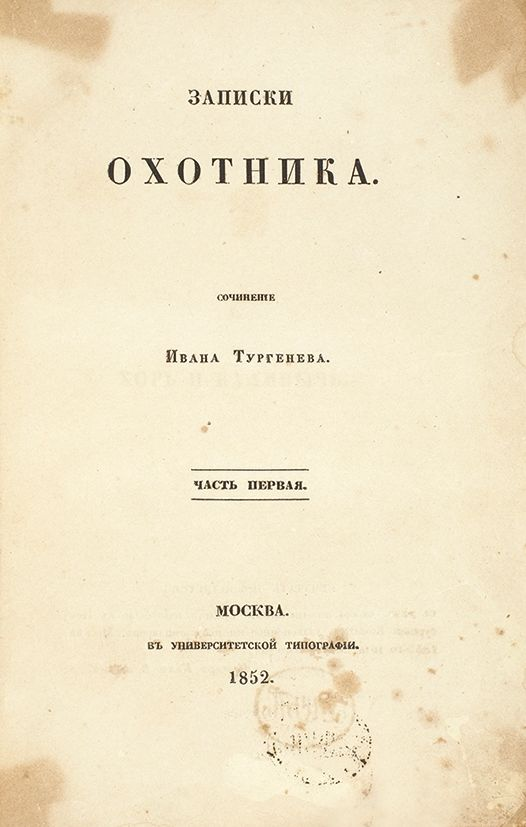
- Title page of the first edition, 1852
- Author: Ivan Turgenev
- Original title: Записки охотника
- Language: Russian
- Published: 1852
- Publication place: Russian Empire
- Text: A Sportsman's Sketches at Wikisource

A Sportsman's Sketches (Russian: Записки охотника, romanized: Zapiski ohotnika; also known as A Sportman's Notebook, The Hunting Sketches and Sketches from a Hunter's Album) is an 1852 cycle of short stories by Ivan Turgenev. It was the first major writing that gained him recognition.

This work is part of the Russian realist tradition in that the narrator is usually an uncommitted observer of the people he meets.

== Writing and publication ==
Turgenev based many of these short stories on his own observations while hunting at his mother's estate at Spasskoye, in Oryol, where he learned of the abuse of the peasants and the injustices of the Russian system that constrained them. The frequent abuse of Turgenev by his mother certainly had an effect on this work.

The stories were first published singly in The Contemporary between 1847 and 1851 before appearing in 1852 in book form. Turgenev was about to give up writing when the first story, "Khor and Kalinich", was well received. The work as a whole actually led to Turgenev's house arrest (part of the reason, the other being his epitaph to Nikolai Gogol) at Spasskoye.

== The stories ==
=== Khor and Kalinych ===
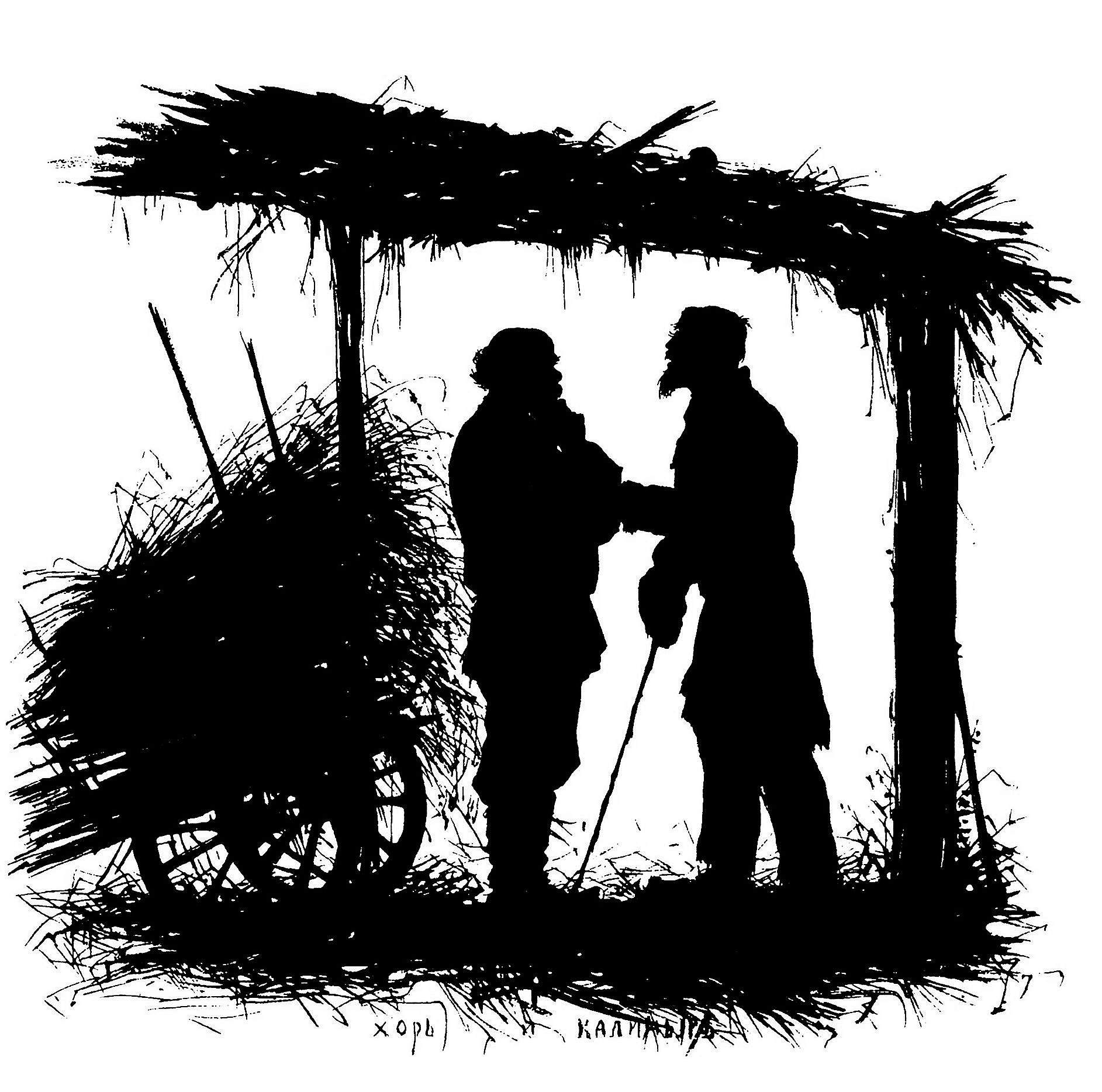
The illustration for Khor and Kalinych by Elisabeth Bohm. 1883.

On an excursion in Kaluga, the narrator makes the acquaintance of a fellow landowner and hunter named Polutykin. Despite Polutykin's solicitude, the narrator seems to prefer the company of two of his peasants: Khor, who is a capable man with a large family, and Kalinych, who is the opposite of Khor, keeps bees, and accompanies Polutykin on hunting trips. The narrator is impressed by these men's differing tempers and their friendship. In a speech in 1860, Turgenev explained the importance of this dichotomy of characters he called "Hamlet-like" and "Quixotic". Though the narrator appears to be an uncommitted observer, he states that he learned a great deal from Khor, and Turgenev makes an implicit argument against serfdom.

=== Yermolay and the Miller’s Wife ===
This story introduces Yermolay. He is a serf belonging to the narrator's neighbor and a skillful hunter who accompanies the narrator on hunting trips. After hunting woodcock into the night, they stay in a hut belonging to a miller whose wife is known to Yermolay. The narrator realizes that he knows of her as well, and recounts the mistreatment she endured from her former master Zverkov when she wished to get married.

=== Raspberry Water ===
At a spring called Raspberry Water (which did exist and still exists in Russia) the narrator meets two peasants, the impoverished Styopushka and the more prosperous Tuman (or Foggy). In realist fashion, the narrator maintains his distance and we are given Tuman's fond recollections of his former master, who lived grand style until he was ruined by his mistresses. At the end the three men are joined by another peasant who tells them that his son has died and his master has angrily refused to decrease his rent.

=== The District Doctor ===
Struck with fever in a small village, the narrator is visited by a district doctor who tells him a story of how he fell in love with a dying patient. The doctor relates how he spent several days in the sick woman's household, cut off by reason of the spring thaw. The late father of the family is said to have been a writer and the family is also isolated from society by reason of their poverty and good education. The doctor cannot help her but he is moved by her beauty and trust in him, and he feels compelled to stay optimistic in front of the family. Before dying, the patient tells her family that they are betrothed. The doctor says that he has since married a merchant's daughter. The narrator tries to comfort the doctor, and they gamble for low stakes into the night.

=== My Neighbor Radilov ===
The narrator (again with Yermolay) is hunting for partridges when he is confronted by the landowner Radilov, of whose existence the narrator has hitherto been ignorant. Radilov invites him to dinner. The narrator appreciates his warmth but is otherwise perplexed by him and his household, which includes his elderly mother, a poor hanger on who plays violin, and girl who appears young enough to be a daughter but turns out to be the sister of Radilov's late wife. Radilov describes his wife's death and how he didn't shed a tear until he saw a fly crawl over her eye. A week after this visit, Radilov runs away with his young sister in law, scandalizing the neighborhood and greatly distressing his mother.

=== Farmer Ovsyanikov ===
The narrator visits with Ovsyanikov, an elderly, conservative, and highly respected member of the lower class of landholders. Prompted to talk about the "good old days", Ovsyanikov says that the narrator's grandfather stole land from his family by force, yet he also praises the man's hunting dog and the lifestyle of the old grandees. Oskyanikov says that the rich are sometimes easier to deal with now, but criticizes the activism of his unemployed nephew Mitya.

=== Lgov ===
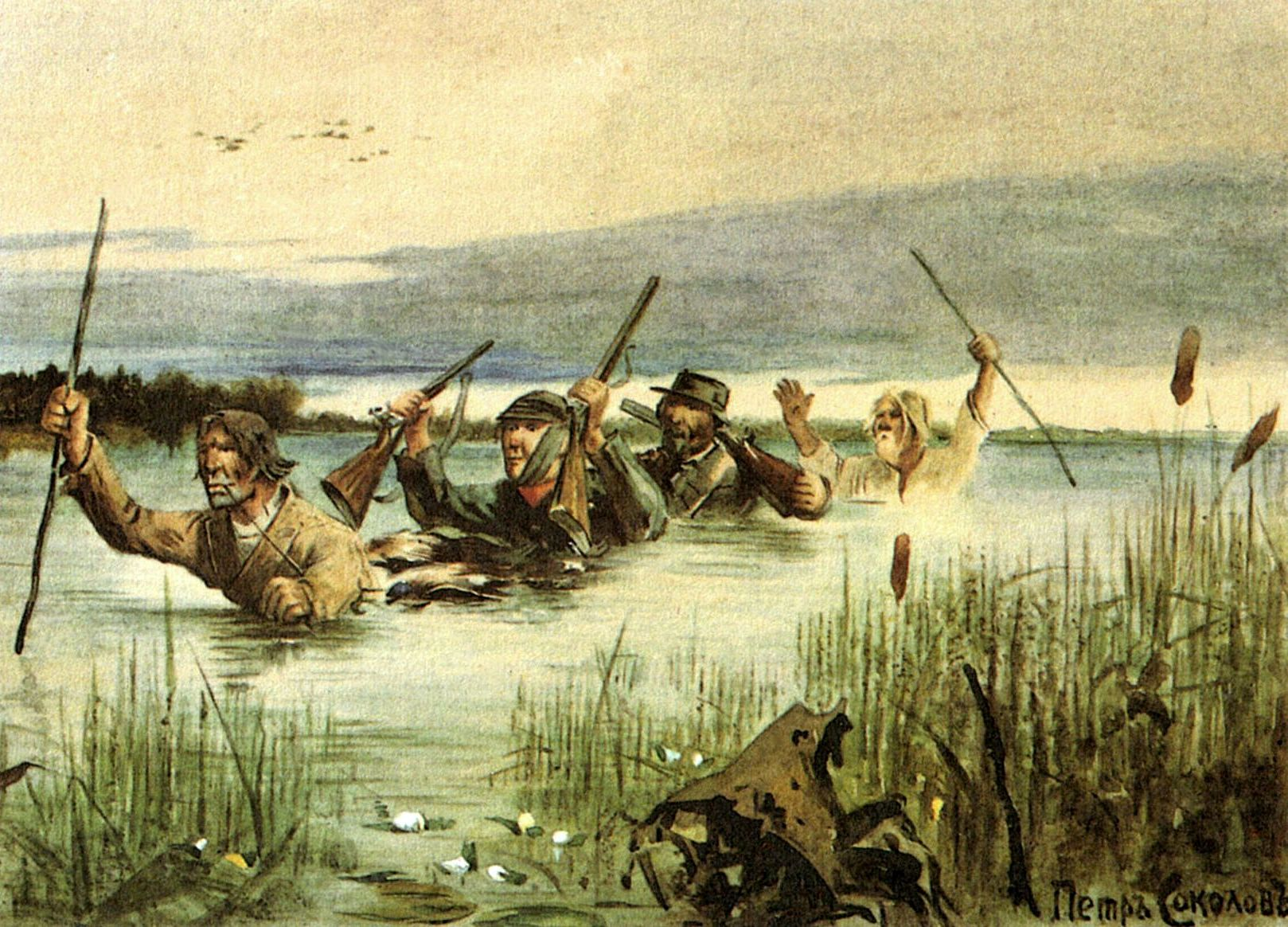
The illustration for Lgov by Pyotr Sokolov. 1890s.

Yermolay and the narrator go hunting duck and realize that they need to borrow a boat. With the help of a pretentious and incompetent hunter named Vladimir, they meet Suchok, or Old Knot. Suchok is employed as a fisherman, though he admits there are no fish in the river, and he lends them a decrepit boat. Eliciting Suchok's life story, the narrator learns that he has been, according to his masters' whims, a coachman, hunter, cobbler, coffee boy, a cook, and even an actor. In the excitement of the hunt, they sink the boat, and Yermolay leads them to shore filthy after great difficulty.

=== Bezhin Lea ===
The story begins with a highly stylized and poetic depiction of the beauty of the countryside during the day. The narrator, in one of his hunting expeditions, gets lost in the woods. As night approaches, he comes across a clearing, where he meets up with five peasant boys near a fire who are grazing the horses. The narrator pretends to be asleep and the boys forget he is there and start exchanging scary tales with each other. This story juxtaposes the natural beauty of the world with the terrifying essence of the “supernatural”.

=== Kasyan from the Beautiful Lands ===
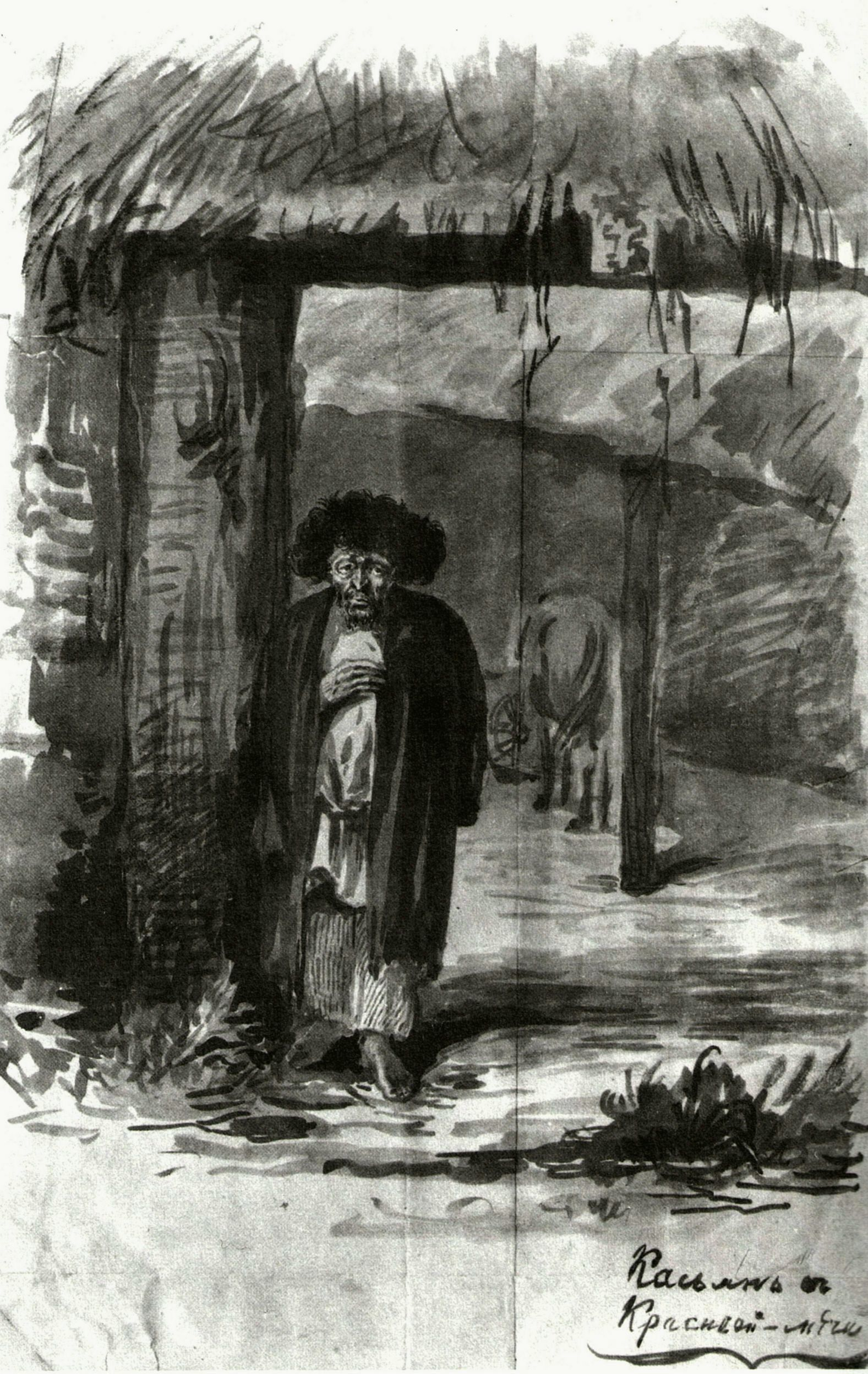
Kasyan from the Beautiful Lands. The drawing by Ivan Turgenev. Between 1860 and 1880.

While in a carriage the narrator comes across a funeral procession and goes to Yudin village to get a new axle when theirs breaks. There he meets Kasyan, a fifty-year-old dwarf who lives in the village and who is a yurodivy. He takes them to get a new axle and the narrator notices how at one he seems with his environment and incredibly generous. Kasyan establishes his hatred of established society through his glorification of the world of folklore and faith.

=== Bailiff ===
Story about the bailiff (Sofron) of a landowner friend of the narrator who is more in control of the land than Arkady Penochkin. He uses the peasants and steals their money from loans. This story is one of the most vivid examples of the peasantry's exploitation.

=== The Office ===
The narrator comes upon a small hut and travels to a village after speaking with an old man there. He comes across a run-down shack that is the main office of the local landowner. He stays there and overhears the head clerk abusing his powers and learns how he uses Losnyakova to abuse the peasants, for example sending away the lover of a young man so they cannot get married. The main idea here is the presentation of the ridiculous bureaucracy created to control the peasants.

=== Loner ===
At night in a droshky, the narrator comes across a man, Foma, in the forest who watches over his landowner's property so peasants don't steal wood. He learns the man's wife left him and their children alone and finds his home incredibly depressing. Foma eventually hears a peasant chopping down a tree and they go out to confront him. The forester takes him to his home and threatens to turn him into the landowner. The narrator tries to buy the peasant's wood so he can be set free, and though they fight at first, Foma eventually agrees and pushes the man out the door. Unlike the previous stories, this work was not featured in “The Contemporary” and was only later added to the sketches in 1852.

=== Two Landowners ===
Story of two different landowners the narrator knows, with descriptions of mistreatment of the peasants including beatings and descriptions of their miserable huts. This again, gives the reader more callous examples of the treatment of the peasantry.

=== Lebedyan ===
Story about a village where the narrator comes across the horse fair. Of particular interest is the lieutenant Khlopakov, who uses catch phrases out of context regardless if they sound strange, which amuses his friend Zhukov. The narrator looks at horses and decides to purchase one, which ends up being lame but he gives up trying to get his money back for it when he realizes the seller's scheme. Turgenev's intentions here were to display the typical events at a local fair.

=== Tatyana Borisovna and her Nephew ===
Story about the modest landowner Tatyana whom everyone loves because she is so generous. In spite of being illiterate she is generous to everyone and does not care for typical dealings that landowners spend their time on and does not care for other women landowners in her area. In the story her nephew Andryusha (an orphan) comes to live with her and loves to draw. He eventually gains the interest of Pyotr Benevolensky, a local collegiate counsellor who is a minor acquaintance of Tatyana, who then takes him to St. Petersburg to be trained in art. When he returns, after asking his aunt for money through the mail several times, she finds he has become Benevolensky and is corrupted. He is fat and annoying and spends his time poorly singing words to songs written by Glinka. Her friends stop visiting her because he is so annoying.

=== Death ===
In this story the narrator opens with a hunting story concerning his neighbor. They find the trees in the area dying with many fallen onto the ground because of a terrible frost (this is an actual event from Russia in 1840). After this he and his friend come upon a peasant who they are told has been smashed by a tree and they watch him die. This reminds the narrator of several stories he remembers about dying and he uses them to explain how the Russian character presents itself when dying. Each character continues as if performing a ritual, not lamenting or even caring. One old woman, with her final breath, reaches for a ruble under her pillow to pay the priest who says her last rites. Here Turgenev appears to be commenting on the isolation of human personality in the face of nature.

=== Singers ===
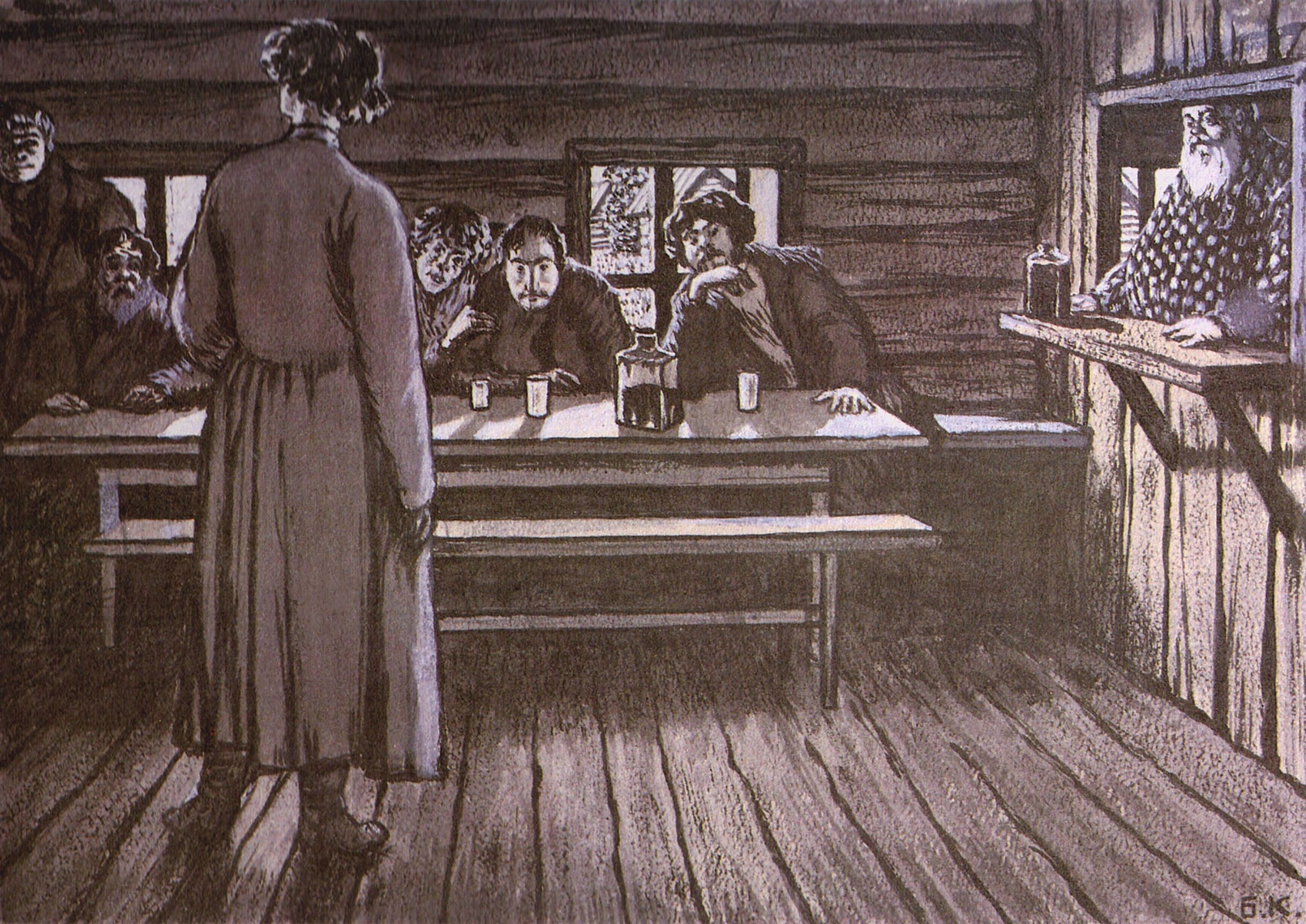
Yakov the Turk Is Singing. The illustration for Singers by Boris Kustodiev. 1908.

The narrator comes to the small and run-down village of Kolotovka, which is bisected by a ravine, and visits a tavern. There, a singing contest is about to begin between the local Yashka the Turk and a booth-keeper from Zhizdry. The booth-keeper goes first, singing a lively dance tune embellished with endless technically impressive flourishes, and is greeted with an outburst of excited praise. Yashka then sings, shy and trembling at first, but gradually gaining fire and breadth, and with a “depth of passion, and youth and sweetness and a sort of fascinating, careless, pathetic melancholy.” His voice sounds with “a spirit of truth and fire, a Russian spirit,” leaving the spectators speechless after he’s finished, until the booth-keeper concedes and rushes out of the room. The narrator leaves the tavern—”afraid of spoiling the impression”—but looks in later to see an animated but cheerless drunken scene. The story ends when he walks away, and hears peasant boys calling to each other in the night.

=== Pyotr Petrovich Karataev ===
While at a post, the narrator meets a lower, uneducated landowner named Karataev who has lost his land because of an IOU. He learns from him that he once fell in love with a peasant girl named Matroyna, owned by another landowner. He attempts to buy her from the woman, but she forbids it because she simply does not want to and sends her away to another village. Karataev, in desperation, finds her and brings her home where he hides her for a time, eluding authorities by placing her away from his home. In the end she gives herself up and Karataev goes off to Moscow, where the narrator finds him later happy amongst friends but completely broke.

=== Meeting ===
While out hunting, the narrator happens to witness the meeting of a peasant girl who is in love with a pampered, pompous valet. When he comes he treats her disdainfully and leaves her to say he is going away after announcing he cannot marry her. The girl sheds tears and the narrator goes to her when she almost collapses, but she runs away when she notices him.

=== Hamlet of the Shchigrovsky District ===
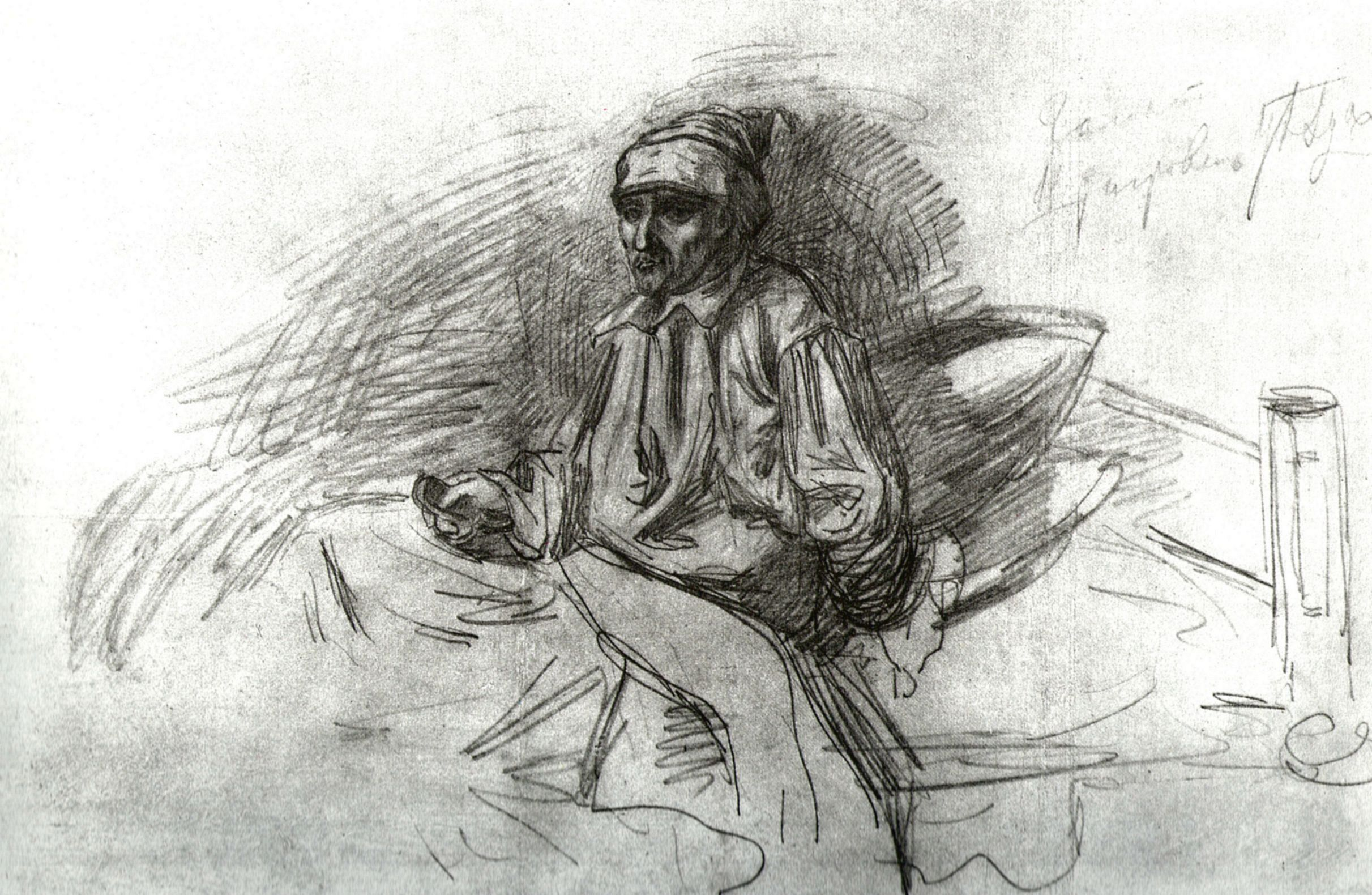
Hamlet of the Shchigrovsky District. The drawing by Ivan Turgenev. Circa 1850 (?).

In this story the narrator spends the evening at a party of a landowner named Alexander G. Here Turgenev gives excellent descriptions and parodies of the nobility. While attempting to go to sleep, the narrator finds his roommate unable to sleep as well and finds out that he is a man who has realized his uniqueness amongst the upper class, even though he is considered a wit. He is forever cursed to deep introspection and finds in himself nothing save a molded being with no true life. He leaves early in the morning without saying goodbye and the narrator never learns his name.

=== Chertopkhanov and Nedopyuskin ===
While hunting with Yermolay, the narrator comes across the landowner Chertopkhanov. He goes away on his horse and another man comes up, his friend Nedopyuskin. Chertopkhanov is the inheritor of a mortgaged little village called Unsleepy Hollow. His friend, Nedopyuskin, became close to him when the former saved him from a crowd of nobles who were tormenting him for being the inheritor of an estate despite the fact that he was so completely devoid of any bit of notoriety for anything. The two bachelors became the best of friends and live together at Unsleepy Hollow in peaceful tranquility in spite of the disrepair of the area. They embody the “loner” figure Turgenev was so interested in, able to live independently in the system.

=== The End of Chertopkhanov ===
Sequel to the previous story, though published much later in 1872. It was originally not part of the sketches. This story is more sequential than the previous, detailing the end of the landowner up to his death. He faces three misfortunes. The first is his love Masha leaving him in true “gypsy” spirit. The second is Nedopyuskin dying of a stroke. The third and final is the loss of his horse Malek Adel, the envy of local landowners who know of Chertopkhanov. One night it is stolen and he does everything in his power to find it, eventually coming across the horse at a fair. He buys it back and brings it home, but something bothers him about it. He begins to realize that the horse is not truly Malek Adel but one that looks like it and in despair he eventually shoots the animal in the head and stays in his bed afterwards. He no longer looks like himself, but when his servant comes up to him the last bit of his being comes forth and he declares that the nobleman Chertopkhanov is dying and no one can stand in his way.

=== Living Relic ===
This story was originally not part of the sketches either and appeared in another collection of stories first in 1874. Here, the narrator comes back to his home estate to find a beautiful servant named Lukeria in a horrible state. After falling from a porch she succumbs to an unknown digestive disorder (not explicitly stated, but implied) that reduces her to an unmoving, skeletal figure. She spends her time in the shed in the summer and near the house in the winter, moved about by the house servants who remain. The narrator is shaken by her disturbing ability to accept her fate, regardless of how terrible it may be. She is completely unable to move and finds her days accented only by the occasional sounds of new birds in the shed, smells, or a rabbit that may occasionally come in to visit her. She eventually dies in peace, completely aware that the day was coming because she saw it in her dreams. This story is slightly different from the others because of the inclusion of the “unreal” found in Lukeria's dream states. The narrator is heartbroken by her condition, but is surprised to find her happy with life in spite of her state. Suggestions have been made that she is so happy because in her inability to move she is also unable to sin.

=== The Clatter of Wheels ===
Also added later to the sketches, but published after the original group in 1874. In this story Yermolay and the narrator find they are almost out of shot, so they decide to go to Tula to get more and fetch a peasant named Filofey. He takes the narrator there, Yermolay stays behind, but on the way hears a carriage clattering far in the distance that he is sure is a group of bandits who will surely murder them when they catch up. The carriage slowly overcomes them in spite of what they try and eventually comes in front of them. Several men are on it singing and laughing, completely drunk. Filofey tries to steer around but every time he does the head carriage moves into their way. When they come to a bridge the carriage stops and the largest of the men approaches. The narrator is sure they are to be killed but is surprised when he finds the drunk man only asking for a bit of money for drinks, stating they have just come from a wedding and want a bit more to celebrate. The narrator and Filofey are relieved and joke with each other about the event, but learn later on that on that very night a merchant was killed on the road and had his carriage stolen. Though uncertain and still joking, they wonder if the carriage that passed them was not in fact from a wedding at all.

=== Forest and Steppe ===
The traditional ending to the sketches, found in every edition. Here, Turgenev gives the readers detailed and beautiful descriptions of the hunter's life, ending the collection.

== Unfinished works ==
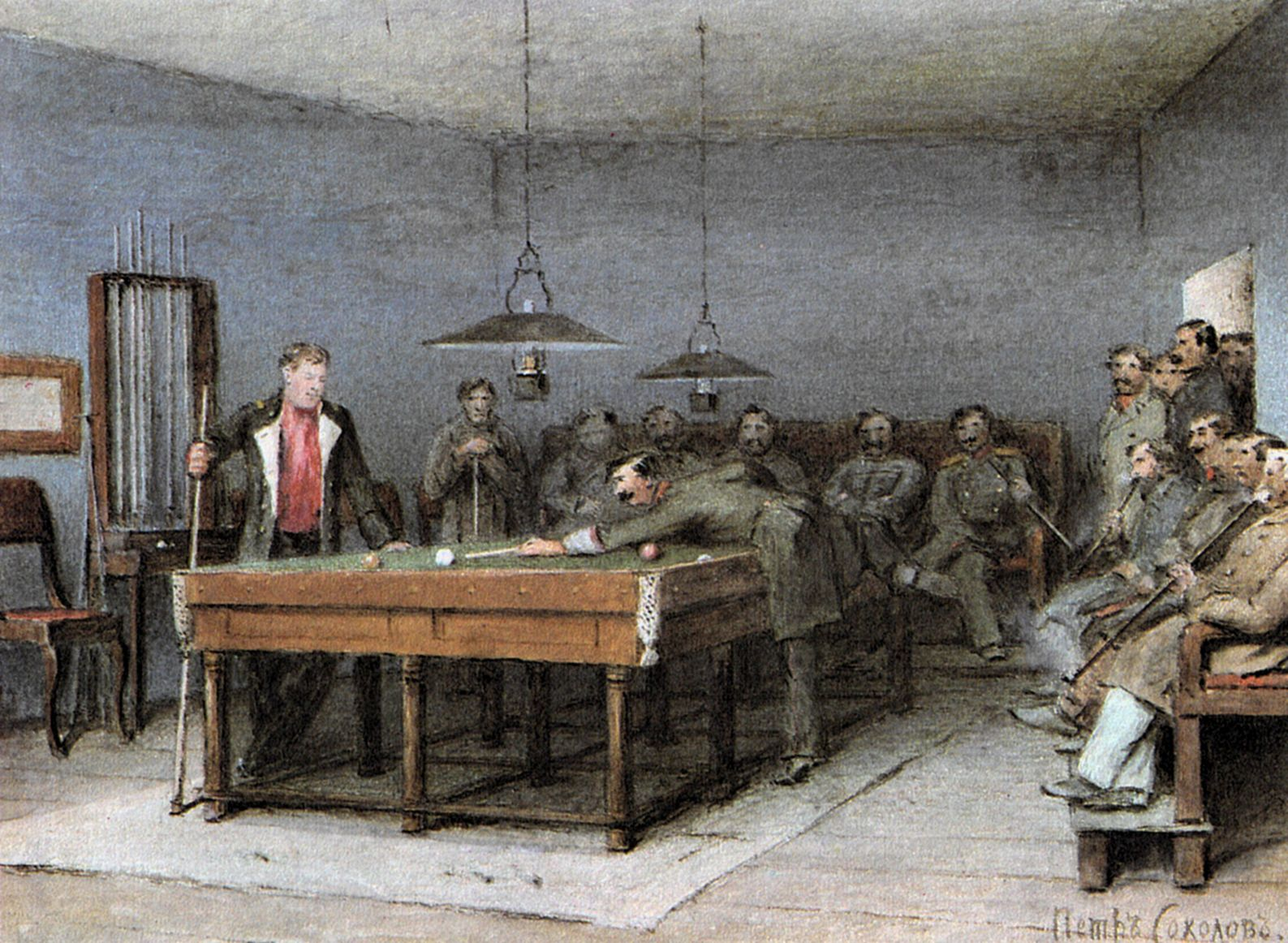
An 1890s illustration to Lebedyan

=== The Russian German ===
An incomplete, short fragment first published in 1964 and never part of the original sketches. Here, the narrator comes across a German landowner in Russia. It is likely he kept this sketch out and never finished it because it did not present a picture of the typical, “Russian” landowner. Here though, he seems to be hinting that the “game” of the sketches is in fact the evils of serfdom and the failures of landowners.

=== The Reformer and the Russian German ===
Another incomplete, though slightly longer, fragment. This may have been a later version of the previous fragment or another fragment itself. It's completely different, with different characters, and again provides the readers with examples of the failures and cruelties of serfdom.

== Critical response and legacy ==
Frank O'Connor wrote

A Sportsman's Sketches may well be the greatest book of short stories ever written. Nobody, at the time that it was written, knew quite how great it was, or what influence it was to have in the creation of a new art form.

O'Connor argued that Turgenev's style was "interesting principally because episodic interest is almost entirely suppressed" and that Turgenev was the first to abandon narrative in this way.

Vladimir Nabokov wrote

Turgenev's plastic musical flowing prose was but one of the reasons that brought him immediate fame, for at least as much interest was contributed by the special subject of these stories. They were all written about serfs and not only present a detailed psychological study, but go even further to idealize these serfs as superior in their human quality to their heartless masters.

Other world writers also admired Turgenev's style. Sherwood Anderson was particularly influenced by Turgenev's literature. He considered A Sportsman's Sketches to be a paradigm for his own short stories.

More recently, Turgenev has been criticized for his somewhat idealized characterization of muzhiks. Turgenev's muzhiks have been compared to other noble savages in 19th-century fiction (such as American Indians in works by J. F. Cooper).
