= Vypolzovo, Ustyuzhensky District, Vologda Oblast =

Vypolzovo Выползово
- Village
- Location within Vologda Oblast Location within Russia
- Coordinates: 58°38′N 36°30′E
- Country: Russia
- Region: Vologda Oblast
- District: Ustyuzhensky District
- Time zone: UTC+3:00

Vypolzovo (Russian: Выползово) is a rural locality (a village) in Nikiforovskoye Rural Settlement, Ustyuzhensky District, Vologda Oblast, Russia. The population was 13 as of 2002.

== Geography ==
Vypolzovo is located 24 km (15 mi) south of Ustyuzhna (the district's administrative centre) by road. Ivanovskoye is the nearest rural locality.
