= Aleksandr Sokolov (painter, born 1829) =

Russian painter

- Александр Петрович Соколов
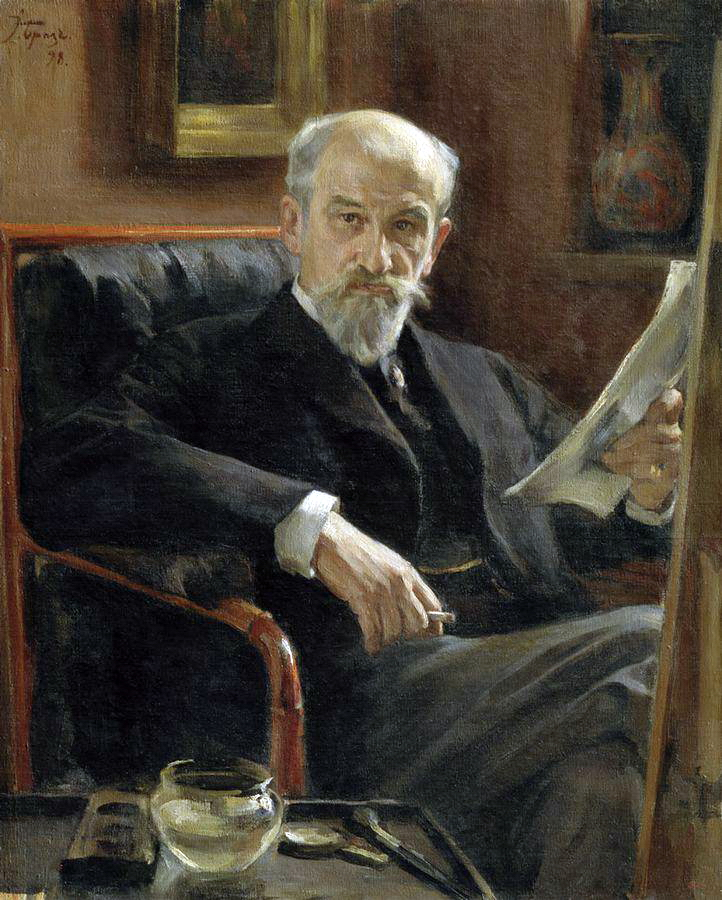
- Portrait by Osip Braz, 1898, oils; Russian Museum, St. Petersburg
- Born: October 29, 1829; Saint Petersburg
- Died: November 19, 1913 (aged 84)
- Education: Moscow School of Painting; Imperial Academy of Arts (1854)
- Known for: Watercolor portrait painting
- Style: Academism
- Spouse: Anastasia Zagryazhskaya (m. 1863)
- Children: two
- Elected: Member Academy of Arts (1859); Full Member Academy of Arts (1896)

Alexander Petrovich Sokolov (Russian: Александр Петрович Соколов; 10 November 1829 — 2 December 1913) was a Russian painter, active in St. Petersburg during Tsars Alexander II through Nicholas II's reigns, particularly known for his watercolor portraits. His brothers, Pyotr and Pavel were also well-known artists.

== Biography ==
His father was the portrait painter, Pyotr Sokolov. Alexander Brullov and Karl Brullov were his uncles. He left the gymnasium in 1847, before completing his studies, to enter the Moscow School of Painting, Sculpture and Architecture. After two years there, he entered the Imperial Academy of Arts.

Upon receiving the title of "Artist", he decided to follow in his father's footsteps and devote himself mostly to watercolor portraiture. In 1859, a painting of his brother, Pyotr, was among those that won him the title of "Academician".

In 1881, he became a member of the Peredvizhniki and exhibited with them frequently. He became especially well known for portraits of women, doing several of Empress Maria Feodorovna and other members of the Imperial Family. In 1883, his portraits of Tsar Alexander III and the Tsarina in their Imperial robes were published as lithographs in the official Coronation Album.

from 1892 to 1907, he served as curator of the Russian Academy of Arts Museum; housed at the Imperial Academy. He became a full member of the Academy in 1896.

== Writings ==
- Sokolov, Aleksandr P. (1882). "Пётр Фёдорович Соколов, основатель портретной акварельной живописи в России. 1787–1848". Русская старина (in Russian). Vol. 33, no. 3. St. Petersburg: Balashev Typography. pp. 637–646.

== Selected works ==
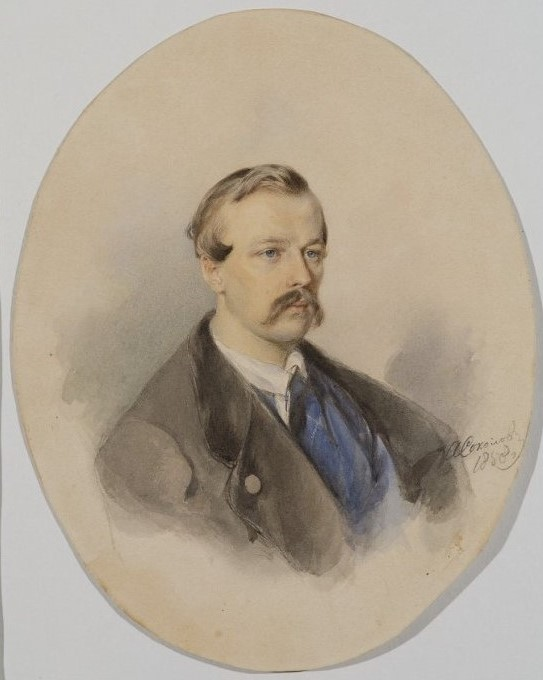
Pavel Sokolov, the painter's brother, signed and dated 1858; Pushkin Museum, Moscow, from Ilya Silberstein's collection

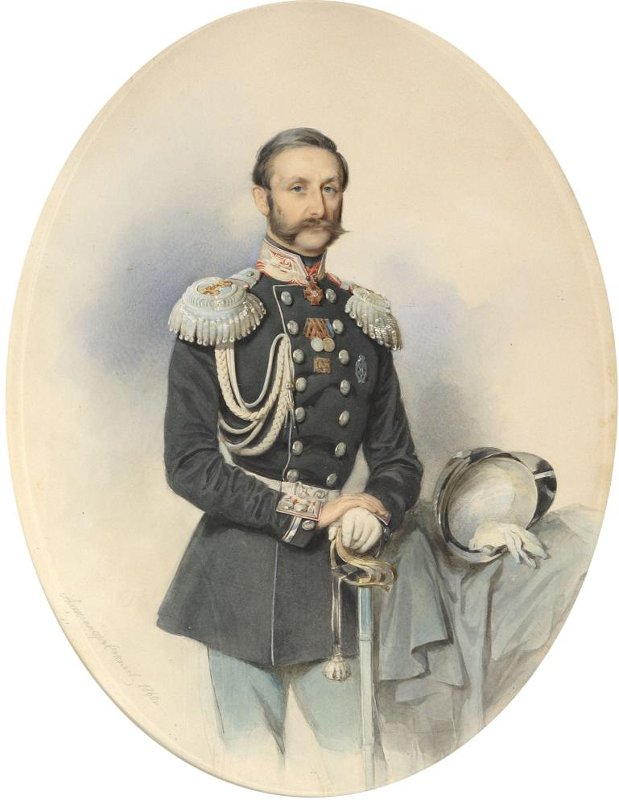
Prince Aleksey Ivanovich Kropotkin, signed and dated 1860; Tropinin Museum, Moscow

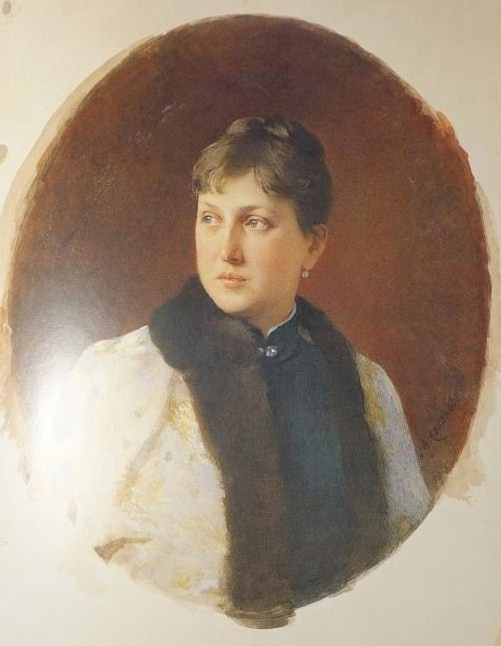
Princess Anna Imeretinskaya, scholarly dated 1870s; Russian Museum, St. Petersburg

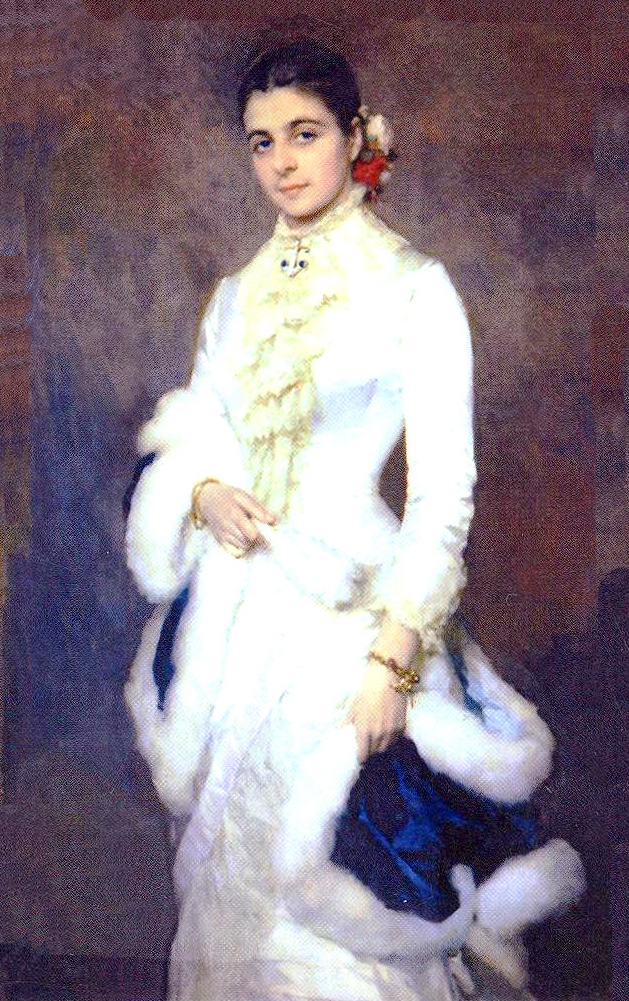
Countess Yevgeniya Alekseyevna Stroganova (née Princess Vasilchikova), 1883; Pskov Museum Preserve

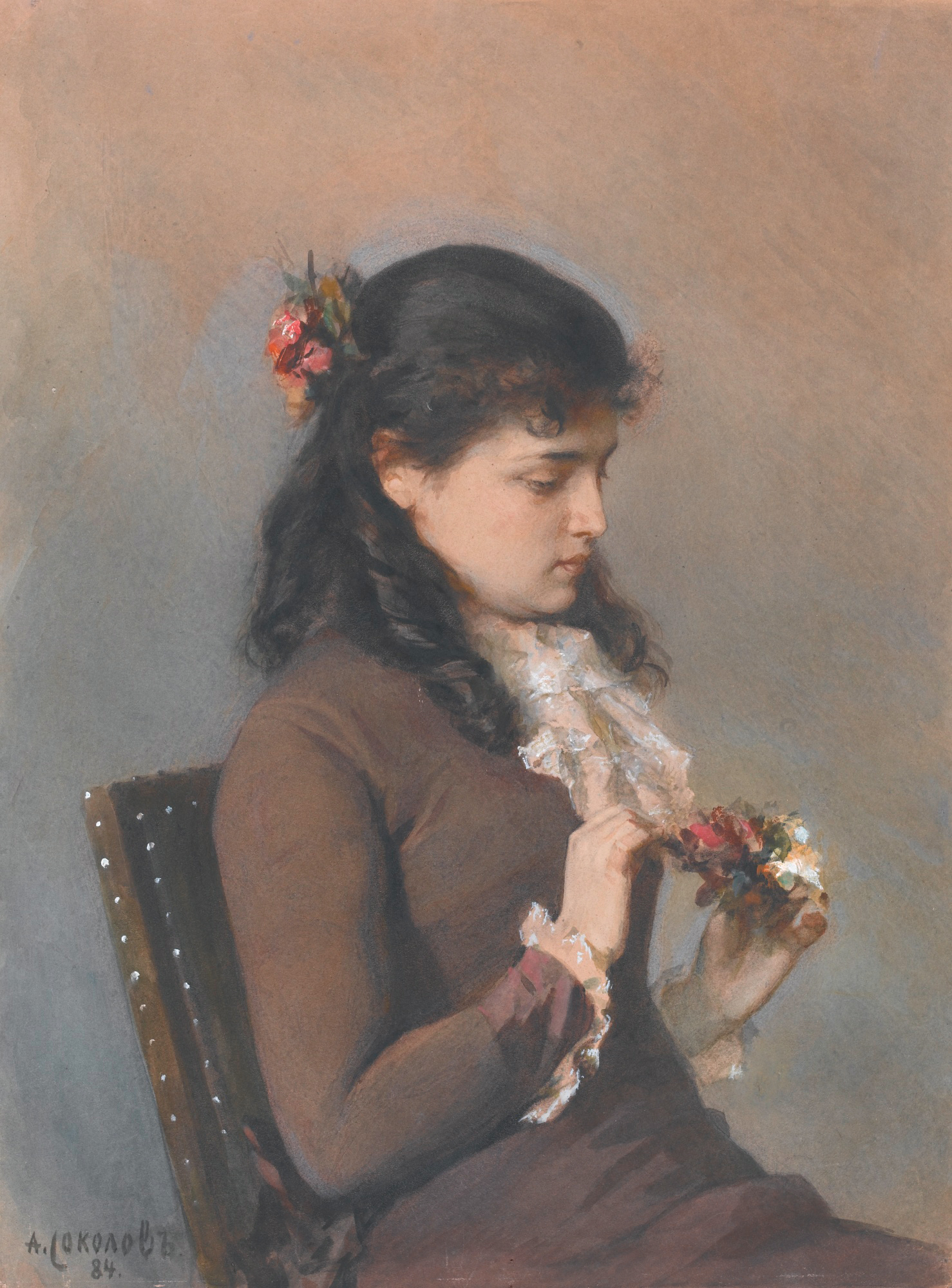
The Girl with Flowers, portrayal of Anna Sokolova, the painter's daughter, signed and dated 1884; owned by ballistics scholar Boris Okunev during the Soviet era, auctioned at Sotheby's in November 2014

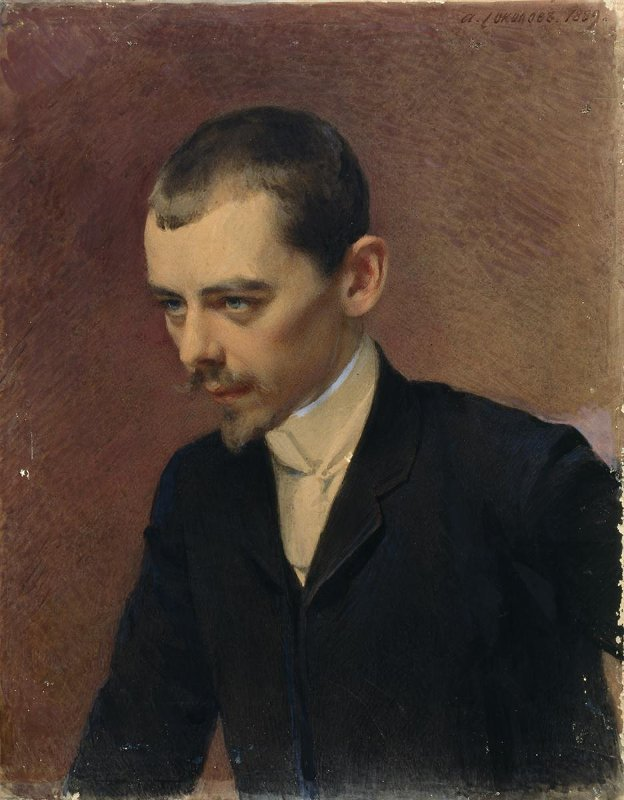
Ivan Yendogurov, signed and dated 1889; Kroshitsky Museum, Sevastopol

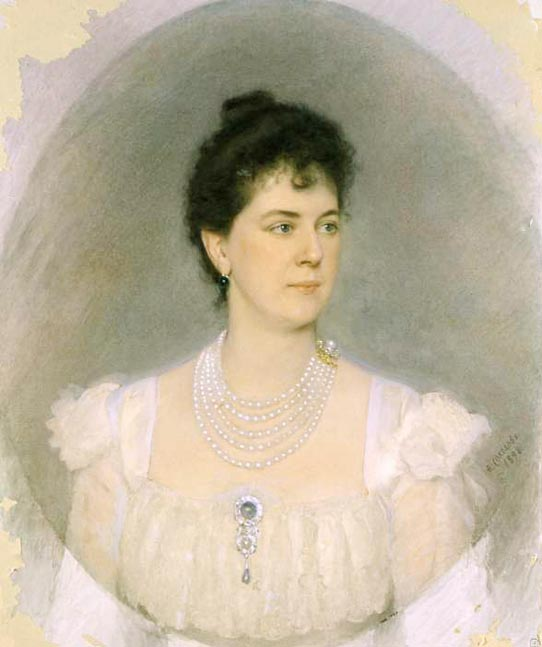
Princess Maria Tenisheva, signed and dated 1898; Russian Museum

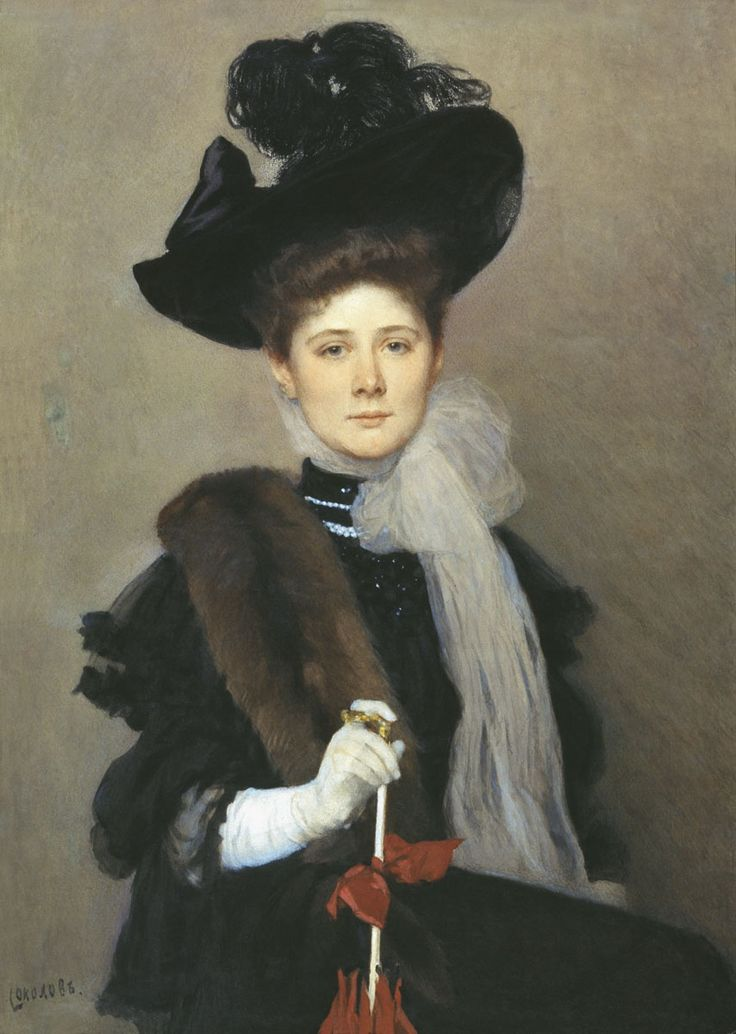
Lyubov Hausch, signed and undated; Simferopol Art Museum

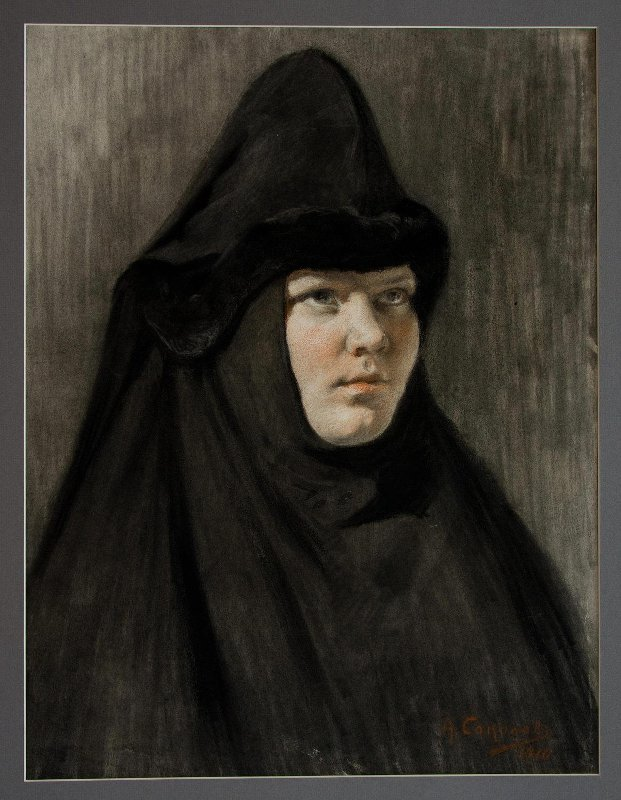
Portrait of a Nun, signed and dated 1910; Samara Art Museum
