= Vypolzovo, Velikoustyugsky District, Vologda Oblast =

Vypolzovo Выползово
- Village
- Location within Vologda Oblast Location within Russia
- Coordinates: 60°41′N 45°46′E
- Country: Russia
- Region: Vologda Oblast
- District: Velikoustyugsky District
- Time zone: UTC+3:00

Vypolzovo (Russian: Выползово) is a rural locality (a village) in Nizhneyerogodskoye Rural Settlement, Velikoustyugsky District, Vologda Oblast, Russia. The population was 15 as of 2002.

== Geography ==
Vypolzovo is located 41 km southwest of Veliky Ustyug (the district's administrative centre) by road. Lodeyka is the nearest rural locality.
