= Vypolzovo, Ilyinsky District, Ivanovo Oblast =

Vypolzovo Выползово
- Village
- Location within Ivanovo Oblast Location within Russia
- Coordinates: 56°58′N 39°51′E
- Country: Russia
- Region: Ivanovo Oblast
- District: Ilyinsky District
- Time zone: UTC+3:00

Vypolzovo (Russian: Выползово) is a rural locality (a village) in Ilyinsky District, Ivanovo Oblast, Russia. Population: 6 (2010 census);

== Geography ==
This rural locality is located 5 kilometres (3.1 mi) from Ilyinskoye-Khovanskoye (the district's administrative centre), 67 kilometres (42 mi) from Ivanovo (capital of Ivanovo Oblast) and 192 kilometres (119 mi) from Moscow. Olenino is the nearest rural locality.
