= Novo-Barsukovo =

Novo-Barsukovo Ново-Барсуково
- Village
- Location within Vladimir Oblast Location within Russia
- Coordinates: 55°35′N 41°47′E
- Country: Russia
- Region: Vladimir Oblast
- District: Melenkovsky District
- Time zone: UTC+3:00

Novo-Barsukovo (Russian: Ново-Барсуково) is a rural locality (a village) in Denyatinskoye Rural Settlement, Melenkovsky District, Vladimir Oblast, Russia. The population was 4 as of 2010.

== Geography ==
Novo-Barsukovo is located on the Kartyn River, 33 km northeast of Melenki (the district's administrative centre) by road. Vypolzovo is the nearest rural locality.
