= Bryullov =

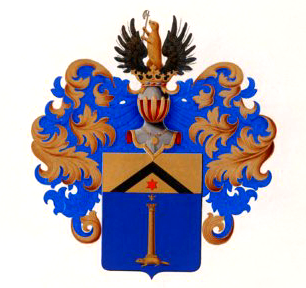
Coat of arms, Brullov

Bryullov, Bryulov, Briullov or Briuloff (Russian: Брюллов), a Russian masculine surname, derives from the French surname Brulleau; its feminine counterpart is Bryullova. It may refer to (for example):

- Alexander Brullov (1798–1877), Russian artist
- Karl Bryullov (1799–1852), Russian painter, brother of Alexander
- Pavel Brullov (1840–1914), Russian painter, son of Alexander
