= Vypolzovo, Yuryev-Polsky District, Vladimir Oblast =

Vypolzovo Выползово
- Village
- Location within Vladimir Oblast Location within Russia
- Coordinates: 56°34′N 39°21′E
- Country: Russia
- Region: Vladimir Oblast
- District: Yuryev-Polsky District
- Time zone: UTC+3:00

Vypolzovo (Russian: Выползово) is a rural locality (a village) in Krasnoselskoye Rural Settlement, Yuryev-Polsky District, Vladimir Oblast, Russia. The population was 1 as of 2010.

== Geography ==
Vypolzovo is located on the Kist River, 24 km northwest of Yuryev-Polsky (the district's administrative centre) by road. Gorki is the nearest rural locality.
