= List of 20th-century Russian painters =

This is a list of 20th-century Russian painters of the Russian Federation, Soviet Union, and Russian Empire, both ethnic Russians and people of other ethnicities. This list also includes painters who were born in Russia but later emigrated, and those born elsewhere but immigrated to the country and/or worked there for a long time. Artists are arranged in chronological order within the alphabetical tables. The basis for inclusion in this List can serve as the recognition of the artistic community, confirmed by authoritative sources, as well as the presence of article about the artist in Wikipedia.

For the full list of Russian artists in Wikipedia, see Category:Russian artists.

== A ==
- Taisia Afonina (1913–1994)
- Piotr Alberti (1913–1994)
- Stepan Alexandrovsky (1842–1906)
- Nathan Altman (1879–1970)
- Evgenia Antipova (1917–2009)
- Fedor Antonov (1904–1990)
- Abram Arkhipov (1862–1930)
- Karine Aslamazyan (born 1956)
- Mariam Aslamazyan (1907–2006)
- Eranuhi Aslamazyan (1910–1998)
- Irina Azizyan (1935–2009)

== B ==
- Boris Fedorovich Borzin (1922–1990)
- Albert Bakun (born 1946)
- Léon Bakst (1866–1924)
- Irina Baldina (1922–2009)
- Vladimir Baranov-Rossine (1888–1944)
- Nikolai Baskakov (1918–1993)
- Evgenia Baykova (1907–1997)
- Vsevolod Bazhenov (1909–1986)
- Konstantin Bogaevsky (1872–1943)
- Nikolay Bogdanov-Belsky (1868–1945)
- Piotr Belousov (1912–1989)
- Yuri Belov (1929–2017)
- Veniamin Borisov (1935–2014)
- Victor Borisov-Musatov (1870–1905)
- Isaak Brodsky (1884–1939)
- Misha Brusilovsky (1931–2016)
- Varvara Bubnova (1886–1983)
- Piotr Buchkin (1886–1965)
- Erik Bulatov (born 1933)
- David Burliuk (1882–1967)

== C ==
M. Chagall. Bella with white collar, 1917

- Marc Chagall (1887–1985)
- Vladimir Chekalov (1922–1992)
- Evgeniy Chuikov (1924–2000)
- Evgeny Chuprun (1927–2005)

== D ==
- Mai Dantsig (1930–2017)
- Olga Della-Vos-Kardovskaya (1875–1952)
- Mikhail Demyanov (1873–1913)
- Alexander Deyneka (1899–1969)
- Irina Dobrekova (born 1931)
- Nikolay Dosekin (1863–1935)
- Aleksandr Drevin (1889–1938)
- Olya Dubatova

== E ==
- Aleksandra Ekster (1882–1949)
- Alexei Eriomin (1919–1998)

== F ==
- Robert Falk (1886–1958)
- Nicolai Fechin (1881–1955)
- Pavel Filonov (1883–1941)
- Rudolf Frentz (1888–1956)
- Sergei Frolov (1924–1998)

== G ==
- Nikolai Galakhov (born 1928)
- Aleksandr Gerasimov (1881–1963)
- Sergey Gerasimov (1885–1964)
- Irina Getmanskaya (born 1939)
- Ilya Glazunov (1930–2017)
- Ivan Godlevsky (1908–1998)
- Aleksandr Golovin (1863–1930)
- Vasily Golubev (1925–1985)
- Natalia Goncharova (1881–1962)
- Vladimir Gorb (1903–1988)
- Tatiana Gorb (1935–2013)
- Konstantin Gorbatov (1876–1945)
- Gavriil Gorelov (1880–1966)
- Elena Gorokhova (1933–2014)
- Igor Grabar (1871–1960)
- Alexander Grigoriev (1891–1961)
- Boris Grigoriev (1886–1939)
- Aleksei Gritsai (1914–1998)
- Abram Grushko (1918–1980)
- Mikhail Guzhavin (1888–1931)

== H ==
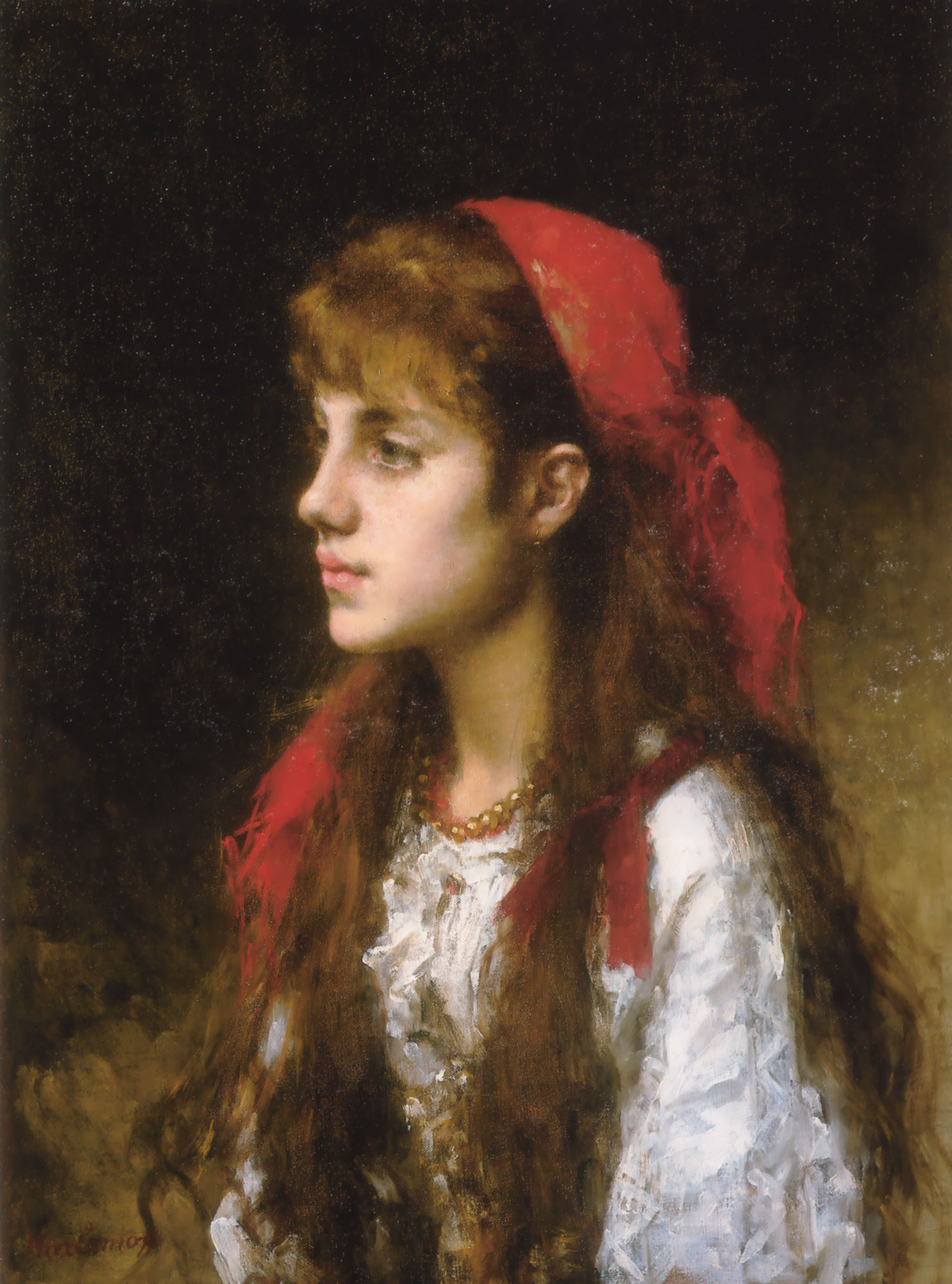
A. Harlamov. A Russian Beauty

- Alexei Harlamov (1840–1925)

== I ==
- Boris Ioganson (1893–1973)
- Serge Ivanoff (1893–1983)
- Sergey Ivanov (1864–1910)

== J ==
- Alexandre Jacovleff (1887–1938)
- Alexej von Jawlensky (1864–1941)

== K ==
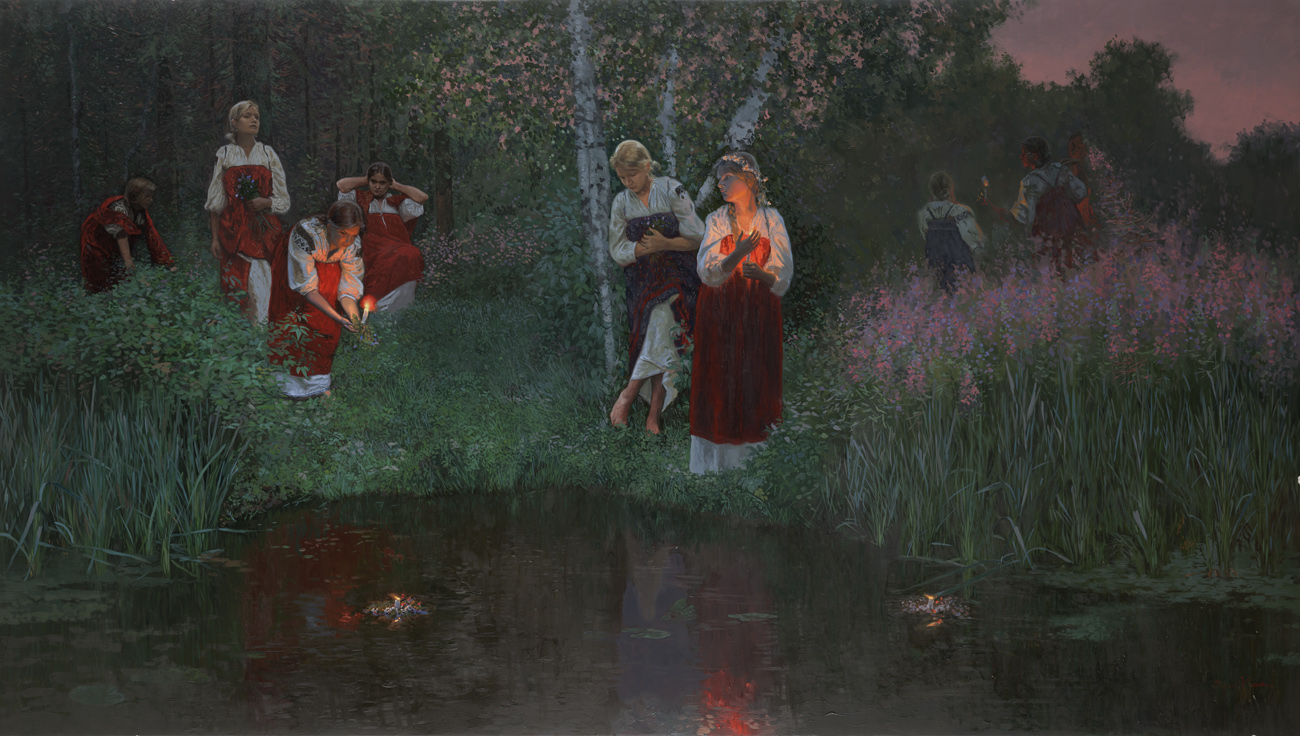
Simon Kozhin Ivan Kupala. Fortunetelling on the wreaths. 2009

- Wassily Kandinsky (1866–1944)
- Mikhail Kaneev (1923–1983)
- Dmitry Kardovsky (1866–1943)
- Nikolay Kasatkin (1859–1930)
- Ivan Kazakov (1873–1935)
- Mikhail Khmelko (1919–1975)
- Muhadin Kishev (born 1939)
- Yuri Khukhrov (1932–2003)
- Elena Nikandrovna Klokacheva (1871–c.1943)
- Boris Kocheishvili (born 1940)
- Andrei Kolkoutine (born 1957)
- Sergei Arksentevich Kolyada (1907–1996)
- Pyotr Konchalovsky (1876–1956)
- Maya Kopitseva (1924–2005)
- Tatiana Kopnina (1921–2009)
- Aleksey Korin (1865–1923)
- Pavel Korin (1892–1967)
- Boris Korneev (1922–1974)
- Gely Korzhev (1925–2012)
- Elena Kostenko (1926–2019)
- Nikolai Kostrov (1901–1995)
- Gevork Kotiantz (1906–1996)
- Mikhail Kozell (1911–1993)
- Engels Kozlov (1926–2007)
- Simon Kozhin (born 1979)
- Vladimir Krantz (1913–2003)
- Yaroslav Krestovsky (1925–2003)
- Nikolay Krymov (1884–1958)
- Arkhip Kuindzhi (1842–1910)
- Ivan Kulikov (1875–1941)
- Alexander Kuprin (1880–1960)
- Boris Kustodiev (1878–1927)
- Alex Kuznetsov (born 1978)
- Nikolai Kuznetsov (1850–1930)
- Nikolai Kuznetsov (1879–1970)
- Pavel Kuznetsov (1878–1968)

== L ==
- Alexander Laktionov (1910–1972)
- Valeria Larina (1926–2008)
- Mikhail Larionov (1881–1964)
- Boris Lavrenko (1920–2000)
- Ivan Lavsky (1917–1977)
- Vladimir Lebedev (1891–1967)
- Felix Lembersky (1913–1970)
- Leningrad Secondary Art School
- Aristarkh Lentulov (1882–1943)
- Emmanuil Lipkind (1928–2007)
- Piotr Litvinsky (1927–2009)
- Oleg Lomakin (1924–2010)
- Alexander Lubimov (1879–1955)
- Boris Lukoshkov (1922–1989)
- Vladimir Lisunov (1940–2000)

== M ==
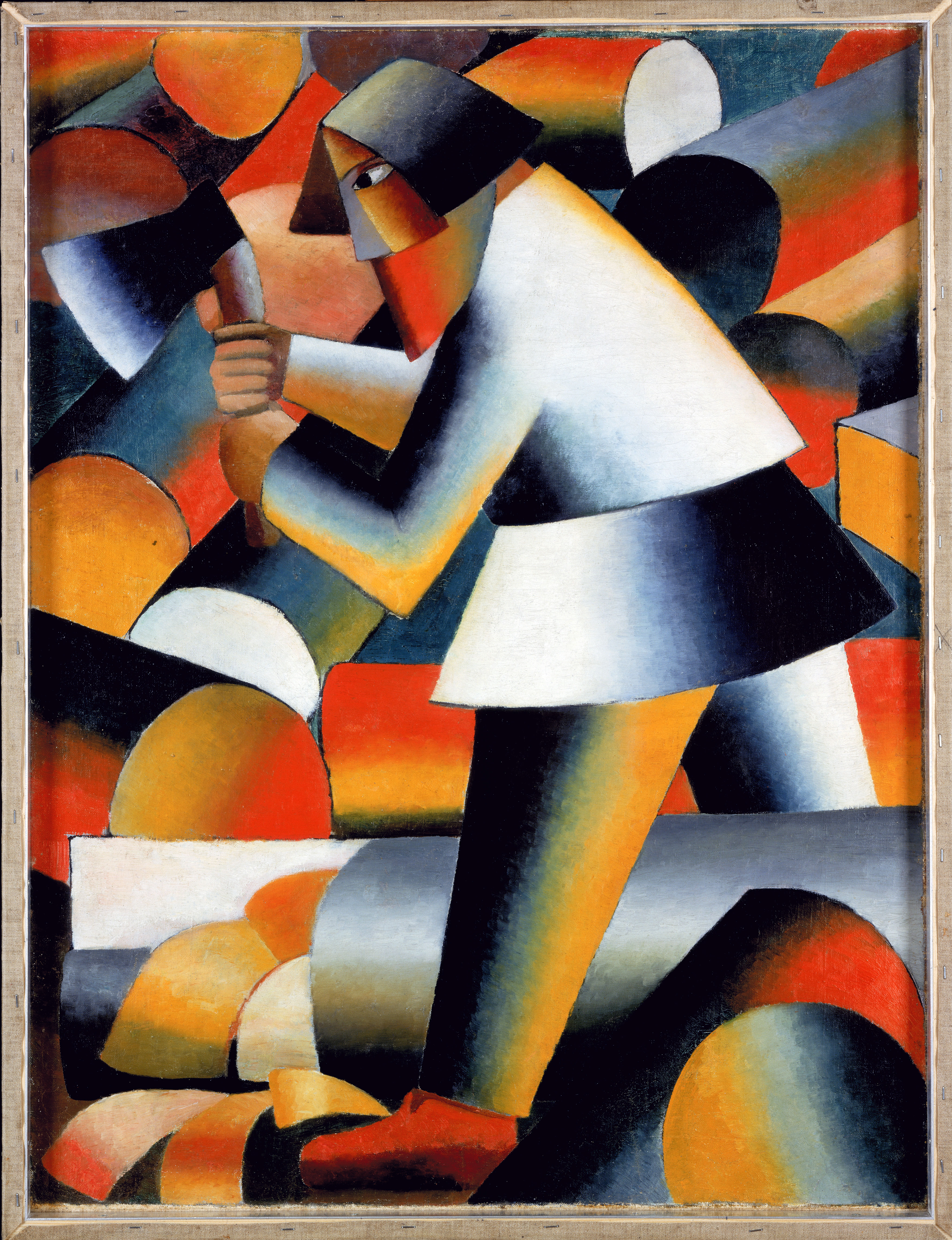
K. Malevich. Woodcutter, 1913

- Michael Matusevitch (1929–2007)
- Dmitry Maevsky (1917–1992)
- Aleksandr Makovsky (1869–1924)
- Konstantin Makovsky (1839–1915)
- Vladimir Makovsky (1846–1920)
- Kasimir Malevich (1879–1935)
- Gavriil Malish (1907–1998)
- Filipp Malyavin (1869–1940)
- Sergey Malyutin (1859–1937)
- Stepan Mamchich (1924–1974)
- Ilya Mashkov (1881–1944)
- Evsey Moiseenko (1916–1988)
- Valentina Monakhova (born 1932)
- Alexei Mozhaev (1918–1994)
- Nikolai Mukho (1913–1986)

== N ==
- Dmitriy Nalbandyan (1906–1993)
- Anatoliy Nasedkin (1924–1994)
- Mikhail Natarevich (1907–1979)
- Alexander Naumov (1935–2010)
- Tatyana Nazarenko (born 1944)
- Igor Novikov (born 1961)
- Piotr Nazarov (1921–1988)
- Vera Nazina (born 1931)
- Anatoli Nenartovich (1915–1988)
- Alexey Novikov (born 1931)
- Yuri Neprintsev (1909–1996)
- Mikhail Nesterov (1862–1942)
- Samuil Nevelshtein (1903–1983)

== O ==
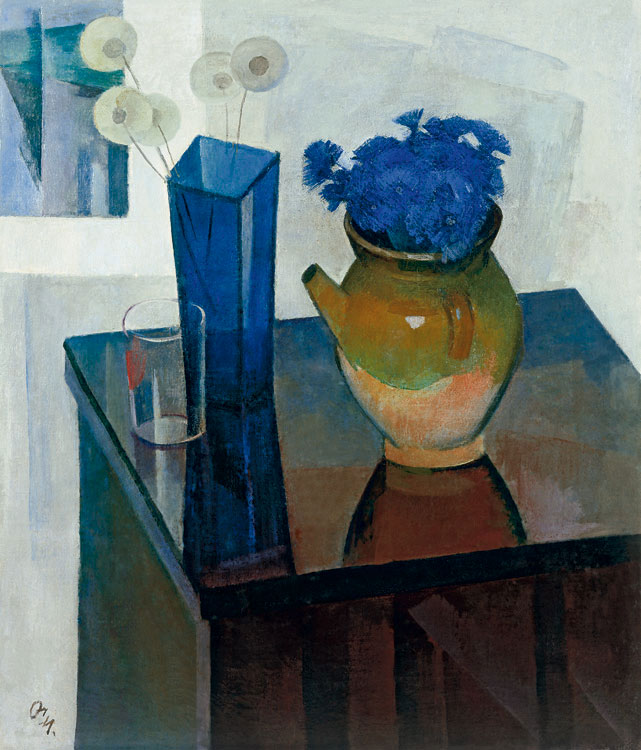
S. Osipov Cornflowers, 1976

- Dmitry Oboznenko (1930–2002)
- Lev Orekhov (1913–1992)
- Nikolai Orlov (1863–1924)
- Sergei Osipov (1915–1985)
- Alexander Osmerkin (1892–1953)
- Victor Otiev (1935–2000)
- Nikolai Ovchinnikov (1918–2004)
- Vladimir Ovchinnikov (1911–1978)

== P ==
- Leonid Pasternak (1862–1945)
- Kuzma Petrov-Vodkin (1878–1939)
- Arkady Plastov (1893–1972)
- Ivan Pohitonov (1850–1923)
- Vasily Polenov (1844–1927)
- Serge Poliakoff (1906–1969)
- Lukian Popov (1873–1914)
- Lyubov Popova (1889–1924)
- George Pusenkoff (born 1953)
- Nikolai Pozdneev (1930–1978)
- Evgeny Pozdnekov (1923–1991)
- Alexander Pushnin (1921–1991)

== R ==
- Lubov Rabinovich (1907–2002)
- Afanasy Razmaritsyn (1844–1917)
- Ilya Repin (1844–1930)
- Fyodor Reshetnikov (1906–1988)
- Teresa Feoderovna Ries (1874–1950)
- Nicholas Roerich (1874–1947)
- Franz Roubaud (1856–1928)
- Olga Rozanova (1886–1918)
- Maria Rudnitskaya (1916–1983)
- Galina Rumiantseva (1927–2004)
- Kapitolina Rumiantseva (1925–2002)
- Lev Russov (1926–1988)
- Andrei Ryabushkin (1861–1904)
- Arcady Rylov (1870–1939)

== S ==
- Vladimir Sakson (1927–1988)
- Tahir Salahov (1928–2021)
- Salavat Salavatov (1922–2005)
- Alexander Samokhvalov (1894–1971)
- Martiros Saryan (1880–1972)
- Ivan Savenko (1924–1987)
- Gleb Savinov (1915–2000)
- Vladimir Seleznev (1928–1991)
- Alexander Semionov (1922–1984)
- Arseny Semionov (1911–1992)
- Iuliia Semkovskaia (born 1990)
- Zinaida Serebriakova (1884–1967)
- Yuri Shablikin (born 1932)
- Boris Shamanov (1931–2009)
- Alexander Shilov (born 1943)
- Alexander Shmidt (1911–1987)
- Oleksii Shovkunenko (1884–1974)
- Nadezhda Shteinmiller (1915–1991)
- Nikolai Shulpinov (1885–1921)
- Elena Skuin (1908–1986)
- Galina Smirnova (1929–2015)
- Nikolai Nikolaevich Smoliakov (1937–1999)
- Alexander Sokolov (1918–1973)
- Alexander Stolbov (born 1929)
- Fedot Sychkov (1870–1958)

== T ==
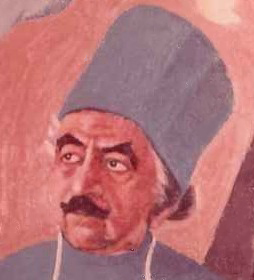
I. Tsvaygenbaum Section of portrait Dr. Ilizarov, 1988

- Alexander Tatarenko (1925–2000)
- German Tatarinov (1925–2006)
- Victor Teterin (1920–1991)
- Nikolai Timkov (1912–1993)
- Leonid Tkachenko (born 1927)
- Mikhail Tkachev (1912–2008)
- Mikhail Trufanov (1921–1988)
- Olga Tsutskova (born 1952)
- Israel Tsvaygenbaum (born 1961)
- Yuri Tulin (1921–1986)
- Vitaly Tulenev (1937–1998)

== U ==
- Nadezhda Udaltsova (1886–1961)

== V ==
- Ivan Varichev (1924–2016)
- Anatoli Vasiliev (1917–1994)
- Piotr Vasiliev (1909–1989)
- Viktor Vasnetsov (1848–1926)
- Valery Vatenin (1933–1977)
- Nina Veselova (1922–1960)
- Igor Veselkin (1915–1997)
- Sergei Vinogradov (1869–1938)
- Boris Vipper (1888–1967)
- Yefim Volkov (1844–1920)
- Rostislav Vovkushevsky (1917–2000)

== W ==
- Vladimir Weisberg (1924–1985)

== Y ==
- Lazar Yazgur (1928–2000)
- Vasily Yefanov (1900–1978)
- Konstantin Yuon (1875–1958)

== Z ==
- Vecheslav Zagonek (1919–1994)
- Ruben Zakharian (1901–1993)
- Sergei Aleksandrovich Zalshupin (1898/1900–1931)
- Sergei Zakharov (1900–1993)
- Maria Zubreeva (1900–1991)

== See also ==
- List of 19th-century Russian painters
- List of Russian artists
- Saint Petersburg Union of Artists
- Russian culture
- 1957 in Fine Arts of the Soviet Union
