= List of Russian artworks in the National Museum of Serbia =

The Russian art collection in National Museum of Serbia has 90 paintings, and numerous prints, etchings and was mostly donated by Prince Paul of Yugoslavia. The Collection also has over 100 icons from the 15th to 19th century. The collection includes work by painters and sculptors such as Ivan Aivazovsky, Marc Chagall, Wassily Kandinsky, Nicholas Roerich, Ilya Repin, Filipp Malyavin, Alexei Harlamov, Mikhail Larionov, Boris Grigoriev, Vladimir Borovikovsky, Pavel Kuznetsov, Konstantin Korovin, Kazimir Malevich, Alexandre Benois, El Lissitzky, Mstislav Dobuzhinsky, Alexander Nikolayevich Samokhvalov, Pyotr Nilus etc.

- Orest Kiprensky, Portrait of Emperor's Son (canvas)
- Ivan Aivazovsky, On the Black Sea Coast (canvas 90x130cm) and Sunset
- Nicholas Roerich (5 canvases and 2 temperas), Berendej Village (canvas 1919), Holy Guests (canvas 82×153), Church Bells Tolling, Burgustan on Caucassus, St. Sergey Monastery, Costume Snjegurochka Draft I, Costume Snjegurochka Draft II
- Wassily Kandinsky, Binz on Rugen, Violet (lithograph) and Orange (lithograph)
- Ilya Repin, (4 canvases and 1 aquarel) Nikolai Kuznetcov Portrait, Mikhail Glinka Portrait, Peasant Woman, Woman dressed traditionally, Hotkovo (aquarel), Self Portrait (pen)..
- Konstantin Makovsky, Portrait of Prince Nikolai Michailovich (canvas 107×73 cm), Portrait of Man, In Front of Painting, Portrait of Lady
- Vladimir Borovikovsky, Portrait of Karageorge (1816)
- Marie Bashkirtseff, Prince Bozidar Karadjordjevic Portrait
- Vladimir Lebedev (painter), Emperor Pray (watercolor)
- Unknown Russian 18th century, Portrait of Peter the Great
- Ivan Pohitonov, Small Swamp, Landscape with Bathers
- Marc Chagall, (1 canvas, 9 graphics) Old man and cow (guache), Moses Throwing the Tablets (etching), Fantastic Composition (pencil), Jew with Trunk (ink), Yakov and Isac (etching), Moses in the Desert (etching), Mann with Book (etching), Girl with Flowers (lithography) and Self Portrait (etching)
- Alexei Harlamov, Portrait of Girl, Girl with the Blue Vail, Portrait of Redhead Girl
- Filipp Malyavin, Portrait of Father, Portrait of Maria Karadjordjevic
- Mstislav Dobuzhinsky, Sketch for Evgenie Onegin (aquarel), English Bay in St.Petersburg (canvas)
- Boris Grigoriev, Landscape in Bretagna
- Konstantin Korovin, Parisisan Boulevard Cafe, Parisisan Boulevard by Night, Monte Carlo
- Nikolay Bogdanov-Belsky, Visiting teacher
- Zinaida Serebriakova, Street in Versay (canvas 1926)
- Vladimir Sosnovsky, Waves, Sailship in the Sea
- Mikhail Larionov, Still Life
- Alexander Beggrov, Treport in Normandy
- Nikolay Kuznetzov, Ludmila Tolstoy Portrait, Portrait of Young Man in black coat, Landscape
- Alexandre Benois, Nastasia Filipovna Boudoir (aquarel), Empress Maria Alexandrovna Salon in Gachina (aquarel),
- Pyotr Nilus, Wet Street, Parisian Street,
- Feodor Tchoumakoff Petrovitch, 8 portraits of Young Woman
- Konstantin Terechkovitch, Portrait of Woman in Hat
- Alexei Korovin, Still Life with Fish and Bottle
- Alexander Ivanovitsch Jakovlev, Italian Landscape
- Nikolay Millioti, Self Portrait
- Vasiliy Suhaev, Landscape
- Alexander Archipenko, Two women (canvas), Nude (chalk), Female Act (color lithography)
- El Lissitzky, The proun 2B, The Proun 5B, No Name Construction (aquarel), Winning over Sun (aquarel)
- André Lanskoy, No Name, No Name, Composition in Red
