= Simon Kozhin =

Russian painter (born 1979)

Simon Leonidovitch Kozhin Семён Леонидович Кожин
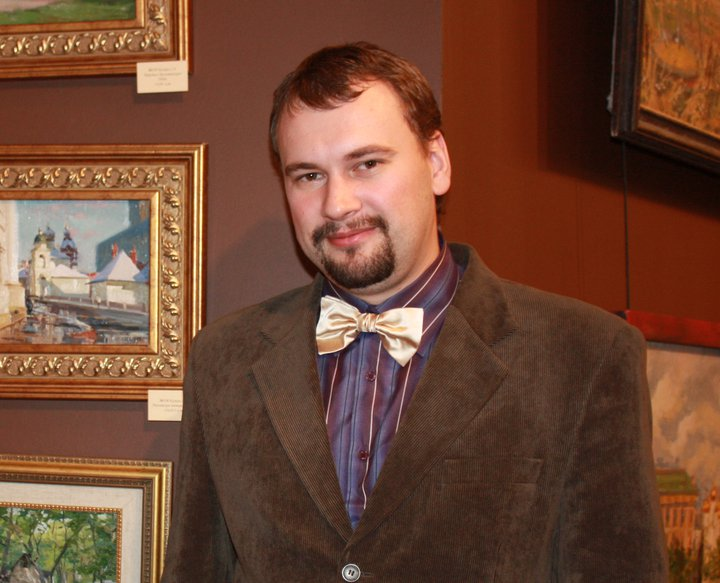
- Simon Kozhin in 2010. (aged 31)
- Born: March 11, 1979; Moscow, Soviet Union
- Citizenship: Russia
- Education: Russian Academy of Painting, Sculpture and Architecture
- Known for: painter, drawer and designer
- Style: Realism
- Children: Ustinia Semionovna Zlatovekhovnikova

Simon Leonidovitch Kozhin (Russian: Семён Кожин, sometimes Kojin; born March 1979) is a contemporary Russian artist. His art varies among genres, such as landscapes, portraits, still life, and historical photography. He also has an excellent knowledge of oil, tempera, and watercolor painting. He paints scenery whilst traveling the world, so there are a series of works such as England, Ireland, Malta, Turkey, Switzerland and others. He also painted a series of works devoted to Russia's war with Napoleon in 1812.

== Biography ==
Simon L. Kozhin is the son of father Kozhin Leonid Arcadievitch and mother Kozhina Irina Mikhailovna (Dayshutova). In 1998, he graduated from the Moscow Academic Art Lyceum. N.V. Tomsky. From 1998 to 2003, he studied art at the Fine Arts Academy in Moscow and completed his education in studio landscapes under the direction of Professor V. Afonin. He now lives and works in Moscow.

From 2000 to 2010, he participated in exhibitions in Russia and abroad.

== Exhibition ==
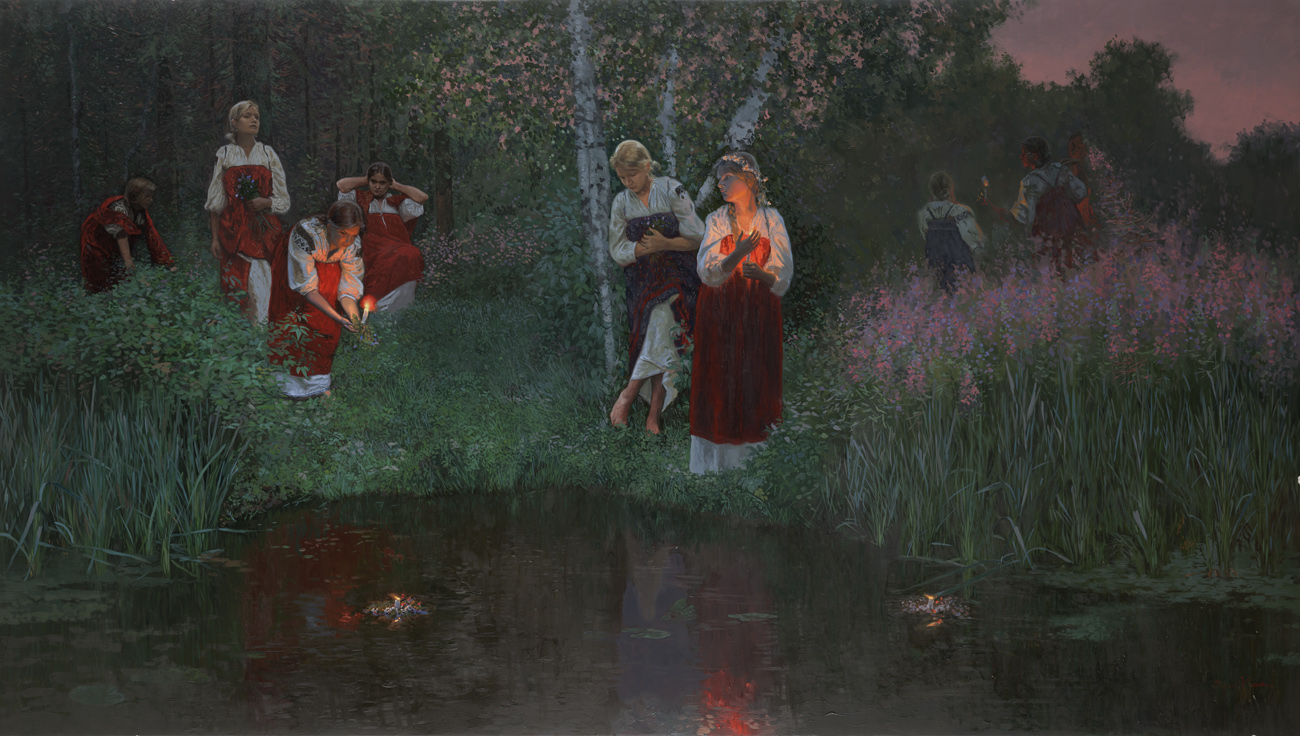
Simon Kozhin. Kupala Night, Divination on the Wreaths (2009).

Exhibitions with the participation of Simon Kozhin:

- 2001 - Exhibition hall in Haddenham, Buckinghamshire, UK.
- 2002 - Exhibition of the Primavera creative association at the Central House of Artists, Moscow
- 2003 - “Fresh Art”, exhibition mounted at the Business Design Centre, London, UK “All of us are a bit of a horse”, exhibition mounted at the On Staromonetny antiquity art gallery, Moscow
- 2004 - “Winter, winter, nothing but winter…”, exhibition mounted at the On Staromonetny antiquity art gallery, Moscow. “Flower Power”, exhibition at the Collyer-Bristow Gallery, London, UK
- 2005 - Exhibition of the Primavera creative association at the Central House of Artists, Moscow. Выставка в Лондоне в галерее «Collyer-Bristow», “Russian contemporary”, exhibition at the Collyer Bristow Gallery, London, UK (an exhibition space within the offices of law firm Collyer Bristow LLP). “Russian Traditions”, exhibition held at the exhibition hall of the State Scientific Research Institute of Restoration, Moscow. “Seasons”, exhibition mounted at the On Staromonetny antiquity art gallery, Moscow “Russian Traditions”, exhibition held at the Russian Embassy in the USA, Washington. “New Russian Painting”, exhibition mounted at the Oriel Gallery, Dublin, Ireland.
- 2006 - Contemporary Russian Painting, exhibition mounted at the Carlton Hotel, St. Moritz, Switzerland. “London–Paris–New York”, exhibition at the Collyer-Bristow Gallery, London, UK.
- 2007 - “20th Anniversary of the Russian Academy of Painting, Sculpture and Architecture”, exhibition at the Manezh Central Exhibition hall, Moscow. “Life Cycles Exhibition”, exhibition mounted in the crypt of St. Pancras Parish Church, London (the exhibition organized by the Bash Art, UK).
- 2008 - “Poetry of the Truth”, exhibition at Les Oreades Gallery in the Central House of Artists, Moscow. Exhibition in the Electric Systems of Russia central office, Moscow. “The Spring in Europe”, exhibition at the Oriel Gallery, Dublin, Ireland. “Alexander Kolotilov and young landscape painters of Russia”, exhibition at the N-Prospect, St. Petersburg
- 2008-2009 - Exhibitions at the Yelena Gallery, Moscow
- 2009 - “Contemporary Russian Painting”, exhibition at the Oriel Gallery, Dublin, Ireland. “Traditions of the Present Day”, exhibition in the framework of the project Game of Imagination mounted at the House of Feodor Chaliapin Museum and Exhibition Centre, Moscow. International Exhibition of calligraphy, painting and photography of Northeast Asia, Changchun, People's Republic of China. “Russian Art Week”, the 6th International Exhibition of contemporary art, Moscow House of Artists, Moscow “Attraction of Realism”, exhibition at the Izmailovo Gallery State Exhibition hall, Moscow.
- 2010 -“Road to Church”, exhibition at the N-Prospect Gallery, St. Petersburg. “For the First Time at the Central House of Artists”, exhibition initiated by the N-Prospect Gallery, Moscow “Heirs of the Traditions”, exhibition of works of art from the funds of Moscow Academic Art Lyceum at the Museum and Exhibition Centre of the Russian Academy of Arts, Moscow. “Moscow Hospitality”, exhibition at the Russian Estate Gallery, Moscow
- 2011 - “Klykovo. Seasons” exhibition mounted at the Image regional picture gallery, Kaluga and at the Kozelsk local history museum “Attraction of Realism”, exhibition mounted at the Izmailovo. Gallery State Exhibition hall, Moscow “Greatness in the Small”, exhibition held in the Central House of Artists, Moscow. “Russian Classical Painting”, exhibition in Yantai People's Republic of China. “Russian Classical Painting”, exhibition mounted at the Yellow River Art Gallery, Dongying, People's Republic of China. Participation in the project “P-bus stop” as part of the social art programme curated by the PERMM (Perm Museum of Modern Art), Perm.
- 2012 - “Visual Visible Images”, exhibition at the exhibition hall of the Russian Auction House in Gostiny Dvor, Moscow. “Dedicated to the 200th anniversary of the victory in the 1812 Patriotic War”, exhibition mounted at the Izmailovo Gallery State Exhibition hall, Moscow.
- 2012-2015 Exhibition at URALSIB | Bank 121, Moscow.
- 2015 - The exhibition "Crimean history", as part of the creative association "New itinerants" Central House of Architect. (Moscow) Exhibition of 37 winners of the "Children in the art" as part of the research project "The Imaginary Museum Mikhail Shemyakin. Anthology forms "in the Kaluga Museum of Fine Arts. (Kaluga)"The artist's palette. Simon Kozhin. History and Modernity "at the Exhibition Hall" Atrium "The Moscow State Integrated Art and Historical Architectural and Natural Landscape Museum-Reserve "Kolomenskoye – Izmailovo – Lefortovo - Lublino”. (Moscow)

== Works in collections ==
- State Central Museum of the Contemporary Russian History, Moscow, Moscow.
- Kaluga Museum of Fine Arts, Kaluga.
- Museum Fund of the Moscow Academic Art Lyceum Moscow.
- Museum of the Russian Academy of Painting, Sculpture and Architecture, Moscow.
- Foundation "Cultural Heritage, St. Petersburg.
- The Penza Regional Art Gallery of K.A. Savitskiy Penza.
- The Moscow State Integrated Art and Historical Architectural and Natural Landscape Museum-Reserve"Kolomenskoye", Moscow.
- Maloyaroslavets Military History Museum of the 1812 War, Maloyaroslavets.

== Filmography ==
- 2011 — The Creator - not a craftsman — a documentary film about creative work Simon Kozhin (directed by Vladislav Artamonov)
- 2015 — People who made the earth round — Artist

== Bibliography ==
- 2004 Publication of illustrations of the tale by the Brothers Grimm Rapunzel log TALES in London.
- 2004 Publication of illustrations to the book Luciano Pavarotti in Korean (published by Montessori).
- 2005 Publication of the Bank of Petrocommerce calendar with views of Moscow.
- 2005 Publication of illustrations to a fairy tale Brothers Grimm Rapunzel

Published by Russian mission

- Astakhov Y. One Thousand of Russian artists. – Moscow: White Town, 2006.S. 1040.ISBN 5-7793-1000-9
- Zlatoverhovnikova O.N. Kozhin Simon. – Moscow: Print Suite, 2007. S. 234.
- Astakhov, Y. Historical Paintings. " – Moscow: White Town, 2008.S. 936. ISBN 978-5-7793-1579-1
- Zlatoverhovnikova O.N. Kozhin Simon. – Moscow: White Town, 2009. C. 64. ISBN 978-5-7793-1718-4
