= Lubov Rabinovich =

Russian artist (1907–2001)

- Born: 1907; Liepāja, Russian Empire
- Died: 2001 (aged 93–94); Moscow, Russia
- Known for: Painter
- Notable work: "First Wedding on Virgin Soil", "Kuban – The Reds Have Come", "On a Farm"

Lubov Semenova Rabinovich, (Любовь Семеновна Рабинович) (1907 in Liepāja, Russian Empire – 2001 in Moscow, Russia) was a Jewish Soviet Russian painter. She was most noted for her works depicting rural life and particularly life in the newly created settlements of the Virgin Lands Campaign.

Rabinovich began her studies in 1921 at the Lepeshinsky (МОПШК) experimental art-school commune in Moscow, where she was taught drawing by Yakov Aleksandrovich Bashilov. The artist's work was first exhibited in 1925 as part of the 8th AKhRR (Association of Artists of Revolutionary Russia) Exhibition. Lubov Rabinovich studied at the Proletarian Institute of Art in Moscow, graduating in 1930. She went on to study at the Institute of Painting, Sculpture and Architecture in Leningrad where she studied under A. Savinov and K. Petrov Vodkin. She was awarded a diploma in 1936 for the painting "Kuban, 1920 – The Reds Have Come".

The next five years Rabinovich taught in Saratov, becoming the head of the local artist's union in 1939. During the Second World War, she supervised the "Agitokon" art collective (also in Saratov).

After the war ended, Rabinovich came to Stalingrad, and participated in work on the Volga–Don Canal.

In the spring of 1954, Rabinovich, with a brigade of fellow artists journeyed to southern Siberia as part of Khrustchev's Virgin Lands Campaign, working on a collective farm in the Omsk Region and at the Bratsk Hydroelectric Power Station. The artist later moves to the Novosibirsk Akademgorodok and becomes familiar with several scientists of the Siberian branch of Academy of Sciences.

Rabinovich continued to travel throughout the 1950s and 1960s, visiting (and painting) the White Sea, The Crimea, Pushkin, Dubna, Stalingrad, Novorossisk, The Baltics, and Pereslavl-Zalessky

The artist's works of the period capture the self-confidence and optimism of the many ambitious Soviet projects of the period as well as more pastoral scenes and portraits. Notable works include: "First wedding on Virgin Soil" (1959), "The Student (The Thirtieth is Difficult)" (1963), and "On a farm" (1970).

Many of Rabinovich's works are held in state and private collections of Russia, such as the Tretyakov Gallery and the Radishchev Art Museum. Her works are also held by collections in Kazakhstan, France, Belgium and the USA.
