= Félia Litvinne =

French opera singer (1860–1936)

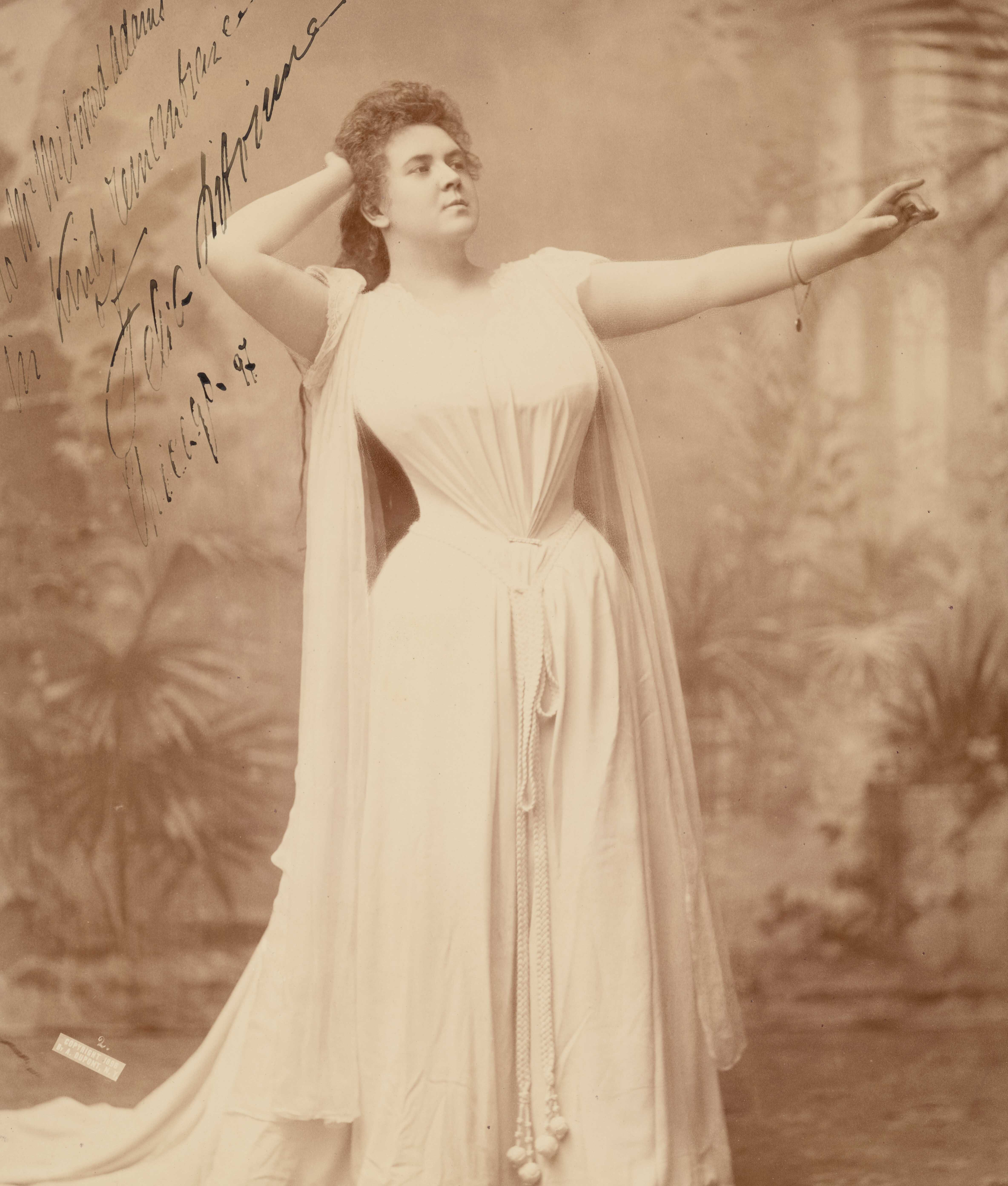
Litvinne in 1896. Photo by Aimé Dupont (Newberry Library, Chicago)

Félia Litvinne (Note: Russian: Фелия Васильевна Литвин, romanized: Feliya Vasilyevna Litvin.) (born Françoise-Jeanne Schütz; (Note: Russian: Франсуаза Васильевна Шютц, romanized: Fransuaza Vasilyevna Shyuts.) 11 October 1860, Saint Petersburg – 12 October 1936, Paris) was a Russian-born, French-based dramatic soprano. She was particularly associated with Wagnerian roles, although she also sang a wide range of parts by other opera composers.

== Life and career ==
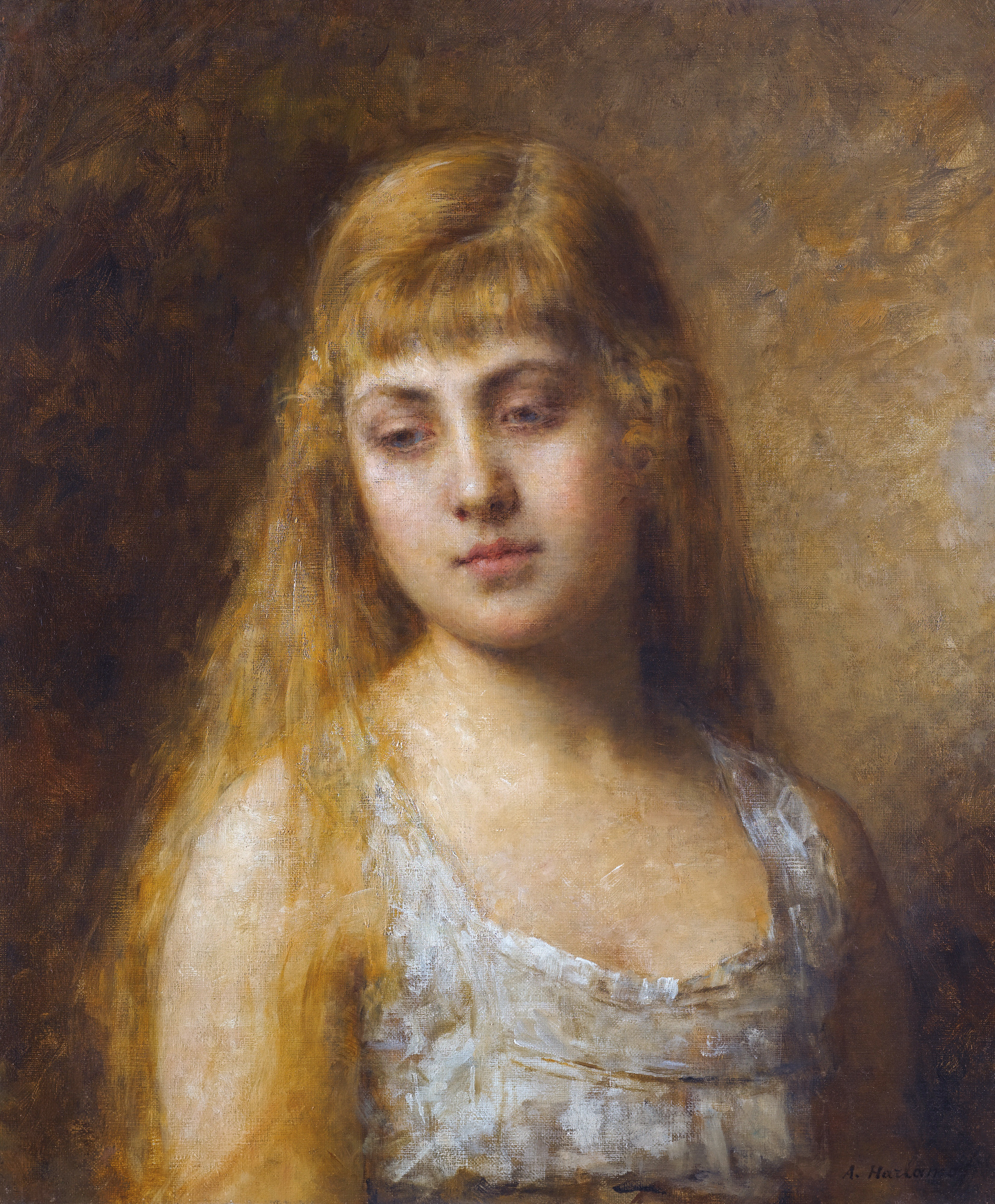
Young Félia Litvinne (Alexei Harlamov)

Françoise-Jeanne Schütz was born in Saint Petersburg, Russia, in 1860. Her father was Russian, and her mother was French-Canadian (from Canada East). After study in Russia, Switzerland and Italy, she became multi-lingual. Then, she moved with her family to Paris, where she studied singing with Madame Barthe-Banderali for three years and took lessons with Pauline Viardot and Victor Maurel. She possessed a wide range, encompassing both mezzo-soprano and soprano coloratura roles. She made her stage debut at the Théâtre-Italien in 1883, as Amelia in Verdi's Simon Boccanegra, as a last-minute replacement for Fidès Devriès.

Litvinne's career rapidly became international in scope. During the course of the next three decades she appeared at the Academy of Music in New York, at the Paris Opera, at La Scala in Milan, at the Rome Opera, at La Fenice in Venice, at the Royal Opera House, Covent Garden, in London and at the Théâtre de la Monnaie in Brussels. Tsarist Russia's two main cities, Moscow and Saint Petersburg, experienced her vocal artistry as well.

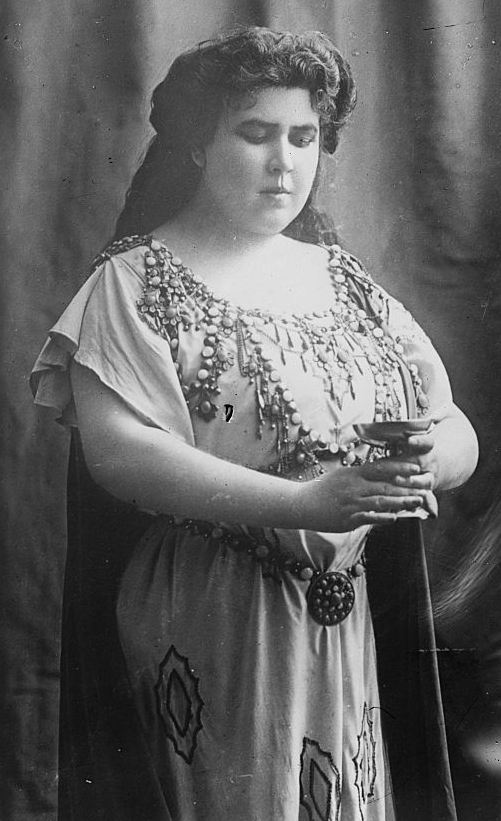
Photo by Paul Boyer (Library of Congress)

Litvinne first sang in New York in 1885–1886 with the Mapleson Company. She made her Metropolitan Opera debut in that city on 25 November 1896, as Valentine in Meyerbeer's grandest work, Les Huguenots. She sang at the Met for only one season, however. Her other roles there included Verdi's Aida, Mozart's Donna Anna, Massenet's Chimène, Meyerbeer's Sélika, and Wagner's Brünnhilde and Isolde.

Paris became Litvinne's base. She took part in the premieres of three works by Camille Saint-Saëns, Hélène, L'ancêtre and Déjanire, as well as of Camille Erlanger's Bacchus triomphant. Livinne also won acclaim for her splendid singing in revivals of two 18th-century operas by Gluck, namely Alceste and Armide. In 1915, she sang Aida at Monte Carlo opposite Enrico Caruso. Her last operatic appearances were at Vichy in 1919 but she continued giving recitals until 1924.

== Last years and death ==
In retirement, she taught at the American Conservatory in Fontainebleau. Among her pupils were the sopranos Nina Koshetz and Germaine Lubin. She published a book of Conseils et exercices in 1924 while her autobiography, Ma vie et mon art, was released in 1933. She died in Paris three years later, one day after her 76th birthday.

== Recordings ==
Using an Archéophone for the transcription, the 35 surviving records of Litvinne have been released complete on CD by Marston Records (52049-2). This release also contains extensive liner notes dealing with her career and voice.

== Sources ==
- Le dictionnaire des interprètes, Alain Pâris, (Éditions Robert Laffont, 1989); ISBN 2-221-06660-X
- The Record of Singing (Volume One), Michael Scott, (Duckworth, London, 1977).
- The Concise Oxford Dictionary of Opera, (second edition), Harold Rosenthal & John Warrack (Oxford University Press, London, 1980).
