= Nikolai Shulpinov =

Russian painter

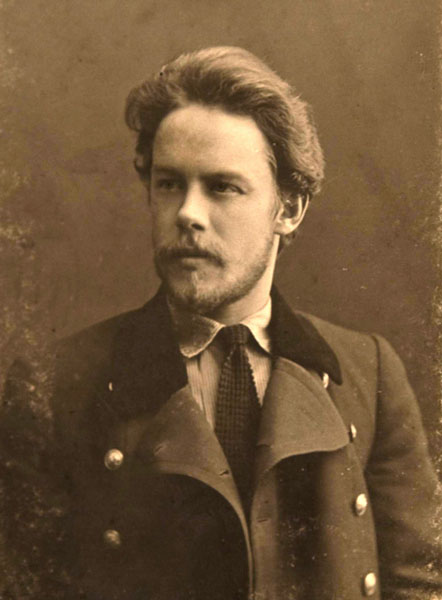
- Portrait, late 1900s
- Born: 27 November 1885; Vesyegonsk, Russia
- Died: 7 August 1921 (aged 35); Tomsk, Russia
- Education: Kazan Art School, Moscow School of Painting, Sculpture and Architecture
- Movement: Peredvizhniki

Nikolai Semyonovich Shulpinov (Russian: Николай Семёнович Шулпинов; (1885-1921) was a Russian landscape painter, associated with the Peredvizhniki. He is best known for his scenes from the Altai Mountains.

== Biography ==
He was born to a family of the Russian nobility and graduated from the Kazan Art School, where he studied sculpture with Prokofy Dzyubanov (1874-1951) and painting with Hristofor Skornyakov (1862-?).

In 1911, he was granted the right to enroll at the Moscow School of Painting, Sculpture and Architecture. Four years later, he was awarded the title of "Artist", first degree. In 1916, he became a member of the Peredvizhniki; participating in their 44th, 45th and 46th exhibitions.

The following year, together with his former classmates, the architect Vasily Polatenko and the sculptor Yakov Alexandrovich Bashilov (1882-1940), he helped establish the "Общество художников московской школы" (Society of Artists from the Moscow School), which eventually had more than sixty members.

At the end of that year, probably in response to the October Revolution, he moved to Biysk. Not long after, he moved again, to Gorno-Altaysk, where he taught school, participated in the activities of the Barnaul Heritage Club and helped organize the Altai Art Society.

Tomsk was a major center for the White movement during the Russian Civil War, but it is not known if his death was related to that in any way. In 1924, seventy of his paintings were shown at a major retrospective of his work in Moscow, but many of his works have been lost. To celebrate the acquisition of three previously unknown works in 2009, the State Museum of Altai Territory held a special exhibition called "Nikolai Shulpinov. In search of the Siberian style."

== Selected paintings ==
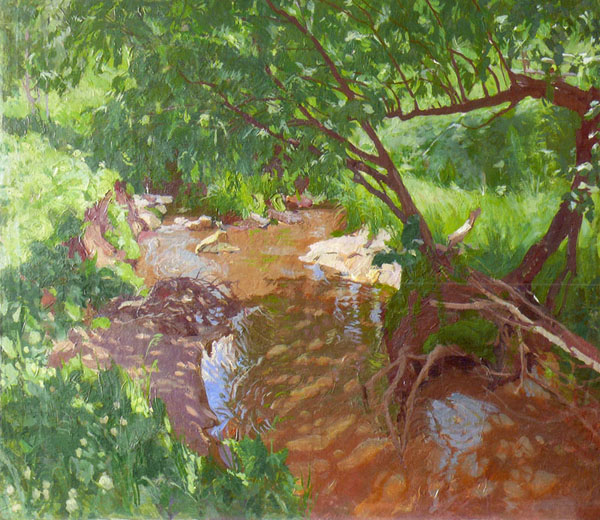
Small Settlement near Paspaul

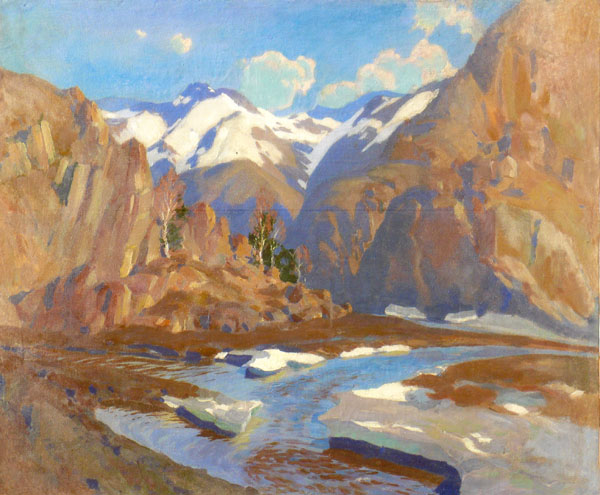
Spring in the Mountains

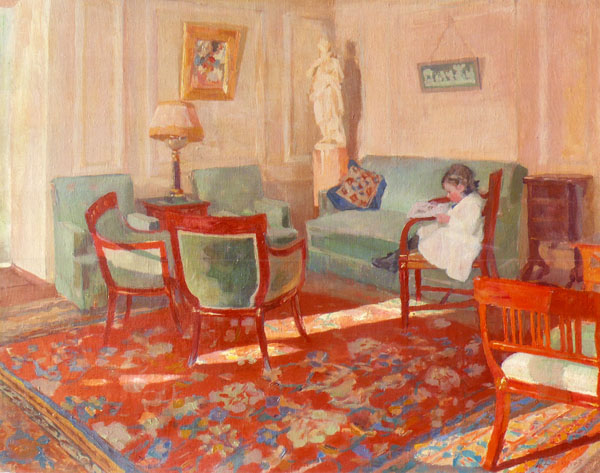
Interior

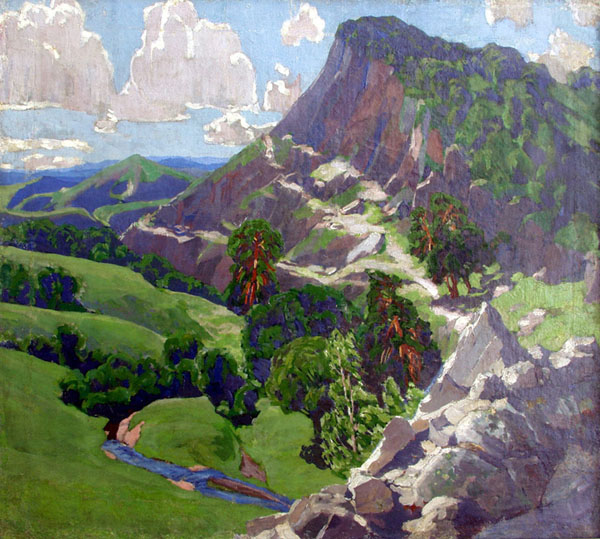
Mountain Landscape
