= Olga Tsutskova =

Russian painter (born 1952)

Olga Tsutskova (Russian: О́льга Петро́вна Цуцко́ва; June 6, 1952) is a Russian painter who lives in Saint-Petersburg. Her works have been displayed in a number of exhibitions in Petersburg and other cities of Russia.

Her painting The Philosophers' ship has been dedicated to one of its passengers, Lev Karsavin.

== Exhibitions ==
- 1979 "Spring Exhibition" Artists' Union Exhibition Hall, Leningrad
- 1980 "Youth of the Word" Artists' Union Exhibition Hall, Leningrad
- 1981 "My Contemporaries" The Central Exhibition Hall "Manezh", Leningrad
- 1982 "Autumn Exhibition" Artists' Union Exhibition Hall, Leningrad
- 1982 "My country" The Central Exhibition Hall "Manezh", Leningrad
- 1983 "My Leningrad" Okhta Exhibition Hall, Leningrad
- 1983 "Autumn Exhibition" The Central Exhibition Hall "Manezh", Leningrad
- 1984 "Youth of the World" Okhta Exhibition Hall, Leningrad
- 1984 "Artists in struggle for peace" National Exhibition "Маnezh", Moscow
- 1984 "My Leningrad" The Central Exhibition Hall "Manezh", Leningrad
- 1985 "Artists and Peace" The Palace of Youth, Leningrad
- 1985 "Youth and World" The Central Exhibition Hall "Manezh", Leningrad
- 1985 "Regional Exhibition" The Central Exhibition Hall "Manezh", Leningrad
- 1986 "Spring Exhibition" The Central Exhibition Hall "Manezh", Leningrad
- 1986 "Youth spring exhibition" Artists' Union Exhibition Hall, Leningrad
- 1986 "My Contemporaries" The Central Exhibition Hall "Manezh", Leningrad
- 1987 "Youth of the World" National Exhibition "Маnezh", Moscow
- 1988 "Modern Art from Leningrad" The Central Exhibition Hall "Manezh", Leningrad
- 1991 "Regional Exhibition" The Central Exhibition Hall "Manezh", Leningrad
- 1991 "14 modern Russian artists" Kunsthandel F.Kleijn Utrecht, Netherlands
- 1992 "Contemporary Art from the "Аnnа" gallery" The Kunst center "Sint-Jan" Bruges, Belgium.
- 1993 Personal Exhibition "Аnnа" gallery, Saint Petersburg
- 1993 "Autumn Exhibition" Union Artists' Exhibition center, Saint Petersburg
- 1993 "Contemporary Art from the "Аnnа" collection" Los Angeles, United States
- 1994 "Boras community center", Sweden, Stockholm
- 1995 "Jean art center", Seoul, South Korea.
- 1998 "Connecting ages" The Central Exhibition Hall "Manezh", Saint Petersburg
- 2003 "70th anniversary of St. Petersburg Artists' Union" The Central Exhibition Hall "Manezh", Saint Petersburg
- 2003 "300th anniversary of St. Petersburg" Artists' Union Exhibition center, Saint Petersburg
- 2007 Personal Exhibition "Russian idea. Philosophical steam-ship" The Central Exhibition Hall "Manezh" Saint Petersburg

== Sources ==
- Professor Michael German, Modern art gallery. Anna. Leningrad. Leningrad, 1989.
- Связь времен. 1932—1997. Художники — члены Санкт—Петербургского Союза художников России. Каталог выставки. — Санкт — Петербург: ЦВЗ "Манеж", 1997. — с.301.
- Elena Kashchenko, Olga Sokurova, "Русская Идея. Философский пароход О.П.Цуцковой. Размышления о картине." Петербургские искусствоведческие тетради, АИС. СПб, 2008. Выпуск 12. С. 20
