= Fedor Antonov =

Soviet artist (1904–1990)

Fedor Vasilevich Antonov
- Born: 1904; Tambov, Russian Empire
- Died: 1990 (aged 85–86); Moscow, Soviet Union
- Education: VKhUTEMAS
- Known for: Painting, textile design, posters
- Notable work: Soviet Air Forces poster (1942)
- Movement: Monumentalist style

Fedor Vasilevich Antonov (1904–1990) was a Soviet artist. He was born to a working-class father in Tambov, and there first studied art, from 1916 to 1920. He subsequently moved to Moscow, and from 1922 to 1929 studied at VKhUTEMAS, a state art school. In 1927 he began exhibiting and by 1931 he had become a member of IzoBrigada.

During the 1920s and 1930s Antonov worked successfully as a textile designer in the monumentalist style, eventually working as an instructor at the Moscow Textile Institute. Additionally, he worked as a painter during the 1930s and 1940s, becoming known for his sentimental thematic and portrait paintings, often employing bright and pure colors. On August 15, 1942, his poster of the Soviet Air Forces emphasizing the violence of women was made and, on August 31, published on the front page of Literature and Art with 50,000 editions. He died in Moscow.
