= Albert Bakun =

Russian painter

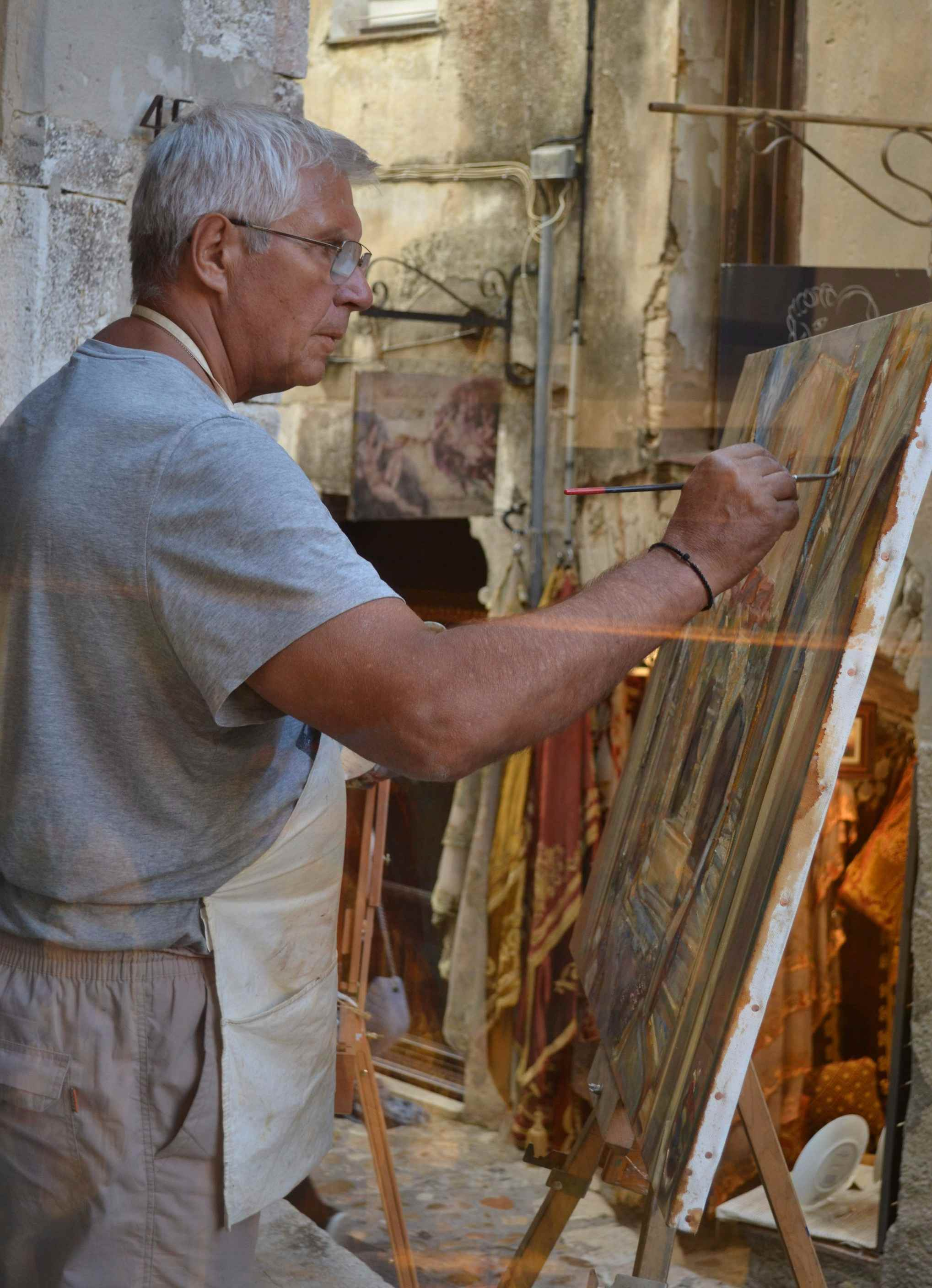
- France 2014
- Born: August 21, 1946; Vyborg, Russia
- Known for: Painting

Albert Alexandrovich Bakun (russian:Альберт Александрович Бакун) (Born 21 August 1946) is a Russian painter and part of the art group Hermitage.

== Biography ==
Albert Bakun was born on August 21, 1946, in workers family in Vyborg near Léningrad.

1961-1962: Attended the Fine Arts Studio of Vyborg.

1962-1967: Entered into and graduated from the Tauride (named after Nicholas Roerich) Leningrad Art School (LAS), the Faculty of Painting and Pedagogy.

1964: Having been referred by the LAS, he started to independently work at the State Hermitage Museum. His first work was the analytical interpretation of replica of the Pergamon Altar.

1967-1973: Educated at the Moscow Polygraphic Institute, Faculty of art and Technical Editing, Graphic Artist speciality area.

1968: Class Pedagogue, Alexander Pavlovich Zaytsev, recommended a young artist to Grigory Yakovlevich Dlugach1 for further studies of analytical painting in the State Hermitage.

1969-1998: Became a member of the Hermitage Group, participating in all of the group's exhibitions in Russia and abroad. Produced 32 analytical replications of the Old Masters of the Hermitage collection.

1993-2012: He continues to study on his own at the heritage site of the Old Masters at the State Hermitage.
