= Pyotr Nilus =

Ukrainian-Russian impressionist painter (1869-1943)

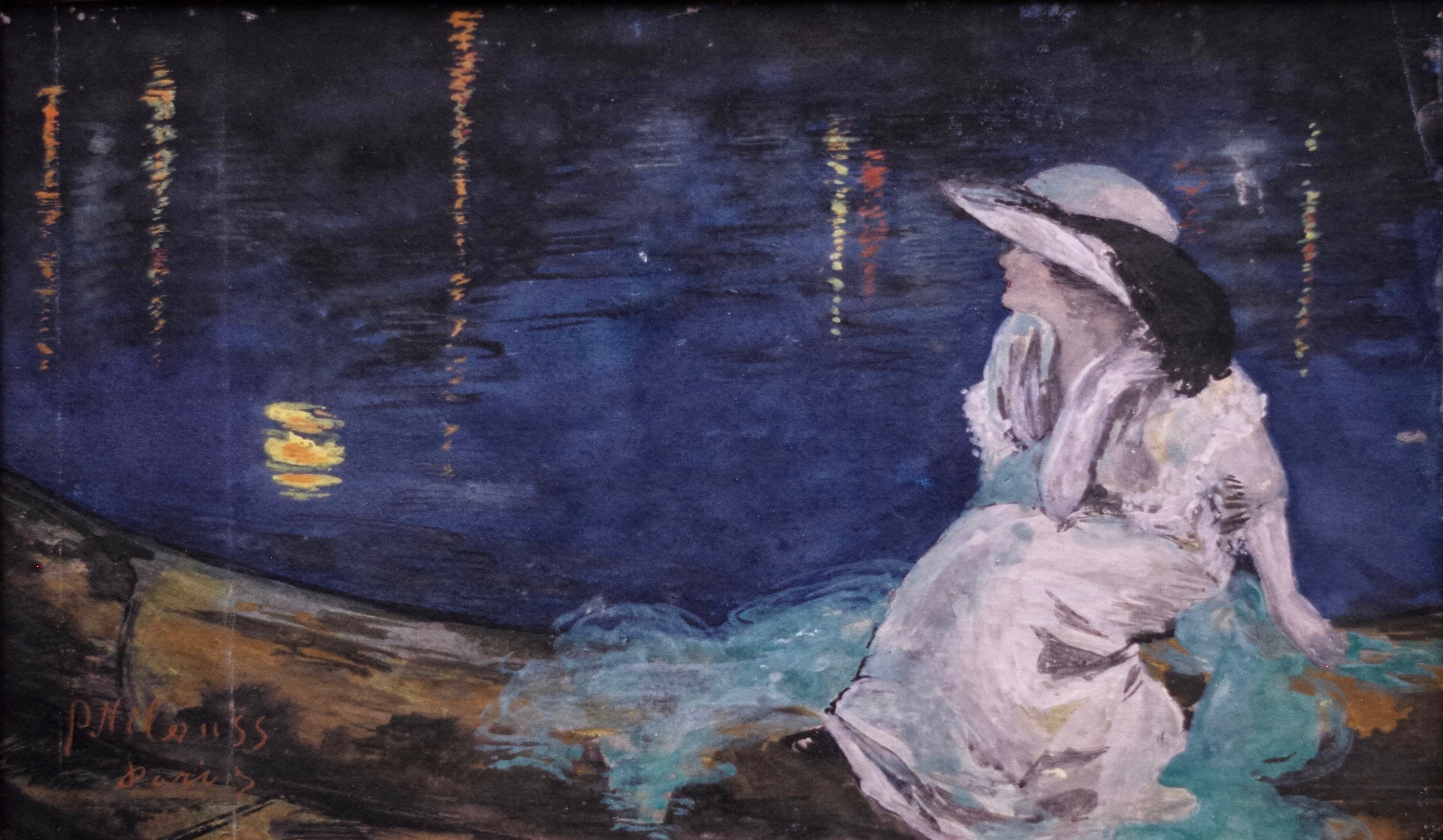
Woman Look at Seine River in Paris

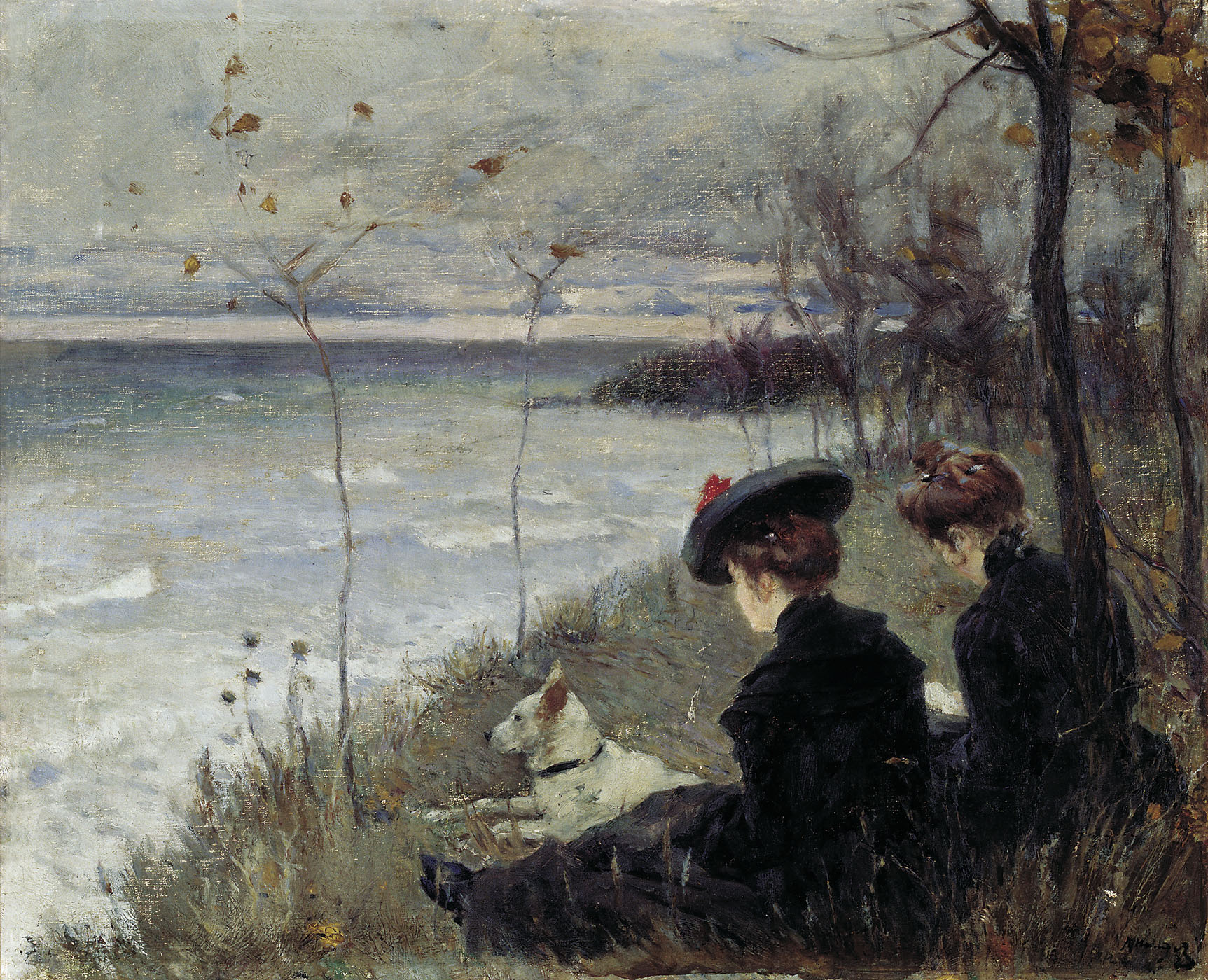
Pyotr Nilus. Autumn. 1893

Pyotr Alexandrovich Nilus (Russian: Пётр Александрович Нилус; 20 February [O.S. 8 February] 1869 – 23 May 1943) was a Russian and Ukrainian impressionist painter and writer.

Pyotr was born in Baltsky Uyezd, Government of Podolia, in the Russian Empire (present-day Ukraine). His grandfather took part in the Patriotic War of 1812. There has been some confusion about the origin of the surname "Nilus" in Russia. This was primarily in the context of mystic Sergei Nilus, publisher of The Protocols of the Elders of Zion in Russia. Sergei's ancestry was variously reported as Swedish or Swiss (but more recent research has shown that he was of Livonian extraction), and Gregor Schwartz-Bostunitsch has claimed that the painter Pyotr Nilus was related to Sergei Nilus.

At the age of seven Pyotr moved to Odessa where he studied at the local Peter and Paul real school and attended art classes of Kyriak Kostandi. Then he attended the Imperial Academy of Arts in Saint Petersburg and participated in exhibitions of Peredvizhniki. In contrast to "antisemite" Sergei Nilus, Pyotr Nilus married a Jewess, one Berta Solomonovna, and in 1906 together with Korney Chukovsky he also participated in at literary and artistic collection for the benefit of "Jewish children who were orphaned during the October pogrom in Odessa".

During the Russian Civil War, in 1920, he emigrated to Paris where he worked until his death in 1943. Pyotr Nilus was a friend of Aleksandr Kuprin and Ivan Bunin. For the first years in Paris they lived in the same house. They led an intensive correspondence; there were published more than one hundred letters of Pyotr Nilus to Bunin.

== Paintings ==
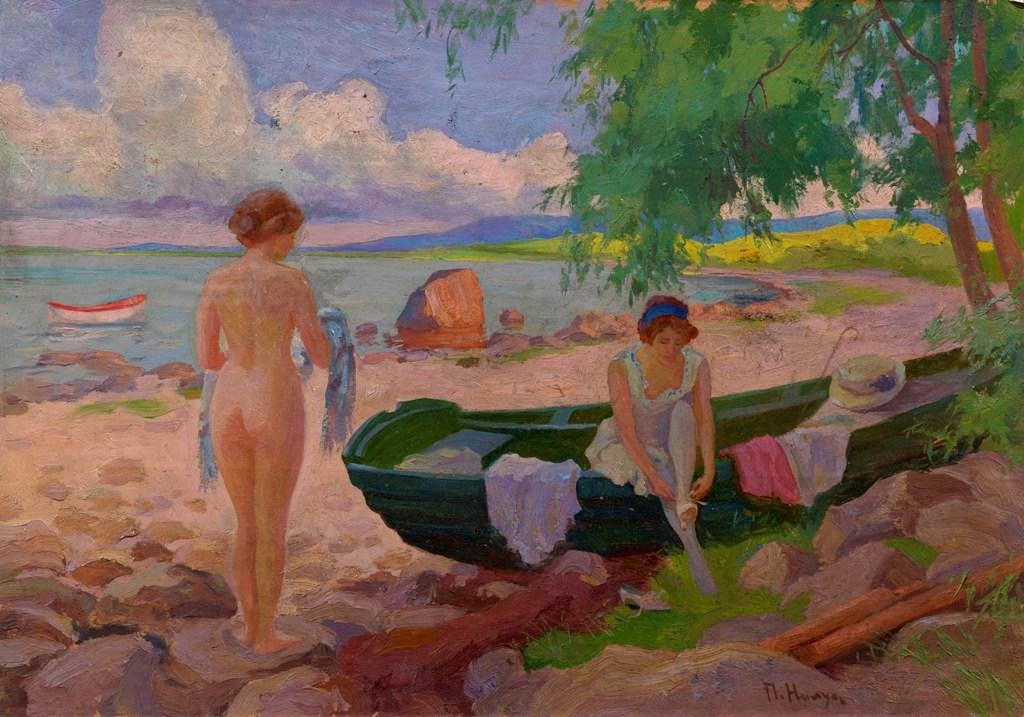
On the Beach

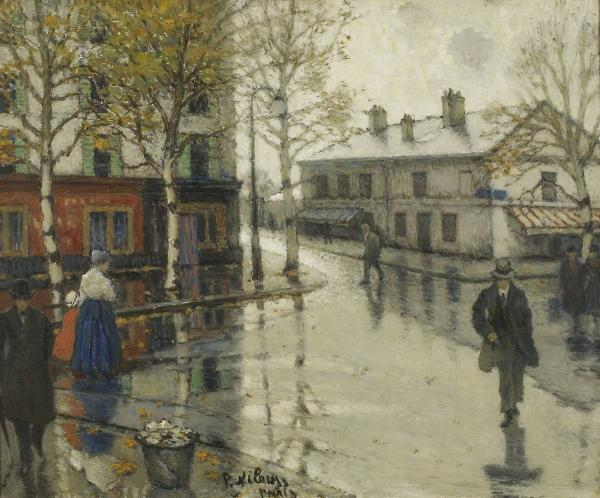
After the Rain

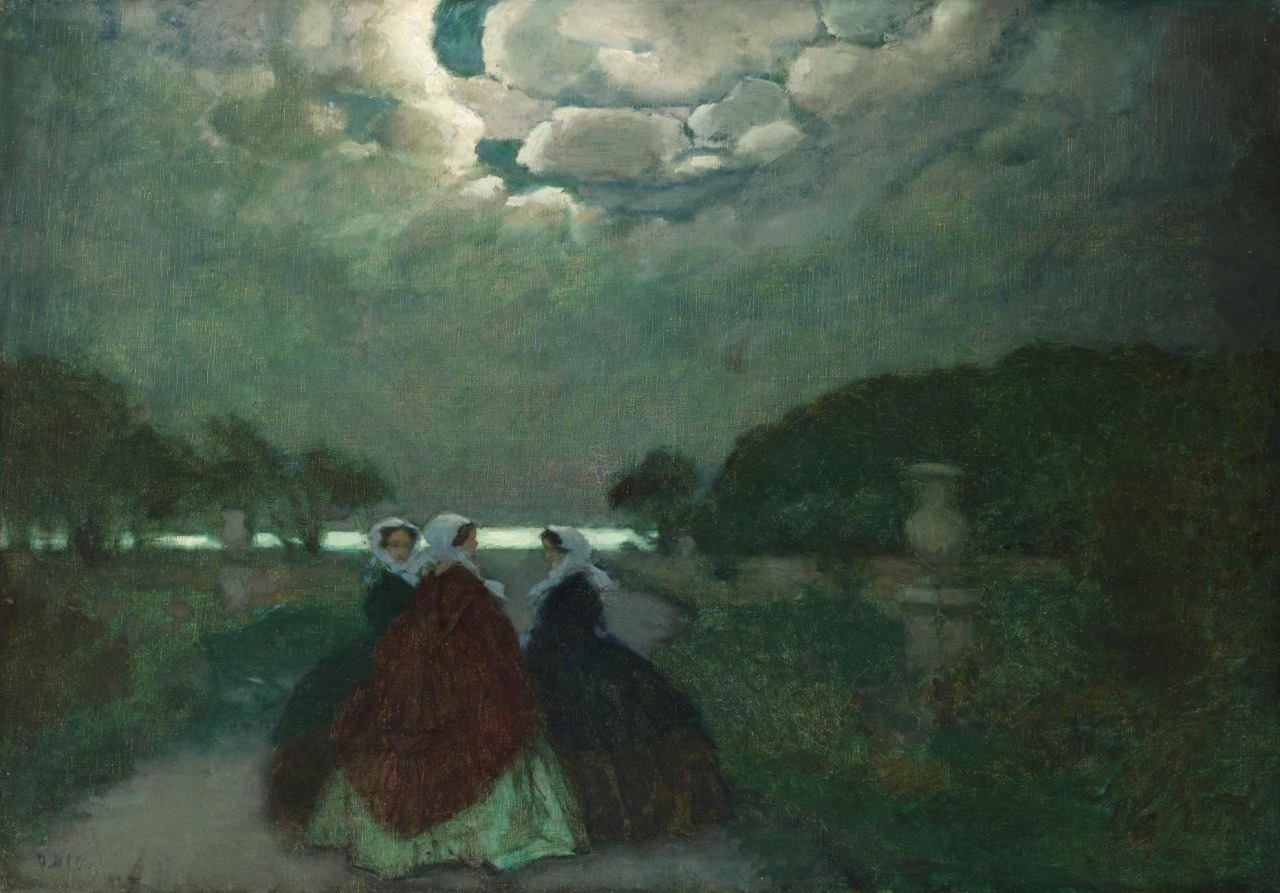
Three Women in the Park

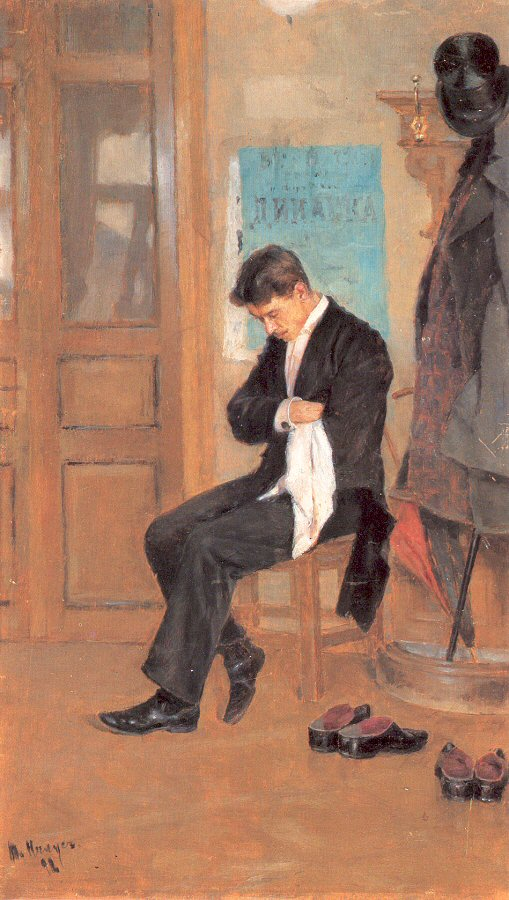
Footman (Morning)
