= Savinov =

Savinov (Russian: Савинов) is a Russian masculine surname, its feminine counterpart is Savinova. It may refer to

- Alexander Savinov (1881–1942), Russian painter and art educator
- Alexei Savinov (born 1979), Moldovan football assistant manager and former player
- Gleb Savinov (1915–2000), Russian painter, son of Alexander
- Irina Savinova (born 1979), Uzbekistani archer
- Ksenia Savinova (born 2011), Russian rhythmic gymnast
- Mariya Savinova (born 1985), Russian middle-distance runner
