= Olya Dubatova =

Russian painter

Olya Dubatova (Russian: Оля Дубатова, born July 8) is a Russian born visual artist. Since 2008 she has exhibited internationally. She lives in California and New York City.

== Work ==
Dubatova is a painter, filmmaker, and installation artist. She explores language, technology, time, place, sound, mapping, gender and identity through new media installation and performance.

From 2007 to 2011 her studio was in Rome, and she mostly exhibited in Europe. Her digital photography, interactive video art installations, films, sound, and single and multi-channel video works have been featured in numerous solo and group exhibitions and screenings in institutions such Berkeley Museum and Pacific Film Archive, Hammer Museum, Women’s Museum, LACDA (Los Angeles Center of Digital Art), BAWIFM, and Scuderie Aldobrandini Museum, Rome.

In 2014, Dubatova co-founded an art and technology center/ art lab at USC, her project a collaboration with Chris Kyriakakis (USC) as well as UCLA and Berklee College of Music.

Olya was invited to be an artist in residence at UC Berkeley in 2016.

In 2016 Olya, together with Greg Niemeyer and Archive.org, created installation Gifcollider, presented at BAMPFA in October 2016. The Magnes Collection of Jewish Art and Life commissioned a second version of gifCollider, "The Night Vision", for the "Power of Attention" Exhibit running through 2017. This version includes animations of a menorah design.
