= Vladimir Sosnovsky =

Ukrainian artist (1922–1990)

Volodymyr Sosnovsky
- Born: 1922
- Died: 1990 (aged 67–68)
- Education: Grekov Odesa Art School, Kyiv Art Institute

Vladimir Sosnovsky (Ukrainian: Володимир Сосновський; 1922–1990) was a Ukrainian artist, known as a landscape and realist painter. He was born in Nova Ushytsia, Khmelnitzky Region, Ukraine. In 1928 his family moved to Odesa. As a child he showed a love of drawing, and his parents sent him to art school.

In 1939, he joined the Grekov Odesa Art School, but with the onset of World War II, after completing only two years of study, he was asked to serve at the front. On his return in 1945, he continued his studies under well-known artist Leonid Mutchnik.

In 1948, he entered the Kyiv Art Institute and graduated in 1954. He then worked as a deputy director at the Odesa Western and Oriental Art Museum. From 1956 he taught painting at the Odesa Theatre and Art College until his death in 1990.
