= Nikolai Orlov (painter) =

Russian painter

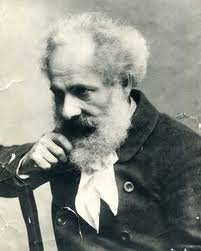
Nikolai Orlov (c.1920)

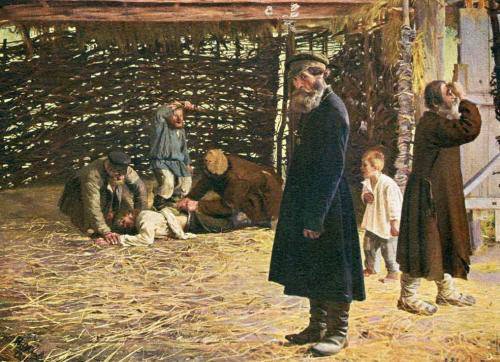
The Recent Past (Before the Flogging, 1904)

Nikolai Vasilyevich Orlov (Russian: Николай Васильевич Орлов; 8 May 1863, Buytsy, Tula Governorate - 5 August 1924, Moscow) was a Russian genre painter and art teacher; associated with the Peredvizhniki and a friend of Leo Tolstoy.

== Biography ==
His first art lessons came from his uncle, a local icon painter. From 1882 to 1892 he studied at the Moscow School of Painting, Sculpture and Architecture with Illarion Pryanishnikov and Vladimir Makovsky.

He graduated with a silver medal and his family moved to the village of Kuleshovo in Kaluga Governorate, where he painted decorations at the local church. In 1893, he began exhibiting with the Peredvizhniki and became a member in 1896. Two years later, he moved to the village of Obiralovka, near Moscow then, in 1902, to Moscow itself.

He became friends with Leo Tolstoy, with whom he shared many opinions, and was a frequent visitor to Yasnaya Polyana from 1907 to 1910. Tolstoy often referred to him as "my favorite artist" and wrote the foreword to a collection of Orlov's paintings called "Russian Peasants", published in 1909. In the summers from 1909 to 1912, he lived and worked at the estate of Leo's son, Sergei Tolstoy, a composer and ethnomusicologist, near Nikolskoye-Vyazemskoye in Tula Governorate. At this time, he also received some financial support from Maxim Gorky.

During the 1900s, he painted icons and church decorations in Tambov, Tula, Kaluga and Orel Governorates. From 1913 to 1919, he and his family lived quietly in Lipetsk; avoiding World War I and the Russian Revolution. While there, he taught drawing at a girls' school.

The Russian Civil War eventually led him to take his family to the Kuban, where he helped to organize a peasant commune. The war followed, however and, in 1922, gunmen raided the commune's warehouses, killing his son and two of his daughters in the process. After this tragedy, he settled in Maykop, but could not get over his grief, became ill, and returned to Moscow just before his death in 1924.
