= Oriel Gallery =

- Gailearaí Airgialla
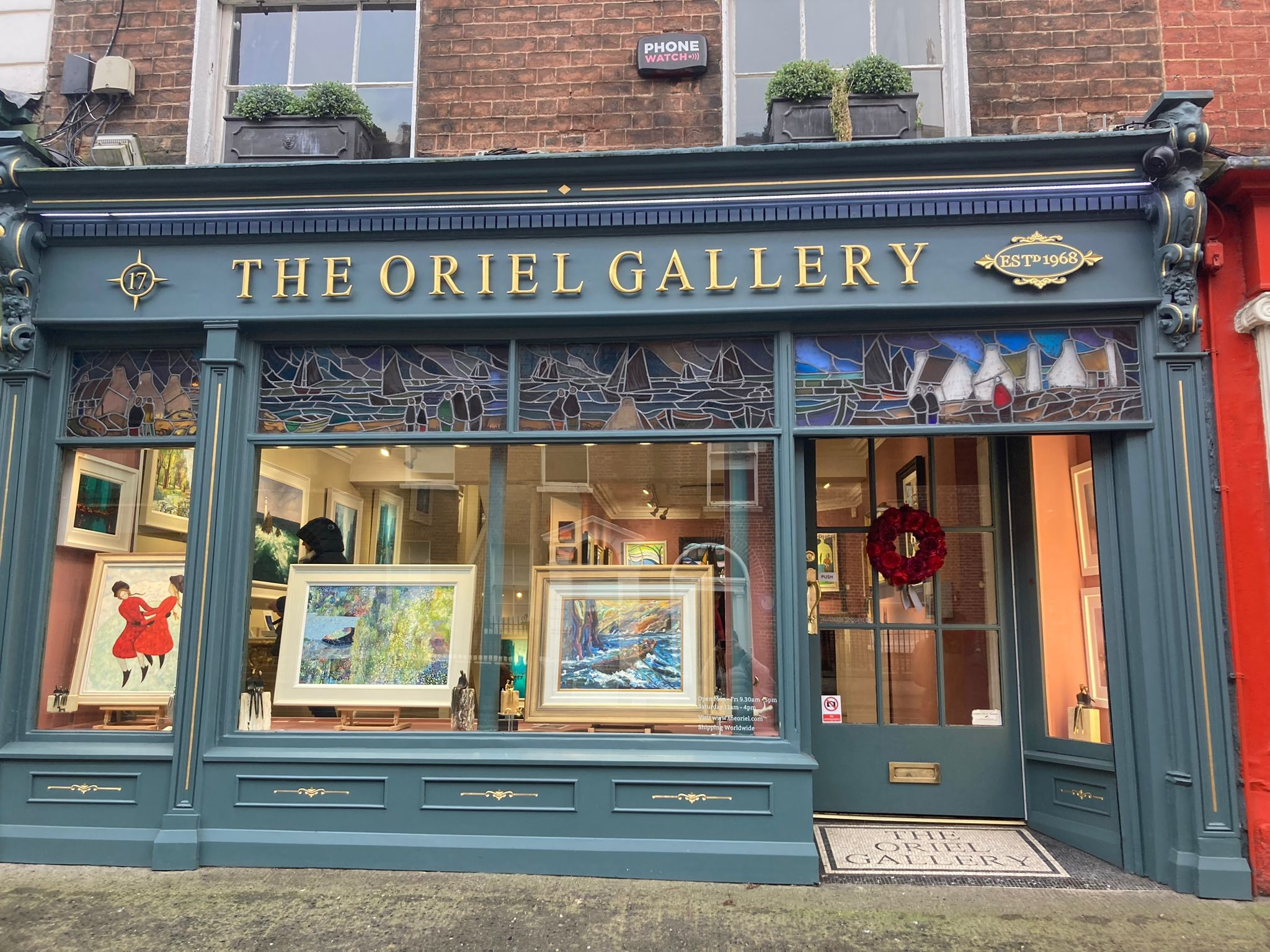
- The gallery in 2024

- Location within Central Dublin
- Established: 1968
- Location: 17 Clare Street, Dublin, Ireland
- Coordinates: 53°20′28″N 6°15′04″W
- Type: Contemporary art gallery
- Founder: Oliver Nulty
- Public transit access: Dublin Pearse; Dawson Street (Green Line)
- Website: theoriel.com

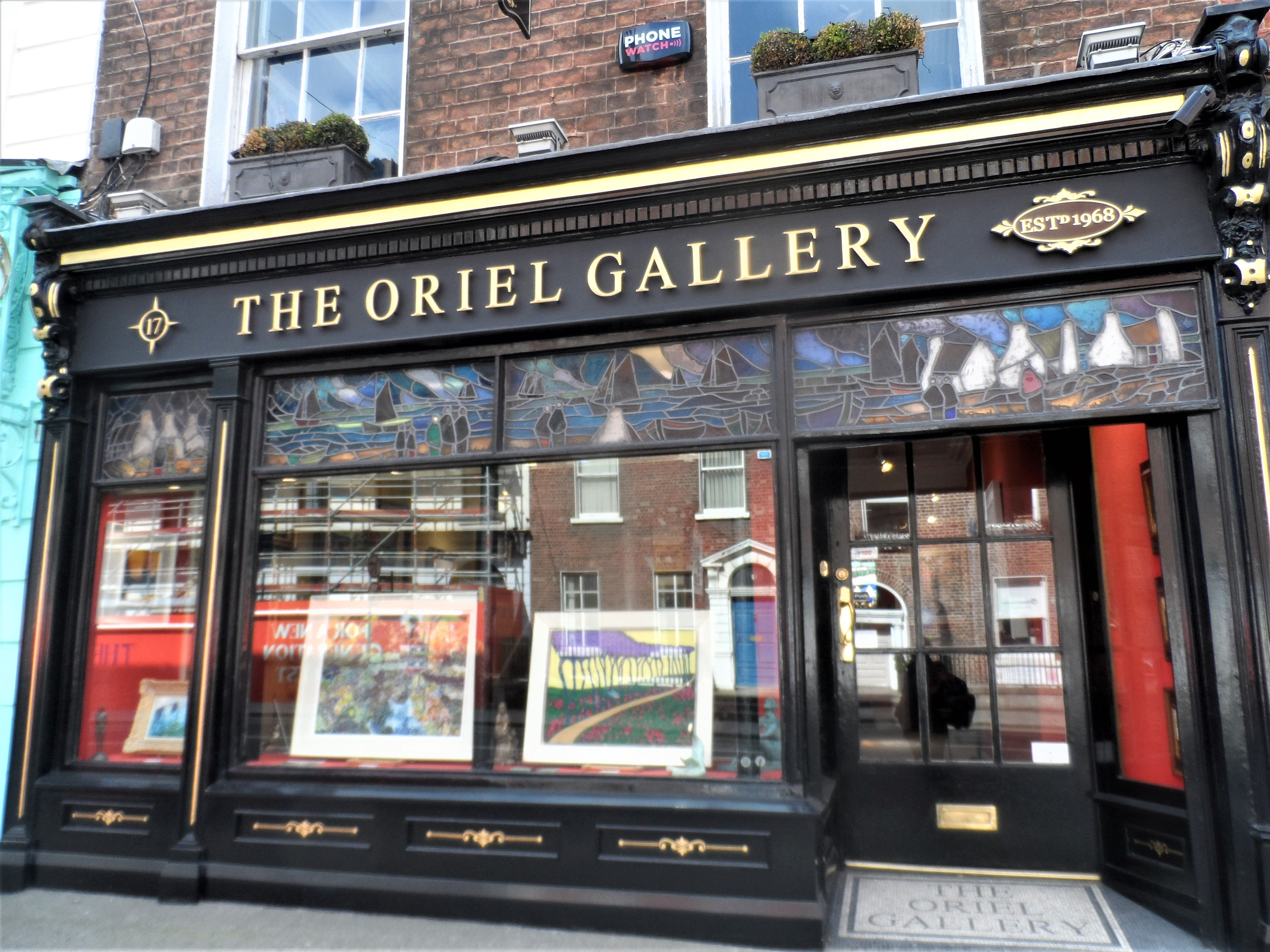
The gallery in 2019

The Oriel Gallery /ˈoʊriːəl/ is a commercial art gallery in Dublin, Ireland, devoted to work by Irish artists. It is Ireland's oldest independent gallery.

== History ==
Established in Dublin by Oliver Nulty in 1968, the title refers to the medieval Kingdom of Oriel (Airgíalla), which contained Nulty's hometown of Drogheda. Oriel can also refer to a type of window, or the Welsh word for "gallery." Oliver Nulty (d. 2005) commenced his life as an antiques dealer who, in the course of that work noticed Irish visual art was neglected. He collected for years before opening his gallery and famously said the cultural revival in Ireland was "a tale of two cities" whereas Dublin concentrated on literature, art was confined to Belfast. He also claimed that visual art in Ireland in the 40s, 50s and 60s was "the Cinderella of Irish culture." Nulty, who spotted a niche put fine pieces of Irish art through his gallery in his heyday, including all the heavyweights such as Yeats and Paul Henry. He produced many fine quality catalogues and had a special affection for everything to do with Percy French. Nulty created a market for French and some of the Percy French's he sold were snapped up by Irish-Americans. Nulty was the first mounting an Irish Women's avant-garde exhibition featuring Mainie Jellet, Evie Hone and others which was opened by President Mary Robinson. When Nulty established the Oriel there was no Irish art section in the National Gallery of Ireland.

== Associated artists ==
- Percy French
- Anthony Murphy
- Markey Robinson
- Nicholas Hely Hutchinson
- Henry Jones Thaddeus
- George Russell
- Paul Henry
