= Alexei Harlamoff =

Russian painter

- Алексей Алексеевич Харламов
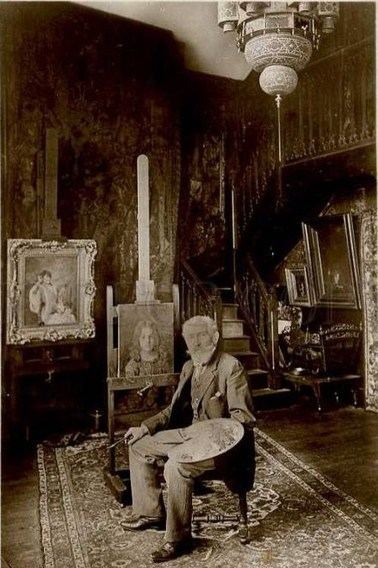
- Alexey Kharlamov in the workshop (1890)
- Born: 18 October 1840; Saratov Governorate
- Died: 11 April 1925 (aged 84); Paris
- Education: Member Academy of Arts (1874)
- Alma mater: Imperial Academy of Arts (1868)
- Known for: Painting
- Awards: Big Gold Medal of the Imperial Academy of Arts (1868)

Alexei Alexeievich Harlamov (also Alexej Harlamoff, Alexei Kharlamoff or Alexej Charlamoff) (1840–1925) was a Russian painter, who usually signed his name in the Latin alphabet as Harlamoff.

== Biography ==
=== 1840-1869: Saint Petersburg ===
Alexei Harlamoff was born into a family of serfs on 18 October 1840 in the village of Dyachevka near Saratov on the River Volga. In 1850 Harlamoff's parents won their freedom. Harlamoff became a guest student at the Imperial Academy of Arts in Saint Petersburg in 1854. Three years later he was awarded a second class silver medal for a drawing.

In 1862 Harlamoff was awarded a second class silver medal for a sketch, and he enrolled with the historical painter Alexey Tarasovich Markov. In 1863 he was awarded two first class silver medals, for a drawing and for a sketch. In 1865 he presented his large scale painting Ananias before the Apostles, but did not win the competition for a second class gold medal. The next year however he did win this award, for his painting Baptizing of the Kiever. He completed his studies in 1868, winning a first class gold medal for his Return of the Prodigal Son, and was granted a scholarship from the academy to study in Paris in 1869.

=== 1869-1874: Establishment in Paris ===
In 1870 Tsarina Maria Alexandrovna bought one of Harlamoff's paintings. In April he sent his first letter from Paris to Saint Petersburg. He spent September and October of that year in Normandy and the southern Netherlands with Alexey Bogolyubov, C. Huhn, and A. Lavezzari. He also travelled to Brussels and to London, where he visited an exhibition of Old Masters. In November the Academy of Arts commissioned him to copy Rembrandt’s Anatomy Lesson of Dr. Tulp, and he stayed in The Hague.

From Spring 1871 to Autumn 1872 Harlamoff copied The Anatomy Lesson of Dr. Tulp in a drawing and in oil. During the summer of 1871 he returned to Normandy. In November 1872 the Imperial Academy in Saint Petersburg paid him 1,500 roubles for the copy of Rembrandt.

In 1872 Harlamoff met Léon Bonnat and visited his independent studio. He was also awarded a bronze medal at the Vienna Universal Exhibition. The conference secretary of the Academy of Arts, Peter F. Iseyev, rejected Bogolyubov's request to grant Harlamoff a professorship. In December Bogolyubov reported to the council of the Imperial Academy of Arts on Harlamoff's visible success under the guidance of Bonnat.

By 1874 Harlamoff was living at rue Fontaine 42. He took part in the spring exhibition of the Imperial Academy of Arts. His portrait of the engraver Pozhalostin won him the title of art academy member. From April onwards Harlamoff joined the drawing evenings at Bogolyubov's residence in rue de Rome, 95. Around this time Ivan Turgenev mentioned Harlamoff for the first time in a letter, and his paintings are bought by Bogolyubov, the Parisian art dealer Adolphe Goupil and the Muscovite collector Dimitri P. Botkin. Harlamoff began socialising with Turgenev and other Russian artists in Paris. He was frequently invited for dinner with Louis Viardot and Pauline Viardot-Garcia in rue Douai 50, where Turgenev occupied the top floor. In June Harlamoff painted a portrait of Tsar Alexander II in Bad Ems, possibly spending the rest of the summer in Spain. He then travelled to Veules-les-Roses and Étretat. In October Turgenev wrote that Harlamoff had completed the portrait of Pauline Viardot, for which he was paid 3.000 FFR, leading to an increase of his fees for a portrait up to 10.000 FFR (around 3.000 roubles).

=== 1874 onwards: Success ===
In January 1875 Harlamoff completed a portrait of Elena Tretyakova in an evening dress. He began a portrait of Turgenev, which he finished in December. During this period he also accepted other commissions, and may have spent March in Spain. In May he exhibited at the Salon, where the portraits of Pauline Viardot-Garcia and Louis Viardot drew the attention of the Parisian press. He moved into the studio of the late Isidore Pils at Place Pigalle 11. During this year he was beginning to gain popularity with British art dealers. At New Years and the beginning of 1876 he visited Russia.

In 1876 the young soprano singer Félia Litvinne arrived from Saint Petersburg and started taking lessons with Pauline Viardot-Garcia. Turgenev purchased one of Harlamoff's paintings from Bogolyubov, entitled Gipsy Girl. Harlamoff joined the Society for Art Exhibitions at the Imperial Academy of Arts, in May he exhibited the portraits of Turgenev and Alphonse Daudet at the Salon.

Harlamoff and Turgenev visited the Imperial Academy of Arts in late May/early June 1877. Turgenev commissioned Harlamoff to portrait the bibliophile collector Alexandre F. Onegin (Otto). On 28 November 1877 (10 December) Harlamoff became a founding member of the Association of Russian Artists for the Mutual Support and Benefaction Abroad (President: the Russian minister in Paris Prince Nikolai A. Orlov, chairman: Bogolyubov, Secretary: Turgenev, purser: the banker Horace Günzburg).

In 1878 Harlamoff exhibited his paintings at the Salon and at the Universal Exhibition in Paris simultaneously. His portrait of Alexander F. Onegin was awarded a second class medal.

In 1879 Peter F. Iseyev asked Harlamoff to collaborate on decorating the Cathedral of Christ the Saviour in Moscow. He was also invited to exhibit at the elitist "Cercle de l’Union artistique" ("Club des Mirlitons"). For the first time Harlamoff was a visiting exhibitor at the Itinerant Art Exhibition in Russia. Ivan Kramskoi convinced Harlamoff to switch from the Society for Art Exhibitions at the Imperial Academy of Arts to the Association of the Itinerant Art Exhibitions, which he did in 1880. In 1879 he also travelled again to Spain, and to Biarritz, where he painted the prominent Russian publisher Andrey Krayevsky.

Through 1881 and 1882 Harlamoff exhibited three paintings at the All-Russian Exhibition Centre in Moscow. In 1883 Harlamoff was commissioned to portray Paul Demidoff, Prince of San Donato, and his family. He also travelled to Florence that same year. In 1885 he supported Bogolyubov's plan to found a museum in Saratov by donating his painting Italian Girl with a Lizard. He also took part in the 5th Exhibition of the Association of Watercolour Artists in Saint Petersburg. The next year Sergei M. Tretyakov recommended to his brother Pavel that he should purchase Harlamoff's Girl Laughing for the Tretyakov Gallery in Moscow.

In 1888, on Bogolyubov's suggestion, Vladimir Stasov exhibited Harlamoff's portrait of Turgenev at an Itinerant Art Exhibition. He was also exhibited at the International Exhibition in Glasgow, where Queen Victoria was reportedly impressed by his paintings. The next year Harlamoff joined the organizing committee of the Universal Exhibition in Paris, where he showed eleven of his paintings that year.

=== Later years ===
In 1891 Harlamoff organized the 50-year jubilee of Bogoliubov's activity. At the 19th Itinerant Art Exhibition in Saint Petersburg Tsarina Maria Fedorovna purchased his painting Portrait of a Young Girl. When Bogolyubov died in 1896 Harlamoff was nominated chairman of the Association of Russian Artists for the Mutual Support and Benefaction with its seat in Paris. In 1900 Harlamoff was appointed Chevalier of the Legion of Honour. He exhibited again at the Universal Exhibition in Paris, and after a break of eight years he participated again in the Itinerant Art Exhibition. In 1902 Harlamoff was awarded the medal of St. Vladimir (4th Class).

In 1909 Harlamoff moved to his new studio, Boulevard de Rochechouart, 57bis. Between 1911 and 1914 Harlamoff participated in exhibitions with Galerie Lemercier in Moscow. In 1922 Felia Litvinne showed the works of Harlamoff in her salon in Paris. Harlamoff died on 10 April 1925 in his studio on Boulevard de Rochechouart with Litvinne as his sole heir.

== Works ==
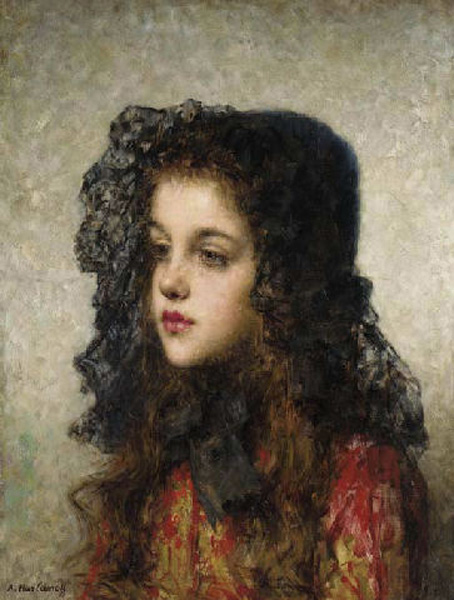
Little Girl with Veil

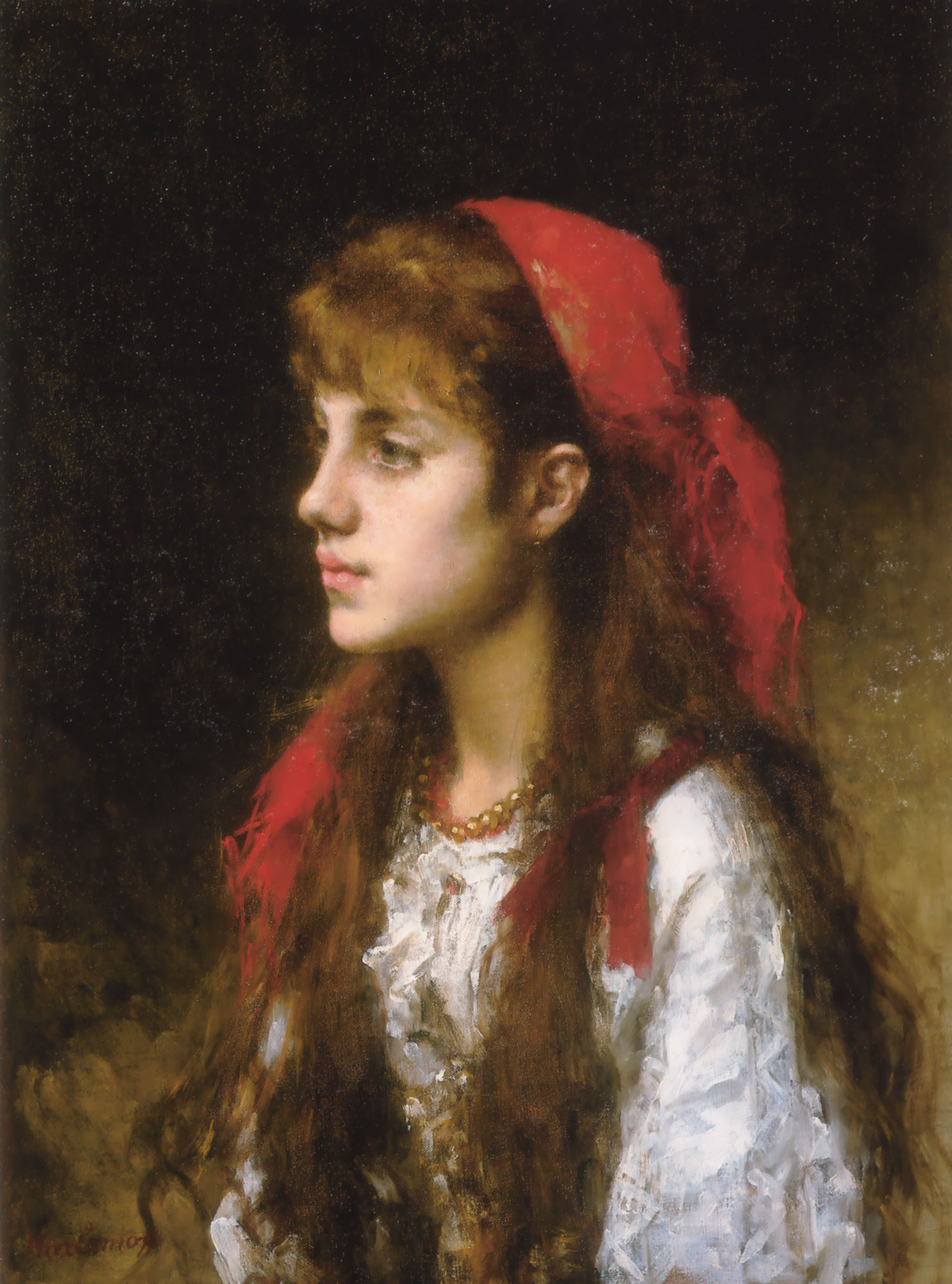
A Russian Beauty

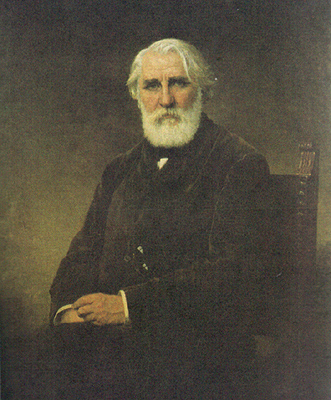
Turgenev (1875)

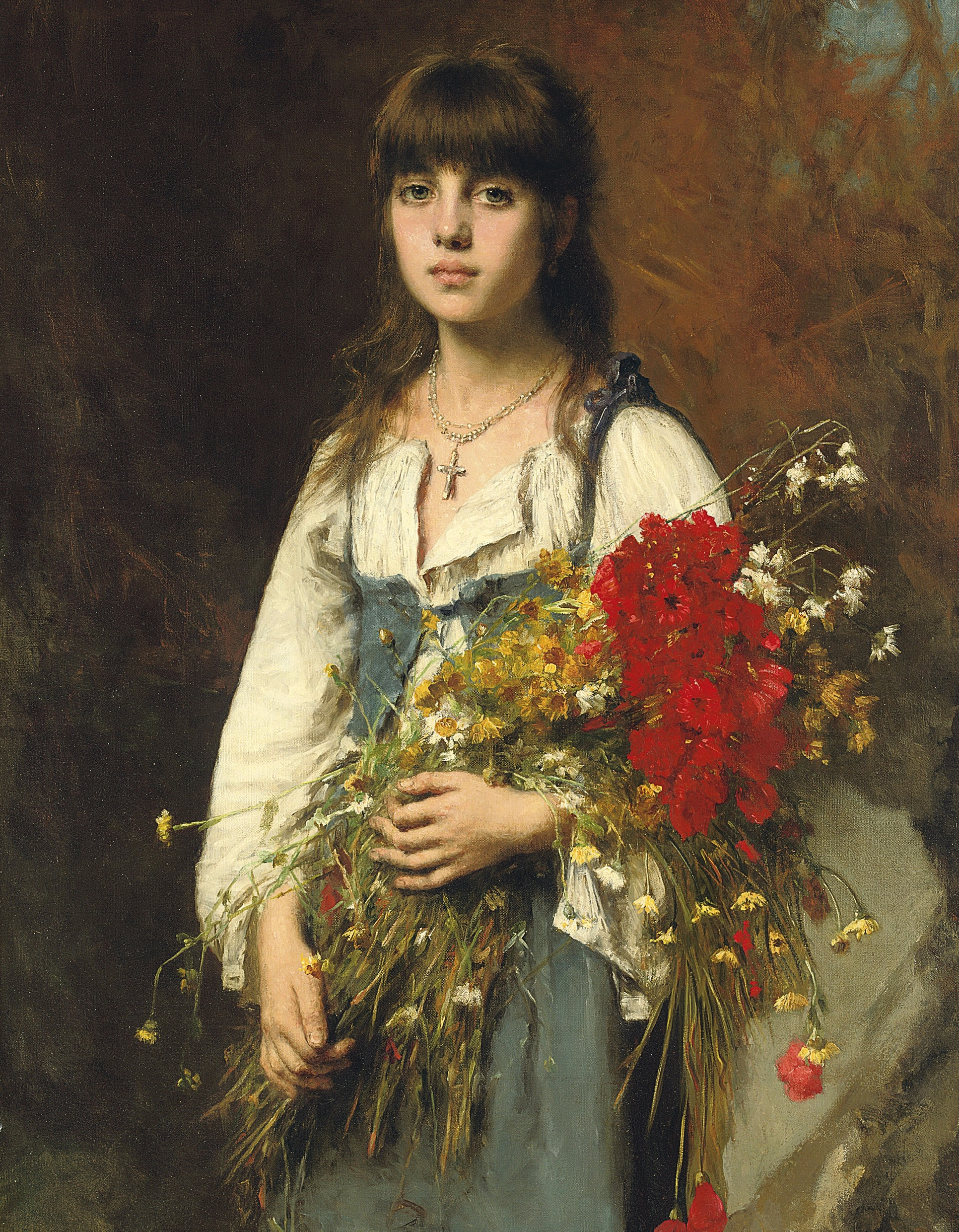
Summertime

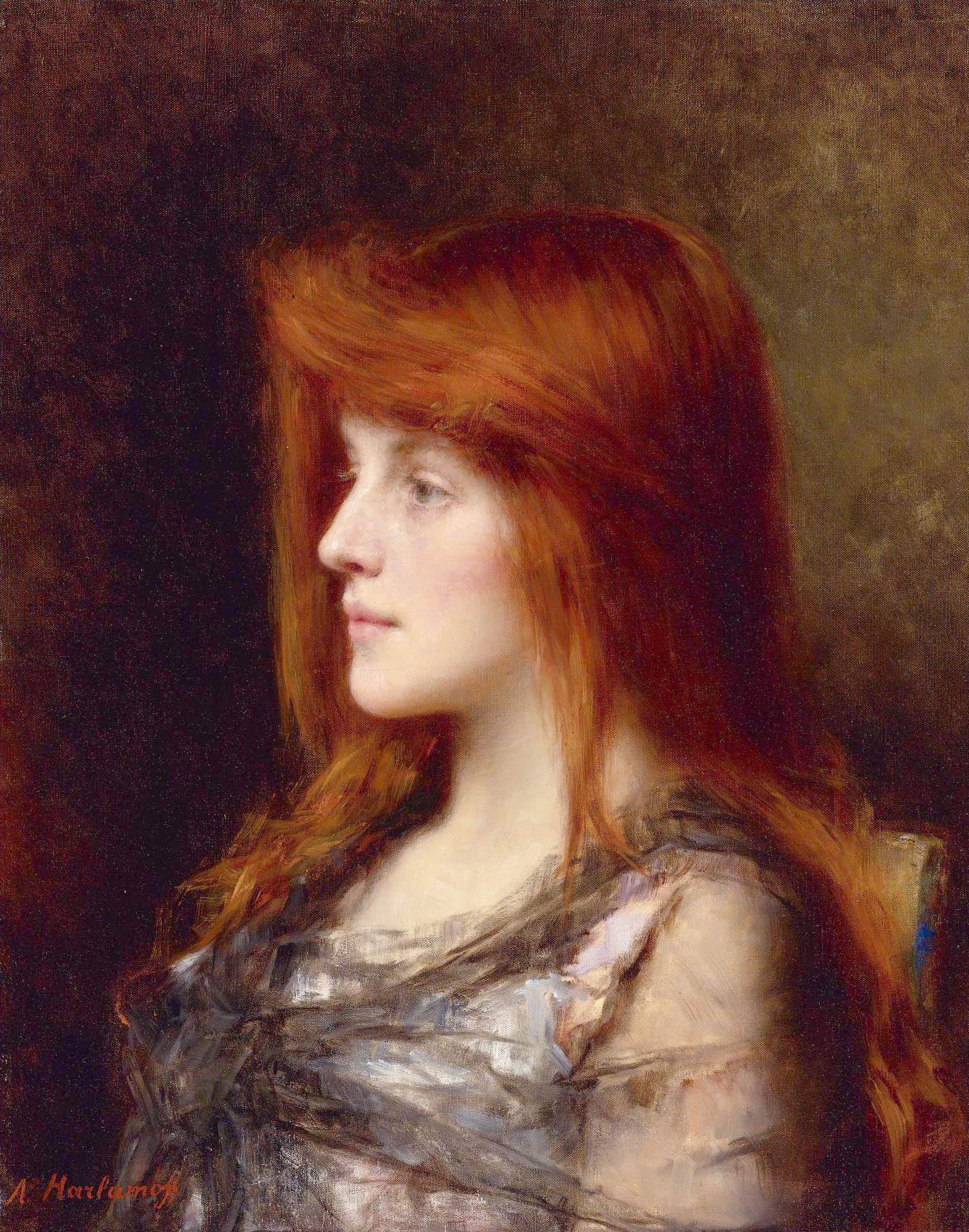
Young girl

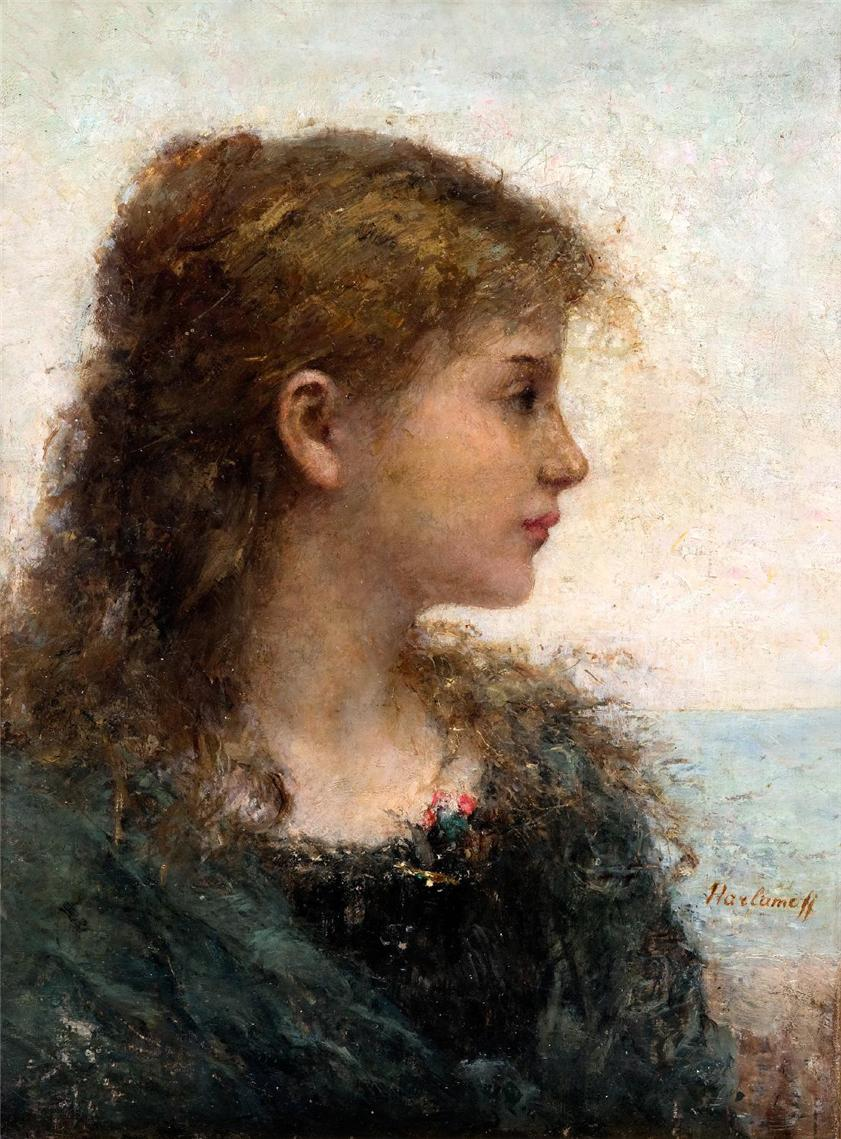
Portrait of a young woman

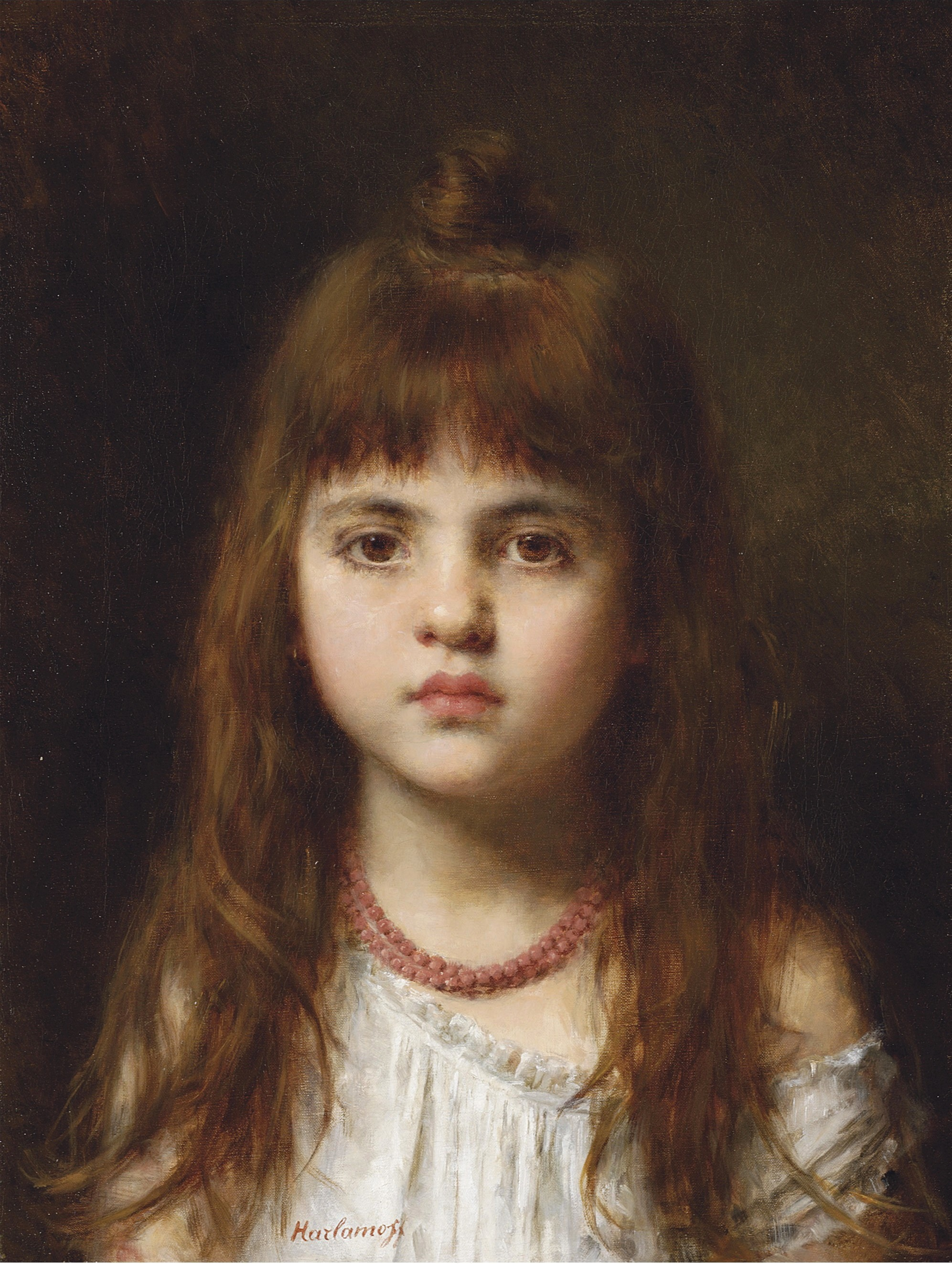
The Red Necklace

== Bibliography ==
- Lingenauber/Sugrobova-Roth (2007). Alexei Harlamoff. Düsseldorf: Edition Libertars. ISBN 978-3-00-021204-8.
- С. Н. Кондаков (1915). Юбилейный справочник Императорской Академии художеств. 1764-1914 (in Russian). Vol. 2. p. 210.
