= 1994 in Russia =

- Decades: 1970s; 1980s; 1990s; 2000s; 2010s
- See also: History of Russia; Timeline of Russian history; List of years in Russia

Events from the year 1994 in Russia.

== Incumbents ==
- President: Boris Yeltsin
- Prime Minister: Viktor Chernomyrdin
- Minister of Defence: Pavel Grachev

=== Governors ===
- Amur Oblast: Vladimir Polevanov (until December 2), Vladimir Dyachenko (starting December 2)
- Arkhangelsk Oblast: Pavel Balakshin
- Astrakhan Oblast: Anatoly Guzhvin
- Belgorod Oblast: Yevgeny Savchenko
- Bryansk Oblast: Vladimir Karpov
- Chelyabinsk Oblast: Vadim Solovyov
- Irkutsk Oblast: Yury Nozhikov
- Ivanovo Oblast: Adolf Laptev
- Kaliningrad Oblast: Yury Matochkin
- Kaluga Oblast: Aleksandr Deryagin
- Kemerovo Oblast: Mikhail Kislyuk
- Kirov Oblast: Vasily Desyatnikov
- Kostroma Oblast: Valery Arbuzov
- Kurgan Oblast: Anatoly Sobchak
- Kursk Oblast: Vasily Shuteyev
- Leningrad Oblast: Alexander Belyakov
- Lipetsk Oblast: Vladimir Zaytsev (Acting, until April 12), Mikhail Narolin (starting April 12)
- Magadan Oblast: Viktor Mikhailov
- Moscow Oblast: Anatoly Tyazhlov
- Murmansk Oblast: Yevgeny Komarov
- Nizhny Novgorod Oblast: Boris Nemtsov
- Novgorod Oblast: Mikhail Prusak
- Novosibirsk Oblast: Ivan Indinok
- Omsk Oblast: Leonid Polezhayev
- Orenburg Oblast: Vladimir Elagin
- Oryol Oblast: Yegor Stroyev
- Penza Oblast: Anatoly Kovlyagin
- Pskov Oblast: Vladislav Tumanov
- Rostov Oblast: Vladimir Chub
- Ryazan Oblast: Lev Bashmakov (until January 25), Gennady Merkulov (starting January 25)
- Sakhalin Oblast: Yevgeny Krasnoyarov
- Samara Oblast: Konstantin Titov
- Saratov Oblast: Yury Belykh
- Smolensk Oblast: Anatoly Glushenkov
- Tambov Oblast: Vladimir Babenko
- Tomsk Oblast: Viktor Kress
- Tula Oblast: Nikolai Sevryugin
- Tver Oblast: Vladimir Suslov
- Tyumen Oblast: Leonid Roketsky
- Ulyanovsk Oblast: Yuri Goryachev
- Vladimir Oblast: Yury Vlasov
- Volgograd Oblast: Ivan Shabunin
- Vologda Oblast: Nikolai Podgornov
- Voronezh Oblast: Aleksandr Kovalyov
- Yaroslavl Oblast: Anatoly Lisitsyn
- Jewish Autonomous Oblast: Nikolay Volkov

== Events ==
=== January ===
- January 3 — Baikal Airlines Flight 130 crashes, killing all 124 people on board.
- January 12–15 — United States – Russia mutual detargeting

=== March ===
- March 23 — Aeroflot Flight 593 crashes into the Kuznetsk Alatau mountain range in Southern Siberia, killing all 75 people on board.

=== September ===
- September 9 — The Eurasian Patent Convention is signed.

=== October ===
- October 17–20 — State visit by Elizabeth II to Russia

=== November ===
- November 26 — Battle of Grozny (November 1994)

=== December ===
- December 5 — The Budapest Memorandum on Security Assurances was signed in Budapest. It included security assurances against threats against the territorial integrity of Ukraine, Belarus and Kazakhstan.
- December 12 — Battle of Dolinskoye
- December 28 — Battle of Khankala

== Births ==
- March 5 - Daria Saville, tennis player
- September 1
  - Margarita Gasparyan, tennis player
  - Anna Smolina, tennis player
- September 30 — Aliya Mustafina, artistic gymnast

== Deaths ==
=== January ===
- January 2 — Viktor Aristov, film director and screenwriter (b. 1943)
- January 10 — Roman Tkachuk, theatre and film actor (b. 1932)
- January 17 — Yevgeny Ivanov, spy (b. 1926)
- January 20 — Vitālijs Rubenis, 8th Chairman of the Soviet of Nationalities (b. 1914)
- January 23
  - Nikolai Ogarkov, military officer (b. 1917)
  - Alexei Mozhaev, painter, graphic artist and art teacher (b. 1918)
- January 26 — Ales Adamovich, writer, critic and academic (b. 1927)
- January 27
  - Sergei Scherbakov, welterweight boxer (b. 1918)
  - Boris Vorontsov-Velyaminov, astrophysicist (b. 1904)
- January 29 — Yevgeny Leonov, actor (b. 1926)

=== February ===
- February 1 — Sergei Dubov, journalist, publisher and entrepreneur (b. 1943)
- February 3
  - Anatoly Alexandrov, physicist (b. 1903)
  - Georgy Shchedrovitsky, philosopher and methodologist (b. 1929)
- February 4 — Mikhail Linge, middle-distance runner and Olympic champion (b. 1958)
- February 10 — Augusts Voss, 3rd First Secretary of the Communist Party of Latvia (b. 1916)
- February 14 — Andrei Chikatilo, serial killer (b. 1936)
- February 17 — Aleksandr Chakovsky, editor and novelist (b. 1913)
- February 19
  - Fyodor Odinokov, actor (b. 1913)
  - Ivan Sidorenko, Red Army officer (b. 1919)
- February 20 — Vladimir Druzhnikov, actor (b. 1922)
- February 21 — Evgeny Belyaev, tenor (b. 1926)

=== March ===
- March 2 — Yevgeniya Zhigulenko, pilot and navigator (b. 1920)
- March 8 — Eufrosinia Kersnovskaya, memoirist and Gulag prisoner (b. 1908)
- March 23 — Valentina Vladimirova, actress (b. 1927)

=== April ===
- April 1 — Gennady Voronov, 15th Chairman of the Council of Ministers of the Russian SFSR (b. 1910)
- April 10 — Viktor Afanasyev, journalist and professor of philosophy (b. 1922)
- April 13 — Nikolai Kryuchkov, stage and film actor (b. 1911)
- April 16 — Victor Popov, theoretical physicist (b. 1937)
- April 19 — Taisia Afonina, painter and watercolorist (b. 1913)
- April 26 — Andrey Aizderdzis, politician (b. 1958)
- April 28 — Oleg Borisov, stage and film actor (b. 1929)

=== May ===
- May 3 — Vladimir Kostin, basketball referee (b. 1921)
- May 11 — Nikolay Fyodorov, animator, director, writer and cartoonist (b. 1914)
- May 13 — Vladimir Antoshin, chess Grandmaster (b. 1929)

=== June ===
- June 4 — Anatoli Vasiliev, realist painter (b. 1917)
- June 5 — Nikolay Dementyev, football striker and coach (b. 1915)
- June 7 — Anatoly Dorodnitsyn, mathematician (b. 1910)
- June 17
  - Boris Aleksandrov, composer (b. 1905)
  - Leonid Baykov, painter (b. 1919)
  - Yuri Nagibin, writer, screenwriter and novelist (b. 1920)
- June 22 — Ilya Frez, film director (b. 1909)
- June 24 — Vecheslav Zagonek, painter (b. 1919)
- June 25 — Matvey Shaposhnikov, military commander (b. 1906)

=== July ===
- July 7 — Anna Kostrova, realist painter, graphic artist and book illustrator (b. 1909)
- July 27 — Eduard Kolmanovsky, composer (b. 1923)

=== August ===
- August 1 — Valery Yardy, road cyclist (b. 1948)
- August 3 — Innokenty Smoktunovsky, stage and film actor (b. 1925)
- August 8 — Leonid Leonov, novelist and playwright (b. 1899)
- August 10 — Vladimir Melanin, biathlete (b. 1933)
- August 11 — Stanislav Chekan, actor (b. 1922)
- August 13 — Valentin Kuzin, ice hockey player (b. 1926)
- August 19 — Robert Rozhdestvensky, poet and songwriter (b. 1932)
- August 26 — Vladimir Burich, poet (b. 1932)

=== September ===
- September 10 — Yevgeny Dolmatovsky, poet and lyricist (b. 1915)
- September 12 — Boris Yegorov, physician and cosmonaut (b. 1937)
- September 17 — Vladimir Gershuni, dissident and poet (b. 1930)
- September 22 — Igor Chislenko, association football player (b. 1939)
- September 24 — Mark Prudkin, stage and film actor (b. 1898)

=== October ===
- October 7
  - Piotr Alberti, painter (b. 1913)
  - Maya Bulgakova, actress (b. 1932)
- October 9 — Nikolai Karetnikov, composer (b. 1930)
- October 14 — Nikolai Skomorokhov, flying ace (b. 1920)
- October 17 — Dmitry Kholodov, journalist (b. 1967)
- October 20 — Sergei Bondarchuk, actor, film director and screenwriter (b. 1920)
- October 24 — Alexander Shelepin, 2nd Chairman of the Committee for State Security (b. 1918)

=== November ===
- November 1 — Moisey Markov, physicist (b. 1908)
- November 5 — Albert Shesternyov, football player and manager (b. 1941)
- November 6 — Vladimir Zagorovsky, chess grandmaster (b. 1925)
- November 13 — Vladimir Ivashko, Acting General Secretary of the Communist Party of the Soviet Union (b. 1932)
- November 24 — Aleksandr Gusev, field hockey player (b. 1955)
- November 27 — Rufina Nifontova, stage and film actress (b. 1931)

=== December ===
- December 11 — Yuli Raizman, film director, screenwriter and pedagogue (b. 1903)
- December 13 — Olga Rubtsova, chess player (b. 1909)
- December 19
  - Vera Chaplina, children's literature writer and naturalist (b. 1908)
  - Vadim Kozin, tenor and songwriter (b. 1903)
- December 24 — Alexander Uvarov, ice hockey player (b. 1922)
- December 28 — Georgy Baydukov, test pilot, writer and hunter (b. 1907)
- December 30
  - Dimitri Ivanenko, theoretical physicist (b. 1904)
  - Andrei Kuznetsov, volleyball player (b. 1966)

=== Date unknown ===
- Gunsyn Tsydenova, 2nd Chairman of the Presidium of the Supreme Soviet of the Buryat-Mongol Autonomous Soviet Socialist Republic (b. 1909)
