= 1995 in Russia =

- Decades: 1970s; 1980s; 1990s; 2000s; 2010s
- See also: History of Russia; Timeline of Russian history; List of years in Russia

Events from the year 1995 in Russia.

== Incumbents ==
- President: Boris Yeltsin
- Prime Minister: Viktor Chernomyrdin
- Minister of Defence: Pavel Grachev

=== Governors ===
- Amur Oblast: Vladimir Dyachenko
- Arkhangelsk Oblast: Pavel Balakshin
- Astrakhan Oblast: Anatoly Guzhvin
- Belgorod Oblast: Yevgeny Savchenko
- Bryansk Oblast: Vladimir Barabanov
- Chelyabinsk Oblast: Vadim Solovyov
- Irkutsk Oblast: Yury Nozhikov
- Ivanovo Oblast: Adolf Laptev
- Kaliningrad Oblast: Yury Matochkin
- Kaluga Oblast: Aleksandr Deryagin
- Kemerovo Oblast: Mikhail Kislyuk
- Kirov Oblast: Vasily Desyatnikov
- Kostroma Oblast: Valery Arbuzov
- Kurgan Oblast: Anatoly Sobchak
- Kursk Oblast: Vasily Shuteyev
- Leningrad Oblast: Alexander Belyakov
- Lipetsk Oblast: Mikhail Narolin
- Magadan Oblast: Viktor Mikhailov
- Moscow Oblast: Anatoly Tyazhlov
- Murmansk Oblast: Yevgeny Komarov
- Nizhny Novgorod Oblast: Boris Nemtsov
- Novgorod Oblast: Mikhail Prusak
- Novosibirsk Oblast: Ivan Indinok (until December 30), Vitaly Mukha (starting December 30)
- Omsk Oblast: Leonid Polezhayev
- Orenburg Oblast: Vladimir Elagin
- Oryol Oblast: Yegor Stroyev
- Penza Oblast: Anatoly Kovlyagin
- Pskov Oblast: Vladislav Tumanov
- Rostov Oblast: Vladimir Chub
- Ryazan Oblast: Gennady Merkulov
- Sakhalin Oblast: Yevgeny Krasnoyarov (until April 24), Igor Farkhutdinov (starting April 24)
- Samara Oblast: Konstantin Titov
- Saratov Oblast: Yury Belykh
- Smolensk Oblast: Anatoly Glushenkov
- Sverdlovsk Oblast: Alexei Strakhov (until August 23), Eduard Rossel (Transformatsia Urala) (starting August 23)
- Tambov Oblast: Vladimir Babenko (until March 24), Oleg Betin (March 24–December), Aleksandr Ryabov (CPRF) (starting December)
- Tomsk Oblast: Viktor Kress
- Tula Oblast: Nikolai Sevryugin
- Tver Oblast: Vladimir Suslov (until December), Vladimir Platov (starting December)
- Tyumen Oblast: Leonid Roketsky
- Ulyanovsk Oblast: Yuri Goryachev
- Vladimir Oblast: Yury Vlasov
- Volgograd Oblast: Ivan Shabunin
- Vologda Oblast: Nikolai Podgornov
- Voronezh Oblast: Aleksandr Kovalyov
- Yaroslavl Oblast: Anatoly Lisitsyn
- Jewish Autonomous Oblast: Nikolay Volkov

== Events ==
=== January ===
- January 3 — 1995 Shali cluster bomb attack
- January 25 — Norwegian rocket incident

=== April ===
- April 7–8 — Samashki massacre

=== May ===
- May 12 — The political party Our Home – Russia is founded.
- May 27 — The 7.0 M_{w} Neftegorsk earthquake shakes northern Sakhalin Island in Russia with a maximum Mercalli intensity of IX (Violent), leaving 1,989 people dead and 750 injured.

=== June ===
- June 14–19 — Budyonnovsk hospital hostage crisis
- June 30 — A confidential agreement to end the sale of Russian conventional weapons to Iran by 1999 is signed by Chernomyrdin and Al Gore in Moscow

=== December ===
- December 17 — 1995 Russian legislative election

=== Undated ===
- Pallada Asset Management company is founded.

== Births ==
- February 16
  - Vladimir Fedoseev, chess grandmaster
  - Sergei Prokofyev, footballer
- May 12 — Irina Khromacheva, tennis player
- June 2 — Aleksandr Sumin, footballer
- October 27 — Vladislav Sergeyevich Ozerov, footballer
- November 29 — Valery Kolegov, snowboarder
- December 11 — Natalia Soboleva, snowboarder

== Deaths ==
=== January ===
- January 4
  - Valery Nosik, actor (b. 1940)
  - Nina Tikhonova, ballet dancer and teacher (b. 1910).
- January 7 — Ali Aliyev, freestyle wrestler (b. 1937)
- January 10 — Boris Gurevich, flyweight Greco-Roman wrestler (b. 1931)
- January 15 — Vitaly Parkhimovich, rifle shooter (b. 1943)

=== February ===
- February 4 — Elena Mikhailovskaya, first female champion in international draughts (b. 1949)
- February 14 — Ogdo Aksyonova, Dolgan poet and founder of Dolgan written literature (b. 1936)
- February 26 — Zenon Borevich, mathematician (b. 1922)

=== March ===
- March 1 — Vladislav Listyev, journalist (b. 1956)
- March 2 — Sasha Krasny, poet (b. 1882)
- March 17 — Vladimir Bunchikov, baritone (b. 1902)
- March 23
  - Nikolay Baskakov, ethnologist (b. 1905)
  - Vladimir Ivashov, actor (b. 1939)

=== April ===
- April 7 — Viktor Adamishin, militia captain (b. 1962)
- April 11 — Nikolai Kostrov, painter, graphic artist and illustrator (b. 1901)
- April 18 — Roza Makagonova, actress (b. 1927)
- April 23 — Viktor Getmanov, football player (b. 1940)
- April 24 — Iosif Kheifits, film director (b. 1905)

=== May ===
- May 1 — Mikhail Zimyanin, politician and diplomat (b. 1914)
- May 4 — Andrey Abramov, boxer (b. 1935)
- May 5 — Mikhail Botvinnik, chess player (b. 1911)
- May 7 — Maria Poliakova, colonel and spy (b. 1908)
- May 12 — Andrei Boltnev, actor (b. 1946)
- May 23 — Gavriil Kachalin, football player and coach (b. 1911)

=== June ===
- June 4 — Sergei Kapustin, ice hockey player (b. 1953)
- June 6 — Saveli Kramarov, actor (b. 1934)
- June 16 — Vladimir Aleksenko, Air Force general (b. 1923)
- June 22 — Leonid Derbenyov, poet (b. 1931)
- June 23 — Anatoli Tarasov, ice hockey player and coach (b. 1918)
- June 25 — Sergei Popov, marathon runner (b. 1930)
- June 30
  - Georgy Beregovoy, cosmonaut (b. 1921)
  - Gavriil Troyepolsky, writer (b. 1905)

=== July ===
- July 1 — Nikolai Peiko, composer and educator (b. 1916)
- July 2 — Maria Vinogradova, actress (b. 1922)
- July 5
  - Viktoria Brezhneva, spouse of former Soviet Leader Leonid Brezhnev (b. 1907)
  - Stepan Bakhayev, Air Force major and flying ace (b. 1922)
- July 20 — Natalia Shpiller, operatic soprano (b. 1909)
- July 21 — Viktor Barannikov, 10th Minister of Internal Affairs of the Soviet Union and 1st Minister of Security (b. 1940)
- July 30 — Nikolai Kuznetsov, aeronautical engineer (b. 1911)

=== August ===
- August 2 — Yury Koval, author, artist and screenplay writer (b. 1938)
- August 8 — Fedir Dyachenko, sniper during WWII (b. 1917)
- August 18 — Dmitri Shepilov, 5th Minister of Foreign Affairs of the Soviet Union (b. 1905)

=== September ===
- September 8 — Olga Ivinskaya, poet and writer (b. 1912)
- September 11 — Vladislav Strzhelchik, actor (b. 1921)
- September 20 — Mikhail Bogdanov, production designer (b. 1914)

=== October ===
- October 7 — Mikhail Butkevich, theatre director and professor of drama (b. 1926)
- October 21 — Anatoly Shelyukhin, cross-country skier and Olympian (b. 1930)

=== November ===
- November 12 — Roland Dobrushin, mathematician (b. 1929)
- November 20 — Sergei Grinkov, figure skater and Olympic gold medalist (b. 1967)
- November 22 — Sergey Stechkin, mathematician (b. 1920)
- November 25
  - Boris Rytsarev, film director (b. 1930)
  - Nikolai Drozdetsky, ice hockey player (b. 1957)

=== December ===
- December 2 — Alexander Kaidanovsky, actor and film director (b. 1946)
- December 6 — Dmitri Volkogonov, historian and colonel general (b. 1928)
- December 18 — Yelena Miroshina, diver (b. 1974)
- December 21 — Boris Ponomarev, statesman (b. 1905)
- December 27 — Boris Gnedenko, mathematician (b. 1912)
