= 1993 in Russia =

- Decades: 1970s; 1980s; 1990s; 2000s; 2010s
- See also: History of Russia; Timeline of Russian history; List of years in Russia

Events from the year 1993 in Russia.

== Incumbents ==
- President: Boris Yeltsin
- Vice President: Alexander Rutskoy (until 4 October)
- Prime Minister: Viktor Chernomyrdin
- Minister of Defence: Pavel Grachev
- Minister of Internal Affairs: Viktor Yerin
- Chairman of the Supreme Soviet of the Russian Federation: Ruslan Khasbulatov (until October 4)

=== Governors ===
- Amur Oblast: Albert Krivchenko (until April 8), Aleksandr Surat (April 8–October 5), Vladimir Polevanov (starting October 5)
- Arkhangelsk Oblast: Pavel Balakshin
- Astrakhan Oblast: Anatoly Guzhvin
- Belgorod Oblast: Viktor Berestovoy (until October 11), Yevgeny Savchenko (starting October 11)
- Bryansk Oblast: Vladimir Barabanov (until April 26), Yury Lodkin (CPRF) (April 26–September 25), Vladimir Karpov (starting September 25)
- Chelyabinsk Oblast: Vadim Solovyov
- Irkutsk Oblast: Yury Nozhikov
- Ivanovo Oblast: Adolf Laptev
- Kaliningrad Oblast: Yury Matochkin
- Kaluga Oblast: Aleksandr Deryagin
- Kemerovo Oblast: Mikhail Kislyuk
- Kirov Oblast: Vasily Desyatnikov
- Kostroma Oblast: Valery Arbuzov
- Kurgan Oblast: Valentin Gerasimov (until April 11), Anatoly Sobchak (starting April 11)
- Kursk Oblast: Vasily Shuteyev
- Leningrad Oblast: Alexander Belyakov
- Lipetsk Oblast: Gennady Kuptsov (until April 12), Vladimir Zaytsev (Acting, April 12–December 23)
- Magadan Oblast: Viktor Mikhailov
- Moscow Oblast: Anatoly Tyazhlov
- Murmansk Oblast: Yevgeny Komarov
- Nizhny Novgorod Oblast: Boris Nemtsov
- Novgorod Oblast: Mikhail Prusak
- Novosibirsk Oblast: Vitaly Mukha (until October 5), Ivan Indinok (starting October 5)
- Omsk Oblast: Leonid Polezhayev
- Orenburg Oblast: Vladimir Elagin
- Oryol Oblast: Nikolai Yudin (until April 13), Yegor Stroyev (starting April 13)
- Penza Oblast: Aleksandr Kondratyev (until April 11), Anatoly Kovlyagin (starting April 11)
- Pskov Oblast: Vladislav Tumanov
- Rostov Oblast: Vladimir Chub
- Ryazan Oblast: Lev Bashmakov
- Sakhalin Oblast: Valentin Fyodorov (until April 8), Yevgeny Krasnoyarov (starting April 8)
- Samara Oblast: Konstantin Titov
- Saratov Oblast: Yury Belykh
- Smolensk Oblast: Valery Fateyev (until April 25), Anatoly Glushenkov (starting April 25)
- Tambov Oblast: Vladimir Babenko
- Tomsk Oblast: Viktor Kress
- Tula Oblast: Nikolai Sevryugin
- Tver Oblast: Vladimir Suslov
- Tyumen Oblast: Yuri Shafranik (until January 12), Leonid Roketsky (starting January 12)
- Ulyanovsk Oblast: Yuri Goryachev
- Vladimir Oblast: Yury Vlasov
- Volgograd Oblast: Ivan Shabunin
- Vologda Oblast: Nikolai Podgornov
- Voronezh Oblast: Aleksandr Kovalyov
- Yaroslavl Oblast: Anatoly Lisitsyn
- Jewish Autonomous Oblast: Nikolay Volkov

== Events ==
=== January ===
- January 25 - The Russian space station Mir boasts the first art exhibition in outer space.

=== April ===
- April 25 - 1993 Russian government referendum

=== September ===
- September 21-October 4 - 1993 Russian constitutional crisis

=== October ===
- October-November - Yeltsin sends troops to seize Parliament from his opponents.

=== December ===
- December 12 - 1993 Russian constitutional referendum

== Births ==
- January 2 – Kirill Minov, ice dancer
- May 1 – Anastasia Belyakova, boxer

== Deaths ==
- January 24 — Sergei Zakharov, painter (b. 1900)
- January 28 — Anatoly Parfyonov, Greco-Roman wrestler (b. 1925)
- February 11 — Oksana Kostina, individual rhythmic gymnast (b. 1972)
- March 1 — Oleg Zaytsev, ice hockey denfenceman (b. 1939)
- March 6 — Valentina Borisenko, chess player (b. 1920)
- March 7 — Mariya Barabanova, stage and film actress (b. 1911)
- March 9 — Pavel Pavlenko, stage and film actor (b. 1902)
- March 10 — Vladimir Suteev, author (b. 1903)
- March 20 — Rachel Messerer, silent film actress (b. 1902)
- March 23 — Yevdokiya Nikulina, World War II bomber commander and Hero of the Soviet Union (b. 1917)
- March 25 — Mikhail Badyuk, World War II aviator (b. 1920)
- March 26 — Anatoli Yatskov, consul and intelligence officer during World War II (b. 1913)
- April 8 — Aleksei Saltykov, film director and screenwriter (b. 1934)
- April 11 — Vatslav Dvorzhetsky, film and theater actor (b. 1910)
- April 13
  - Grigori Abrikosov, theatre and film actor (b. 1932)
  - Andronik Iosifyan, aerospace engineer (b. 1905)
- April 16 — Aleksandr Kondratov, linguist, biologist, journalist and poet (b. 1937)
- April 17 — Nikolai Kryukov, film and theater actor (b. 1915)
- April 28 — Valentina Grizodubova, World War II aviator and Hero of the Soviet Union (b. 1909)
- May 2 — Ivan Lapikov, actor (b. 1922)
- May 5 — Yakov Belopolsky, architect (b. 1916)
- May 23 — Veniamin Dymshits, engineer and apparatchik (b. 1910)
- May 28 — Ivan Kovalev, military officer and statesman (b. 1901)
- June 4 — Georgy Millyar, actor (b. 1903)
- June 11 — Mikhail Chumakov, microbiologist and virologist (b. 1909)
- June 12 — Alexander Koroviakov, painter and art teacher (b. 1912)
- June 20 — Viktor Makhorin, handball player (b. 1948)
- June 25 — Sergey Gorshkov, lieutenant general (b. 1902)
- July 4 — Roman Kachanov, animator (b. 1921)
- July 15 — Yevgeny Fyodorov, Soviet Air Force major general (b. 1911)
- July 17
  - Vladimir Barmin, engineer and rocket scientist (b. 1909)
  - Adolf Yushkevich, historian of mathematics (b. 1906)
- July 24 — Viktor Pankrashkin, basketball player (b. 1957)
- July 26
  - Mikhail Kozell, painter (b. 1911)
  - Yuri Levitin, composer of classical music (b. 1912)
- July 31 — Gabdrakhman Kadyrov, speedway rider (b. 1941)
- August 20 — Viktor Torshin, sport shooter and Olympic medalist (b. 1948)
- August 24 — Boris Levin, mathematician (b. 1906)
- August 31 — Alexander Nekrich, historian (b. 1920)
- September 1 — Aleksey Vakhonin, weightlifter and Olympic champion (b. 1935)
- September 15 — Yulian Semyonov, writer, scriptwriter and poet (b. 1931)
- September 16 — Vera Orlova, actress (b. 1918)
- September 26 — Semyon Ivanov, general and Hero of the Soviet Union (b. 1907)
- September 27 — Andrey Soloviev, war photographer (b. 1953)
- October 6 — Sergei Babkov, painter (b. 1920)
- October 14 — Nikolay Baskakov, painter (b. 1918)
- November 3 — Leon Theremin, inventor (b. 1896)
- November 7
  - Nikolay Kostylev, weightlifter (b. 1938)
  - Andrey Tikhonov, mathematician and geophysicist (b. 1906)
- November 15 — Yelena Gogoleva, actress (b. 1900)
- November 19 — Leonid Gaidai, comedy film director (b. 1923)
- November 22 — Tatiana Nikolayeva, pianist and composer (b. 1924)
- November 29 — Peter Grushin, rocket scientist and academic (b. 1906)
- December 5 — Yevgeny Gabrilovich, writer, playwright and screenwriter (b. 1899)
- December 8 — Yevgeny Minayev, weightlifter (b. 1933)
- December 18 — Natalya Sats, stage director (b. 1903)
- December 21
  - Ivan Kozlovskyi, lyric tenor (b. 1900)
  - Margarita Nikolaeva, gymnast and Olympian (b. 1935)
- December 25 — Nikolai Timkov, painter (b. 1912)
- December 27 — Nina Lugovskaya, painter and theatre designer (b. 1918)
- December 29
  - Frunzik Mkrtchyan, Armenian stage and film actor (b. 1930)
  - Konstantin Rusakov, politician (b. 1909)
- December 31 — Mikhail Dudin, poet and writer (b. 1916)
