= 1992 in Russia =

- Decades: 1970s; 1980s; 1990s; 2000s; 2010s
- See also: History of Russia; Timeline of Russian history; List of years in Russia

Events from the year 1992 in Russia

== Incumbents ==
- President of Russia – Boris Yeltsin (Democratic Party of Russia)
- Vice President of Russia – Alexander Rutskoy (Patriots of Russia)
- Prime Minister of Russia –
  - until 15 June: Boris Yeltsin (Democratic Party of Russia)
  - 15 June–14 December: vacant
  - starting 14 December: Viktor Chernomyrdin (Our Home – Russia)

=== Governors ===
- Amur Oblast: Albert Krivchenko
- Arkhangelsk Oblast: Pavel Balakshin
- Astrakhan Oblast: Anatoly Guzhvin
- Belgorod Oblast: Viktor Berestovoy
- Bryansk Oblast: Vladimir Barabanov
- Chelyabinsk Oblast: Vadim Solovyov
- Irkutsk Oblast: Yury Nozhikov
- Ivanovo Oblast: Adolf Laptev
- Kaliningrad Oblast: Yury Matochkin
- Kaluga Oblast: Aleksandr Deryagin
- Kemerovo Oblast: Mikhail Kislyuk
- Kirov Oblast: Vasily Desyatnikov
- Kostroma Oblast: Valery Arbuzov
- Kurgan Oblast: Valentin Gerasimov
- Kursk Oblast: Vasily Shuteyev
- Leningrad Oblast: Alexander Belyakov
- Lipetsk Oblast: Gennady Kuptsov
- Magadan Oblast: Viktor Mikhailov
- Moscow Oblast: Anatoly Tyazhlov
- Murmansk Oblast: Yevgeny Komarov
- Nizhny Novgorod Oblast: Boris Nemtsov
- Novgorod Oblast: Mikhail Prusak
- Novosibirsk Oblast: Vitaly Mukha
- Omsk Oblast: Leonid Polezhayev
- Orenburg Oblast: Vladimir Elagin
- Oryol Oblast: Nikolai Yudin
- Penza Oblast: Aleksandr Kondratyev
- Pskov Oblast: Anatoly Dobryakov (until April 8), Vladislav Tumanov (starting April 8)
- Rostov Oblast: Vladimir Chub
- Ryazan Oblast: Lev Bashmakov
- Sakhalin Oblast: Valentin Fyodorov
- Samara Oblast: Konstantin Titov
- Saratov Oblast: Yury Belykh
- Smolensk Oblast: Valery Fateyev
- Tambov Oblast: Vladimir Babenko
- Tomsk Oblast: Viktor Kress
- Tula Oblast: Nikolai Sevryugin
- Tver Oblast: Vladimir Suslov
- Tyumen Oblast: Yuri Shafranik
- Ulyanovsk Oblast: Yuri Goryachev
- Vladimir Oblast: Yury Vlasov
- Volgograd Oblast: Ivan Shabunin
- Vologda Oblast: Nikolai Podgornov
- Voronezh Oblast: Viktor Kalasnikov (until March 18), Aleksandr Kovalyov (starting March 18)
- Yaroslavl Oblast: Anatoly Lisitsyn
- Jewish Autonomous Oblast: Nikolay Volkov

== Events ==
- January 2 - RTR channel began airing Santa Barbara, which would become the longest-running foreign TV series on Russian television (although only episodes from 217th to 2,040th were aired).

== Sport ==
- In 1992 Russian played American Football against the University of Central Florida (UCF). UCF won this game with a score of 43–6. The game took place at the Citrus Bowl with an attendance of 5,412 people in Orlando, Florida.

== Births ==
- January 1 — Daniil Apalkov, ice hockey player
- January 2 — Anna Arina Marenko, tennis player
- January 21 — Almaz Askarov, footballer
- January 31 — Alexandr Loginov, biathlete
- February 6 — Sean Babas, commercial, music video and motion picture film director
- March 8 — Vitaly Zdorovetskiy, online prankster
- April 1 — Alex Gilbert, New Zealand-based adoption advocate
- April 3 — Artur Amirov, ice hockey player
- April 12 — Denis Barantsev, ice hockey defenceman
- May 18 — Nina Petushkova, figure skater
- June 5 — Maksim Batov, footballer
- June 8 — Dmitri Avramenko, footballer
- June 19 — Dmitry Barkov, footballer
- July 3 — Alena Adanichkina, triathlete
- July 26 — Sergei Barbashev, ice hockey player
- August 3 — Denis Ablyazin, artistic gymnast
- August 16 — Islam Dzhabrailov, footballer
- September 29 — Marina Antipova, ice dancer
- October 20 — Ksenia Semenova, Olympic gymnast
- November 6 — Zakhar Arzamastsev, ice hockey player
- November 18 — Apti Aukhadov, weightlifter
- November 29 — Marina Antipova, ice dancer
- December 15 — Darya Dugina, journalist and political activist (d. 2022)
- December 31 — Artur Anisimov, footballer

== Deaths ==
=== January ===
- January 3 — Pavel Zyryanov, former commander of the Soviet Border Troops (b. 1907)
- January 6 — Nikolay Dutov, long-distance runner (b. 1938)
- January 8 — Zoya Voskresenskaya, diplomat and NKVD secret agent (b. 1907)
- January 21 — Marita Katusheva, volleyball player (b. 1938)
- January 27 — Boris Arapov, composer (b. 1905)

=== February ===
- February 10 — Vladimir Brovikov, politician (b. 1931)
- February 13 — Nikolai Bogolyubov, theoretical physicist (b. 1909)
- February 18 — Roman Filippov, actor (b. 1936)
- February 25 — Viktor Reznikov, singer-songwriter (b. 1952)

=== March ===
- March 4 — Yevgeniy Yevstigneyev, actor (b. 1926)
- March 7 — Asaf Messerer, ballet dancer (b. 1903)
- March 16 — Pyotr Shcherbakov, actor (b. 1929)

=== April ===
- April 1 — Konstantin Sergeyev, danseur (b. 1910)
- April 15 — Aleksandr Sevidov, football coach and player (b. 1921)
- April 17 — Arkady Chernyshev, ice hockey, soccer and bandy player (b. 1914)
- April 21 — Grand Duke Vladimir Kirillovich of Russia, Head of the House of Romanov (b. 1917)

=== May ===
- May 6 — Tatyana Yesenina, writer (b. 1918)
- May 8 — Sergey Obraztsov, puppeteer (b. 1901)
- 25 May
  - Viktor Grishin, 23th First Secretary of the Moscow City Committee of the Communist Party of the Soviet Union (b. 1914)
  - Ruben Zakharian, painter (b. 1901)

=== June ===
- June 1 — Anatoli Porkhunov, footballer (b. 1928)
- June 4 — Vladimir Chekalov, painter (b. 1922)
- June 7 — Alexander Koldunov, flying ace during WWII (b. 1923)
- 15 June – Lev Gumilyov, historian (b. 1912)

=== July ===
- July 4 — Lyudmila Tselikovskaya, actress (b. 1919)
- July 6 — Vsevolod Safonov, actor (b. 1926)
- July 8 — Nikolay Smirnov, admiral (b. 1917)
- July 16 — Tatyana Pelttser, actress (b. 1904)
- July 18 — Victor Louis, journalist (b. 1928)
- July 20 — Artem Kopot, ice hockey player (b. 1972)
- July 23 — Dmitry Maevsky, painter (b. 1917)
- July 24 — Gavriil Ilzarov, physician (b. 1921)
- July 29 — Dmitry Zubarev, theoretical physicist (b. 1917)

=== August ===
- August 1
  - Margarita Aliger, writer (b. 1915)
  - Aleksey Ryazanov, flying ace during WWII (b. 1920)
- August 8 — Ivan Anikeyev, cosmonaut (b. 1933)

=== September ===
- September 1 — Ivan Tregubov, ice hockey defenceman (b. 1930)
- September 13 — Arseny Semionov, painter and art teacher (b. 1911)
- September 21 — Aleksandr Almetov, ice hockey player (b. 1940)
- September 26 — Aleksandr Voronin, weightlifter (b. 1951)

=== October ===
- October 12 — David Dragunsky, army officer (b. 1910)

=== November ===
- November 6 — Lev Orekhov, painter (b. 1913)
- November 22 — Viktor Dubynin, army general (b. 1943)
- November 25
  - Mark Reizen, opera singer (b. 1895)
  - Dmitry Ukolov, ice hockey player (b. 1929)
- November 26 — Leopold Mitrofanov, chess composer (b. 1932)

=== December ===
- December 17 — Serafima Amosova, bomber commander during WWII (b. 1914)
- December 18 — Vladimir Semyonov, diplomat (b. 1911)
- December 19 — Vladimir Grebennikov, ice hockey player (b. 1932)
- December 23
  - Lona Cohen, American-born Soviet spy (b. 1913)
  - Vyacheslav Kurennoy, water polo player (b. 1932)
- December 26 — Nikita Magaloff, pianist (b. 1912)
