= 1996 in Russia =

- Decades: 1970s; 1980s; 1990s; 2000s; 2010s
- See also: History of Russia; Timeline of Russian history; List of years in Russia

Events from the year 1996 in Russia.

== Incumbents ==
- President: Boris Yeltsin
- Prime Minister: Viktor Chernomyrdin
- Minister of Defence: Pavel Grachev (until 17 July), Mikhail Kolesnikov (until 17 July), Igor Rodionov

=== Governors ===
- Amur Oblast: Vladimir Dyachenko (until May 17), Yury Lyashko (May 17–November 14), Anatoly Belonogov (CPRF) (starting November 14)
- Arkhangelsk Oblast: Pavel Balakshin (until March 4), Anatoly Yefremov (starting March 4)
- Astrakhan Oblast: Anatoly Guzhvin
- Belgorod Oblast: Yevgeny Savchenko
- Bryansk Oblast: Vladimir Karpov (until June 17), Alexander Semernyov (June 17–December 30), Yury Lodkin (CPRF) (starting December 30)
- Chelyabinsk Oblast: Vadim Solovyov (until December 22), Pyotr Sumin (PPUR) (starting December 22)
- Irkutsk Oblast: Yury Nozhikov
- Ivanovo Oblast: Adolf Laptev (until December 1), Vladislav Tikhomirov (starting December 1)
- Kaliningrad Oblast: Yury Matochkin (until October 20), Leonid Gorbenko (starting October 20)
- Kaluga Oblast: Aleksandr Deryagin (until November 9), Valery Sudarenkov (starting November 9)
- Kemerovo Oblast: Mikhail Kislyuk
- Kirov Oblast: Vasily Desyatnikov (until October 20), Vladimir Shaklein (starting October 20)
- Kostroma Oblast: Valery Arbuzov (until December 20), Viktor Shershunov (CPRF) (starting December 20)
- Kurgan Oblast: Anatoly Sobchak (until December 6), Oleg Bogomolov (starting December 6)
- Kursk Oblast: Vasily Shuteyev (until October 23), Alexander Rutskoy (Derzhava) (starting October 23)
- Leningrad Oblast: Alexander Belyakov (until November 18), Vadim Gustov (starting November 18)
- Lipetsk Oblast: Mikhail Narolin
- Magadan Oblast: Viktor Mikhailov (until November 15), Valentin Tsvetkov (starting November 15)
- Moscow Oblast: Anatoly Tyazhlov
- Murmansk Oblast: Yevgeny Komarov (until December 7), Yuri Yevdokimov (starting December 7)
- Nizhny Novgorod Oblast: Boris Nemtsov
- Novgorod Oblast: Mikhail Prusak
- Novosibirsk Oblast: Vitaly Mukha
- Omsk Oblast: Leonid Polezhayev
- Orenburg Oblast: Vladimir Elagin
- Oryol Oblast: Yegor Stroyev
- Penza Oblast: Anatoly Kovlyagin
- Pskov Oblast: Vladislav Tumanov (until November 10), Yevgeny Mikhailov (LDPR) (starting November 10)
- Rostov Oblast: Vladimir Chub
- Ryazan Oblast: Gennady Merkulov (until October 15), Igor Ivlev (October 15–the January 1997 handover)
- Sakhalin Oblast: Igor Farkhutdinov
- Samara Oblast: Konstantin Titov
- Saratov Oblast: Yury Belykh (until February 21), Dmitry Ayatskov (starting February 21)
- Smolensk Oblast: Anatoly Glushenkov
- Tambov Oblast: Aleksandr Ryabov (CPRF)
- Tomsk Oblast: Viktor Kress
- Tula Oblast: Nikolai Sevryugin
- Tver Oblast: Vladimir Platov
- Tyumen Oblast: Leonid Roketsky
- Ulyanovsk Oblast: Yuri Goryachev
- Vladimir Oblast: Yury Vlasov (until December 17), Nikolay Vinogradov (CPRF) (starting December 17)
- Volgograd Oblast: Ivan Shabunin (until December 29), Nikolai Maksyuta (CPRF) (starting December 29)
- Vologda Oblast: Nikolai Podgornov (until May 17), Vyacheslav Pozgalyov (starting May 17)
- Voronezh Oblast: Aleksandr Kovalyov (until September 16), Ivan Shabanov (starting September 16)
- Yaroslavl Oblast: Anatoly Lisitsyn
- Jewish Autonomous Oblast: Nikolay Volkov

== Events ==
=== January ===
- January 9–18 — Kizlyar-Pervomayskoye hostage crisis

=== April ===
- April 16 — Shatoy ambush

=== June ===
- June 16 — The first round of the 1996 Russian presidential election is held.

=== July ===
- July 3 — The second round of the 1996 Russian presidential election is held.

=== August ===
- August 6–20 — Battle of Grozny (August 1996)
- August 30 — The Khasavyurt Accord is signed.

=== November ===
- November 11 — Kotlyakovskoya Cemetery bombing

=== December ===
- December 24 — The Bion No.11 spacecraft is launched.

== Births ==
- February 11 — Daniil Medvedev, tennis player
- March 16 — Anna Ovcharova, Russian/Swiss figure skater
- March 19 — Feodosiy Efremenkov, figure skater
- April 2 — Polina Agafonova, figure skater
- April 12 — Elizaveta Kulichkova, tennis player
- April 14 — Tuyana Dashidorzhieva, archer
- May 22 — Aleksandr Ageyev, footballer
- November 23 — Lana, singer

== Deaths ==
=== January ===
- January 1 — Sergei Yakovlev, actor (b. 1925)
- January 12 — Joseph Kuzmin, 10th First Deputy Premier of the Soviet Union (b. 1910)
- January 25 — Yuri Levitansky, poet and translator (b. 1922)
- January 27
  - Vsevolod Sanayev, actor (b. 1912)
  - Vyacheslav Lemeshev, Olympic boxer (b. 1952)

=== February ===
- February 1 — Sergey Aganov, Marshal of Engineer Troops (b. 1917)
- February 7
  - Lydia Chukovskaya, writer, poet, editor, publicist and dissident (b. 1907)
  - Boris Tchaikovsky, composer (b. 1925)
- February 17 — Nikolai Starostin, footballer and ice hockey player (b. 1902)
- February 20 — Viktor Konovalenko, ice hockey goaltender (b. 1938)
- February 24 — Anna Larina, writer and third wife of Nikolai Bukharin (b. 1914)

=== March ===
- March 5 — Galina Kravchenko, actress (b. 1905)
- March 21 — Nikolai Usenko, Red Army soldier (b. 1924)
- March 29 — Ivan Kalita, equestrian (b. 1927)

=== April ===
- April 12 — Igor Ternov, theoretical physicist (b. 1921)
- April 21 — Dzhokhar Dudayev, Chechen politician (b. 1944)
- April 22 — Serafim Subbotin, flying ace (b. 1921)

=== May ===
- May 21 — Vladimir Belyakov, gymnast (b. 1918)
- May 23 — Kronid Lyubarsky, human rights activist (b. 1934)
- May 25 — Vladimir Ukhov, racewalking athlete (b. 1924)

=== June ===
- June 10 — Aleksandr Abushakhmetov, fencer (b. 1954)
- June 14 — Alexander Knyazhinsky, cinematographer (b. 1936)
- June 18 — Rif Saitgareev, speedway rider (b. 1960)
- June 29 — Dmitri Pokrovsky, musician (b. 1944)

=== July ===
- July 6 — Evgeni Rogov, football player and manager (b. 1929)
- July 9 — Sergey Kuryokhin, composer, pianist, music director, film actor and writer (b. 1954)
- July 16 — Iosif Prut, playwright and screenwriter (b. 1900)

=== August ===
- August 2
  - Aleksandr Nudelman, weapon designer and researcher (b. 1912)
  - Sergey Golovkin, serial killer and rapist (b. 1959)
- August 4 — Lev Lemke, actor (b. 1931)
- August 19 — Tatyana Mavrina, painter and children's writer (b. 1902)
- August 24
  - Zainab Biisheva, writer (b. 1908)
  - Lev Vlassenko, pianist and teacher (b. 1928)
- August 26 — Nikolai Baskakov, Turkologist (b. 1905)
- August 28 — Gevork Kotiantz, painter (b. 1909)
- August 29 — Kirill Yevstigneyev, fighter pilot (b. 1917)

=== September ===
- September 2 — Aleksandr Markin, football player (b. 1949)
- September 3
  - Veniamin Basner, composer (b. 1925)
  - Valeri Kravchenko, volleyball player (b. 1939)
- September 7 — Vyacheslav Solovyov, football player and coach (b. 1925)
- September 8 — Semyon Aranovich, film director (b. 1934)
- September 24 — Pavel Sudoplatov, lieutenant general and spy (b. 1907)
- September 28 — Andrei Suraikin, figure skater (b. 1948)

=== October ===
- October 6 — Vladimir Yerokhin, football player (b. 1930)
- October 12 — Nina Alisova, theater and film actress (b. 1915)
- October 18 — Simon Soloveychik, publicist, educator and social philosopher (b. 1930)
- October 20 — Yuri Neprintsev, painter, graphic artist and art teacher (b. 1909)

=== November ===
- November 3 — Paul Tatum, Russian-American businessman (b. 1955)
- November 4 — Konstantin Loktev, ice hockey player (b. 1933)
- November 6 — Vadim Ivanov, football player and coach (b. 1943)
- November 10 — Imam Alimsultanov, Chechen bard and folk singer (b. 1957)
- November 18 — Zinovy Gerdt, actor (b. 1916)
- November 24 — Edison Denisov, composer (b. 1929)

=== December ===
- December 18 — Yulii Khariton, physicist (b. 1904)
- December 29 — Vasily Mykhlik, pilot (b. 1922)
- December 30 — Lev Oshanin, poet, playwright and writer (b. 1912)
