= 1997 in Russia =

- Decades: 1970s; 1980s; 1990s; 2000s; 2010s
- See also: History of Russia; Timeline of Russian history; List of years in Russia

Events from the year 1997 in Russia.

== Incumbents ==
- President: Boris Yeltsin
- Prime Minister: Viktor Chernomyrdin
- Minister of Defence: Igor Rodionov (until May 22), Igor Sergeyev

=== Governors ===
- Amur Oblast: Anatoly Belonogov (CPRF)
- Arkhangelsk Oblast: Anatoly Yefremov
- Astrakhan Oblast: Anatoly Guzhvin
- Belgorod Oblast: Yevgeny Savchenko
- Bryansk Oblast: Yury Lodkin (CPRF)
- Chelyabinsk Oblast: Pyotr Sumin (PPUR)
- Irkutsk Oblast: Yury Nozhikov (until April 24), Boris Govorin (starting August 27)
- Ivanovo Oblast: Vladislav Tikhomirov
- Kaliningrad Oblast: Leonid Gorbenko
- Kaluga Oblast: Valery Sudarenkov
- Kemerovo Oblast: Mikhail Kislyuk (until July 1), Aman Tuleyev (starting July 1)
- Kirov Oblast: Vladimir Shaklein
- Kostroma Oblast: Viktor Shershunov (CPRF)
- Kurgan Oblast: Oleg Bogomolov
- Kursk Oblast: Alexander Rutskoy (Derzhava)
- Leningrad Oblast: Vadim Gustov
- Lipetsk Oblast: Mikhail Narolin
- Magadan Oblast: Valentin Tsvetkov
- Moscow Oblast: Anatoly Tyazhlov
- Murmansk Oblast: Yuri Yevdokimov
- Nizhny Novgorod Oblast: Boris Nemtsov (until March 17), Ivan Sklyarov (starting July 13)
- Novgorod Oblast: Mikhail Prusak
- Novosibirsk Oblast: Vitaly Mukha
- Omsk Oblast: Leonid Polezhayev
- Orenburg Oblast: Vladimir Elagin
- Oryol Oblast: Yegor Stroyev
- Penza Oblast: Anatoly Kovlyagin
- Pskov Oblast: Yevgeny Mikhailov (LDPR)
- Rostov Oblast: Vladimir Chub
- Ryazan Oblast: Igor Ivlev (until January 6), Vyacheslav Lyubimov (CPRF) (starting January 6)
- Sakhalin Oblast: Igor Farkhutdinov
- Samara Oblast: Konstantin Titov
- Saratov Oblast: Dmitry Ayatskov
- Smolensk Oblast: Anatoly Glushenkov
- Tambov Oblast: Aleksandr Ryabov (CPRF)
- Tomsk Oblast: Viktor Kress
- Tula Oblast: Nikolai Sevryugin (until April 17), Vasily Starodubtsev (CPRF) (starting April 17)
- Tver Oblast: Vladimir Platov
- Tyumen Oblast: Leonid Roketsky
- Ulyanovsk Oblast: Yuri Goryachev
- Vladimir Oblast: Nikolay Vinogradov (CPRF)
- Volgograd Oblast: Nikolai Maksyuta (CPRF)
- Vologda Oblast: Vyacheslav Pozgalyov
- Voronezh Oblast: Ivan Shabanov
- Yaroslavl Oblast: Anatoly Lisitsyn
- Jewish Autonomous Oblast: Nikolay Volkov

== Events ==
=== May ===
- May 8 — The 1997 Moscow memorandum is signed.
- May 12 — The Russia–Chechen Peace Treaty is signed.
- May 28 — The Partition Treaty on the Status and Conditions of the Black Sea Fleet is signed

=== September ===
- September 17 — Russia joins the Paris Club

=== December ===
- December 5 — 1997 Kamchatka earthquake
- December 6 — 1997 Irkutsk Antonov An-124 crash
- December 14 — Moscow City Duma election, 1997

== Births ==
=== January ===
- January 4 — Andrei Mironov, retired defensive midfielder who last played for the Latvian club BFC Daugavpils.
- January 13 — Ivan Provorov, ice hockey player for the Philadelphia Flyers
- January 14 — Tolmachevy Sisters, winners of Junior Eurovision Song Contest 2006
- January 31 — Anatoliy Ryapolov, long jumper

=== September ===
- September 30 — Yana Kudryavtseva, rhythmic gymnast

=== October ===
- October 20 — Andrey Rublev, tennis player

=== December ===
- December 20 — Lina Fedorova, pair skater

== Deaths ==
=== January ===
- January 10 — Valentin Koptyug, chemist (b. 1931)
- January 13 — Ruslan Stratonovich, physicist and engineer (b. 1930)
- January 19
  - Tamara Makarova, actress (b. 1907)
  - Vasily Nalimov, philosopher and humanist (b. 1910)
- January 23 — Lyudmila Marchenko, film actress (b. 1940)
- January 27 — Aleksandr Zarkhi, film director and screenwriter (b. 1908)

=== February ===
- February 3 — Mikhail Yakushin, football and field hockey player (b. 1910)
- February 4 — Alek Rapoport, nonconformist artist (b. 1933)
- February 7 — Daniil Shafran, cellist (b. 1923)
- February 8 — Michael Voslenski, writer, scientist, diplomat and dissident (b. 1920)
- February 19 — David Ashkenazi, pianist, accompanist and composer (b. 1915)
- February 25 — Andrei Sinyavsky, writer and dissident (b. 1925)

=== March ===
- March 23 — Pyotr Lushev, army general (b. 1923)
- March 29 — Aleksandr Ivanov, football player (b. 1928)

=== April ===
- April 3 — Sergei Filatov, equestrian (b. 1926)
- April 4 — Vladimir Soloukhin, poet and writer (b. 1924)
- April 7 — Georgy Shonin, cosmonaut (b. 1935)
- April 24 — Abdurakhman Avtorkhanov, Chechen historian and writer (b. 1908)
- April 25 — Nikolai Yegorov, politician (b. 1951)
- April 26 — Valery Obodzinsky, tenor (b. 1942)
- April 29 — Georgy Klimov, linguist (b. 1928)
- April 30 — Vladimir Sukharev, sprinter and Olympian (b. 1924)

=== May ===
- May 13 — Eduard Zakharov, boxer (b. 1975)
- May 17 — Mikhail Bychkov, ice hockey player (b. 1926)
- May 18 — Mikhail Anikushin, sculptor (b. 1917)
- May 28 — Tatyana Sumarokova, flight navigator during WWII (b. 1922)

=== June ===
- June 1 — Nikolai Tikhonov, 9th Premier of the Soviet Union (b. 1905)
- June 2
  - Nikolai Ozerov, tennis player and actor (b. 1922)
  - Zhenya Belousov, pop singer (b. 1964)
- June 7 — Nadezhda Simonyan, composer (b. 1922)
- June 9 — Yevgeni Lebedev, film and theater actor (b. 1917)
- June 12 — Bulat Okudzhava, poet, writer, musician and singer-songwriter (b. 1924)
- June 16 — Mariya Batrakova, Red Army officer and Hero of the Soviet Union (b. 1922)
- June 18 — Lev Kopelev, author and dissident (b. 1912)
- June 21 — Vladimir Vinogradov, diplomat (b. 1921)

=== July ===
- July 13 — Ekaterina Kalinchuk, gymnast and Olympic champion (b. 1922)
- July 18 — Igor Linchevski, botanist (b. 1908)
- July 25 — Boris Novikov, actor (b. 1925)

=== August ===
- August 10 — Valery Chaptynov, politician (b. 1945)
- August 13 — Vladimir Gribov, theoretical physicist (b. 1930)
- August 21 — Yuri Nikulin, clown, comedian, circus director and actor (b. 1921)
- August 23 — Elena Mayorova, actress (b. 1958)
- August 25 — Vitaly Tulenev, painter, visual artist and art teacher (b. 1937)

=== September ===
- September 11 — Anatoli Polosin, football coach (b. 1935)

=== October ===
- October 5 — Lirisa Rozanova, pilot and navigator during WWII (b. 1918)
- October 6
  - Yevgeny Khaldei, naval officer and photographer (b. 1917)
  - Georgi Yumatov, film actor (b. 1926)
- October 11 — Ivan Yarygin, heavyweight freestyle wrestler (b. 1948)
- October 22 — Leonid Amalrik, animator (b. 1905)

=== November ===
- November 3 — Vladimir Gulyaev, actor (b. 1924)
- November 15 — Vladimir Vengerov, film director (b. 1920)

=== December ===
- December 10 — Yevgeni Mayorov, ice hockey player (b. 1938)
- December 12 — Evgenii Landis, mathematician (b. 1921)
- December 19 — Fyodor Simashev, cross-country skier (b. 1945)
- December 21 — Igor Dmitriev, ice hockey player (b. 1941)
- December 26 — Sergei Mamchur, football defender (b. 1972)
- December 27 — Tamara Tyshkevich, shot putter and Olympian (b. 1931)
- December 28 — Vassily Solomin, boxer and Olympian (b. 1953)
