= 1998 in Russia =

- Decades: 1970s; 1980s; 1990s; 2000s; 2010s
- See also: History of Russia; Timeline of Russian history; List of years in Russia

Events from the year 1998 in Russia.

== Incumbents ==
- President: Boris Yeltsin
- Prime Minister:
  - until 23 March: Viktor Chernomyrdin
  - 23 March-24 April: vacant
  - 24 April-23 August: Yevgeny Primakov
  - 23 August-11 September: vacant
  - starting 11 September: Yevgeny Maximovich Primakov
- Minister of Defence: Igor Sergeyev

=== Governors ===
- Amur Oblast: Anatoly Belonogov (CPRF)
- Arkhangelsk Oblast: Anatoly Yefremov (Independent)
- Astrakhan Oblast: Anatoly Guzhvin (NDR)
- Belgorod Oblast: Yevgeny Savchenko (NDR)
- Bryansk Oblast: Yury Lodkin (CPRF)
- Chelyabinsk Oblast: Pyotr Sumin (PPUR)
- Irkutsk Oblast: Boris Govorin (Independent)
- Ivanovo Oblast: Vladislav Tikhomirov (Independent)
- Kaliningrad Oblast: Leonid Gorbenko (Independent)
- Kaluga Oblast: Valery Sudarenkov (Independent)
- Kemerovo Oblast: Aman Tuleyev (Independent / PPUR ally)
- Kirov Oblast: Vladimir Shaklein (Independent)
- Kostroma Oblast: Viktor Shershunov (CPRF)
- Kurgan Oblast: Oleg Bogomolov (Independent)
- Kursk Oblast: Alexander Rutskoy (Derzhava)
- Leningrad Oblast: Vadim Gustov (Independent, until September 21), Valery Serdyukov (Independent, starting September 21)
- Lipetsk Oblast: Mikhail Narolin (NDR, until April 12), Oleg Korolyov (Independent, starting April 12)
- Magadan Oblast: Valentin Tsvetkov (Independent)
- Moscow Oblast: Anatoly Tyazhlov (NDR)
- Murmansk Oblast: Yuri Yevdokimov (Independent)
- Nizhny Novgorod Oblast: Ivan Sklyarov (NDR)
- Novgorod Oblast: Mikhail Prusak (NDR)
- Novosibirsk Oblast: Vitaly Mukha (Independent)
- Omsk Oblast: Leonid Polezhayev (NDR)
- Orenburg Oblast: Vladimir Elagin (NDR)
- Oryol Oblast: Yegor Stroyev (Independent)
- Penza Oblast: Anatoly Kovlyagin (Independent, until April 12), Vasily Bochkarev (Independent, starting April 12)
- Pskov Oblast: Yevgeny Mikhailov (LDPR)
- Rostov Oblast: Vladimir Chub (NDR)
- Ryazan Oblast: Vyacheslav Lyubimov (CPRF)
- Sakhalin Oblast: Igor Farkhutdinov (Independent)
- Samara Oblast: Konstantin Titov (NDR)
- Saratov Oblast: Dmitry Ayatskov (Independent)
- Smolensk Oblast: Anatoly Glushenkov (Independent, until May 29), Aleksandr Prokhorov (CPRF, starting May 29)
- Tambov Oblast: Aleksandr Ryabov (CPRF)
- Tomsk Oblast: Viktor Kress (NDR)
- Tula Oblast: Vasily Starodubtsev (CPRF)
- Tver Oblast: Vladimir Platov (Independent)
- Tyumen Oblast: Leonid Roketsky (Independent)
- Ulyanovsk Oblast: Yuri Goryachev (Independent)
- Vladimir Oblast: Nikolay Vinogradov (CPRF)
- Volgograd Oblast: Nikolai Maksyuta (CPRF)
- Vologda Oblast: Vyacheslav Pozgalyov (Independent)
- Voronezh Oblast: Ivan Shabanov (Independent / CPRF ally)
- Yaroslavl Oblast: Anatoly Lisitsyn (NDR)
- Jewish Autonomous Oblast: Nikolay Volkov (Independent)

== Events ==
=== March ===
- 18 March - Kidnapping of Mormon missionaries in Saratov

=== August ===
- 17 August - 1998 Russian financial crisis

=== October ===
- 3 October - 1998 abduction of foreign engineers in Chechnya

== Births ==
- 29 January - Mikhail Lysov, professional football player
- 2 February - Anton Antonov, football player
- 17 February - Morgenshtern, rapper, singer, record producer, and songwriter
- 5 March - Vladislav Artemiev, chess player
- 12 March - Mikhail Maltsev, professional ice hockey forward
- 26 March - Georgi Makhatadze, football player
- 10 April - Anna Pogorilaya, figure skater
- 11 April - Vera Biryukova, group rhythmic gymnast
- 2 May - Vasilisa Davankova, ice dancer and pair skater
- 26 May - Aleksandra Semenova, rhythmic gymnast
- 1 June - Aleksandra Soldatova, rhythmic gymnast
- 5 June
  - Maxim Burov, freestyle skier
  - Yulia Lipnitskaya, figure skater
- 8 July - Daria Spiridonova, artistic gymnast
- 13 July - Ilya Konovalov, ice hockey goaltender
- 13 August
  - Dina Averina, rhythmic gymnast
  - Arina Averina, rhythmic gymnast
- 29 August - Daria Ustinova, backstroke swimmer
- 7 September - Ivan Ivanchenko, football player
- 29 October
  - Maria Kharenkova, artistic gymnast
  - Lada Akimova, model and Miss Earth 2017 – Fire
- 31 December - Alina Sanko, model and Miss Russia 2019

== Deaths ==
=== January ===
- January 2 — Sergei Frolov, realist painter and graphic artist (b. 1924)
- January 6 — Georgy Sviridov, composer (b. 1915)
- January 11 — Georgi Vins, baptist pastor (b. 1928)
- January 15
  - Gennady Kolbin, 11th First Secretary of the Communist Party of Kazakhstan (b. 1927)
  - Boris Tatushin, football player and manager (b. 1933)
- January 16 — Gayane Chebotaryan, composer and musicologist (b. 1918)
- January 19 — Larisa Tarkovskaya, film director and actress (b. 1933)

=== February ===
- February 4 — Yeranuhi Aslamazyan, graphic artist (b. 1910)
- February 28
  - Ivan Arkhipov, 17th First Deputy Premier of the Soviet Union (b. 1907)
  - Arkady Shevchenko, diplomat and defector (b. 1930)

=== March ===
- March 1 — Alexander Puzanov, 11th Chairman of the Council of Ministers of the Russian SFSR (b. 1906)
- March 15 — Gennady Yevryuzhikhin, football player (b. 1944)
- March 16 — Lydia Delectorskaya, model (b. 1910)
- March 21 — Galina Ulanova, ballet dancer (b. 1910)
- March 26 — Nikolay Dubinin, biologist and academician (b. 1907)

=== April ===
- April 7 — Vitaly Galkov, sprint canoer and Olympian (b. 1939)
- April 9 — Aleksey Spiridonov, athlete and Olympic medalist (b. 1951)
- April 19 — Vladimir Sokolov, scientist (b. 1928)

=== May ===
- May 6 — Aleksei Gritsai, artist (b. 1914)
- May 17 — Nina Dorliak, soprano and voice teacher (b. 1908)
- May 26
  - Emil Braginsky, screenwriter (b. 1921)
  - Sergey Yablonsky, mathematician (b. 1924)

=== June ===
- June 4 — Lev Rokhlin, former army officer and Yeltsin critic, murdered (b. 1947)
- June 8 — Larisa Yudina, opposition journalist (b. 1945)
- June 11 — Alexei Eriomin, realist painter (b. 1919)
- June 26 — Vladimir Petukhov, politician (b. 1949)
- June 30 — Galina Brezhneva, socialite and daughter of former Soviet leader Leonid Brezhnev (b. 1929)

=== July ===
- July 3 — Lev Rokhlin, army officer (b. 1947)
- July 12 — Arkady Ostashev, mechanical engineer (b. 1925)
- July 23 — Vladimir Dudintsev, writer (b. 1918)

=== August ===
- August 4 — Yuri Artyukhin, cosmonaut and engineer (b. 1930)
- August 5 — Yevgeny Shabayev, artist gymnast (b. 1973)
- August 11 — Sergei Vonsovsky, physicist (b. 1910)
- August 19
  - Vasily Arkhipov, naval officer (b. 1926)
  - Yuri Yappa, theoretical physicist (b. 1927)
  - Boris Kadomtsev, plasma physicist (b. 1928)
- August 20
  - Ivan Godlevsky, painter (b. 1908)
  - Oleg Prokofiev, artist, sculptor and poet (b. 1928)
- August 23 — Nikolai Kolesov, footballer (b. 1956)
- August 24 — Alexey Anselm, physicist (b. 1934)
- August 25 — Vyacheslav Kochemasov, diplomat and politician (b. 1918)
- August 28 — Nikolai Zateyev, submariner (b. 1926)

=== September ===
- September 7 — Valeri Frid, screenwriter (b. 1922)
- September 18 — Vadim Rogovin, Trotskyist historian and sociologist (b. 1937)
- September 21 — Vladimir Pokhilko, entrepreneur (b. 1954)
- September 24 — Genrikh Altshuller, engineer, inventor and writer (b. 1926)

=== October ===
- October 6 — Rolan Bykov, actor, theatre and film director and screenwriter (b. 1929)
- October 10 — Konstantin Petrzhak, nuclear physicist (b. 1907)
- October 13 — Dmitry Filippov, politician and industrialist (b. 1944)
- October 21 — Tatyana Tolmachova, figure skater (b. 1907)
- October 24 — Ardalion Ignatyev, track and field athlete and Olympic medalist (b. 1930)
- October 25 — Gavriil Malysh, painter, watercolorist and graphic artist (b. 1907)

=== November ===
- November 1 — Stanislav Zhuk, skater and coach (b. 1935)
- November 7 — Vladimir Matskevich, apparatchik and ambassador (b. 1909)
- November 16 — Alexander Smorchkov, fighter pilot during WWII (b. 1919)
- November 17 — Efim Geller, chess player (b. 1925)
- November 20 — Galina Starovoytova, dissident (b. 1946)
- November 22 — Vladimir Demikhov, scientist and organ transplantation pioneer (b. 1916)
- November 27 — Andrey Sergeev, writer and translator (b. 1933)

=== December ===
- December 3 — Albert Leman, composer (b. 1915)
- December 12 — Vadim Gulyaev, water polo player and Olympic champion (b. 1941)
- December 17 — Antonina Khudyakova, air force officer during WWII (b. 1917)
- December 18 — Lev Dyomin, cosmonaut (b. 1926)
- December 23 — Anatoly Rybakov, writer (b. 1911)
