= 1943 in the Soviet Union =

- Decades: 1920s; 1930s; 1940s; 1950s; 1960s
- See also: History of the Soviet Union; List of years in the Soviet Union

The following lists events that happened during 1943 in the Union of Soviet Socialist Republics.

== Incumbents ==
- General Secretary of the Communist Party of the Soviet Union — Joseph Stalin
- Chairman of the Presidium of the Supreme Soviet of the Soviet Union — Mikhail Kalinin
- Chairman of the Council of People's Commissars of the Soviet Union — Joseph Stalin

== Events ==
=== January ===
- January 15–25 — World War II: Battle of Voronezh (1943)

=== February ===
- February 2 — The Battle of Stalingrad officially ends with General Karl Strecker's surrender to Soviet forces.
- February 10–13 — World War II: Battle of Krasny Bor

=== July ===
- July 12 — World War II: Battle of Prokhorovka, part of the Battle of Kursk

=== August ===
- Battle of Kursk

=== October ===
- October 30 — World War II: The Moscow Declaration is signed by the United States, the United Kingdom and the Soviet Union during the Moscow Conference.

=== November ===
- November 6 — The 26th Anniversary of the October Revolution Celebration Meeting

== Births ==
- January 14 — Mariss Jansons, Latvian conductor (d. 2019)
- January 18 — Vladimir Fedotov, Soviet and Russian football striker (d. 2009)
- February 1 — Viktor Dubynin, 1st Chief of the General Staff of the Russian Armed Forces (d. 1992)
- February 4 — Sergei Dubov, Russian journalist, publisher and entrepreneur (d. 1994)
- February 18 — Valery Zorkin, 1st and 4th President of the Constitutional Court of Russia
- February 21 — Lyudmila Ulitskaya, Russian novelist
- February 22 — Eduard Limonov, Russian writer, poet, publicist and political dissident (d. 2020)
- February 26 — Kazimira Prunskiene, 1st Prime Minister of Lithuania
- May 4 — Mihail Chemiakin, Russian-American painter, stage designer, sculptor and publisher
- May 6 — Lidziya Bryzha, Belarusian milkmaid and machine milking operator (d. 2014)
- May 17
  - Alexander Lenkov, Soviet and Russian film, stage and voice actor (d. 2014)
  - Valentina Kamenyok-Vinogradova, volleyball player (d. 2002)
- May 29 — Ion Ciubuc, 3rd Prime Minister of Moldova (d. 2018)
- June 9 — Viktor Aristov, film director and screenwriter (d. 1994)
- June 11 — Oleg Vidov, Russian-American actor (d. 2017)
- June 17 — Vitaly Parkhimovich, rifle shooter (d. 1995)
- June 30 — Viktor Chistiakov, actor and parodist (d. 1972)
- July 6 — Tamara Sinyavskaya, Russian mezzo-soprano
- July 17 — Vadim Ivanov, Soviet and Russian football player and coach (d. 1996)
- August 10 — Yuri Khaliullin, Soviet and Russian naval officer (d. 2022)
- August 14 — Vyacheslav Lebedev, 1st Chief Justice of the Russian Federation (d. 2024)
- August 31 — Leonid Ivashov, Russian military and public official
- October 5 — Inna Churikova, Soviet and Russian stage and film actress (d. 2023)
- October 10 – Galina Skakun, Belarusian cattle breeder and milkmaid (d. 2022)
- November 7
  - Nasirdin Isanov, 1st Prime Minister of Kyrgyzstan (d. 1991)
  - Boris Gromov, 2nd Governor of Moscow Oblast
- December 20 — Otto Barch, Kyrgyz Olympic racewalker

== Deaths ==
- January 3 — Yusif Vazir Chamanzaminli, Azerbaijani statesman (b. 1887)
- January 4 — Marina Raskova, navigator (b. 1912)
- January 26 — Nikolai Vavilov, botanist and geneticist (b. 1887)
- January 29 — Vladimir Kokovtsov, 4th Prime Minister of Russia (b. 1853)
- February 9 — Dmitry Kardovsky, painter and illustrator (b. 1866)
- February 23 — Grigory Kravchenko, test pilot and air force general (b. 1912)
- March 11 — Leonid Khrushchev, fighter pilot and son of Nikita Khrushchev (b. 1917)
- March 31 — Pavel Milyukov, historian and liberal politician (b. 1859)
- April 14 — Yakov Dzhugashvili, eldest son of Joseph Stalin (b. 1907)
- April 25 — Vladimir Nemirovich-Danchenko, theatre director, writer, pedagogue, playwright, producer and theatre administrator (b. 1858)
- May 2 — Konstantin Pamfilov, statesman (b. 1901)
- May 19 — Kristjan Raud, painter and drawer (b. 1865)
- May 24 — Johannes Orasmaa, Estonian general (b. 1890)
- July 14 — Mariya Borovichenko, medical officer (b. 1925)
- August 5 — Iosif Apanasenko, commander (b. 1890)
- November 5 — Samad Abdullayev, army officer (b. 1920)
- November 28 — Aleksander Hellat, Estonian politician (b. 1881)
- December 4 — Yemelyan Yaroslavsky, revolutionary, functionary, journalist and historian (b. 1878)

== See also ==
- 1943 in fine arts of the Soviet Union
- List of Soviet films of 1943
