= Pallada Asset Management =

- Type: Closed Joint Stock Company
- Industry: assets management
- Founded: 1995
- Headquarters: Moscow
- Key people: Ivan Yurjevich Rudenko (general director)
- Website: http://www.pallada.ru

CJSC "Pallada Asset Management" is the oldest Russian management company specializing in asset management. Russian and foreign citizens, pension funds, insurance companies, investment funds as well as other organizations entrust the company the management of their money. The company head office locates in Moscow. It is a part of Investment Group Russian Funds.

== History ==
CJSC “Pallada Asset Management” was one of the first in Russia who has registered unit trust “Pallada – state securities fund” in 1996 (that became OEIF “Pallada – bonds” since 2006). The company manages pension funds of Russian Federation pension fund since year 2003. In 2010, CJSC “Pallada Asset Management” acquired in management the unit trusts formerly managed by management company “RBusiness” previously known as management company of Rosbank. (OEIFMI “Granat”, OEIFB “Sapfir”, OIF “Izumrud – index MICEX”, OEIFMI “Topaz”, IMFS “Almaz” and IUIBF “Ametist”), as well as unit trust formerly managed by “Management company Alemar” Ltd (OEIF “Alemar – stock fund”, OEIF “Alemar – bond fund”, OEIFMI “Alemar – active operations”).

== Management ==
General director – Ivan Yurjevich Rudenko. He is employed by a “Russian Funds” company since 2003. He took such posts analyst, trader, deputy chief of financing in the attraction department, head of the bank investing department of Russian Funds Investment Group. Except of general management he is the chairman of the Investment Committee and controls the final decisions about general asset management strategy.
