= 1997 Kamchatka earthquake =

Earthquake on the Kamchatka Peninsula, Russia

- Location within Kamchatka Krai
- UTC time: 1997-12-05 11:26:53
- ISC event: 1056468
- USGS-ANSS: ComCat
- Local date: December 5, 1997
- Local time: 23:26:53 PETT
- Magnitude: M_{w} 7.7
- Depth: 33 km (21 mi)
- Epicenter: 54.841°N 162.035°E
- Max. intensity: MMI VII (Very strong)

The 1997 Kamchatka earthquake, or 1997 Kronotsky earthquake, occurred on December 5 at 11:26 UTC near the east coast of the Kamchatka Peninsula. It was an M_{w} 7.7 (7.6–7.8) earthquake and was felt with intensity MM V in Petropavlovsk-Kamchatskiy. A 60 cm (23.6 in) tsunami was recorded in Kahului, 47 cm (18.5 in.) in Hilo, and 15 cm (6 in.) in Unalaska. The local tsunami generated by this earthquake affected a mostly unpopulated region. A post-tsunami survey found runup (height above normal sea level) on the Kronotsky Peninsula was no more than a few meters. However, a later geological survey north of the peninsula, as well as an interview with a park ranger, indicate that runup was up to 8 meters (26 ft) along the coast near the Little and Big Chazhma rivers and north to the Storozh River.

Deformation during and after this earthquake was measured by GPS. There were significant foreshocks, and also an apparently independent rupture along the southern border of the primary rupture.
