= Mikhail Butkevich =

Russian theater director and drama teacher (1926–1995)

Mikhail Mikhailovich Butkevich (Russian: Михаил Михайлович Буткевич; 10 December 1926 – 7 October 1995) was a Soviet theatre director and professor of drama at the Russian Academy of Theatre Arts (GITIS).

Born in Derbent, Butkevich spent the first decade of his life in Prokhladny, North Caucasus. His mother, Maria Rafailovna Butkevich, was born into an aristocratic Russian family. In 1937, his parents were arrested as part of the Great Purge; Mikhail was sent to an orphanage and then a "colony" where the "children of the enemies of the people would be re-educated." He was drafted into the Russian Army in 1945 and left four years later.

After Stalin's death in 1953, Butkevich sent an official inquiry into the fate of his parents. Six months later, Butkevich, who was living Tashkent, was summoned to the NKVD headquarters in the city, where he was informed his mother and father were both shot in 1937, and he was "informally advised" to leave Tashkent. He then moved to Moscow to study at GITIS, studying under Maria Knebel and Alexei Popov.

He became the teacher of many award-winning contemporary Russian directors and actors and an author of a recently published book on the methodology of theatre education titled Towards the Theatre of Play. As a theorist of theatrical production, Butkevich advocated respect for the author, clear identification of the central conflict, nuanced interpretation of the author's intentions, while striving for a new, fresh imagining of the work.
