= Alexei Strakhov =

- Born: October 16, 1975 (age 50) Kharkiv, Ukrainian SSR
- Height: 5 ft 9 in (175 cm)
- Weight: 174 lb (79 kg; 12 st 6 lb)
- Position: Right wing
- KHL team: HC Dinamo Minsk
- National team: Belarus
- Playing career: 1995–present

Oleksiy "Alexei" Strakhov (born October 16, 1975) is an ice hockey player from Kharkiv, Ukraine, currently playing for HC Dinamo Minsk of the Kontinental Hockey League (KHL), and for the Belarusian national team.
