= I. D. Serebryakov =

Soviet lexicographer and translator

Igor Dmitrievich Serebryakov (Игорь Дмитриевич Серебряков; 27 November 1917 – 1998) was a Soviet lexicographer and translator. He along with Igor Rabinovich made the first Punjabi-Russian Dictionary.

== Books ==
- Sketches of Ancient Indian Literature
- Punjabi Literature : A Brief Outline
