= Stepan Bakhayev =

Soviet flying ace (1922–1995)

Stepan Antonovich Bakhayev
- Степан Антонович Бахаев
- Born: 2 February 1922; Dvurechki village, Tambov Governorate, RSFSR (located within present-day Gryazinsky District)
- Died: 5 July 1995 (aged 73); Bohodukhiv, Ukraine
- Military career
- Allegiance: Soviet Union
- Branch: Soviet Air Force
- Service years: 1941–1959
- Rank: Major
- Conflicts: World War II; Korean War
- Awards: Hero of the Soviet Union

Stepan Antonovich Bakhayev (Russian: Степа́н Анто́нович Баха́ев; 2 February 1922 – 5 July 1995) was a Soviet Air Force major, flying ace and Hero of the Soviet Union. Credited with 13 shootdowns during World War II, he went on to fly during the Korean War and was subsequently credited with shooting down 11 American planes during the conflict, although many of the aircraft he was credited with shooting down were able to return to base after sustaining the damage he inflicted.

== Early life ==
Bakhayev was born on 2 February 1922 to a Russian peasant family in the village of Dvurechki, part of the present-day Gryazinsky District. He completed his secondary education in Lipetsk, after which he completed trade school in 1940. He then worked at a metallurgical while training at an aeroclub before he entered the military. After graduating from the Krasnodar Higher Military Aviation School in March 1943 he was assigned to the 6th Reserve Aviation Regiment. In April he was reassigned to the 515th Fighter Aviation Regiment, but was not deployed to the warfront until August. During the war he gained an estimated 12 solo and three shared aerial victories throughout the course of 112 sorties. After the war he remained in the military, and in 1947 he was assigned to the 523rd Fighter Regiment. He quickly learned to fly MiG jets which were used in the Korean war.

== Korean War ==
In March 1951 the 303rd Fighter Aviation Division, which included the 523rd Regiment, was sent to China. Their airfields were still under construction, but in late May they were relocated to an airfield roughly a dozen kilometers from the Yalu River. The regiment was equipped with 30 MiG-15s and was assigned to engaging enemy aircraft that went north of the 38th parallel, and first engaged in air-to-air combat on 18 June; however, Bakhayev was not involved in that incident. Five days later he engaged American pilots, but he did not score an aerial victory that day. The next day he hit an F-80, probably that of Talmadge Wilson, who was wounded but returned to base where his aircraft was written off; however, it was not the first time he shot down an American plane; in December 1950 he had shot down a RB-29 that violated Soviet airspace over the Primorsky Krai before his deployment to Korea. It was not until September that he scored his next aerial victories, but from then on he quickly increased his tally, hitting F-80, F-84, F-86, and B-29 aircraft. On 23 October, colloquially known as "black tuesday" he badly damaged a B-29 (No. 44-27347), which made an emergency landing in Kimpo where it was written off, since the fire Bakhaev caused completely destroyed the aircraft. Due to the high casualty ratio of the B-29 mission, American forces switched to only flying such missions at night. One of Bakhayev's notable victories was the attack on F-86A No.49-1318 in early January 1952, which he shot down; the aircraft had previously been flown by James Jabara, credited as the first jet ace, but Jabara was not in Korea at the time and the plane was later put back into service.

Bakhayev was both praised and criticized by his colleagues for his flight techniques. Lieutenant Georgy Dyachenko claimed that errors made by Bakhayev resulted him (Dyachenko) and Konstantin Shalanov being shot down. However, Nikolai Kovalenko described during a postwar interview an incident when Bakhayev saved him from attacking fighters.

A vast majority of sources, both Western and Russian, credit him with eleven solo aerial victories in the war; however, such tallies include aircraft that were written off after making emergency landings on friendly territory.

== Postwar ==
After the war he remained in the 523rd Regiment as a squadron commander. Based in the Russian Far East, he learned to pilot the MiG-17. In 1955 he was transferred to the 30th Aviation Division as a flight instructor, but in late 1958 he became the assistant commander for fire and tactical training of the 18th Guards Fighter Regiment, but was forced to retire from the military in October 1959 with the rank of major due to his poor health; just a few months earlier on 26 April 1959 he suffered a spinal cord injury after being forced to eject from a plane about to crash. As a civilian he moved to Kharkhiv with his family, where he worked for the DOSAAF from 1962 to 1973. Having suffered a stroke in 1980 and a second one in 1982, he died at the age of 73 in Bohodukhiv.

== Awards ==
- Hero of the Soviet Union (13 November 1951)
- Order of Lenin (13 November 1951)
- Four Order of the Red Banner (22 August 1944, 15 June 1945, 10 October 1951, 23 January 1957)
- Two Order of the Patriotic War 1st class (23 November 1943 and 11 March 1985)
- Order of the Patriotic War 2nd class (5 February 1945)
- Two Order of the Red Star (22 February 1955 and 20 December 1956)
- Medal "For Battle Merit" (17 May 1951)
