= Alena Adanichkina =

Russian triathlete

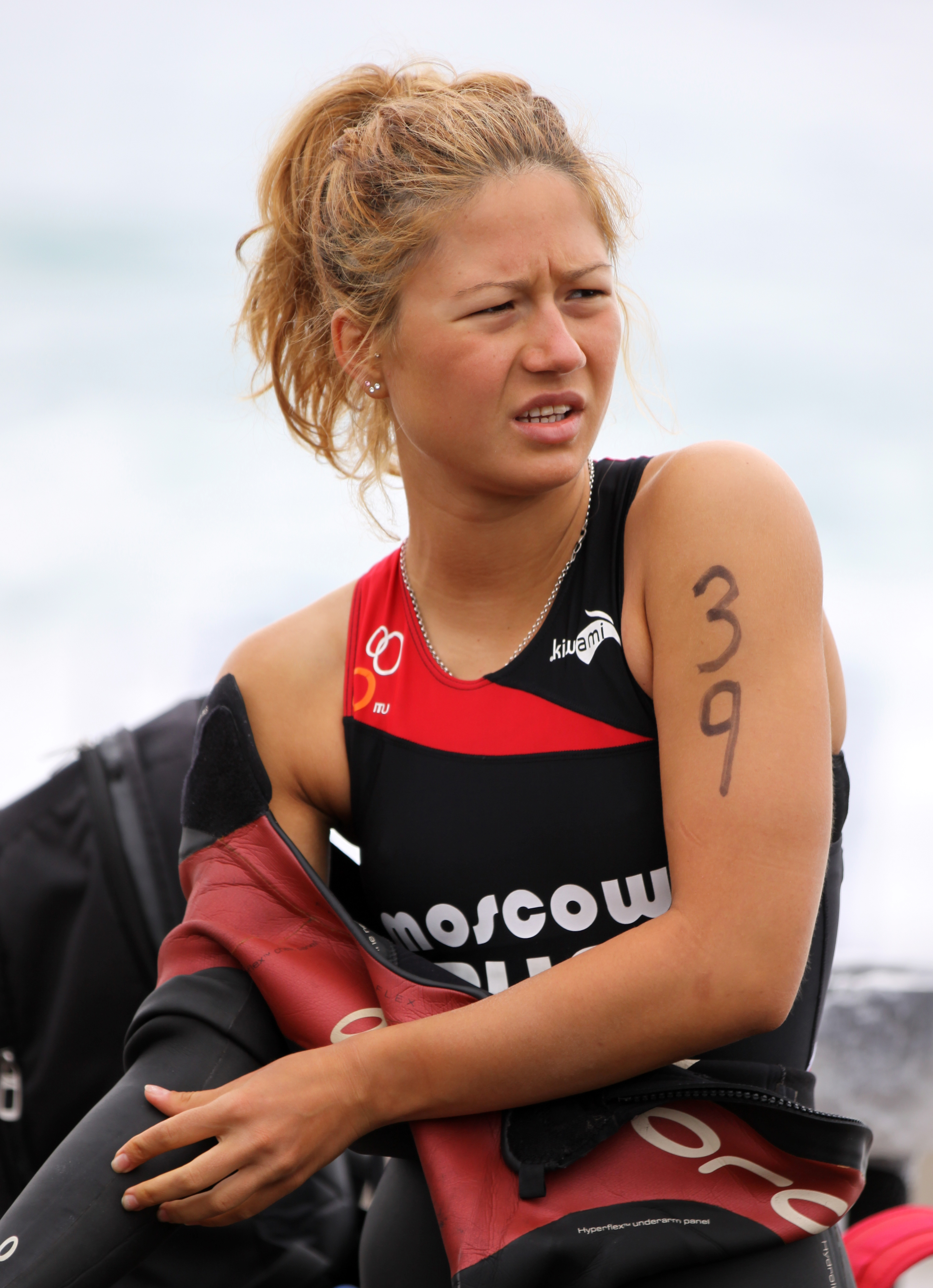
- Alena Adanichkina preparing for the Elite European Cup triathlon in Antalya, 2011.

Personal information
- Full name: Alena Vladislavovna Adanichkina
- Nationality: Russian
- Born: 3 July 1992 (age 33) Moscow

Sport
- Country: Russia
- Sport: Triathlon

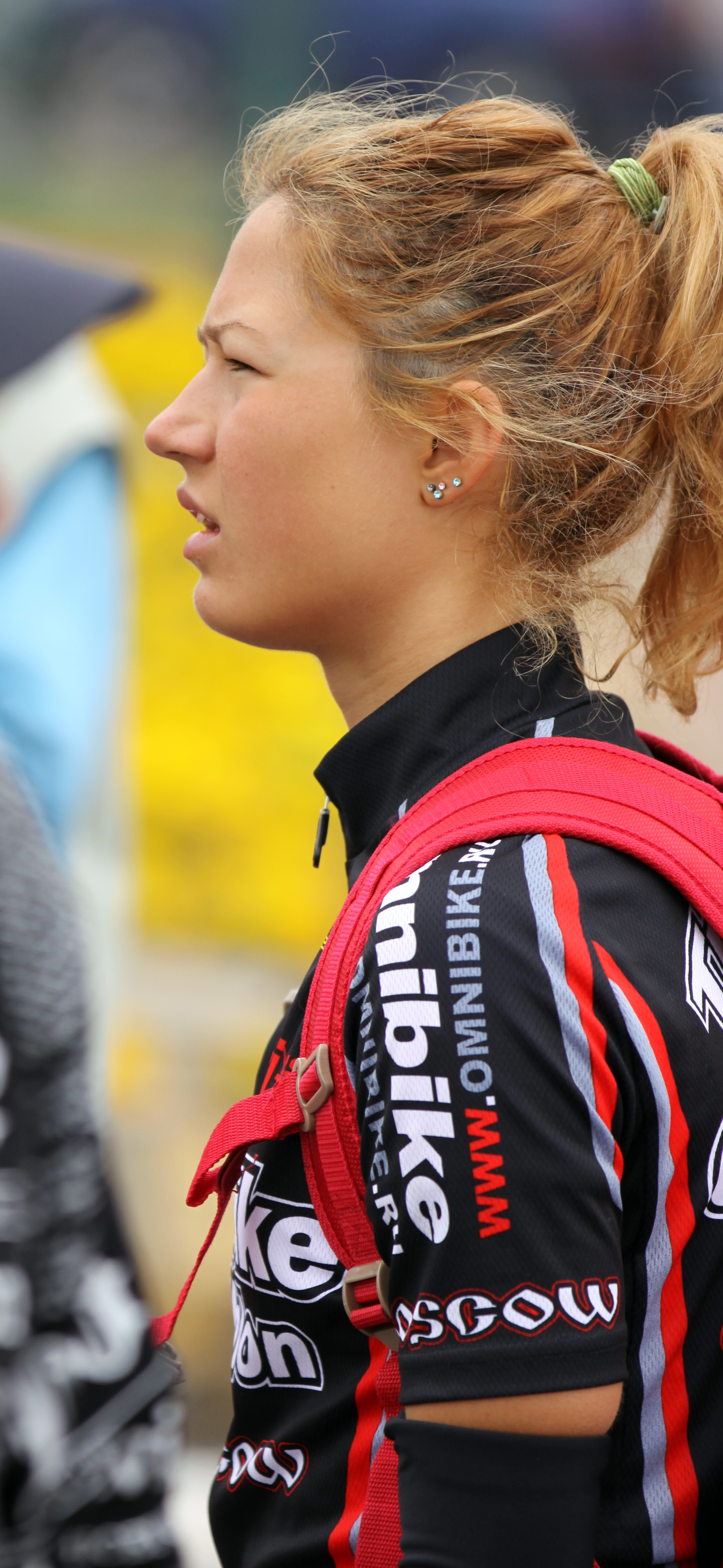
Alena Adanichkina ckecking in at the Elite European Cup triathlon in Antalya, 2011.

Alena Vladislavovna Adanichkina (also transcribed as Alyona, Russian Алёна Владиславовна Аданичкина; born 3 July 1992 in Moscow) is a professional Russian triathlete and a permanent member of the Russian National Team.

According to the Russian Ranking of the year 2010, Adanichkina was number 8 among the Russian U23 (Юниорки) triathletes. At the 2010 U23 (Юниорки) Russian Sprint Championships in Penza Adanichkina placed 7th.

Since 2011, Adanichkina takes part in Elite ITU triathlons. At the Volkswagen Aldiana Triathlon (27 March 2011) on Cyprus, where the Russian elite triathletes had their training camp, Adanichkina placed 10th on the Sprint distance.

== ITU Competitions ==
The following list is based upon the official ITU rankings and the athlete's Profile Page. Unless indicated otherwise, the following events are triathlons (Olympic Distance) and belong to the Elite category.

Date	Competition	Place	Rank
2008-10-26	Junior European Cup	Alanya	10
2009-08-08	Junior European Cup	Tiszaújváros	21
2010-10-24	Junior European Cup	Alanya	6
2011-04-03	European Cup	Antalya	27
2011-07-03	Junior European Cup	Penza	7
