= United States – Russia mutual detargeting =

Agreement not to target nuclear missiles at each other

Between 12 and 15 January 1994, President Bill Clinton of the United States and President Boris Yeltsin of the Russian Federation negotiated the Kremlin accords. These accords were an agreement between their respective countries not to target strategic nuclear missiles at each other.

The text of the agreement, which is thirteen paragraphs long, includes a single paragraph on the subject of detargeting. It specifies 30 May 1994 as the deadline for detargeting, and states that "for the first time in nearly half a century – virtually since the dawn of the nuclear age – Russia and United States will not operate nuclear forces, day-to-day, in a manner that presumes they are adversaries."

Detargeted missiles are reprogrammed to either have no target or, in the case of missiles that require a constant target (such as the Minuteman III), are set to open-ocean targets.

In 1997, during a debate over an amendment that would require the president to certify that Russia had detargeted its missiles, Representative Curt Weldon (R-PA) introduced into the Congressional Record a transcript of a 60 Minutes interview with Russian generals which stated that Russian intercontinental ballistic missiles could be retargeted to point to US targets within a matter of minutes. Weldon also pointed out that there is no way to verify that Russia has detargeted its missiles.
