= Dmitri Avramenko =

Russian professional football player

Personal information
- Full name: Dmitri Mikhaylovich Avramenko
- Date of birth: 8 June 1992 (age 34)
- Place of birth: Voronezh, Russia
- Height: 1.82 m (6 ft 0 in)
- Position: Forward

Senior career*
Years	Team	Apps	(Gls)
2012	FC Fakel Voronezh	2	(0)
2012–2013	FC Metallurg Lipetsk	19	(1)
2014	FC Vybor-Kurbatovo Voronezh	9	(1)
2015	FC Sochi	10	(1)
2015–2016	FC Dynamo Bryansk	33	(5)
2017	FC Dynamo Saint Petersburg	8	(2)
2017	→ FC Dynamo-2 Saint Petersburg	10	(3)
2018	FC Nosta Novotroitsk	7	(2)
2018–2019	FC Yevpatoria		
2019–2022	FC Lokomotiv Liski (amateur)		
2022–2023	FC Kolomna	21	(9)
2023	FC Saturn Ramenskoye	11	(4)
2023	FC Kolomna	12	(3)
2024	FC SKA Rostov-on-Don (amateur)		
- * Club domestic league appearances and goals

Dmitri Mikhaylovich Avramenko (Russian: Дмитрий Михайлович Авраменко; born 8 June 1992) is a Russian former professional football player.

== Club career ==
He made his Russian Football National League debut for FC Fakel Voronezh on 26 April 2012 in a game against FC Baltika Kaliningrad.
