= Yevgeny Petrovich Fyodorov =

Soviet Air Force general (1911–1993

- Евгений Петрович Фёдоров
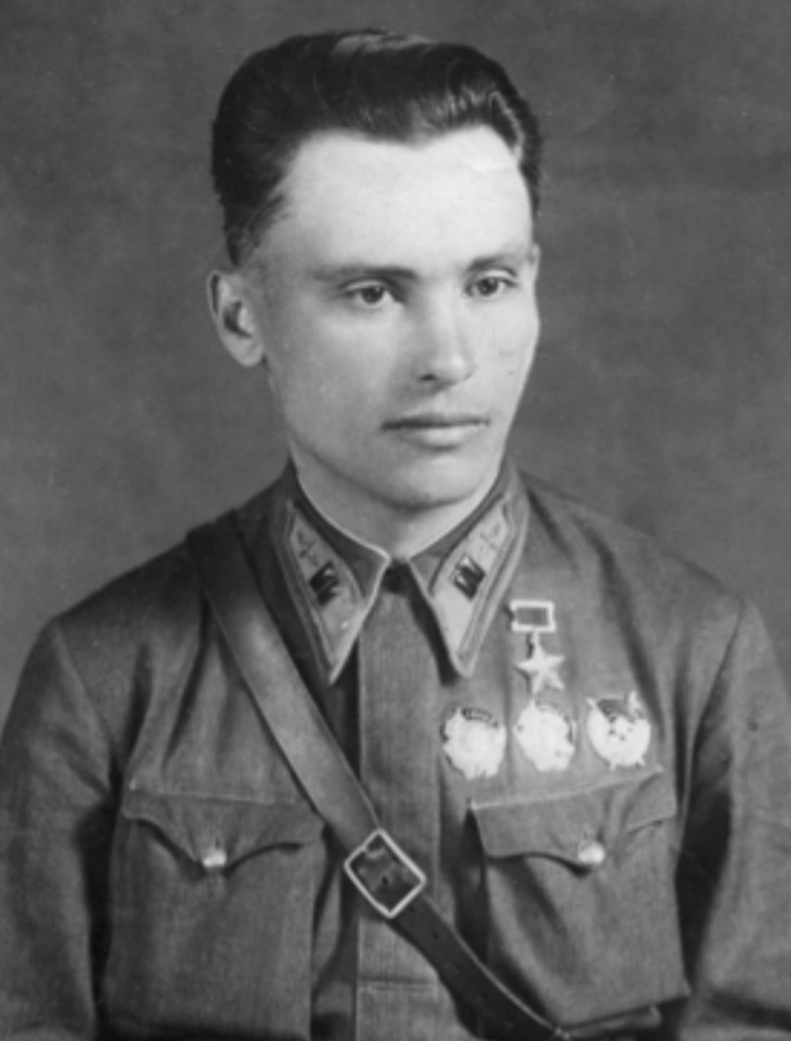
- Born: 28 December [O.S. 15 December] 1911; Strelna, Petergofsky Uyezd, Saint Petersburg Governorate, Russian Empire
- Died: 15 July 1993; St. Petersburg
- Military career
- Allegiance: Soviet Union
- Branch: Soviet Air Force
- Service years: 1930–58
- Rank: Major general
- Conflicts: World War II; Winter War; Eastern Front; Battle of Moscow; Berlin Offensive
- Awards: Hero of the Soviet Union (twice)

Yevgeny Petrovich Fyodorov (Russian: Евгений Петрович Фёдоров; 28 December [O.S. 15 December] 1911 – 15 July 1993) was a Soviet Air Force major general and double Hero of the Soviet Union. From 1933 Fyodorov served as a pilot in a Long Range Aviation regiment. He was a squadron commander during the Winter War and was awarded the title Hero of the Soviet Union for conducting bombing sorties. Fyodorov served with Long Range Aviation during World War II and was awarded the title Hero of the Soviet Union a second time for making strategic bombing sorties in June 1945. Fyodorov retired as a major general in 1958 and lived in Leningrad, where he worked at the airport.

== Early life ==
Fyodorov was born on 28 December [O.S. 15 December] 1911 in Strelna in Saint Petersburg Governorate in the family of a worker. He graduated from junior high school in 1926 and in 1929 from a trade school, working as a mechanic in a Leningrad rail depot. He was drafted into the Red Army in 1930. Fyodorov graduated from the Leningrad Military Pilot School in 1932 and the Orenburg Military Pilot School a year later. He joined the Communist Party of the Soviet Union in 1932. Between 1933 and 1937 he served as a pilot in a long range aviation regiment. In 1938 he became a detachment commander. Fyodorov became a squadron commander in the 6th Long Range Aviation Regiment of the 27th Long Range Aviation Division in 1939.

== Winter War and World War II ==
Fyodorov flew bombing sorties during the Winter War. Fyodorov reportedly made 24 sorties during the war. For his actions, he was awarded the title Hero of the Soviet Union and the Order of Lenin on 7 April 1940. When Operation Barbarossa was launched, he was still a squadron commander in Long Range Aviation. Fyodorov reportedly raided Berlin along with other aircraft on 9 September 1942. In 1943, Fyodorov became deputy commander of the 2nd Guards Long Range Aviation Division. On 13 June, he was awarded the Order of Alexander Nevsky. By the end of November 1944, he had reportedly made 178 sorties. For his actions, Fyodorov was awarded the title Hero of the Soviet Union a second time on 29 June 1945.

== Postwar ==
In 1946, Fyodorov was awarded the Order of the Red Star. Fyodorov graduated from the Air Force Academy in 1948. He received a second Order of the Red Banner in 1951. In 1954, he was awarded the Order of the Red Star. In 1956, he was awarded a third Order of Lenin. He was promoted to major general in 1957. He retired in 1958 and lived in Leningrad, working at the airport. On 6 April 1985, he was awarded the Order of the Patriotic War 1st class on the 40th anniversary of the end of World War II. Fyodorov died on 15 July 1993 and was buried in the city's Severnom Cemetery.

== Awards ==
- Twice Hero of the Soviet Union (7 April 1940 and 29 June 1945)
- Three Order of Lenin (7 April 1940, 29 March 1942, and 30 December 1956)
- Two Order of the Red Banner (15 January 1940 and 17 May 1951)
- Order of Aleksandr Nevsky (13 June 1943)
- Order of the Patriotic War 1st class (11 March 1985)
- Two Order of the Red Star (6 May 1946 and 29 April 1954)
