= Vladimir Burich =

Russian poet (1932–1994)

Vladimir Petrovich Burich (Russian: Влади́мир Петро́вич Бури́ч, IPA: [vlɐˈdʲimʲɪr pʲɪˈtrovʲɪdʑ bʊˈrʲitɕ]; August 6, 1932 – August 26, 1994) was a Russian poet.

He grew up in Kharkiv. He graduated from MSU Faculty of Journalism in 1955. He lived in Moscow working as an editor of Molodaya Gvardiya publishing house. Burich's poetry was occasionally published as early as 1961, but a certain degree of recognition came only in the 1980s and 90s with the appearance of the first collections of Russian vers libre "Beliy Kvadrat" (lit. White Square), "Vremya Iks" (lit. Time X) and later the Anthology of Russian vers libre. Burich was an ardent supporter of vers libre at a time when it was nearly nonexistent in the USSR. He translated modern Polish, Czech and Serbian poetry into Russian.

The poetry of Vladimir Burich is minimalist, precise and aphoristic, often with both social and philosophical overtones.

"Теорема тоски"

В угол локтя
вписана окружность головы
Не надо
ничего
доказывать

Translation:

"The Anguish Theorem"

In the angle of an elbow
inscribed the circle of a head
There's no need
to prove
anything

Often poignant and somber, Burich' vers libre attempts to contain as much emotion in as few as possible words.

"Ночь"

Я лежу на спине
и смотрю в потолок
с ушами полными слез

Translation:

"Night"

I'm lying on my back
and watching the ceiling
with my ears full of tears

== See also ==
- Russian literature
