= Nikolai Yudin =

Soviet historian of religion

- Born: Nikolai Ivanovich Yudin; 28 September 1898; Tula, Russian Empire
- Scientific career
- Fields: History

Nikolai Ivanovich Yudin (Russian: Николай Иванович Юдин; 28 September 1898, Tula – after 1966) was a Soviet historian of religion.

== Biography ==
His father was a clerk, while his mother was a worker. Until 1914 he studied in elementary school, but did not graduate from it. He served as a "boy" in the commercial and industrial enterprises of Tula, then worked at the Arms Plant as a turner apprentice, and a clerk. From 1915 to 1917 he wandered in search of work in the Caucasus, Persia, and Turkey. He served as a nurse, a disinfector, and a digger. In 1917 he served in the army as a private in Galicia. In 1918, he was released from military service due to injury. From 1918 to 1921 he worked in various organs of the Cheka: 1918–19 - Commissioner for Special Affairs of the Saratov and Tula Governorate Cheka; 1919-20 - in a special department of the Cheka of the 2nd Special Army; 1920 - in a special department of the Cheka of the Western Front; 1921 - assistant to the head of the special department of the Tula Governorate Cheka. From 1922 to 1928 he served as a people's investigator in the courts in the Vladimir Governorate, Moscow Governorate, and Tula Governorate.

In 1928 he entered the graduate school of the State Antireligious Museum with a degree in "History of Religion, Orthodoxy and Sectarianism" and devoted himself to anti-religious work. He was a lecturer-propagandist at the Leningrad Oblast Soviet of the League of Militant Atheists, and collaborated on magazines and newspapers: «Bezbozhnik», «Prizyv» (Vladimir), «Kommunar» (Tula), «Krasnyy put'» (Yegoryevsk), «Trudarmiya» (Voronezh) and others. He published his works also under the pseudonyms: I. Yudin (Russian: И. Юдин), N. Boytsov (Russian: Н. Бойцов), N. B. (Russian: Н. Б.).

In December 1930 he participated in the First All-Union Conference of research institutions on anti-religious work, organized by the Central Soviet of the League of Militant Atheists in Moscow. In connection with the restructuring of the principles of work of the League of Militant Atheists, Yudin left graduate school and worked in the Oblast Soviet of the League of Militant Atheists, and during 1934 to 1937 he was a correspondent in the editorial office of the newspaper «Stalinets» of the Oktyabrskaya Railway. In 1937, after a change of leadership in the Oblast Soviet of the League of Militant Atheists, he returned to anti-religious work.

On 10 May 1937, Yudin was enrolled in the State Public Library of the M. E. Saltykova-Shchedrin, the chief librarian of the First Department (Anti-religious philosophy). From 7 July to 1 September 1937, he was the acting head of the First Department. On 15 May 1938, he quit the library on a personal application. In March 1959, Yudin applied to the library for a document about working in the library for applying for a pension.

== Work ==
- Бойцов, Николай. «Антирелигиозная викторина» («Anti-Religious Quiz»)/ Николай Бойцов. - [Ленинград] : Прибой, 1929 (тип. им. Н. Бухарина Гос. изд-ва). - 59 с., [3] с. объявл.;
  - Бойцов, Николай. «Антирелигиозная викторина» («Anti-Religious Quiz»)/ Н. Бойцов. - 2-е изд., перераб. и доп. - Ленинград : [Огиз] : Прибой, 1931 (тип. им. Евг. Соколовой). - 60, [2] с., 2 с. объявл.;
- «Против праздника Одигитрии» («Against the Hodegetria Festival») - [Ленинград] : Б. и., [1930] (Ленинград : гос. тип. им. Евг. Соколовой). - [4] с.;
- В. Дружинин, Н. Бойцов «Непрерывка и антирелигиозная работа комсомольской ячейки» («Continuous and Anti-Religious Work of the Komsomol Cell»)/ В. Дружинин, Н. Бойцов; Обложка: Н. А. - Москва; Ленинград : Молодая гвардия, 1930 (Л. : тип. "Коминтерн" Центриздата). - 93, [3] с.; 16х11 см. - (Комсомол и непрерывка).
- И. Элиашевич (Элиашевич, Иосиф Яковлевич), Н. Бойцов «Религия и война» («Religion and War»)/ И. Элиашевич, Н. Бойцов. - [Ленинград] : Прибой, 1930 (тип. им. Н. Бухарина Гос. изд-ва). - 80 с.;
- «Religja a wojna» / J. Eljaszewicz, N. Bojcow. - Moskwa : CWL ZSRR, 1931 (книжная ф-ка Центриздата). - 54, [2] с.; 20х14 см. - (Bibljoteczka antyreligijna).
- «Антирелигиозная война» («Anti-Religious War»). Л., 1931.
- Бойцов, Николай. «Святейшая контрреволюция» («Most Holy Counter-Revolution»)/ Николай Бойцов. - Москва; Огиз; Ленинград : Мол. гвардия, 1931 (Л. : тип. "Мол. гвардия"). - 139, [2] с., 3 с. объявл.;
- Юдин, Николай Иванович. «Правда о петербургских "святынях"» («The Truth about the St. Petersburg "Sacral Objects"»). - Ленинград : Лениздат, 1962. - 131 с. : ил.;
  - Юдин, Николай Иванович. «Правда о петербургских "святынях"» («The Truth about the St. Petersburg "Sacral Objects"»). - [2-е изд., испр. и доп.]. - Ленинград : Лениздат, 1966. - 181 с. : ил.;
- Юдин, Николай Иванович. «Чуриковщина: (Секта "трезвенников")» («Churikovschina: (The Sect of "Teetotalers")») / О-во "Знание" РСФСР. Ленингр. отд-ние. - Ленинград : [б. и.], 1963. - 64 с. : ил.
