= Sergei Dubov =

Russian journalist, publisher and entrepreneur (1943–1994)

- Сергей Дубов
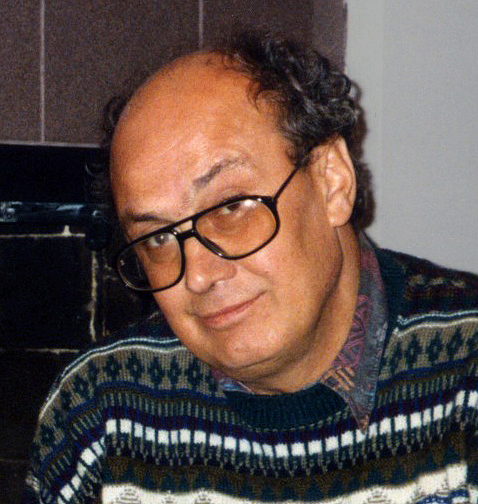
- Born: Sergei Leonidovich Dubov; 4 February 1943; Moscow, USSR
- Died: 1 February 1994 (aged 50); Moscow, Russia

Sergei Leonidovich Dubov (Russian: Серге́й Леонидович Дубов; 4 February 1943 – 1 February 1994) was a Russian journalist, publisher and entrepreneur. The Independent called him a "brilliant businessman". He was murdered in 1994.

== Biography ==
Dubov graduated from the Moscow Poligraphical Institute (now the Moscow State University of Printing Arts) editorial department. He worked on TV and then for the newspaper Book Review. He became chairman of the "New Times" publishing house, which published Vsyo Dlya Vas, Novoye Vremya, and International and Moscow Business Week.

He was the first publisher in Russian of Viktor Suvorov's books Icebreaker, Aquarium, Day-M and others.

== Death ==
He was murdered on 1 February 1994. The assassin waited in a phone booth, and when Dubov was going to his car in the morning shot him in the back of the head. Earlier, Dubov had received threats by telephone and by mail. There was a team of investigators from the Ministry of Interior, and the MUR (abbreviation for The Moscow Investigation Department) District police station established to investigate the murder. President Boris Yeltsin closely monitored the case. However, it has never been resolved.

== See also ==
- List of unsolved murders (1980–1999)
