= Lev Bashmakov =

Russian politician (1938–2018)

- Лев Башмаков

1st Governor of Ryazan Oblast
- In office 25 September 1991 – 25 January 1994
- Succeeded by: Gennady Merkulov

Chairman of the Executive Committee of the Ryazan Regional Council
- In office December 1988 – March 1990
- Preceded by: Vasily Zhirkov
- Succeeded by: Valery Kalashnikov

Personal details
- Born: Lev Poliyevktovich Bashmakov; 26 February 1938 Shuya, Ivanovo Oblast, Russian SFSR, Soviet Union
- Died: 30 December 2018 (aged 80) Yegoryevsk, Moscow Oblast, Russia

Lev Poliyevktovich Bashmakov (Russian: Лев Полиевктович Башмаков; 26 February 1938 – 30 December 2018) was a Russian politician who served as the first governor of Ryazan Oblast from 1991 to 1994.

He was also the chairman of the Ryazan regional executive committee from 1988 to 1991.

== Biography ==
Lev Bashmakov was born on 26 February 1938 in the city of Shuya, Ivanovo Oblast. In 1961, he graduated from the Krasnoyarsk Polytechnic Institute.

From 1961 to 1966, process engineer, head of the bureau, and then the deputy head of the workshop of a defense enterprise in Krasnoyarsk.

From 1966 to 1980, he was the senior engineer, the deputy head of production, and then the deputy director of the Khmelnitsky Radio Engineering Plant.

From 1980 to 1983, he became the Director of the Rivne Mechanical Plant.

From 1983 to 1988, he became the General Director of the Ryazan production association "Red Banner".

From December 1988 to March 1990 he was chairman of the Executive Committee of the Ryazan Oblast Council of People's Deputies.

From 1990 to 1991, he was the Marketing Director of Internaut Joint Venture.

On 25 September 1991, Bashmakov was appointed first head of administration of the Ryazan Oblast

In the autumn of 1993, he supported President Boris Yeltsin's actions aimed at dissolving the Congress of People's Deputies, the Supreme and local Soviets. During the election campaign in December 1993, he repeatedly stated that he fully supported the presidential draft of the Constitution and considered himself a supporter of the Choice of Russia electoral bloc.

On 25 January 1994, he was dismissed from his post by decree of the President of the Russia with the wording "for the systematic excess of his powers, failure to ensure the implementation of presidential decrees aimed at establishing a market economy."

In his later years, he was the director of LLC Belkovsky Food Processing Plant.

Lev Poliyevktovich Bashmakov died on 30 December 2018 in Yegoryevsk. He was buried at the Bogorodskoye cemetery in Ryazan.
