= 1919 in Russia =

- Decades: 1890s; 1900s; 1910s; 1920s; 1930s
- See also: History of Russia; Timeline of Russian history; List of years in Russia

Events from the year 1919 in Russia

== Events ==
- 8th Congress of the Russian Communist Party (Bolsheviks)
- Battle of Berezina (1919)
- Kiev pogroms (1919)
- Suchan Valley Campaign

== Births ==
- August 18 – Evdokia Bobyleva, Russian teacher (d. 2017)
- September 9 – Pyotr Braiko, Soviet soldier (d. 2018)
- November 10 - Mikhail Kalashnikov, Russian firearms designer (d. 2013)
- December 5 - Klavdiya Gadyuchkina, Russian supercentenarian (d. 2025)
- December 23 – Vasily Reshetnikov, Soviet Air Force pilot (d. 2023)

== Deaths ==
- January 1 - Mikhail Drozdovsky, Russian general (b. 1881)
- January 27 – Nikolai Iudovich Ivanov, Russian general (b. 1851)
- January 28 – Grand Duke Dmitry Konstantinovich of Russia (b. 1860)
- February 16 – Vera Kholodnaya, Actress and the first star of Russian silent cinema (b. 1893)
- March 16 – Yakov Sverdlov, Bolshevik revolutionary and politician (b. 1885)
- April 19 – Andrei Eberhardt, Russian admiral (b. 1856)
- April 20 – Vasili Altfater, Russian and Soviet admiral (b. 1883)
- June 29 – Alexander Ragoza, Russian general and Ukrainian politician (executed) (b. 1858)
- September 16 – Alfred Parland, Russian architect (b. 1842)
- August 9 - Leonid Andreyev, Russian playwright and writer (b. 1871)
- December 16 – Julia Lermontova, Russian chemist (b. 1846)
