= 1916 in Russia =

- Decades: 1890s; 1900s; 1910s; 1920s; 1930s
- See also: History of Russia; Timeline of Russian history; List of years in Russia

Events from the year 1916 in Russia.

== Incumbents ==
- Monarch – Nicholas II
- Chairman of the Council of Ministers –
  - until 2 February – Ivan Logginovich Goremykin
  - 2 February-23 November – Boris Stürmer
  - starting 23 November – Alexander Fyodorovich Trepov

== Events ==
- Baranovichi Offensive
- Battle of Kostiuchnówka
- Battle of Bitlis
- Brusilov Offensive
- Battle of Erzincan
- Erzurum Offensive
- Battle of Kowel
- Lake Naroch Offensive
- Trebizond Campaign
- Urkun

== Births ==
- 17 January — Tatyana Karpova, actress (died 2018)
- 29 January — Kyra Vayne, Russian-born British opera singer (died 2001)
- 22 July — Irene Galitzine, Russian-Georgian fashion designer (died 2006)
- 20 August — Paul Felix Schmidt, Estonian chess player (died 1984)
- 9 September — Ada Tschechowa, Russo-German actress (died 1966)
- 21 September — Zinovy Gerdt, actor (died 1996)
- 4 October — Vitaly Ginzburg, physicist (died 2009)
- 19 October — Emil Gilels, pianist (died 1985)

== Deaths ==
- February 9 – Anton Yegorovich von Saltza, general (b. 1843)
- March 19 – Vasily Surikov, painter (b. 1848)
- March 28 – Paul von Plehwe, general (b. 1850)
- May 1 – Lydia Zvereva, first Russian woman to earn a pilot's licence (b. 1890)
- May 13 – Sholem Aleichem, Ukrainian Yiddish writer (b. 1859)
- May 28 – Ivan Franko, Ukrainian writer and political activist (b. 1856)
- July 2 – Mikhail Pomortsev, meteorologist (b. 1851)
- July 3 – Jeremiah Lomnytskyj, Ukrainian Basilian priest, missionary and servant of God (b. 1860)
- July 15 – Élie Metchnikoff, microbiologist, recipient of the Nobel Prize in Physiology or Medicine (b. 1845)
- September 2 – Gennady Ladyzhensky, Russian painter (b. 1852)
