= Vladislav Tumanov =

Russian politician (born 1958)

- Владислав Туманов
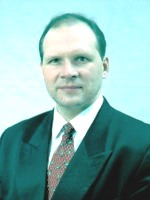

First Deputy Presidential Envoy to the Ural Federal District
- In office 5 August 2000 – 1 August 2006
- Preceded by: Office established

2nd Head of Pskov Oblast Administration
- In office 22 May 1992 – 10 November 1996
- Preceded by: Anatoly Dobryakov
- Succeeded by: Yevgeny Mikhailov (as Governor)

Senator from Pskov Oblast
- In office 11 January 1994 – 23 January 1996

Personal details
- Born: Vladislav Nikolayevich Tumanov; 29 January 1958 (age 68) Sverdlovsk, Russian SFSR, Soviet Union
- Party: Our Home - Russia

Vladislav Nikolayevich Tumanov (Russian: Владислав Николаевич Туманов; born 29 January 1958) is a Russian politician who was the 2nd Governor of Pskov Oblast from 1992 to 1996.

He is the chairman of the Arbitration Court of Kaluga Oblast, and the chairman of the Pskov branch of the Imperial Orthodox Palestine Society.

== Biography ==
Vladislav Tumanov was born on 29 January 1958.

In 1983, he graduated from the Faculty of Legal Service in the National Economy of the Sverdlovsk Law Institute with a degree in jurisprudence.

Between 1983 and 1990, he was the Legal Advisor, Head of the Legal Bureau, Head of the Legal Department of the Pskov Plant of Mechanical Drives, Deputy Director of the North-West Center of the All-Union Law Firm "Kontrakt" of the Union of Lawyers of the Soviet Union.

From 1989 to 1992 he was a member of the All-Russian social and political movement "Democratic Russia", was a member of the deputy group in the Pskov Regional Council of People's Deputies.

In 1990, he was elected a deputy of the Pskov Regional Council of People's Deputies.

From March to May 1992, he was the First Deputy Head of the Pskov City Administration for Economic Reform.

On 22 May 1992, Tumanov was appointed the 2nd Governor (Head) of Pskov Oblast.

In December 1993, he was elected to the Federation Council, and was a member of the Committee on Constitutional Legislation and Judicial-Legal Issues. From 23 January to 4 December 1996, he was an ex-officio member of the Federation Council. In December 1996, Tumanov again ran for the post of governor of the Pskov Oblast, in the first round he took first place (30.92% of the votes), in the second round he lost to Yevgeny Mikhailov, gaining 35.86% of the votes.

In, 17 December 1996 - First Deputy Minister, and from 28 January 1997 to 4 December 1998 - State Secretary - First Deputy Minister of the Russian Federation for Nationalities and Federal Relations.

From 4 December 1998 to 21 August 2000, he was demoted to Deputy Minister of National Policy of the Russian Federation, as since 1997, he was a member of the Conciliation Commission for the settlement of disagreements between the bodies of state power of Russia and Ingushetia on some provisions of the Constitution of the Republic of Ingushetia, ensuring its compliance with the Russian constitution and its federal laws.

On 5 August 2000, Tubanov became the First Deputy Plenipotentiary Representative of the Ural Federal District. In 2006, he became the Chief Advisor to the Office of Advisers of the Presidential Administration of Russia.

From 1 August 2006 to July 2015, he was the First Deputy, Deputy Chairman of the Federal Arbitration Court of the Moscow District.

From 11 January 2016 to July 2019, he was the Deputy Chairman of the Arbitration Court of the East Siberian District.

On 19 January 2019, he was appointed Chairman of the Arbitration Court of the Kaluga Oblast.
