= Yevgeny Komarov =

Russian politician

- Евгений Комаров
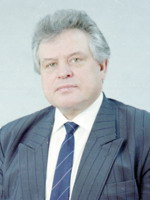

1st Head of Administration of Murmansk Oblast
- In office 10 November 1991 – 7 December 1996
- Succeeded by: Yury Yevdokimov

Chairman of the State Committee of the RSFSR for Social and Economic Development of the North
- In office 11 October 1990 – 15 November 1991
- Prime Minister: Ivan Silayev
- Succeeded by: Vladimir Kuramin

Personal details
- Born: Yevgeny Borisovich Komarov; 10 April 1942 (age 84) Bolshoye Kuznechkovo, Kuvshinovsky District, Kalinin Oblast, RSFSR, Soviet Union

Yevgeny Borisovich Komarov (Russian: Евге́ний Бори́сович Комаро́в; born 10 April 1942), is a Russian statesman and political party manager. He served as the 1st Governor (Head) of the Murmansk Oblast from 1991 to 1996.

== Biography ==
Yevgeny Komarov was born in a small village of Bolshoye Kuznechkovo on 10 April 1942.

In 1961, he graduated from the Rzhevskoe Railway School, after which he got a job as a foreman for repairing the track at the station of the Kolsky District of the Murmansk Oblast. He went to the Soviet army by conscription in the same year, serving in the Murmansk Oblast.

From 1964, he worked as an electrician at the Pechenganikel Mining and Metallurgical Combine. A year later, in 1965, he entered the CPSU.

From 1972, he began his employment on the party work in Pechenga, and then in the Kovdorsky District Committee of the CPSU.

In 1982, Komarov became chairman of the executive committee of the Kovdorsky District Council of People's Deputies, and in 1984 the first secretary of the Kovdorsky District Committee of the CPSU. In 1985, he graduated from the Leningrad Financial and Economic Institute. And in 1988, he became secretary and member of the bureau of the regional party committee.

On 11 October 1990, by a resolution of the Supreme Soviet of the RSFSR, Yevgeny Komarov was approved by the chairman of the RSFSR State Committee on the Social and Economic Development of the North.

== Governor of Murmansk Oblast ==
By decree of the President of the RSFSR of November 7, 1991, Yevgeny Komarov, at the age of 49, was appointed head of the administration of the Murmansk Oblast, by Boris Yeltsin. He took office on November 10, 1991. In December 1996, he lost the election to Yury Yevdokimov (in the first round, he won first place among 8 candidates (31% of the vote), in the second round he received 40.64%, giving Evdokimov less than 3%). In 2000, he ran for governor against Yedokimov again, but lost, gaining only 3.37% of the vote.
