= Ivan Shabunin =

Russian politician (1935–2006)

- Иван Шабунин
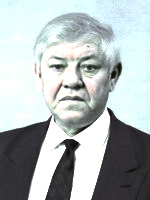
- Shabunin c. 1993-1997

1st Head of Administration of Volgograd Oblast
- In office 4 September 1991 – 6 January 1997
- Succeeded by: Nikolay Maksyuta

Personal details
- Born: Ivan Petrovich Shabunin; 9 October 1935 Novoanninsky, Stalingrad Krai, RSFSR, Soviet Union
- Died: 20 September 2006 (aged 70) Volgograd, Russia
- Spouse: Ivetta Mihailovna Shabunina
- Children: 1

Ivan Petrovich Shabunin (Russian: Иван Петрович Шабунин; 9 October 1935 - 20 September 2006), was a Russian politician who served as the 1st Governor of Volgograd Oblast from 1991 to 1997.

== Career ==
Ivan Shabunin was born on October 9, 1935, in the town of Novoanninsky, modern Volgograd Oblast. He graduated in the Volgograd Agricultural Institute. He graduated from graduate school, had a degree of candidate of economic sciences.

In 1990 he was elected people's deputy of the RSFSR, was a member of the Supreme Council Committee on economic reform and property. In 1990-1991 he was chairman of the executive committee of the Volgograd Regional Council.

September 4, 1991 appointed Head of Administration of Volgograd Oblast, he remained in this post until 1996.

In December 1993, he was elected to the Federation Council. At the same time, he was a member of the Committee on the Affairs of the Commonwealth of Independent States. After the reform of the Federation Council in 1996, he became a member of the Committee on Agricultural Policy.

In 1996, in the first gubernatorial elections in the history of Volgograd Oblast, he lost to Nikolay Maksyuta.

In 1997 he was invited to the post of first deputy chairman of the CIS Executive Committee in Minsk, where he worked until 1999, but was forced to return to Volgograd due to unabating longing for his native land.

In 2003 he was appointed advisor to the mayor of Volgograd. He held the post until his death, September 20, 2006.

=== Death ===
Ivan Petrovich Shabunin died on, September 20, 2006, after a long illness. He was buried in the cemetery in the Volgograd Dzerzhinsk district. A year after his death, Volgograd held a memorial service for the first governor of the region and an honorary citizen of the city-hero of the region. A sculptor, Pavel Cherkis, dedicated a monument to him, which the project cost 190 thousand rubles.

== Family ==
- Spouse: Ivetta Mihailovna Gamazova (Shabunina)
- Daughter: Natalia Ivanovna Shabunina
- Grandson: Zurab Nikolaevich Machavariani
