= Adolf Laptev =

Russian statesman and political figure

- Адольф Лаптев

1st Governor of Ivanovo Oblast
- In office 24 December 1991 – 22 January 1996
- Succeeded by: Vladislav Tikhomirov

20th Chairman of the Executive Committee of the Ivanovo Regional Council
- In office 1990–1991
- Preceded by: Vladislav Tikhomirov
- Succeeded by: Position abolished

Chairman of the Executive Committee of the Ivanovo City Council
- In office 1969–1974

Personal details
- Born: Adolf Fyodorovich Laptev; 18 November 1935 Ivanovo, RSFSR, Soviet Union
- Died: 16 November 2005 (aged 69) Ivanovo, Russia

Adolf Fyodorovich Laptev (Russian: Адольф Фёдорович Лаптев; 18 November 1935 – 16 November 2005), was a Russian politician, who was the first Governor of the Ivanovo Oblast from 1991 to 1996, as well as the chairman of the executive committee of the Ivanovo Regional Council, representing the Soviet Union from 1990 to 1991.

== Biography ==
Adolf Laptev was born in Ivanovo on 18 November 1935.

He graduated from the Ivanovo Industrial College in 1954, and the Ivanovo Energy Institute in 1968.

Laptev worked as a senior and chief engineer of the municipal services department of the Ivanovo Oblast, and was at party work. From 1969 to 1974, he was chairman of the executive committee of the Ivanovo City Council, then, the Head of Glavivanovostroit, which was sent as a construction adviser to Laos.

From 1986 to 1987, he was the First Deputy Chairman of the Regional Agro-Industrial Committee and in 1987, Laptev became deputy chairman. From 1990 to 1991, he was chairman of the executive committee of the Ivanovo Regional Council of People's Deputies.

On 24 December 1991, Laptev became to 1st Governor of the Ivanovo Oblast. He was dismissed by President Boris Yeltsin on 22 January 1996. Laptev retired from politics in 2002.

He died in Ivanovo on 16 November 2005, two days before his 70th birthday.
