= Yury Belykh =

Russian politician

- Юрий Белых
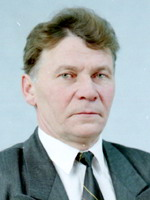

1st Governor of Saratov Oblast
- In office 30 June 1992 – 21 February 1996
- Succeeded by: Dmitry Ayatskov

Personal details
- Born: Yury Vasilyevich Belykh; 30 September 1941 (age 83); Nikolayevka, Russia, Soviet Union
- Political party: Our Home - Russia

Yury Vasilyevich Belykh (Russian: Юрий Васильевич Белых; born 30 September 1941), is a Russian politician who had served as the 1st Governor of Saratov Oblast from 1992 to 1996.

== Biography ==
Yury Belykh was born on 30 September 1941 in the village of Nikolayevka, in the Ivanteyevsky District, of the Saratov Oblast, in a family of employees.

After leaving school, he entered the Saratov Technical School No. 1, graduating with a degree in metal turner. In 1967, he graduated from the N. I. Vavilov Saratov Agricultural Institute with a degree in agronomy.

From 1960 to 1962, he was a turner at the enterprise p / box 122 in Saratov. In 1965, he was sent to the state farm "Bartenevsky" to the post of chief agronomist.

From 1973 to 1974, he was the chairman of the collective farm "named after N.K. Krupskaya" in the Tatishchevo district.

From 1974 to 1983 he was the director of the Lesnoy state farm, and from 1983 to 1985 he was the head of the department of state farms in the Tatishevsky district.

From September 1985 to February 1992, he was the Director of the Dubkovskaya poultry farm in the Saratov Oblast.

Belykh was member of the CPSU until August 1991. He was the people's Deputy of the Russian Federation from March 1990 until 1993, when he was deprived of his mandate for not appearing at the X Extraordinary Congress.

By decree of the President of Russia, Boris Yeltsin, on 25 February 1992, Belykh was appointed acting head of the administration of the Saratov Oblast. On 30 June, he was sworn in office as the 1st Governor (Head) of the Saratov Oblast.

Belykh was the member of the Federation Council of from 11 January 1994 to 10 April 1996, and was a member of the Committee on Budget, Financial, Currency and Credit Regulation, Money Issue, Tax Policy and Customs Regulation.

On 21 February 1996, he was dismissed from his post as governor by President Yeltsin, citing then words "for gross violations of the labor rights of citizens, expressed in the misuse of funds allocated from the federal budget and intended for the payment of wages to public sector workers, other social benefits.". On 15 April, Yeltsin signed a decree, appointing Dmitry Ayatskov as the new governor.

== Family ==
He is married and has two children.
