= Aleksandr Deryagin =

Russian politician

- Александр Дерягин

1st Governor of Kaluga Oblast
- In office 25 September 1991 – 7 March 1996
- Succeeded by: Oleg Savchenko

Personal details
- Born: Aleksandr Vasilyevich Deryargin; 19 February 1941; Churkinskaya, Vilegodsky District, Arkhangelsk Oblast, RSFSR, Soviet Union
- Died: 16 July 2010 (aged 69); Kaluga, Russia

Aleksandr Vasilyevich Deryagin (Russian: Александр Васильевич Дерягин; 19 February 1941 – 16 July 2010), was a Russian politician who had served as the first Governor of Kaluga Oblast from 1991 to 1996. He was the corresponding member of the Russian Academy of Sciences in 1991.

== Biography ==
Aleksandr Deryargin was born on 19 February 1941. In 1990, Deryagin was elected a people's deputy of the RSFSR, and in 1991 he was the chairman of the committee on science and public education of the Supreme Council of Russia. In the same year, he was a corresponding member of the Russian Academy of Sciences. In 1997, he was the President of the Kaluga Scientific Center. Aleksandr Vasilyevich Deryagin died in Kaluga on 16 July 2010. In 2011, the Kaluga Regional Research Center was renamed dedicated to his name in his memory.
