= Vasily Shuteyev =

Russian politician

- Василий Шутеев
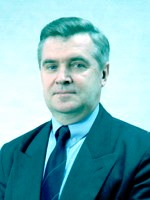

1st Governor of Kursk Oblast
- In office 11 December 1991 – 23 October 1996
- Succeeded by: Alexander Rutskoy

Personal details
- Born: 23 July 1942 (age 82); Alekseyevka, Russian SFSR, Soviet Union

Vasily Ivanovich Shuteyev (Russian: Василий Иванович Шутеев; born 23 July 1942) is a Russian politician who had served as the first Governor of Kursk Oblast from 1991 to 1996.

== Biography ==
Vasily Shuteyev was born on 23 July 1942 in Alekseyevka, Kromskoy District, Oryol Oblast, to a peasant family.

=== Education and work ===
He graduated from the Novocherkassk Exploration College, Kursk Polytechnic Institute in 1970.

He began his career as an assistant drilling foreman of a geological exploration expedition. In 1970, he worked at the Schetmash plant as an engineer, head of the SKB, head of the workshop. In 1980, he was promoted to chief engineer. In 1984, he was promoted director of the plant, then general director of PO "Schetmash".

== Political activity ==
In 1988, he was the head of the main planning and economic department. At the same time, since 1989, he was the first deputy chairman of the Kursk regional executive committee. In October 1991, he became the chairman of the regional executive committee.

On 11 December 1991, Shuteyev was appointed the first Governor (Head) of Kursk Oblast. In December 1993, he was elected to the Federation Council of the first convocation, was a member of the Committee on International Affairs. In January 1996, he became a member of the Federation Council of the Russian Federation of the second convocation ex officio, was a member of the Committee on Security and Defense.

On 20 October 1996, in the election of the governor of the Kursk region, Shuteyev lost the election to Alexander Rutskoy, gaining 17.55% of the vote. After his concession, he retired from politics and took up farming in the village of Shestopalovo, in Kursk Oblast.
