= Viktor Mikhailov (politician) =

Russian politician (1936–2023)

- Виктор Михайлов
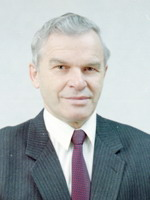

1st Governor (Head) of Magadan Oblast
- In office 24 October 1991 – 15 November 1996
- Succeeded by: Valentin Tsvetkov

Personal details
- Born: Viktor Grigoryevich Mikhailov; 1 April 1936; Kuvandyk, Orenburg Oblast, Russian SFSR, USSR
- Died: 30 November 2023 (aged 87)

Viktor Grigoryevich Mikhailov (Russian: Виктор Григорьевич Михайлов; 1 April 1936 – 30 November 2023) was a Russian politician who served as the first Governor (Head) of Magadan Oblast from 1991 to 1996.

== Biography ==
Viktor Mikhailov was born in Kuvandyk, in Orenburg Oblast. From January to November 1996, he was a Member of the Federation Council, member of the Committee on Budget, Tax Policy, Financial, Currency and Customs Regulation.

For his work, he was awarded the Order of Friendship in 1996 and given the Gratitude of the President of the Russian Federation also in 1996. Mikhailov died on 30 November 2023, at the age of 87.
