= Nikolai Sevryugin =

Russian politician (1939–2002)

- Николай Севрюгин
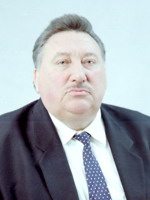

1st Governor of Tula Oblast
- In office 20 October 1991 – 31 March 1997
- Succeeded by: Vasily Starodubtsev

Personal details
- Born: Nikolai Vasilyevich Sevryugin; 16 February 1939 Vecherino Vyselki, Mikhaylovsky District, Ryazan Oblast, RSFSR, Soviet Union
- Died: 26 March 2002 (aged 63) Tula, Russia
- Party: Our Home – Russia

Nikolai Vasilyevich Sevryugin (Russian: Никола́й Васи́льевич Севрю́гин; 16 February 1939 – 26 March 2002) was a Russian politician and governor of Tula Oblast from October 1991 (appointed by Boris Yeltsin) to March 1997. He was charged with taking bribes after he left office, but postponements of the case, including for his declining health, led to his death before any outcome on the charges against him.

Government offices
Preceded by none	Governor of Tula Oblast; 1991-1997	Succeeded by Vasily Starodubtsev
