= Anatoly Glushenkov =

Russian politician

- Анатолий Глушенков
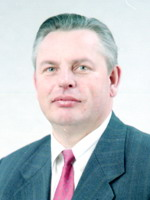

2nd Governor of Smolensk Oblast
- In office 29 April 1993 – 29 May 1998
- Preceded by: Valery Fateyev
- Succeeded by: Aleksandr Prokhorov

Personal details
- Born: 20 November 1942 Sokolovo, Smolensky District, Smolensk Oblast, Russia, U.S.S.R.
- Died: 16 January 2018 (aged 75) Smolensk, Russia
- Education: Saint Petersburg State University of Aerospace Instrumentation

Anatoly Yegorovich Glushenkov (Russian: Анатолий Егорович Глушенков, 20 November 1942 – 16 January 2018) was a Russian politician who served as the Governor of Smolensk Oblast from 1993 to 1998. Notably, Glushenkov was the first popularly elected Governor of Smolensk Oblast.

== Career ==
Glushenkov, a manufacturer and then-head of a refrigerator factory in Smolensk, was elected Governor on Smolensk Oblast on 25 April 1993, becoming the first democratically elected governor of the region. Glushenkov defeated incumbent, Governor Valery Fateyev, a member of Democratic Choice of Russia who had been appointed Smolensk Oblast's governor by President Boris Yeltsin.

Governor Glushenkov served in office for one term from 1993 until 1998. In May 1998, he lost re-election to Alexander Prokhorov of Communist Party of the Russian Federation.

Shortly after leaving the governor's office, Glushenkov moved to Moscow. He was elected to the national Federation Council, where he chaired the Committee on the Commonwealth of Independent States. He retired from politics during the late 2000s.

== Death ==
Anatoly Glushenkov died in Smolensk on 16 January 2018, at the age of 76.
