= Mikhail Kislyuk =

Ukrainian-born Russian politician

- Михаил Кислюк
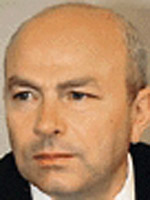

1st Governor of Kemerovo Oblast
- In office 27 August 1991 – 1 July 1997
- Succeeded by: Aman Tuleyev

Personal details
- Born: Mikhail Borisovich Kislyuk; 30 April 1951 (age 75) Zhytomyr, Ukrainian SSR, Soviet Union
- Party: Democratic Party of Russia
- Spouse: Lyubov Anatolyevna Kislyuk
- Children: Polina Mikhaylovna Kislyuk; Daria Mikhaylovna Kislyuk

Mikhail Borisovich Kislyuk (Russian: Михаил Борисович Кислюк; born 30 April 1951), is a Ukrainian-born Russian politician who had last served as the 1st Governor of Kemerovo Oblast from 1991 to 1997. He was head of the Federal Service for the Regulation of Natural Monopolies in Transport from 1997 to 1998. He is also a member of the Democratic Party of Russia.

== Biography ==
Mikhail Kislyuk was born on 30 April 1951, in Zhytomyr, Ukraine. He recognizes himself as a born Siberian. His parents arrived at the construction site of the Bachatsky open-cut mine in the late 40s, before the birth of their son, but due to the complete lack of medical infrastructure in the village under construction, his mother went to give birth to Zhytomyr.

Kislyuk graduated from the Kuzbass Polytechnic Institute with a degree in mining engineer in 1973.

Since 1973, he worked as a mining foreman at the Kedrovsky open-pit mine in Kemerovo.

Kislyuk was member of the CPSU from 1976 to August 1991.

Since 1976, he was the chief technologist. In 1978, he became chief economist of the Baydaevsky open-pit mine in Novokuznetsk. In 198, he was the Deputy Head of the Planning and Economic Department, Chief Miner of the Kemerovougol Production Association. From 1986 to 1990, he was Deputy Director for Economics of the Chernigovskiy Mine, at the same time taught general theory of statistics and economics of the mining industry at the Kuzbass Polytechnic Institute.

He was one of the initiators of the creation in November 1989 of the Union of Kuzbass Workers, a member of the leadership of the Council of Kuzbass Workers' Committees.

From 1990 to 1991, he was the Deputy Chairman of the Executive Committee of the Kemerovo Regional Council of People's Deputies. In the spring of 1990, Kislyuk was elected People's Deputy of the RSFSR, and was a member of the deputy groups "Democratic Russia" and "Radical Democrats".

In August 1991, during the GKChP days, Kislyuk was among the defenders of the White House, for which in the same month he was appointed 1st Governor (Head) of Kemerovo Oblast. In the fall of 1993, Kislyuk supported the violent dispersal of the Congress and the Supreme Council. During his reign he supported President Boris Yeltsin.

In 1995 he received the title of Doctor of Science for the development of the "Kuzbass model of development."

From 23 January 1996 to 1 July 1997, he was the member member of the Federation Council, member of the Federation Council Committee on legislation and judicial and legal issues. By the decree of the President of Russia, on 1 July 1997, Kislyuk was relieved of his post as governor.

In 1997, he received the title of candidate of economic sciences.

=== After Kuzbass ===
From July 1997 to 8 May 1998, Kislyuk was head of the Federal Commission for the Regulation of Transport Tariffs, then headed the Federal Service for the Regulation of Natural Monopolies in Transport, created on the basis of the commission. He was released from office at personal request.

Since June 1998, Kislyuk was the adviser of the Russian Government, and at the same time, the President of the Russian Society of transportation services consumers (ROPTU).

At the end of 2003, he worked as an advisor to CJSC Soyuzneftegaz Interstate Oil Company.

Kislyuk was in the top three of the Democratic Party of Russia list in the elections to the State Duma on 7 December 2003.

In September 2004, he headed the council of the Professional Center for Support of Trade Unions and Civil Initiatives.

In the 2000s, nothing was known about Kislyuk's activities. In 2016, it became known that he is teaching and is the scientific secretary of the International University in Moscow.

== Family ==
He is married to Lyubov Anatolyevna, (born 1956), and has two daughters, Polina (born 1978), and Daria (born 1982).

He likes weightlifting, fishing.
