= 1917 in Russia =

- Decades: 1890s; 1900s; 1910s; 1920s; 1930s
- See also: History of Russia; Timeline of Russian history; List of years in Russia

Events from the year 1917 in Russia.

== Incumbents ==
- Monarch – Nicholas II (until March 15), monarchy abolished
- Chairman of Russian Provisional Government – Georgy Lvov (March 15–July 21); Alexander Kerensky (July 21–November 7)
- Chairman of the Council of People's Commissars of the Russian SFSR – Vladimir Lenin (after November 7)

== Events ==
- March 8
  - (N.S.) (February 23, O.S.) – The February Revolution begins: Women calling for bread in Petrograd create riots, which spread throughout the city.
- March 12 – The Duma declares a Provisional Government.
- March 15 (N.S.) (March 2, O.S.) – Emperor Nicholas II of Russia abdicates his and his son's claims. This is considered to be the end of the Russian Empire.
- March 17 (N.S.) (March 4, O.S.) – Grand Duke Michael Alexandrovich of Russia refuses the throne, and power passes to the Provisional Government under Prince Georgy Lvov.
- March 25 – The Georgian Orthodox Church restores the autocephaly abolished in 1811.
- April 8 (N.S.) (March 26, O.S.) – In Petrograd, 40,000 ethnic Estonians demand national autonomy.
- April 12 (N.S.) (March 30 O.S.) – The Autonomous Governorate of Estonia is formed within Russia from the Governorate of Estonia and the Northern part of the Governorate of Livonia.
- April 16
  - (N.S.) (April 3, O.S.) – Vladimir Lenin arrives at the Finland Station in Petrograd.
  - Russian General Brusilov begins the Kerensky Offensive in Galicia, advancing towards Lemberg.
- July 6 – World War I:
- July 16–July 17 – Russian troops mutiny, abandon the Austrian front and retreat to Ukraine; hundreds are shot by their commanding officers during the retreat.
- July 16–July 18 – Clashes in Petrograd in July Days; Lenin escapes to Finland; Trotsky is arrested.
- July 20
  - The Parliament of Finland, with a Social Democratic majority, passes a "Sovereignty Act", declaring itself, as the representative of the Finnish people, sovereign over the Grand Duchy of Finland. The Russian Provisional Government does not recognize the act.
  - (July 7, O.S.) – Alexander Kerensky becomes premier of the Russian Provisional Government.
  - The Russian Provisional Government enacts women's suffrage.
- July 20–July 28 – WWI: Austrian and German forces repulse the Russian advance into Galicia.
- July 30 – The Parliament of Finland is dissolved by the Russian Provisional Government.
- September 14 – Russia is declared a republic by the Provisional Government.
- September 23 – Leon Trotsky is elected Chairman of the Petrograd Soviet.
- September 25 – The Mossovet (Moscow Soviet of People's Deputies) votes to side with the Bolsheviks.
- October 25 (O.S.) (November 7, N.S.) – Traditional beginning date of the October Revolution and Russian Civil War.
- November 5 (N.S.) (October 23, O.S.) – Estonian communists seize power in Tallinn, Autonomous Governorate of Estonia.
  - Militants from Trotsky's committee join with Bolshevik soldiers to seize government buildings and pounce on members of the provisional government.
- November 7
  - (N.S.) (October 25, O.S.) – October Revolution in Russia: The workers of the Petrograd Soviet in Russia, led by the Bolshevik Party and leader Vladimir Lenin, storm the Winter Palace and successfully destroy the Kerensky Provisional Government.
  - Iran refuses to support the Allied Forces after the October Revolution.
  - The Parliament of Finland passes another "Sovereignty Act", dissolving Russian sovereignty over Finland.
- December 6
  - The Senate of Finland officially declares the country's independence from Russia.
- December 20 – The Cheka is established in Russia.
- Following the October Revolution, Alexandra Kollontai is appointed People's Commissar for Social Welfare in the Council of People's Commissars of the Government of the Russian Soviet Federative Socialist Republic, making her the first woman cabinet minister in Europe.

== Arts ==
- Jēkabs Kazaks - Refugees
- Arkady Rylov - Sunset

== Music ==
- Sergei Prokofiev
  - Visions fugitives
  - 5 Poems, Op. 27
- Sergei Rachmaninoff - Études-Tableaux, Op. 39

== Births ==
- 25 January – Ilya Prigogine, Russian-born Belgian physicist, chemist, and recipient of the Nobel Prize in Chemistry (d. 2003)
- 27 February – Laine Mesikäpp, Estonian actress, singer and folk song collector (d. 2012)
- 29 April – Maya Deren, Russian-born American experimental filmmaker (d. 1961)
- 1 May – Fyodor Khitruk, Russian animator (d. 2012)
- 27 November – I. D. Serebryakov, Soviet lexicographer and translator
- 25 December – Arseny Mironov, Russian scientist, engineer and pilot (d. 2019)

== Deaths ==
- February 3 – Alexey Abaza, Russian admiral and politician (b. 1853)
- March 14 – Robert Viren, Imperial Russian Navy admiral (b. 1857)
- May 27 – Yevgeni Ivanovich Alekseyev, Imperial Russian Navy admiral and politician (b. 1843)
- July 15 – Andrey Selivanov, Russian general and politician (b. 1847)
- September 9 – Boris Stürmer, Russian prime minister (b. 1848)
- December 8 – Mendele Mocher Sforim, Russian Yiddish and Hebrew writer (b. 1836)
- December 24 – Ivan Goremykin, Russian prime minister (b. 1839)
- Wladimir Burliuk, Ukrainian artist (b. 1886)
