= 1918 in Russia =

- Decades: 1890s; 1900s; 1910s; 1920s; 1930s
- See also: History of Russia; Timeline of Russian history; List of years in Russia

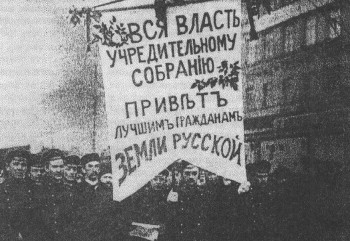
Pro-Constituent Assembly rally poster stating "All power to the Constituent Assembly! Greetings to the best citizens of the Russian land"

Events from the year 1918 in Russia

== Events ==
=== January–March ===
- 1 January - the establishment of the Stavropol Soviet Republic
- 9 January - the creation of the Volunteer Army was officially announced
- 18–19 January - Russian Constituent Assembly held its first and last meeting
- 20 January - lynching of Andrei Shingaryov and Fyodor Kokoshkin, members of the liberal Cadet Party Central Committee, by the revolutionary sailors
- 22 January - Ukrainian People's Republic proclaims its independence
- 23-31 January - 3rd All-Russian Congress of Soviets approved the dissolution of the Constituent Assembly and adopted a resolution "On a new designation of the supreme state power".
- 27 January - Finnish Civil War begins
- 28 January - Communist government issues a decree on the foundation of the Red Army
- 29 January - Battle of Kruty between Ukrainian and Bolshevik forces
- 30 January - Odessa Soviet Republic proclaimed
- 9 February - Ukrainian People's Republic and the Central powers signed the Treaty of Brest-Litovsk
- 14 February - the Gregorian calendar ("new style") was introduced in Bolshevik-controlled areas. After January 31, February 14 immediately followed
- 16 February - Council of Lithuania adopts the act of independence
- 17 February - beginning of the Ice Cruise of the Baltic Fleet, transferring Russian ships from Reval and Helsingfors to Kronstadt
- 21 February - the CPC issues the decree named Socialist Homeland is in Danger!
- 22 February - Ice March of the Volunteer Army begins
- 24 February - Estonian Declaration of Independence
- 3 March - Treaty of Brest-Litovsk between the Soviet Russia and the Central powers
- 11 March - Communist government moves from Petrograd to Moscow
- 25 March - Belarusian People's Republic proclaimed

=== April–June ===
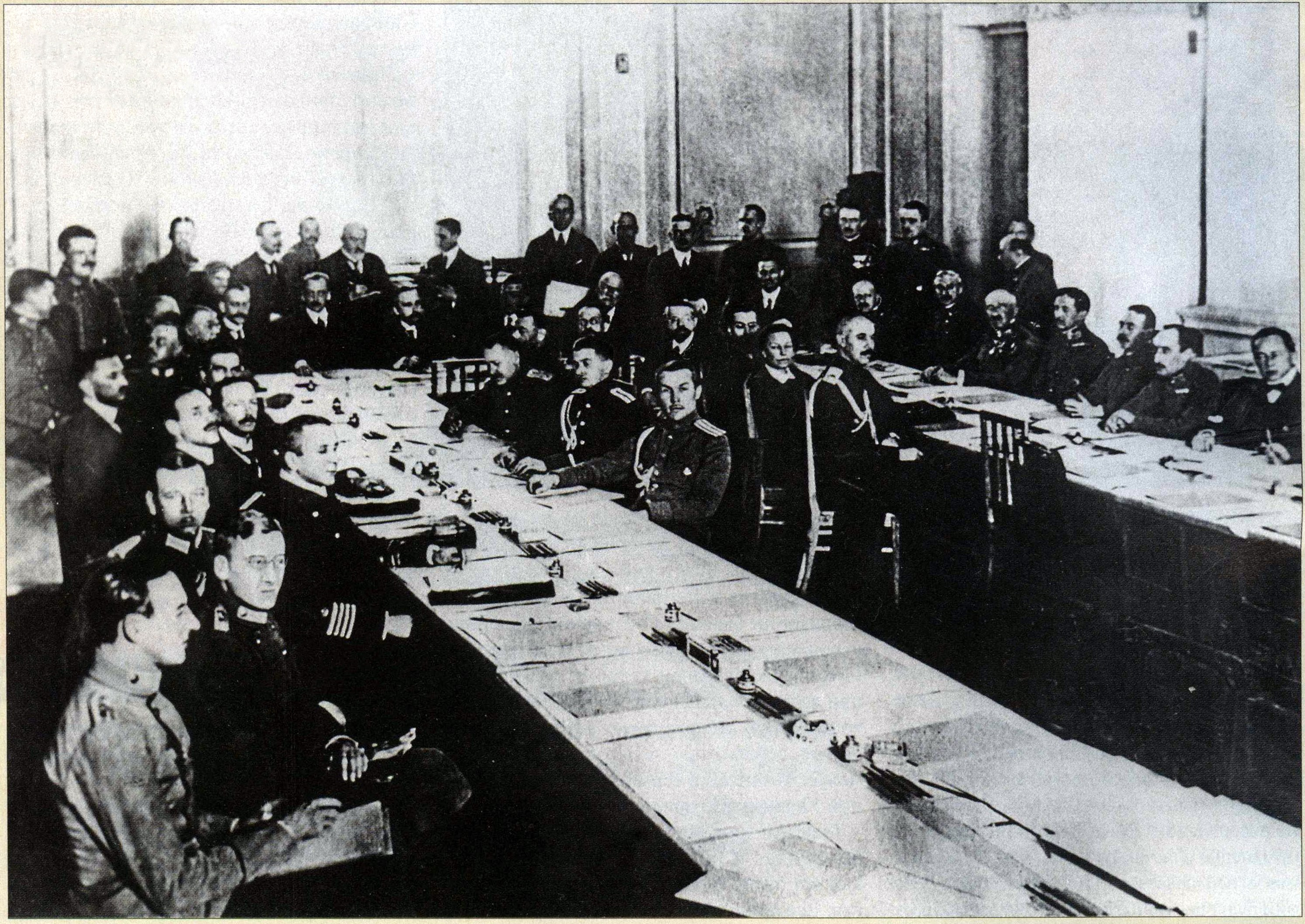
Meeting of negotiating delegations in Brest-Litovsk

- 17 May - beginning of the Revolt of the Czechoslovak Legion
- 8 June - Committee of Members of the Constituent Assembly founded in Samara and declared itself the holder of the supreme power, acting temporarily on behalf of the Assembly
- 11 June - ARCEC approved the decree of the Council of People's Commissars "On the organization and supply of the rural poor" creating the kombeds

=== July–September ===
- 4–10 July - Fifth All–Russian Congress of Soviets
  - 6 July - assassination of German ambassador Wilhelm von Mirbach by Yakov Blumkin precedes the Left SR uprising
  - 10 July - Constitution of the Russian Socialist Federative Soviet Republic adopted by the Congress
- 17 July - execution of the abdicated emperor Nicholas II of Russia and his family performed in Yekaterinburg by the local Bolsheviks
- 2 August - Anglo-American troops landed in Arkhangelsk
- 8 August - beginning of anti-Communist Izhevsk–Votkinsk Uprising
- 30 August - Vladimir Lenin assassination attempt by SR Fanny Kaplan
- 5 September - the CPC proclaims the Red Terror as a response for the Kaplan incident
- 23 September - Ufa Directory, the reformed anti-Bolshevik government, formed in Ufa

=== October–December ===
- 29 October - creation of the Russian Communist Youth League
- 13 November - Bolsheviks renounced the Treaty of Brest-Litovsk two days after Armistice of Compiègne marking defeat of the Central powers in the World War I.
- 18 November - Admiral Alexander Kolchak seizes power from the Ufa Directory which moved to Omsk month before. The council of ministers appointed him to the post of the Supreme Ruler of Russia (chosen to avoid the words "president" and "regent", believing that the form of government will be determined by the Constituent Assembly after the end of the civil war)
- 10 December - Sfatul Țării of Bessarabia decided to join Romania. The Romanian annexation of Bessarabia was never recognized by the Soviet government.

== Births ==
- 9 September - Boris Zakhoder, poet and translator (died 2000)
- 10 December - Anatoly Tarasov, ice hockey player and coach (died 1995)
- 11 December - Aleksandr Solzhenitsyn, writer (died 2008)
- 15 December - Andrey Titenko, soldier (died 2022)
- 1 December – Aleksandr Sokolov (painter, born 1918), Russian painter and art teacher (d. 1973)

== Deaths ==
- 7 February – Alexander Taneyev, Russian composer (b. 1850)
- 1 April – General Paul von Rennenkampf, military commander in Russo-Japanese War and World War I (shot)
- 6 April – Savva Mamontov, businessman and philanthropist
- 13 April – General Lavr Kornilov, Supreme Commander of the Russian Army (1917), one of the leaders of the anti-Communist White Movement
- 28 April – Georgy Bulatsel, Russian military officer (executed) (b. 1875)
- 30 May – Georgi Plekhanov, Russian revolutionary, philosopher and Marxist theoretician (b. 1856)
- 20 June – V. Volodarsky (Moisey Goldstein), Bolsheviks' chief agitator
- 25 June – General Sergey Markov, anti-Communist Volunteer Army leader
- 6 July – Ivan Dmitrievich Sednev and Klimenty Grigorievich Nagorny
- 10 July Ilya Leonidovich Tatischev and Vasily Alexandrovich Dolgorukov
- 17 July – Nicholas II, Alexandra Feodorovna (Alix of Hesse), Grand Duchess Olga Nikolaevna of Russia, Grand Duchess Tatiana Nikolaevna of Russia, Grand Duchess Maria Nikolaevna of Russia, Grand Duchess Anastasia Nikolaevna of Russia, Alexei Nikolaevich, Tsarevich of Russia, Ivan Kharitonov, Alexei Trupp, Anna Demidova, Eugene Botkin
- 18 July – Prince John Konstantinovich of Russia, Prince Constantine Constantinovich of Russia, Prince Igor Constantinovich of Russia, Vladimir Paley
- 22 July – Alexey Schastny, Russian naval officer (b. 1881)
- 30 August – Moisei Uritsky, Bolshevik Revolutionary and chief of the Cheka secret police of the Petrograd Soviet (b. 1873)
- 4 September – Anastasia Hendrikova and Catherine Schneider
- 30 September – Vera Velichkina, physician, writer and revolutionary (b. 1868)
- 4 October – Nikolai Skrydlov, admiral (b. 1844)
- 9 November – Sergey Andreyevsky, Russian writer, poet, literary critic and lawyer (b. 1847)
