= 1993 Russian gubernatorial elections =

- 28 February – 26 December 1993

12 Heads of Federal Subjects from 89
- 1993 Russian regional elections: Gubernatorial Gubernatorial (of another subject) Legislative Legislative (of another subject) Referendum Referendum and gubernatorial Referendum and legislative

Gubernatorial elections in 1993 took place in twelve regions of the Russian Federation.

== Race summary ==
Federal subject	Leadership before election	Election day	Candidates	Result
Ingushetia	Viktor Polyanichko, head of provisional administration	28 February	✓ Ruslan Aushev 99.9% (ran unopposed)	New president elected.
Kalmykia	Ilya Bugdayev, chairman of the Supreme Soviet; Maksim Mukubenov, acting premier	11 April	✓ Kirsan Ilyumzhinov 65.37%; Valery Ochirov 29.22%	New president elected.
Krasnoyarsk Krai	Arkady Veprev (resigned); Valery Zubov (acting)	11 April (first round)	Valery Zubov 51.33% (Note: Won majority of the votes cast but less than 25% of eligible voters as was required by local law.); Valery Sergiyenko 16.41%; Pyotr Romanov 10.91%	Acting governor elected for a full term.
Krasnoyarsk Krai	Arkady Veprev (resigned); Valery Zubov (acting)	25 April (runoff)	✓ Valery Zubov 73.12%; Valery Sergiyenko 19.01%	Acting governor elected for a full term.
Amur Oblast	Albert Krivchenko	11 April (first round)	Aleksandr Surat 34.76%; Nikolay Kolyadinsky 30.42%; Boris Vinogradov 7.49%; Albert Krivchenko 6.03%; Boris Kashpura 5.69%; Aleksandr Sadovsky 5.64%	Incumbent lost election. New governor elected.
Amur Oblast	Albert Krivchenko	25 April (runoff)	✓ Aleksandr Surat 52.91%; Nikolay Kolyadinsky 44.56%	Incumbent lost election. New governor elected.
Bryansk Oblast	Vladimir Barabanov	11 April (first round)	Vladimir Barabanov 33.82%; Yury Lodkin (CPRF) 29.30%; Pyotr Shirshov 9.35%	Incumbent lost election. New governor elected.
Bryansk Oblast	Vladimir Barabanov	25 April (runoff)	✓ Yury Lodkin (CPRF) 51.41%; Vladimir Barabanov 44.89%	Incumbent lost election. New governor elected.
Chelyabinsk Oblast	Vadim Solovyov	11 April (first round)	Pyotr Sumin 58.39%; Vladimir Grigoriadi 6.36%; Viktor Radionov 4.82%; Vladimir Golovlyov 4.76%; Against all 6.80%	Incumbent did not stand for election. New governor elected. Disputed government.
Chelyabinsk Oblast	Vadim Solovyov	25 April (runoff)	✓ Pyotr Sumin 48.19%; Vladimir Grigoriadi 35.39%; Against all 9.50%	Incumbent did not stand for election. New governor elected. Disputed government.
Lipetsk Oblast	Gennady Kuptsov (removed); Vladimir Zaytsev (acting)	11 April	✓ Mikhail Narolin 49.82%; Vitaly Bezrukov 7.79%; Vladimir Zaytsev 5.28%; Gennady Kuptsov 4.81%	Acting governor lost election. New governor elected.
Oryol Oblast	Nikolay Yudin	11 April	✓ Yegor Stroyev 52.87%; Nikolay Yudin 34.18%; Vladimir Reshetnikov 6.9%	Incumbent lost election. New governor elected.
Penza Oblast	Aleksandr Kondratyev	11 April	✓ Anatoly Kovlyagin 70.97%; Mikhail Durasov 6.68%; Aleksandr Kondratyev 2.56%	Incumbent lost election. New governor elected.
Smolensk Oblast	Valery Fateyev	25 April	✓ Anatoly Glushenkov 41.2%; Valery Fateyev 30.5%; A. Bogdanovich 8.2%	Incumbent lost election. New governor elected.
Bashkortostan	Murtaza Rakhimov, chairman of the Supreme Soviet; Anatoly Kopsov, premier	12 December	✓ Murtaza Rakhimov 64.01%; Rafis Kadyrov 28.45%	New president elected.
Chuvashia	Eduard Kubarev, chairman of the Supreme Soviet; Valeryan Viktorov, premier	12 December (first round)	Nikolay Fyodorov 24.90%; Lev Kurakov 21.86%; Valeryan Viktorov 18.08%; Vladimir Fyodorov 10.38%; Atner Khuzangai 6.27%	New president elected.
Chuvashia	Eduard Kubarev, chairman of the Supreme Soviet; Valeryan Viktorov, premier	26 December (runoff)	✓ Nikolay Fyodorov 55.06%; Lev Kurakov 38.80%	New president elected.

Following the escalation of 1993 Russian constitutional crisis the governors had to choose whether to support the parliament or the president. Those who chose the losing side, were later removed from office by the president. Among them were governors of Amur and Bryansk Oblasts Aleksandr Surat and Yury Lodkin, both serving only six months.

== Bryansk Oblast ==
1993 Bryansk Oblast gubernatorial election
- 11 April 1993 (first round); 25 April 1993 (second round)
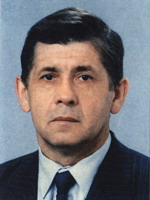

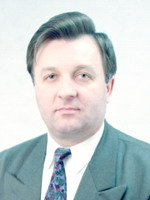
Candidate	Yury Lodkin	Vladimir Barabanov
Party	CPRF	Independent
Popular vote	382,707	334,153
Percentage	51.41%	44.89%
Head of Administration before election
Vladimir Barabanov
Elected Head of Administration
Yury Lodkin

The 1993 Bryansk Oblast gubernatorial election was held on 11 April 1993. Incumbent head of administration Vladimir Barabanov ran to defend his seat against a field of 13 candidates. As none of them won the majority, a second round was held on 25 April 1993 between Barabanov and people's deputy of Russia, journalist Yury Lodkin, who won with 51.41% of the vote.

In January 1992, people's deputy of Russia Vladimir Barabanov was appointed governor by Russian president Boris Yeltsin in spite of Bryansk Oblast Council resolution proposing to appoint then-executive committee chairman Vasily Polskoy instead. As a result, Barabanov's legitimacy was dubious. The election was called by the Council in December 1992, after the end of a country-wide local election moratorium. In the first round, held on 11 April 1993, Barabanov was leading with 33.82% of the vote; among opposition candidates were two of his former deputies as well as some former potential candidates for appointment, including Vasily Polskoy, general Pyotr Shirshov and people's deputy Fyodor Gosporyan. In the second round, most of the losing candidates backed the runner-up, Itar-Tass reporter and people's deputy Yury Lodkin, who then went on to win by a relatively narrow margin.

Although many of newly elected governors tended to side with the anti-reformist left-wing forces, Lodkin was the only one of them to openly state his membership in the recently re-created Communist Party as well as his opposition to federal government and its policies. In late September 1993, Lodkin, who criticized president Yeltsin's decision to dissolve the Congress of People's Deputies of Russia, was removed from office by an executive order which was later declared illegal by court.

=== Results ===
1993 Bryansk Oblast gubernatorial election
Candidate	First round		Second round	
Candidate	Votes	%	Votes	%
Yury Lodkin	178,067	29.30	382,707	51.41
Vladimir Barabanov	205,594	33.82	334,153	44.89
Pyotr Shirshov	56,855	9.35		
Anatoly Konovalov	24,390	4.01		
Vasily Polskoy	22,837	3.76		
Nikolay Rudenok	19,506	3.21		
Fyodor Gosporyan	15,596	2.57		
Viktor Leskov	11,827	1.95		
Nikolay Osipov	6,974	1.15		
Nikolay Novikov	6,056	1.00		
Nikolay Filippov	4,296	0.71		
Nikolay Isayev	3,762	0.62		
Aleksandr Nemets	2,941	0.48		
Vladimir Lavrenov	2,646	0.44		
Against all	18,507	3.04	10,588	1.42
Invalid ballots	27,964	4.60	16,992	2.28
Total	607,818	100	744,440	100
Registered voters/turnout	1,085,552	55.99	1,093,370	68.09

== Chelyabinsk Oblast ==
1993 Chelyabinsk Oblast gubernatorial election
- 11 April 1993 (first round); 25 April 1993 (second round)
- Turnout: 58.4% (second round)
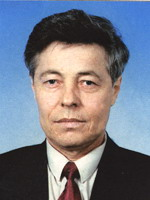

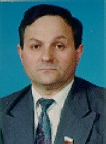
Candidate	Pyotr Sumin	Vladimir Grigoriadi
Popular vote	748,826	549,919
Percentage	48.19%	35.39%
Head of Administration before election
Vadim Solovyov
Elected Head of Administration
Disputed government

The 1993 Chelyabinsk Oblast gubernatorial election was held on 11 April 1993, after a no confidence motion in governor Vadim Solovyov was passed by the Chelyabinsk Oblast Council of People's Deputies. Solovyov was appointed by the president of Russia in October 1991, ignoring the Council's proposal to appoint its chairman Pyotr Sumin instead.

To win in the election, a candidate needed to obtain more than 50% of the votes cast and more than 25% of all registered voters. As none of the candidates met the requirements (partially due to low voter turnout), a second round was held on 25 April, concurrently with the 1993 Russian government referendum. Pyotr Sumin won in the second round with 48.19% of the vote over Miass mayor Vladimir Grigoriadi (35.38%) and was sworn in on 10 June 1993. Solovyov did not stand for election and unsuccessfully challenged the Council's decision to hold it in courts. After the election, Sumin received support and recognition from the Supreme Soviet of Russia and the Constitutional Court, while Solovyov administration was backed by president Boris Yeltsin. The dispute ended in October 1993, when Solovyov ordered to dissolve the Council of People's Deputies and Sumin lost his main source of support.

=== Results ===
1993 Chelyabinsk Oblast gubernatorial election
Candidate	First round		Second round	
Candidate	Votes	%	Votes	%
Pyotr Sumin	482,130	58.39	748,826	48.19
Vladimir Grigoriadi	52,592	6.36	549,919	35.39
Viktor Radionov	39,783	4.82		
Vladimir Golovlyov	39,332	4.76		
Valentin Buravlyov	27,449	3.32		
Oleg Knyazev	23,615	2.86		
Sergey Kostromin	21,210	2.57		
Pavel Moderau	17,764	2.15		
Vitaly Knyaginichev	12,514	1.52		
Against all	56,116	6.80	147,575	9.50
Invalid ballots	53,270	6.45	107,581	6.92
Total	825,775	100	1,553,901	100
Registered voters/turnout	2,624,683	31.46	2,662,793	58.36

== Chuvashia ==
1993 Chuvash presidential election
- 12 December 1993 (first round); 26 December 1993 (second round)
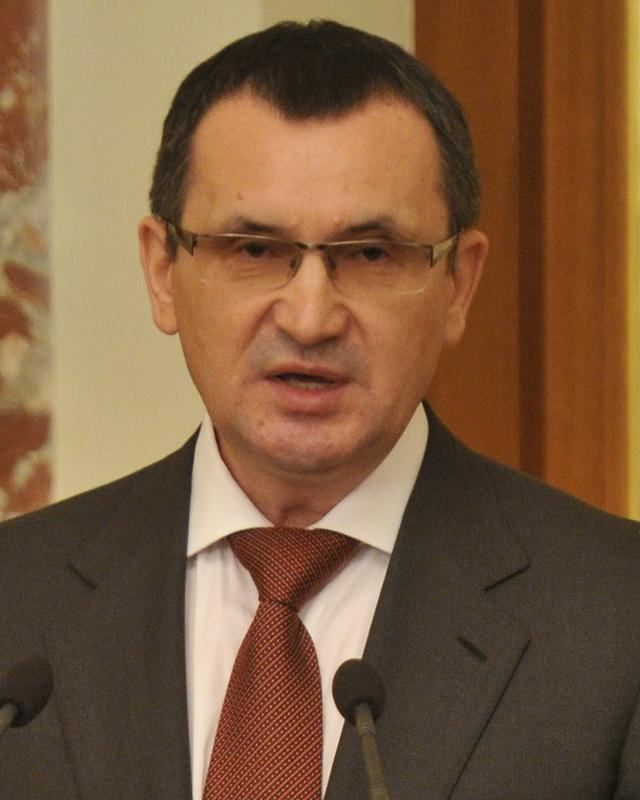

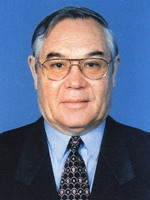
Candidate	Nikolay Fyodorov	Lev Kurakov
Running mate	Enver Ablyakimov	Boris Yakovlev
Popular vote	269,284	189,769
Percentage	55.06%	38.80%
Chairman of the Supreme Soviet (Note: Parliamentary speaker and nominal head of state.) before election
Eduard Kubarev
Elected president
Nikolay Fyodorov

Presidential election was held in the Chuvash Republic on 12 December 1993, two years after the unsuccessful 1991 election. Since none of the seven candidates received the required majority, a second round took place on 26 December. Former justice minister of Russia Nikolay Fyodorov was elected president with 55% of the vote, defeating university chief executive Lev Kurakov. Fyodorov was sworn in on 21 January 1994.

=== Candidates ===
- Nikolay Fyodorov, minister of justice of Russia (1990–93), DPR party-list candidate in the concurrent State Duma election (won seat, declined to take)
  - Enver Ablyakimov, member of the Supreme Soviet of Chuvashia, construction executive
- Vladimir Fyodorov, director of Chuvash territorial branch of the State Anti-Monopoly Committee of Russia
  - Yevgeny Yaransky, collective farm chairman
- Leonid Ivanov, head of department, Chuvash State University
  - Nikolay Malchugin, prosecutor of Novocheboksarsk
- Atner Khuzangai, member of the Supreme Soviet of Chuvashia, leader of the Chuvash National Congress, nominal winner of the 1991 election
  - Vasily Antonov, entrepreneur
- Eduard Kubarev, chairman of the Supreme Soviet of Chuvashia, 1991 candidate
  - Vladimir Kirgizov, construction executive
- Lev Kurakov, rector of the Chuvash State University, member of the Supreme Soviet of Chuvashia, candidate in the concurrent Federation Council election (won seat)
  - Boris Yakovlev, first deputy chairman of the Supreme Soviet of Chuvashia
- Valeryan Viktorov, chairman of the Council of Ministers of Chuvashia (1992–94), candidate in the concurrent Federation Council election (won seat)
  - Leonid Prokopyev, chairman of the State Committee for Ethnic Affairs of Russia (1990–91), chairman of the Council of Ministers of the Chuvash ASSR (1975–89), 1991 election runner-up

Withdrew

- Nadezhda Bikalova, economist (ran for State Duma, won seat)

=== Results ===
1993 Chuvash presidential election
Candidate	Running mate	First round		Second round	
Candidate	Running mate	Votes	%	Votes	%
Nikolay Fyodorov	Enver Ablyakimov	147,475	24.90	269,284	55.06
Lev Kurakov	Boris Yakovlev	129,486	21.86	189,769	38.80
Valeryan Viktorov	Leonid Prokopyev	107,070	18.08		
Vladimir Fyodorov	Yevgeny Yaransky	61,482	10.38		
Atner Khuzangai	Vasily Antonov	37,139	6.27		
Eduard Kubarev	Vladimir Kirgizov	22,002	3.71		
Leonid Ivanov	Nikolay Malchugin	4,333	0.73		
Against all		33,532	5.66		4.68
Invalid ballots		49,836	8.41		1.45
Total		592,355	100	489,066	100
Eligible voters/turnout			62.3		52.03

== Ingushetia ==
1993 Ingush presidential election
- 28 February 1993
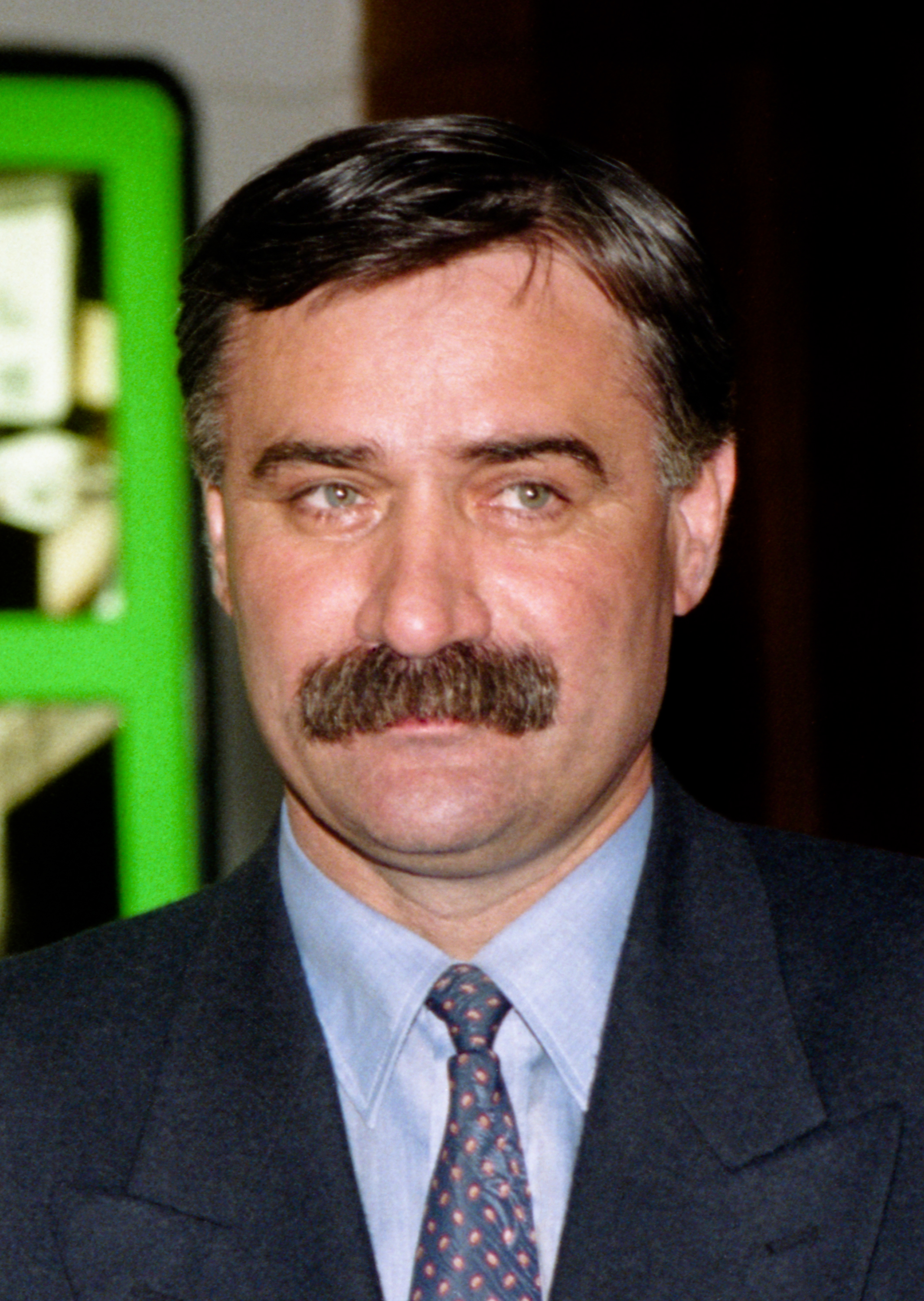
Candidate	Ruslan Aushev
Party	Independent
Alliance	Union of National Accord: Congress of the Ingush People; National Front of Ingushetia; Nijsxo; Union for Orstkhoy Revival; Union of Officers of Ingushetia; Union of Women of Ingushetia
Running mate	Boris Agapov
Percentage	99.94%

On 28 February 1993, presidential elections were held in Ingushetia. Major General Ruslan Aushev, formerly head of provisional administration of Ingushetia, ran unopposed with the support of several Ingush nationalist organisations. He was sworn in as president on 7 March 1993. A snap election was held a year after, along with the constitutional referendum and election of the People's Assembly.

The primary political issue of the election was the 1992 East Prigorodny conflict and the subsequent ethnic cleansing of Ingush in Prigorodny District. All of the groups supporting Aushev urged for further attention towards Ingush refugees, but disagreed on the republic's future relationship towards Russia; the National Front of Ingushetia, a party comprising supporters of Aushev's campaign, supported a takeover of Prigorodny District by the Russian federal government, while Nijsxo and the Congress of the Ingush People urged for a reassessment of the relationship. The Congress of the Ingush People called for the withdrawal of all Russian troops from Ingushetia, and Nijsxo would go on to oppose the signing of the Treaty of Federation after Aushev took office.

Following the election, Aushev signed a decree on 7 March 1993 banning all political organisations in Ingushetia.

== Kalmykia ==
1993 Kalmyk presidential election
- 11 April 1993
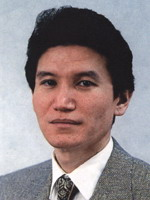

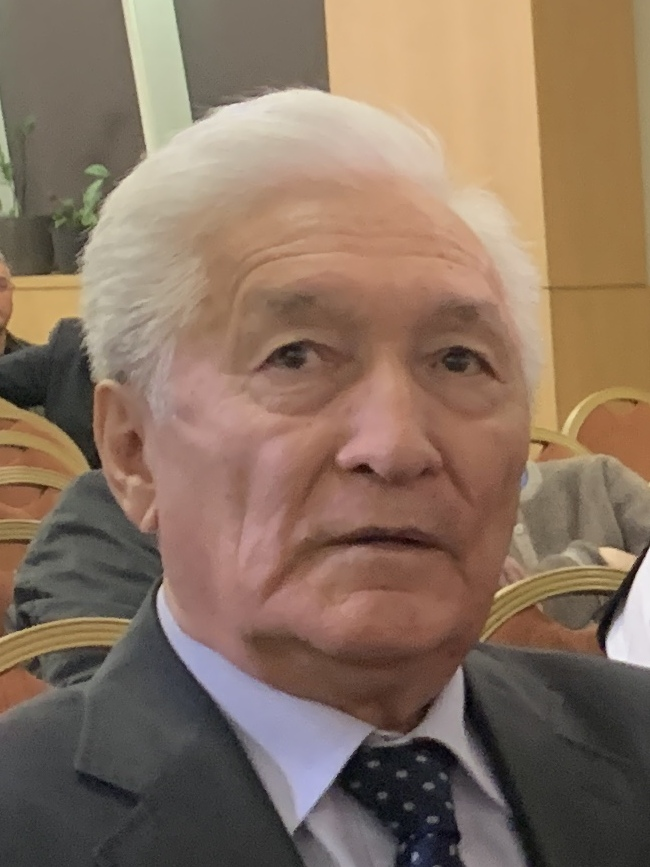
Candidate	Kirsan Ilyumzhinov	Valery Ochirov
Party	Independent	Independent
Running mate	Valery Bogdanov	Nina Kalyuzhnaya
Percentage	65.37%	29.22%
- Winner by district: Kirsan Ilyumzhinov Valery Ochirov
Chairman of the Supreme Soviet before election
Ilya Bugdayev
Elected president
Kirsan Ilyumzhinov

Presidential election in the Republic of Kalmykia was held on Sunday, 11 April 1993, 17 months after the previous voting of 1991, which did not reveal the winner. People's deputy of Russia Kirsan Ilyumzhinov won the presidency with 65.37% of the vote, defeating deputy commander of Russia's army aviation General Valery Ochirov (29.22%) and president of the Farmers Association of Kalmykia Vladimir Bambayev (1.55%). Aged 31, Ilyumzhinov became the youngest holder of governor-level office in Russia.

After the power struggle between Supreme Soviet speaker Vladimir Basanov and premier Batyr Mikhailov ended with their simultaneous resignation in 1992, the government of Kalmykia was effectively paralysed. During the campaign Ilyumzhinov and Ochirov quickly emerged as frontrunners, both outsiders to local politics in contrast to unpopular career politicians. Ilyumzhinov's candidacy was supported by a coalition of Kalmyk nationalists, anti-communist reformists and Cossacks. Around 80% of eligible voters took part in the election, although as many as 80,000 Soviet-era settlers from Chechnya and Dagestan were disenfranchised from voting. Ilyumzhinov was sworn in as president on 23 April 1993.

Results of the 1993 Kalmyk presidential election
Candidate	Running mate	Votes	%
Kirsan Ilyumzhinov	Valery Bogdanov		65.37
Valery Ochirov	Nina Kalyuzhnaya		29.22
Vladimir Bambayev	A. V. Lavrov		1.55
Total			100
Registered voters/turnout			81.97

== Lipetsk Oblast ==
1993 Lipetsk Oblast gubernatorial election
- 11 April 1993
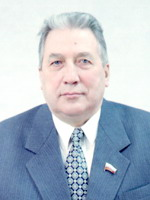
Candidate	Mikhail Narolin
Party	Independent
Popular vote	262,833
Percentage	49.83%
Head of Administration before election
Vladimir Zaytsev (acting)
Elected Head of Administration
Mikhail Narolin

The 1993 Lipetsk Oblast gubernatorial election was held on 11 April 1993 to determine the Head of Administration of Lipetsk Oblast. First deputy head of administration Mikhail Narolin won the election with 49.83% of the vote.

The election was called by the Lipetsk Oblast Council of People's Deputies after then-governor Gennady Kuptsov was sacked by president Boris Yeltsin in December 1992. Kuptsov, an anti-communist Democratic Russia councilor, was little known before his appointment in late 1991. In the following year, the Kuptsov administration received criticism from the Council for incompetence during a period of a sharp decline in the economy. After losing two no confidence votes in the Council, Kuptsov was removed from office by president Yeltsin and replaced by one of his deputies, fellow Democrat Vladimir Zaytsev.

On the election day, first deputy governor Mikhail Narolin emerged as the strongest candidate, leaving far behind both Zaytsev and Kuptsov. Before the election Narolin, a former high-ranking official in the Lipetsk Oblast executive committee, was seen by many as the de-facto governor, although he distanced himself from the "democratic" wing of the administration. His 49.8% of the vote was enough to win in the first round, as he secured more than 1/4 of all eligible voters in the region. As was the law at that time, Narolin was sworn in immediately after the results were announced by the election commission. After the election, second place winner Vitaly Bezrukov claimed that Narolin's win was fraudulent. The court rejected Bezrukov's claim to annull the election but it was confirmed that of 263,000 votes for Narolin, at least 6,000 were falsified.

=== Candidates ===
- Aleksandr Abramov, deputy chairman of Lipetsk Oblast state property committee
- Vladimir Betenekov, leader of Democratic Party of Russia in Lipetsk Oblast
- Vitaly Bezrukov, deputy chairman of Lipetsk Oblast state property committee
- Aleksey Burtsev, head of Khlevensky District administration
- Valentin Dmitriyevsky, leader of People's Party "Free Russia" in Lipetsk Oblast
- Aleksandr Kholin, doctor
- Aleksandr Korobeynikov, head of administration of the Oktyabrsky City District of Lipetsk
- Viktor Krysanov, deputy head of MVD directorate for Lipetsk Oblast
- Gennady Kuptsov, former head of administration of Lipetsk Oblast
- Mikhail Narolin, first deputy head of administration of Lipetsk Oblast
- Vladimir Nikonov, director of Gryazi cultivator factory
- Ivan Shatskikh, chairman of Lipetsk Oblast state property committee
- Vladimir Zaytsev, acting head of administration of Lipetsk Oblast

=== Results ===
1993 Lipetsk Oblast gubernatorial election
Candidate	Votes	%
Mikhail Narolin	262,833	49.83
Vitaly Bezrukov	41,128	7.80
Vladimir Zaytsev	27,904	5.29
Gennady Kuptsov	25,424	4.82
Aleksey Burtsev	24,150	4.58
Ivan Shatskikh	24,079	4.56
Valentin Dmitriyevsky	13,739	2.60
Viktor Krysanov	13,154	2.49
Vladimir Nikonov	11,891	2.25
Aleksandr Korobeynikov	10,630	2.02
Aleksandr Kholin	8,762	1.66
Aleksandr Abramov	7,170	1.36
Vladimir Betenekov	4,720	0.89
Against all	22,294	4.23
Invalid ballots	29,629	5.62
Total	527,507	100
Registered voters/turnout	915,853	57.60

== Sources ==
- Ivanov, Vitaly (2019). Глава субъекта Российской Федерации. История губернаторов [Head of the subject of the Russian Federation. History of governors] (in Russian). ISBN 978-5-907250-14-7.
- Kynev, Alexander (2020). Губернаторы в России: между выборами и назначениями [Governors in Russia: Between Elections and Appointments] (in Russian). ISBN 978-5-903135-68-4.
