= 2024 Lipetsk Oblast gubernatorial election =

Election

- 6–8 September 2024
- Turnout: 57.27%
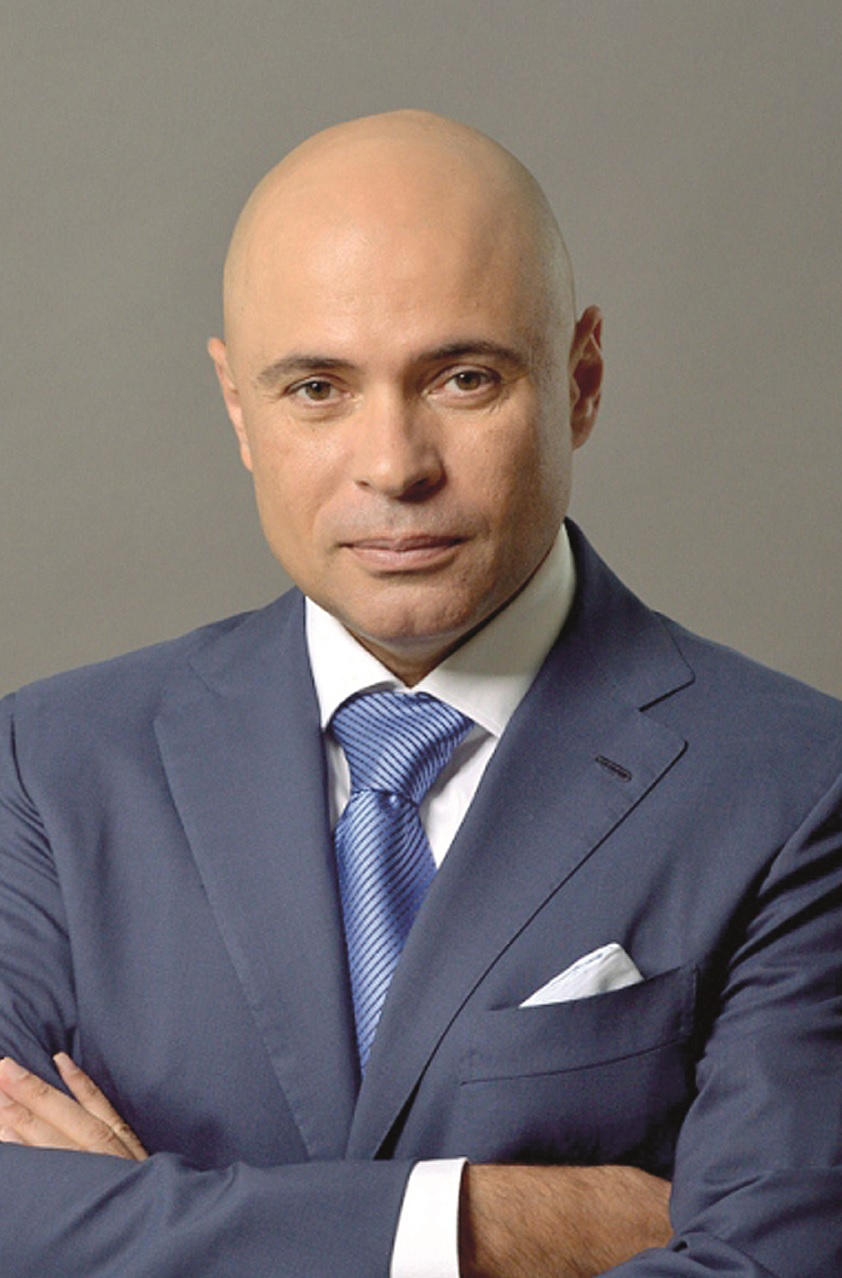
		LDPR	CPCR
Candidate	Igor Artamonov	Anatoly Yemelyanov	Yury Loginov
Party	United Russia	LDPR	Communists of Russia
Popular vote	414,840	30,370	27,489
Percentage	81.16%	5.94%	5.38%
Governor before election
Igor Artamonov
United Russia
Governor-elect
Igor Artamonov
United Russia

The 2024 Lipetsk Oblast gubernatorial election took place on 6–8 September 2024, on common election day. Incumbent Governor Igor Artamonov was re-elected to a second term in office.

== Background ==
Then-Sberbank vice president Igor Artamonov was appointed acting Governor of Lipetsk Oblast in October 2018, replacing five-term Governor Oleg Korolyov, who resigned at his own request. Korolyov led Lipetsk Oblast since 1998 and at the time of his resignation was the third-longest serving governor in Russia (behind Yevgeny Savchenko in Belgorod Oblast and Anatoly Artamonov in Kaluga Oblast). In November 2018 Artamonov appointed his predecessor, Oleg Korolyov, to the Federation Council after incumbent senator Iraida Tikhonova stepped down, however, Senator Yury Volkov, a Rules committee member, questioned the constitutionality of such appointment.

Artamonov, officially an independent, was nominated for a full term by United Russia in the 2019 gubernatorial elections. Igor Artamonov won the September 2019 election with 67.28% of the vote, as his nearest challenger, Sergey Tokarev (CPRF), received 20.03%, although Artamonov's more notable challengers, Lipetsk Oblast Council of Deputies member Oleg Khomutinnikov (PARNAS) and State Duma member Aleksandr Sherin (LDPR), failed to qualify. In March 2020 Governor Artamonov officially joined United Russia party.

== Candidates ==
In Lipetsk Oblast candidates for Governor can be nominated only by registered political parties. Candidate for Governor of Lipetsk Oblast should be a Russian citizen and at least 30 years old. Candidates for Governor should not have a foreign citizenship or residence permit. Each candidate in order to be registered is required to collect at least 6% of signatures of members and heads of municipalities. Also gubernatorial candidates present 3 candidacies to the Federation Council and election winner later appoints one of the presented candidates.

=== Declared ===
Candidate name, political party		Occupation	Status	Ref.
Igor Artamonov; United Russia	Igor Artamonov	Incumbent Governor of Lipetsk Oblast (2018–present)	Registered	
Larisa Ksenofontova; SR–ZP		Member of Lipetsk Oblast Council of Deputies (2011–present); 2019 gubernatorial candidate	Registered	
Yury Loginov; Communists of Russia		Member of Lipetsk Oblast Council of Deputies (2021–present)	Registered	
Polina Valentinova; New People		Individual entrepreneur	Registered	
Anatoly Yemelyanov; Liberal Democratic Party		Member of Lipetsk Oblast Council of Deputies (2021–present)	Registered	
Sergey Tokarev; Communist Party		Member of Lipetsk Oblast Council of Deputies (2011–present); 2019 gubernatorial candidate	Failed to qualify	

=== Eliminated at convention ===
- Roman Chentsov (United Russia), Head of Lebedyansky District (2022–2024) (elected Head of Lipetsk in June 2024)

=== Candidates for Federation Council ===
Incumbent Senator Oksana Khlyakina (United Russia) was not renominated.

Gubernatorial candidate, political party	Candidates for Federation Council	Status
Igor Artamonov; United Russia	* Yelena Goncharova, Director of the RANEPA Lipetsk branch (2023–present) * Igor Kremnyov, Deputy Governor of Lipetsk Oblast (2021–present) * Yevgenia Uvarkina, Deputy Governor of Lipetsk Oblast (2024–present), former mayor of Lipetsk (2019–2024)	Registered
Larisa Ksenofontova; SR–ZP	* Yevdokia Bychkova, Member of Lipetsk City Council of Deputies (2015–2020, 2021–present), former Member of State Duma (2011–2015) * Tatyana Iligorskaya, aide to Larisa Ksenofontova * Vadim Yegorov, criminology associate professor	Registered
Yury Loginov; Communists of Russia	* Valentina Khromovskaya (CPRF), Member of Lipetsk Oblast Council of Deputies (2021–present) * Ruslan Magomedov, traumatologist * Oleg Tokarev, former Member of Lipetsk Oblast Electoral Commission (2021–2023)	Registered
Polina Valentinova; New People	* Alina Bodrova, self-employed * Aleksey Kalinichev, businessman * Vazgen Kukanyants, individual entrepreneur	Registered
Anatoly Yemelyanov; Liberal Democratic Party	* Yury Basharimov, humanities associate professor * Marina Razdobarina, school principal * Marina Repnikova, community activist	Registered
Sergey Tokarev; Communist Party	* Tatyana Kopylova, Member of Lipetsk Oblast Council of Deputies (2011–present), aide to State Duma member Georgy Kamnev * Vitaly Pikalov, Member of Lipetsk Oblast Council of Deputies (2021–present), farmer * Nikolay Razvorotnev, Member of Lipetsk Oblast Council of Deputies (2006–2007, 2016–present), former Member of State Duma (2007–2016), 2014 gubernatorial candidate	Failed to qualify

== Finances ==
All sums are in rubles.

Financial Report	Source	Artamonov	Ksenofontova	Loginov	Tokarev	Valentinova	Yemelyanov
First		2,000,000	25,000	25,000	20,400	25,000	222,000
Final		38,970,568	74,200	555,000	20,400	182,000	1,203,250

== Results ==
Summary of the 6–8 September 2024 Lipetsk Oblast gubernatorial election results
Candidate	Party	Votes	%
Igor Artamonov (incumbent)	United Russia	414,840	81.16
Anatoly Yemelyanov	Liberal Democratic Party	30,370	5.94
Yury Loginov	Communists of Russia	27,489	5.38
Larisa Ksenofontova	A Just Russia – For Truth	18,282	3.58
Polina Valentinova	New People	12,721	2.49
Valid votes		503,702	98.55
Blank ballots		7,406	1.45
Total		511,108	100.00
Turnout		511,108	57.27
Registered voters		892,480	100.00

Governor Artamonov appointed Deputy Governor Yevgenia Uvarkina (Independent) to the Federation Council, replacing incumbent Senator Oksana Khlyakina (United Russia).

== See also ==
- 2024 Russian regional elections
