= 2026 Lipetsk Oblast legislative election =

Regional legislative election in Russia

- 18–20 September 2026

All 36 seats in the Council of Deputies 19 seats needed for a majority
- Turnout: 53.46% ▲1.71 pp
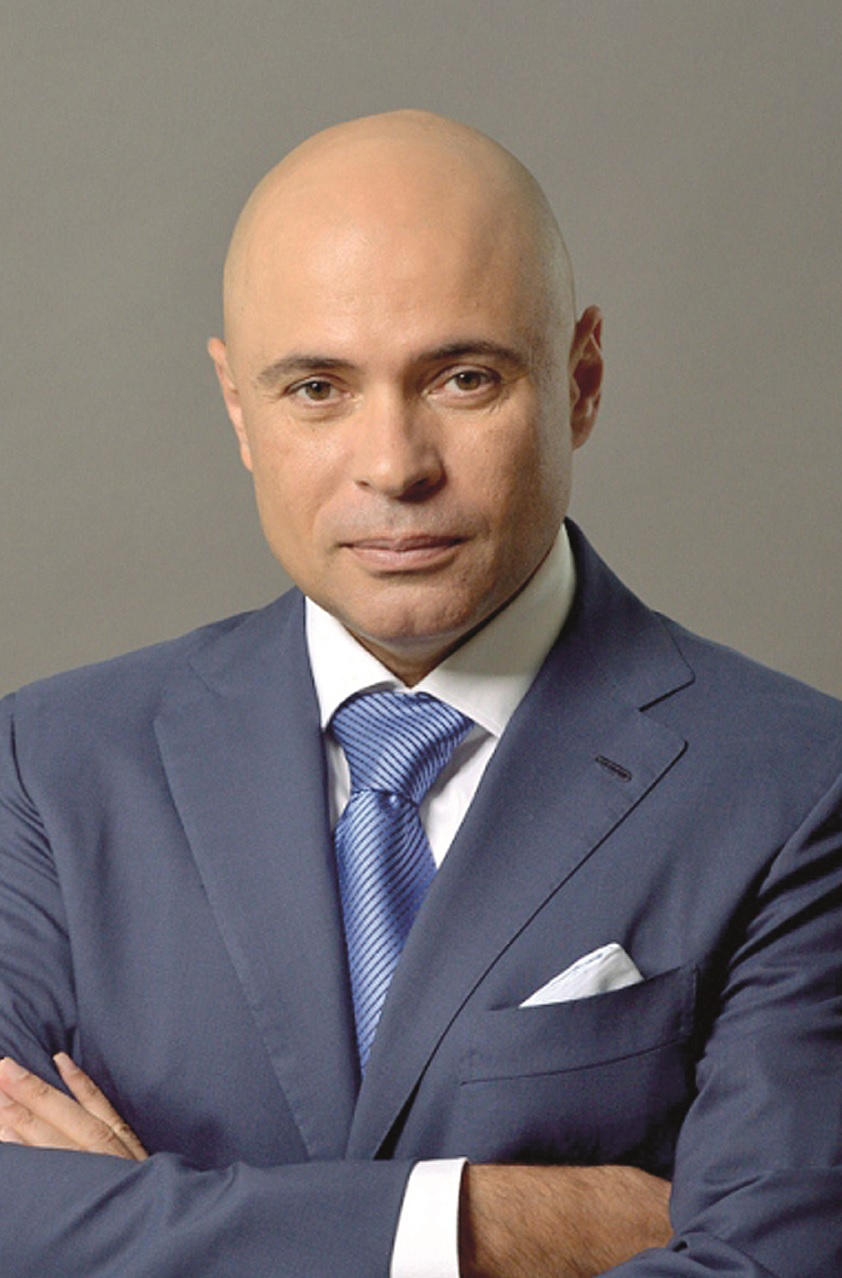

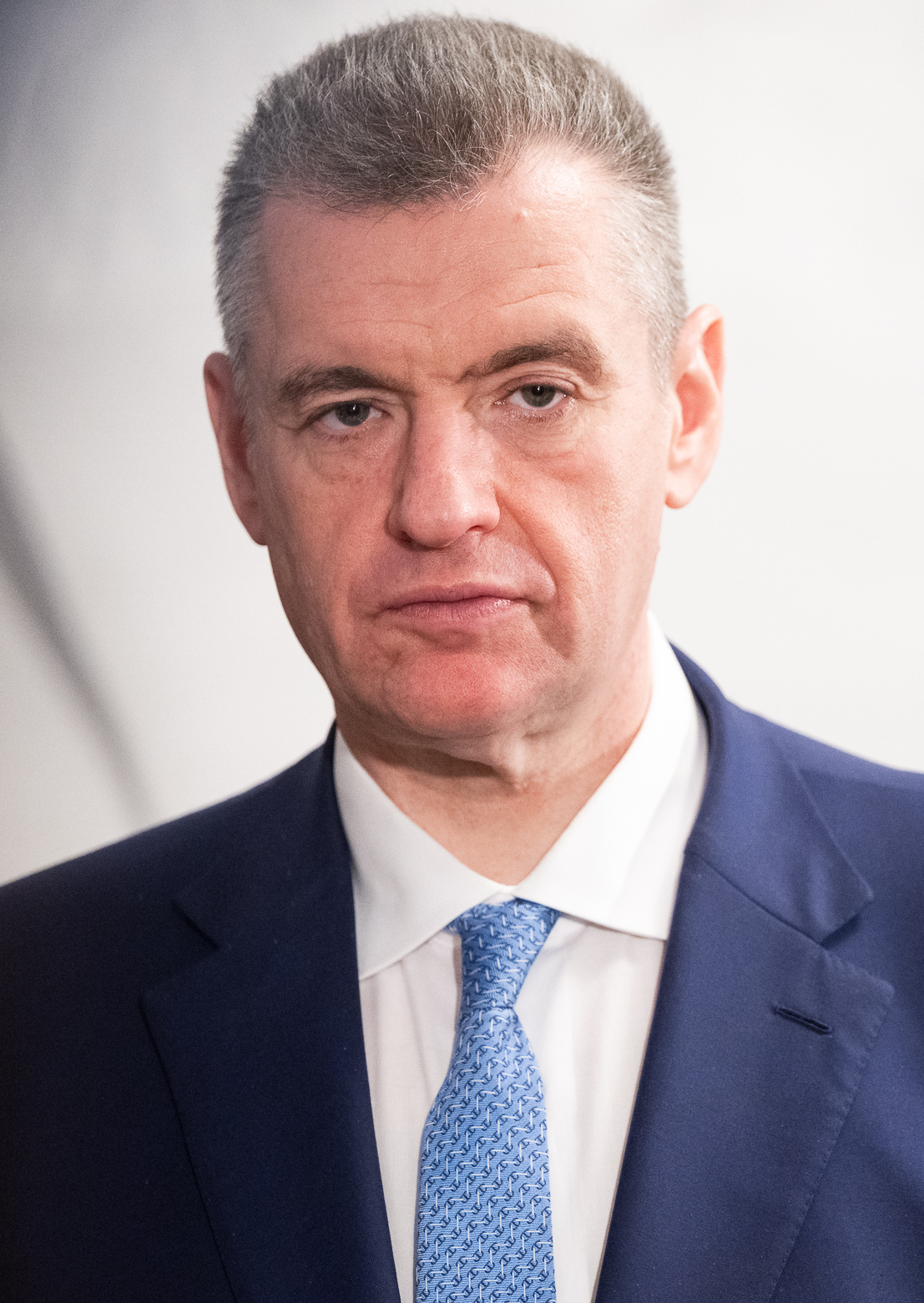
	Majority party	Minority party	Third party
		CPRF
Candidate	Igor Artamonov	Sergey Tokarev	Leonid Slutsky
Party	United Russia	CPRF	LDPR
Last election	46.42%, 23 seats	19.67%, 15 seats	8.25%, 1 seat
Seats won	28	4	1
Seat change	▲5	▼11	Steady
Popular vote	230,514	83,769	44,177
Percentage	49.44%	17.97%	9.48%
Swing	▲3.02 pp	▼1.70 pp	▲1.23 pp
	Fourth party	Fifth party	Sixth party
	NL	SR	RPPSS
Candidate	Roman Khokhlenkov	Larisa Ksenofontova	Sergey Volobuyev
Party	New People	A Just Russia	Party of Pensioners
Last election	5.10%, 1 seat	6.43%, 1 seat	5.22%, 1 seat
Seats won	1	1	1
Seat change	Steady	Steady	Steady
Popular vote	39,495	24,444	23,868
Percentage	8.47%	5.24%	5.12%
Swing	▲3.37 pp	▼1.19 pp	▼0.10 pp
Chairman before election
Vladimir Serikov
United Russia
Elected Chairman
Vladimir Serikov
United Russia
Senator before election
Maksim Kavdzharadze
United Russia
Senator after election
Yevgeny Savvin
United Russia

The 2026 Lipetsk Oblast Council of Deputies election took place on 18–20 September 2026, on common election day, coinciding with the 2026 Russian legislative election. All 36 seats in the Council of Deputies were up for re-election.

United Russia increased its majority in the Council of Deputies, winning 49.4% of the vote and 25 constituencies. Communist Party of the Russian Federation suffered major defeat, losing 11 of its previous 15 seats, mostly in single-mandate constituencies. Liberal Democratic Party of Russia and New People increased their vote share, while A Just Russia and Russian Party of Pensioners for Social Justice barely crossed the 5% threshold, retaining their factions.

== Electoral system ==
Under current election laws, the Council of Deputies is elected for a term of five years, with parallel voting. 9 seats are elected by party-list proportional representation with a 5% electoral threshold (down from 14 seats in 2021), with the other part elected in 27 single-member constituencies by first-past-the-post voting (down from 28 seats in 2021). Seats in the proportional part are allocated using the Imperiali quota, modified to ensure that every party list, which passes the threshold, receives at least one mandate.

== Candidates ==
=== Party lists ===
To register regional lists of candidates, parties need to collect 0.5% of signatures of all registered voters in Lipetsk Oblast.

The following parties were relieved from the necessity to collect signatures:

- United Russia
- Communist Party of the Russian Federation
- Liberal Democratic Party of Russia
- A Just Russia
- New People
- Russian Party of Pensioners for Social Justice
- Communists of Russia

№	Party	Oblast-wide list	Candidates	Territorial groups	Status
1	United Russia	Igor Artamonov • Nikolay Tagintsev • Yevgeny Savvin	30	0	Registered
2	Communist Party	Sergey Tokarev • Nikolay Bykovskikh • Tatyana Kopylova	30	9	Registered
3	A Just Russia	Larisa Ksenofontova • Vadim Yegorov	25	9	Registered
4	Communists of Russia	Dmitry Larin • Yury Loginov • Valentina Khromovskaya	11	4	Registered
5	Liberal Democratic Party	Leonid Slutsky • Marina Razdobarina • Nikolay Kurguzov	24	9	Registered
6	New People	Roman Khokhlenkov	26	9	Registered
7	Party of Pensioners	Sergey Volobuyev • ~~Yevgeny Korolev~~ • Natalya Shchedrina	24	9	Registered

Russian Ecological Party "The Greens" and Rodina, which participated in the last election, did not file.

=== Single-mandate constituencies ===
27 single-mandate constituencies were formed in Lipetsk Oblast. To register candidates in single-mandate constituencies need to collect 3% of signatures of registered voters in the constituency.

Number of candidates in single-mandate constituencies
Party	Candidates	
Party	Nominated	Registered
United Russia	27	27
Communist Party	26	26
Liberal Democratic Party	25	25
A Just Russia	24	24
Party of Pensioners	25	23
New People	26	25
Communists of Russia	13	13
Yabloko	1	0
Independent	2	0
Total	169	163

== Results ==
=== Results by party lists ===
Summary of the 18–20 September 2026 Lipetsk Oblast Council of Deputies election results
Party	Party list					Constituency		Total	
Party	Votes	%	±pp	Seats	+/–	Seats	+/–	Seats	+/–
United Russia	230,514	49.44	▲3.02	3	▼4	25	▲9	28	▲5
Communist Party	83,769	17.97	▼1.70	2	▼1	2	▼10	4	▼11
Liberal Democratic Party	44,177	9.48	▲1.23	1	Steady	0	Steady	1	Steady
New People	39,495	8.47	▲3.37	1	Steady	0	New	1	Steady
A Just Russia	24,444	5.24	▼1.19	1	Steady	0	Steady	1	Steady
Party of Pensioners	23,868	5.12	▼0.10	1	Steady	0	Steady	1	Steady
Communists of Russia	11,731	2.52	▼0.73	0	Steady	0	New	0	Steady
Invalid ballots	8,211	1.76	▼0.91	—	—	—	—	—	—
Total	466,209	100.00	—	9	▼5	27	▼1	36	▼6
Turnout	466,209	53.46	▲1.71	—	—	—	—	—	—
Registered voters	871,998	100.00	—	—	—	—	—	—	—

Vladimir Serikov (United Russia) was re-elected as Chairman of the Council of Deputies, while Russian Navy guards major and Hero of Russia Yevgeny Savvin (United Russia) was appointed to the Federation Council, replacing former Senator Maksim Kavdzharadze (United Russia) who was elected to State Duma.

=== Results in single-member constituencies ===
==== District 1 ====
Summary of the 18–20 September 2026 Lipetsk Oblast Council of Deputies election in District 1
Candidate	Party	Votes	%
Yelena Vlasova	United Russia	4,884	34.94%
Aleksandr Lyapin	Communist Party	2,267	16.01%
Maksim Zachinyayev	Liberal Democratic Party	1,749	12.35%
Andrey Golovin	New People	1,513	10.69%
Yury Loginov (incumbent)	Communists of Russia	1,284	9.07%
Boris Medvedev	A Just Russia	1,043	7.37%
Leonid Fedyakov	Party of Pensioners	994	7.02%
Total		14,160	100%

==== District 2 ====
Summary of the 18–20 September 2026 Lipetsk Oblast Council of Deputies election in District 2
Candidate	Party	Votes	%
Olga Mitrokhina (incumbent)	United Russia	5,886	46.96%
Andrey Knyazev	Communist Party	2,996	23.90%
Nikita Chebotarev	New People	1,590	12.69%
Nadezhda Panteleyeva	Liberal Democratic Party	940	7.50%
Artyom Markov	Party of Pensioners	483	3.85%
Pavel Peteshev	Communists of Russia	341	2.72%
Total		12,534	100%

==== District 3 ====
Summary of the 18–20 September 2026 Lipetsk Oblast Council of Deputies election in District 3
Candidate	Party	Votes	%
Ivan Kosilov (incumbent)	United Russia	5,380	32.98%
Ivan Sitnikov	Communist Party	3,514	21.54%
Lyudmila Kiseleva	New People	2,617	16.04%
Pavel Roldugin	Liberal Democratic Party	2,219	13.60%
Aleksandr Shakun	A Just Russia	1,165	7.14%
Olga Churilova	Communists of Russia	1,001	6.14%
Total		16,312	100%

==== District 4 ====
Summary of the 18–20 September 2026 Lipetsk Oblast Council of Deputies election in District 4
Candidate	Party	Votes	%
Sergey Gridnev	Communist Party	4,674	28.45%
Natalia Minina	United Russia	4,626	28.16%
Olga Baryshnikova	New People	2,420	14.73%
Maria Pokachalova	Liberal Democratic Party	1,487	9.05%
Aleksandr Shakun	A Just Russia	1,421	8.65%
Yelena Zubareva	Party of Pensioners	1,367	8.32%
Total		16,430	100%

==== District 5 ====
Summary of the 18–20 September 2026 Lipetsk Oblast Council of Deputies election in District 5
Candidate	Party	Votes	%
Yekaterina Pinayeva	United Russia	5,522	41.87%
Tatyana Kopylova (incumbent)	Communist Party	2,521	19.12%
Olga Yurova	New People	1,277	9.68%
Aleksey Prisekin	A Just Russia	1,180	8.95%
Yevgeny Strelnikov	Liberal Democratic Party	954	7.23%
Tatyana Kopylova	Communists of Russia	856	6.49%
Aleksey Moshchenko	Party of Pensioners	495	3.75%
Total		13,188	100%

==== District 6 ====
Summary of the 18–20 September 2026 Lipetsk Oblast Council of Deputies election in District 6
Candidate	Party	Votes	%
Yevgeny Korotayev	United Russia	4,242	30.61%
Nikolay Bykovskikh	Communist Party	3,528	25.46%
Mikhail Gladyshev	Party of Pensioners	1,431	10.33%
Pavel Krasilnikov	New People	1,393	10.05%
Kirill Andropov	A Just Russia	1,105	7.97%
Dmitry Larin (incumbent)	Communists of Russia	941	6.79%
Sergey Voronin	Liberal Democratic Party	872	6.29%
Total		13,859	100%

==== District 7 ====
Summary of the 18–20 September 2026 Lipetsk Oblast Council of Deputies election in District 7
Candidate	Party	Votes	%
Yelena Bogomolova	United Russia	4,911	34.91%
Pavel Stebletsov	Communist Party	3,710	26.37%
Aleksey Novichikhin	Liberal Democratic Party	1,409	10.02%
Yevgenia Chastikina	A Just Russia	1,401	9.96%
Roman Ryzhkov	Party of Pensioners	1,279	9.09%
Sergey Larin	Communists of Russia	963	6.85%
Total		14,067	100%

==== District 8 ====
Summary of the 18–20 September 2026 Lipetsk Oblast Council of Deputies election in District 8
Candidate	Party	Votes	%
Leonid Milovanov	United Russia	3,590	27.23%
Sergey Putilin	Communist Party	2,461	18.67%
Dmitry Tonkikh	New People	1,916	14.53%
Artyom Yelchaninov	A Just Russia	1,603	12.16%
Natalya Bogdanova	Liberal Democratic Party	1,429	10.84%
Anastasia Mikulich	Communists of Russia	1,010	7.66%
Yevgeny Korolev	Party of Pensioners	807	6.12%
Total		13,182	100%

==== District 9 ====
Summary of the 18–20 September 2026 Lipetsk Oblast Council of Deputies election in District 9
Candidate	Party	Votes	%
Anna Shamayeva	United Russia	4,579	36.17%
Aleksandr Atamanenko (incumbent)	Communist Party	3,392	26.80%
Yulia Berestneva	New People	1,836	14.50%
Tatyana Kostina	Liberal Democratic Party	1,424	11.25%
Igor Barbashin	Party of Pensioners	1,058	8.36%
Total		12,659	100%

==== District 10 ====
Summary of the 18–20 September 2026 Lipetsk Oblast Council of Deputies election in District 10
Candidate	Party	Votes	%
Dmitry Pogorelov	United Russia	6,139	40.40%
Anatoly Shkatov (incumbent)	Communist Party	3,067	20.18%
Aleksandr Popov	Liberal Democratic Party	1,758	11.57%
Aleksandr Tormyshov	New People	1,610	10.59%
Aleksey Losikhin	Party of Pensioners	807	5.31%
Anastasia Sitnikova	Communists of Russia	752	4.95%
Nikolay Rybin	A Just Russia	700	4.61%
Total		15,196	100%

==== District 11 ====
Summary of the 18–20 September 2026 Lipetsk Oblast Council of Deputies election in District 11
Candidate	Party	Votes	%
Sergey Bezrukov	Communist Party	3,899	28.32%
Larisa Kudayeva	United Russia	3,884	28.21%
Fyodor Borisyonok	New People	1,770	12.86%
Marina Abramova	A Just Russia	1,296	9.41%
Aleksandr Nikitin	Liberal Democratic Party	1,060	7.70%
Ulyana Komolykh	Party of Pensioners	815	5.92%
Valentina Khromovskaya	Communists of Russia	663	4.82%
Total		13,766	100%

==== District 12 ====
Summary of the 18–20 September 2026 Lipetsk Oblast Council of Deputies election in District 12
Candidate	Party	Votes	%
Yelena Belyanskaya	United Russia	4,248	32.11%
Mikhail Bessonov	Communist Party	3,034	22.93%
Dmitry Pocherevin	New People	2,880	21.77%
Yulia Chirkova	Communists of Russia	862	6.52%
Dmitry Merkulov	Liberal Democratic Party	700	5.29%
Gennady Mindrin	Party of Pensioners	599	4.53%
Dmitry Simakov	A Just Russia	541	4.09%
Total		13,231	100%

==== District 13 ====
Summary of the 18–20 September 2026 Lipetsk Oblast Council of Deputies election in District 13
Candidate	Party	Votes	%
Aleksandr Proskuryakov	United Russia	11,132	56.90%
Alina Vostrikova	Liberal Democratic Party	2,411	12.32%
Anastasia Grigoryan	Communist Party	2,376	12.14%
Natalya Shchedrina	Party of Pensioners	1,413	7.22%
Darya Kunitsyna	New People	1,024	5.23%
Natalya Muravskaya	A Just Russia	776	3.97%
Total		19,564	100%

==== District 14 ====
Summary of the 18–20 September 2026 Lipetsk Oblast Council of Deputies election in District 14
Candidate	Party	Votes	%
Natalia Droshnova	United Russia	11,266	67.62%
Aleksey Chaukin	Communist Party	1,821	10.93%
Darya Lelikova	Liberal Democratic Party	1,385	8.31%
Aleksey Pavlov	New People	1,137	6.82%
Yelena Voropayeva	Communists of Russia	566	3.40%
Evelina Titova	A Just Russia	399	2.39%
Total		16,660	100%

==== District 15 ====
Summary of the 18–20 September 2026 Lipetsk Oblast Council of Deputies election in District 15
Candidate	Party	Votes	%
Dmitry Pavlov (incumbent)	United Russia	10,633	62.70%
Dmitry Antipov	Communist Party	2,612	15.40%
Oleg Aksenov	New People	1,376	8.11%
Irina Chekuldayeva	A Just Russia	1,346	7.94%
Nadezhda Zyuzina	Party of Pensioners	956	5.64%
Total		16,959	100%

==== District 16 ====
Summary of the 18–20 September 2026 Lipetsk Oblast Council of Deputies election in District 16
Candidate	Party	Votes	%
Gennady Krutskikh (incumbent)	United Russia	10,776	62.26%
Aleksandr Putilin	Communist Party	2,420	13.98%
Antonina Bakhtina	Party of Pensioners	1,208	6.98%
Natasha Stoyneva	Liberal Democratic Party	1,035	5.98%
Oksana Chernyshova	A Just Russia	943	5.45%
Gennady Shuklov	New People	691	3.99%
Total		17,309	100%

==== District 17 ====
Summary of the 18–20 September 2026 Lipetsk Oblast Council of Deputies election in District 17
Candidate	Party	Votes	%
Anna Shcherbak	United Russia	12,602	68.57%
Yury Petrukhin	Communist Party	1,763	9.59%
Anna Zayeva	Liberal Democratic Party	1,491	8.11%
Vadim Tarov	Party of Pensioners	1,114	6.06%
Yulia Pervyshina	A Just Russia	664	3.61%
Vladimir Bukhonov	New People	593	3.23%
Total		18,378	100%

==== District 18 ====
Summary of the 18–20 September 2026 Lipetsk Oblast Council of Deputies election in District 18
Candidate	Party	Votes	%
Nikolay Tagintsev	United Russia	14,788	55.79%
Aleksey Pozhidayev	Communist Party	4,423	16.69%
Yelena Semenikhina	A Just Russia	2,605	9.83%
Yulia Pidoprygora	New People	2,287	8.63%
Sergey Volobuyev	Party of Pensioners	1,773	6.69%
Total		26,507	100%

==== District 19 ====
Summary of the 18–20 September 2026 Lipetsk Oblast Council of Deputies election in District 19
Candidate	Party	Votes	%
Sergey Anosov	United Russia	13,701	54.84%
Anatoly Mareyev	Communist Party	4,012	16.06%
Gennady Ulshin	Liberal Democratic Party	2,571	10.29%
Galina Ivanova	Party of Pensioners	2,180	8.73%
Sergey Malakhanov	A Just Russia	1,146	4.59%
Emil Mamedov	New People	879	3.52%
Total		24,984	100%

==== District 20 ====
Summary of the 18–20 September 2026 Lipetsk Oblast Council of Deputies election in District 20
Candidate	Party	Votes	%
Maksim Tolstopyatov (incumbent)	United Russia	6,115	35.52%
Stanislav Kleymenov	Communist Party	3,361	19.52%
Aleksey Ananyev	A Just Russia	1,968	11.43%
Aleksandr Mosin	Party of Pensioners	1,895	11.01%
Ilya Pekshev	New People	1,813	10.53%
Pavel Zarochintsev	Liberal Democratic Party	1,506	8.75%
Total		17,214	100%

==== District 21 ====
Summary of the 18–20 September 2026 Lipetsk Oblast Council of Deputies election in District 21
Candidate	Party	Votes	%
Vladimir Serikov (incumbent)	United Russia	7,947	46.53%
Andrey Ustinov	Communist Party	3,055	17.89%
Anna Bolbas	A Just Russia	2,172	12.72%
Sergey Merkulov	Liberal Democratic Party	2,153	12.60%
Dmitry Solomatin	Communists of Russia	1,245	7.29%
Total		17,081	100%

==== District 22 ====
Summary of the 18–20 September 2026 Lipetsk Oblast Council of Deputies election in District 22
Candidate	Party	Votes	%
Yekaterina Khrustalyova (incumbent)	United Russia	12,185	61.95%
Oleg Vetrov	Liberal Democratic Party	2,650	13.47%
Olga Ivanova	A Just Russia	2,295	11.67%
Aleksandr Abramov	New People	2,165	11.01%
Total		19,670	100%

==== District 23 ====
Summary of the 18–20 September 2026 Lipetsk Oblast Council of Deputies election in District 23
Candidate	Party	Votes	%
Boris Bogatikov (incumbent)	United Russia	14,414	63.32%
Olga Malyutina	Party of Pensioners	3,146	13.82%
Vladislav Vetrov	Liberal Democratic Party	1,960	8.61%
Eduard Loshkaryov	Communist Party	1,860	8.17%
Aleksey Popov	New People	967	4.25%
Total		22,764	100%

==== District 24 ====
Summary of the 18–20 September 2026 Lipetsk Oblast Council of Deputies election in District 24
Candidate	Party	Votes	%
Natalya Blinova	United Russia	11,250	66.59%
Sergey Shatsky	Communist Party	1,824	10.80%
Oleg Silantyev	New People	1,228	7.27%
Anna Prokhorova	A Just Russia	764	4.52%
Nikolay Kalutskikh	Liberal Democratic Party	740	4.38%
Tamara Lyubimova	Party of Pensioners	719	4.26%
Total		16,894	100%

==== District 25 ====
Summary of the 18–20 September 2026 Lipetsk Oblast Council of Deputies election in District 25
Candidate	Party	Votes	%
Gennady Sukhorukov (incumbent)	United Russia	13,185	61.80%
Marina Dvornikova	Liberal Democratic Party	2,111	9.90%
Yury Plyukhin	Communist Party	1,733	8.12%
Yusup Ibragimov	Party of Pensioners	1,729	8.10%
Olga Grishina	A Just Russia	1,477	6.92%
Maria Kryukova	New People	743	3.48%
Total		21,334	100%

==== District 26 ====
Summary of the 18–20 September 2026 Lipetsk Oblast Council of Deputies election in District 26
Candidate	Party	Votes	%
Dmitry Yeremeyev (incumbent)	United Russia	13,435	64.34%
Sergey Pupynin	Communist Party	2,195	10.51%
Denis Salnikov	New People	1,230	5.89%
Aleksey Sobolev	Communists of Russia	1,142	5.47%
Nikolay Kibirin	Liberal Democratic Party	1,061	5.08%
Nadezhda Malakhova	A Just Russia	795	3.81%
Irina Nosova	Party of Pensioners	594	2.84%
Total		20,881	100%

==== District 27 ====
Summary of the 18–20 September 2026 Lipetsk Oblast Council of Deputies election in District 27
Candidate	Party	Votes	%
Oleg Nosov (incumbent)	United Russia	8,272	43.67%
Lyubov Pestrikova	Communist Party	3,105	16.39%
Nadezhda Baranova	A Just Russia	2,019	10.66%
Darya Chernykh	New People	1,831	9.67%
Zinaida Dodonova	Party of Pensioners	1,628	8.59%
Nikolay Kurguzov	Liberal Democratic Party	1,522	8.04%
Total		18,942	100%

=== Members ===
Incumbent deputies are highlighted with bold, elected members who declined to take a seat are marked with ~~strikethrough~~.

Constituency
No.	Member	Party
1	Yelena Vlasova	United Russia
2	Olga Mitrokhina	United Russia
3	Ivan Kosilov	United Russia
4	Sergey Gridnev	Communist Party
5	Yekaterina Pinayeva	United Russia
6	Yevgeny Korotayev	United Russia
7	Yelena Bogomolova	United Russia
8	Leonid Milovanov	United Russia
9	Anna Shamayeva	United Russia
10	Dmitry Pogorelov	United Russia
11	Sergey Bezrukov	Communist Party
12	Yelena Belyanskaya	United Russia
13	Aleksandr Proskuryakov	United Russia
14	Natalia Droshnova	United Russia
15	Dmitry Pavlov	United Russia
16	Gennady Krutskikh	United Russia
17	Anna Shcherbak	United Russia
18	Nikolay Tagintsev	United Russia
19	Sergey Anosov	United Russia
20	Maksim Tolstopyatov	United Russia
21	Vladimir Serikov	United Russia
22	Yekaterina Khrustalyova	United Russia
23	Boris Bogatikov	United Russia
24	Natalya Blinova	United Russia
25	Gennady Sukhorukov	United Russia
26	Dmitry Yeremeyev	United Russia
27	Oleg Nosov	United Russia

Party lists
Member	Party
~~Igor Artamonov~~	United Russia
Yevgeny Savvin	United Russia
~~Anatoly Popov~~	United Russia
~~Irina Savishina~~	United Russia
Andrey Frolov	United Russia
Aleksandr Kremnyov	United Russia
Sergey Tokarev	Communist Party
Nikolay Bykovskikh	Communist Party
~~Leonid Slutsky~~	Liberal Democratic Party
Marina Razdobarina	Liberal Democratic Party
~~Roman Khokhlenkov~~	New People
~~Yevgeny Isayev~~	New People
~~Lyudmila Kiseleva~~	New People
~~Olga Baryshnikova~~	New People
Roman Arzumanov	New People
Larisa Ksenofontova	A Just Russia
Sergey Volobuyev	Party of Pensioners

== See also ==
- 2026 Russian regional elections
