= Governor of Lipetsk Oblast =

Highest-ranking official in Lipetsk Oblast, Russia

- Coat of Arms of Lipetsk Oblast

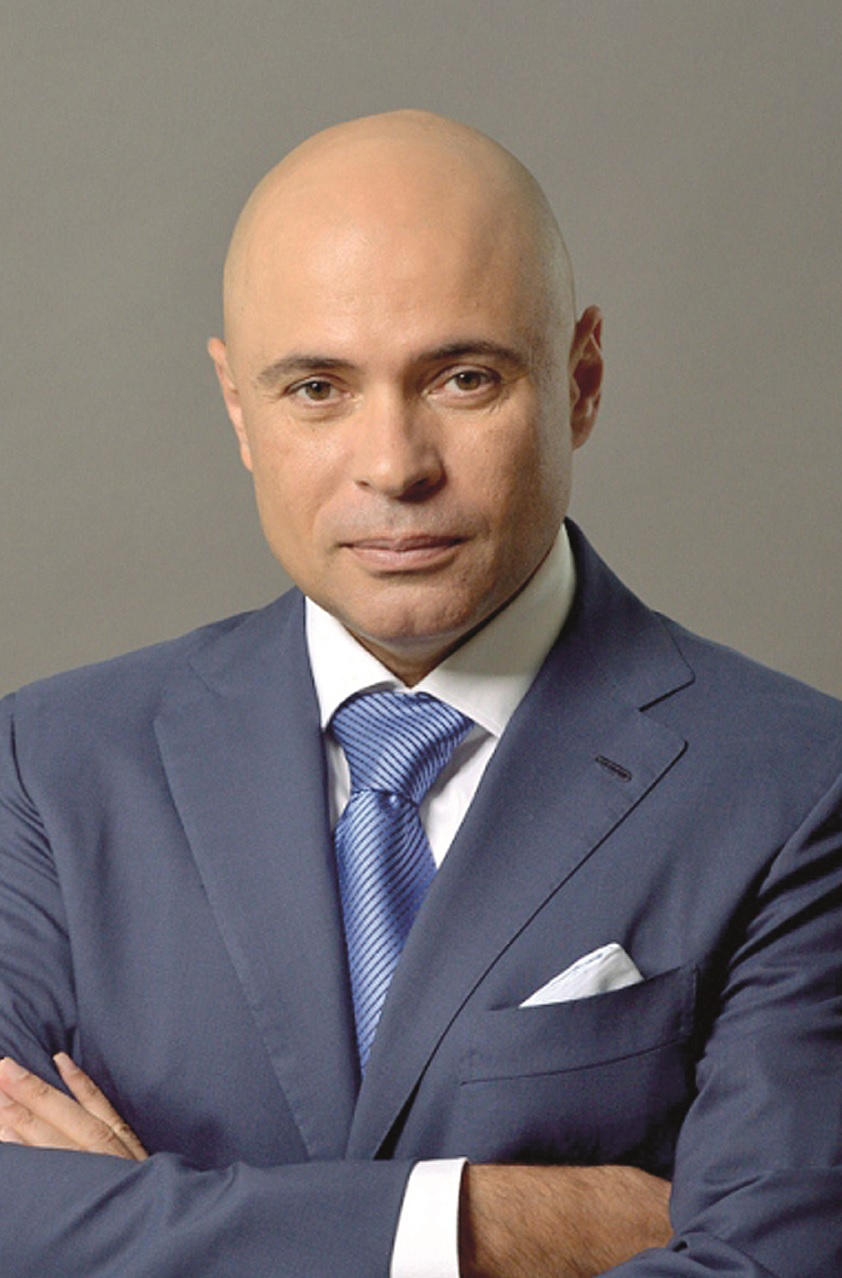
- Incumbent; Igor Artamonov since 13 September 2019
- Residence: Lipetsk
- Term length: 5 years
- Constituting instrument: Charter of Lipetsk Oblast, Section 5
- Formation: 1991
- First holder: Gennady Kuptsov
- Website: admlip.ru

The Governor of Lipetsk Oblast (Russian: Губернатор Липецкой области) is the highest official of that region of Russia. The status and powers of the Head of Administration are determined in Chapter 5 of the Lipetsk Oblast Charter.

== History ==
In the late 1991, the President of Russia Boris Yeltsin appointed the heads of the executive authorities in the regions.

So, on 23 October, by the presidential decree, Gennady Kuptsov was appointed Head of Administration of Lipetsk Oblast. On 23 December 1992, he was dismissed by Yeltsin. Disagreeing with the decision, Kuptsov filed a lawsuit against the president, demanding reinstatement for himself. In September 1994, the Moscow City Court overturned the president's decision, but Kuptsov was not reinstated in the administration, since the new governor had already been elected.

Lipetsk Oblast became one of the first regions of the Russian Federation where direct elections of the head of the region were held, on 11 April 1993. In 1999, a two-term limit was introduced.

Unlike other leaders of Russian oblasts, Oleg Korolyov, elected in 1998, did not support the usage of the word “governor”, keeping style himself as Head of Administration. Administrations of Lipetsk and Tambov Oblasts explain this by the fact that there are no governorates in modern Russia.

In 2004, on the initiative of the President of Russia Vladimir Putin, the procedure for electing the highest officials of the regions was changed from the popular vote to appointment by the legislative bodies from the list of candidacies submitted by the President. Despite the fact that Oleg Korolyov's second term was expected to end only in April 2007, in mid-May 2005 he prematurely resigned, and on May 24 Putin submitted his candidacy to the regional council. The same procedure took place in April 2010.

Korolyov was reelected in 2014 and resigned in October 2018, moving to the Senate. He was succeeded by Igor Artamonov.

On 26 May 2022, the oblast Council of Deputies adopted amendments to the Charter, renaming the office of the Head of Administration into Governor of Lipetsk Oblast.

== List ==
No.	Portrait	Governor	Tenure	Time in office	Party	Election
1		Gennady Kuptsov (born 1940)	23 October 1991 – 23 December 1992 (removed)	1 year, 61 days	Independent	Appointed
—		Vladimir Zaytsev (born 1951)	23 December 1992 – 12 April 1993 (lost election)	110 days	Independent	Acting
2		Mikhail Narolin (1933–2011)	12 April 1993 – 14 April 1998 (lost re-election)	5 years, 2 days	Independent	1993
3		Oleg Korolyov (born 1952)	14 April 1998 – 17 May 2014 (resigned)	20 years, 171 days	Independent → United Russia	1998; 2002; 2005 (Note: Appointed by the president of Russia with the consent of the Lipetsk Oblast Council of Deputies.); 2010
—		Oleg Korolyov (born 1952)	17 May 2014 – 19 September 2014	20 years, 171 days	Independent → United Russia	Acting
(3)		Oleg Korolyov (born 1952)	19 September 2014 – 2 October 2018 (resigned)	20 years, 171 days	Independent → United Russia	2014
—		Igor Artamonov (born 1967)	2 October 2018 – 13 September 2019	8 years, 28 days	United Russia	Acting
4		Igor Artamonov (born 1967)	13 September 2019 – present	8 years, 28 days	United Russia	2019; 2024
