= Oleg Korolyov =

Russian politician

- Олег Королёв
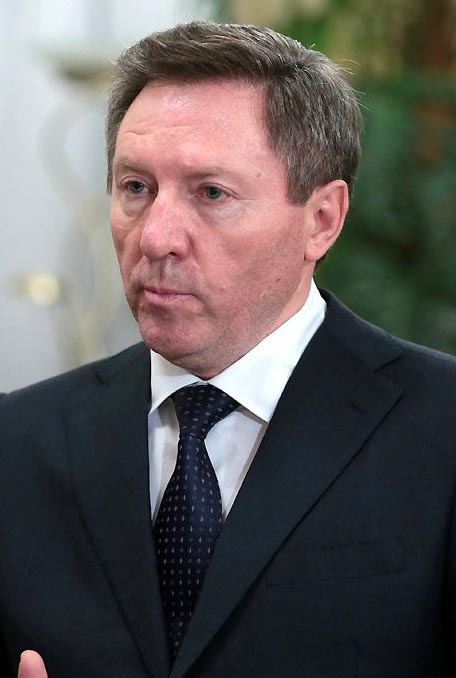
- Korolyov in 2014

Russian Federation Senator from Lipetsk Oblast
- In office 15 November 2018 – 23 June 2021
- Preceded by: Irina Tikhonova
- Succeeded by: Oksana Khlyakina

3rd Governor of Lipetsk Oblast
- In office 12 April 1998 – 2 October 2018
- Preceded by: Mikhail Narolin
- Succeeded by: Igor Artamonov

Personal details
- Born: 23 February 1952 (age 74) Terbuny, Lipetsk Oblast, RSFSR, Soviet Union
- Party: United Russia
- Education: Saratov State Agrarian University
- Profession: Mechanical Engineer
- Website: http://olegkorolev.ru/

Oleg Petrovich Korolyov (Russian: Олег Петрович Королёв) is a Russian politician. He served as the Head of Administration of Lipetsk Oblast in Russia between 1998 and 2018. He became a member of the federation council in 1996. He was elected with a declared result of more than 70% of the votes cast. He was reelected with a declared result of more than 70% of the votes cast in 2002. His administration has garnered praise for the authorities' treatment of its Jewish minority. Korolev met with chief rabbi of Lipetsk Shaul Adam on 2 February 2006; the rabbi reported on local radio that there had been no antisemitic incidents in Lipetsk Oblast.
