= Mikhail Narolin =

Russian politician

- Михаил Наролин
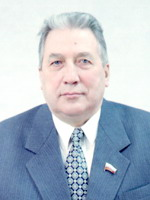

2nd Head of Lipetsk Oblast
- In office 11 April 1993 – 14 April 1998
- Preceded by: Vladimir Zaytsev (acting)
- Succeeded by: Oleg Korolyov

Personal details
- Born: Mikhail Tikhonovich Narolin; 19 October 1933 Perlyovka, Semiluksky District, Central Black Earth Oblast, Russian SSR, Soviet Union
- Died: 21 January 2011 (aged 77) Lipetsk, Russia
- Party: Independent

Mikhail Tikhonovich Narolin (Russian: Михаил Тихонович Наролин; 19 October 1933 - 21 January 2011), was a Russian politician who served as the 2nd Head of Lipetsk Oblast from 1993 to 1998.

== Biography ==
Mikhail Narolin was born on 19 October 1933 in Perlyovka, Semiluksky district (now Voronezh Oblast).

He graduated from the Voronezh Agricultural Institute in 1957.

He worked as an engineer at the Vasilievskaya MTS of the Volovsky district of the Lipetsk Oblast, and was the chief engineer for technical supervision and director of the Volovskaya repair and technical station.

Since 1961, he was the director of the Volovsky district association "Agricultural Equipment". In 1962, he was promoted to the deputy chairman of the Lipetsk regional association "Agricultural Equipment". In 1965, he was the Deputy Head of the Regional Department of Agriculture.

Since 1969, head of the department of land reclamation and water management of the Lipetsk Regional Executive Committee. He supervised the work on the creation of the Matyr reservoir. In 1975, he was the head of the regional department of agriculture.

By 1980, he was elected a deputy, then the first deputy chairman of the executive committee of the Lipetsk Regional Council. In November 1991, he was appointed first deputy head of the regional administration.

He had been a longtime member of the Communist Party of the Soviet Union until August 1991.

On 11 April 1993, popular elections of the head of the regional administration took place to replace acting head of the region Vladimir Zaytsev. There were 14 candidates vying for the governor's seat. Narolin won a landslide victory, gaining 49.8% of the vote (the closest pursuer was V. Bezrukov - 7.8%). At the same time, on 12 December 1993, Narolin was elected as a member of the Federation Council while serving as governor.

On 21 September 1994, the Moscow City Court overturned the president Boris Yeltsin's decision to replace former governor Gennady Kuptsov, but it wasn't enough to reinstate Kupstov into office, since Narolin was elected and was in already sworn into office anyway since 1993. As a result, Kuptsov became the first Russian citizen to win the process against the head of state.

In April 1995, he joined the organizing committee of the Our Home - Russia movement (which V.S. Chernomyrdin called the "party of power"). The construction of the local NDR party cell began with the convening of the administrative and economic activists and declaring it the core of the regional branch of the party.

In 1996, he became a member of the Federation Council of the second convocation. He was a member of the Federation Council Committee on Agrarian Policy.

On 12 April 1998, elections were held for the head of the administration of the Lipetsk region, where Oleg Korolyov received 79.28% of the votes, and defeated Narolin, who received 13.86% of the votes. Challengers V. M. Podgorny received, 1.16%, V. Kuznetsov, 0.47% of the votes, against all candidate, 1 .39% the number of voters who took part in the voting.

He died on 21 January 2011 in a Lipetsk hospital. He was buried on 24 January 2011 at the Pipe Plant cemetery in Lipetsk.

== Personal life ==
He was a big football fan. Under him, the Metallurg football club achieved the best result in its entire history. In the 1997 season, the club took 2nd place in the first PFL league.

=== Family ===
Narolin's son, Aleksandr, is the deputy governor of the Lipetsk region, in charge of construction and housing and communal services.

== Honors ==
On 18 October 2013, in Lipetsk, in the park at the intersection of Lenin and Zhelyabov streets, a monument to Mikhail Narolin was erected. Authors of the monument: Yuri Grishko and Igor Mazur.
