= Maksim Kavdzharadze =

Russian politician (born 1969)

- Максим Кавджарадзе
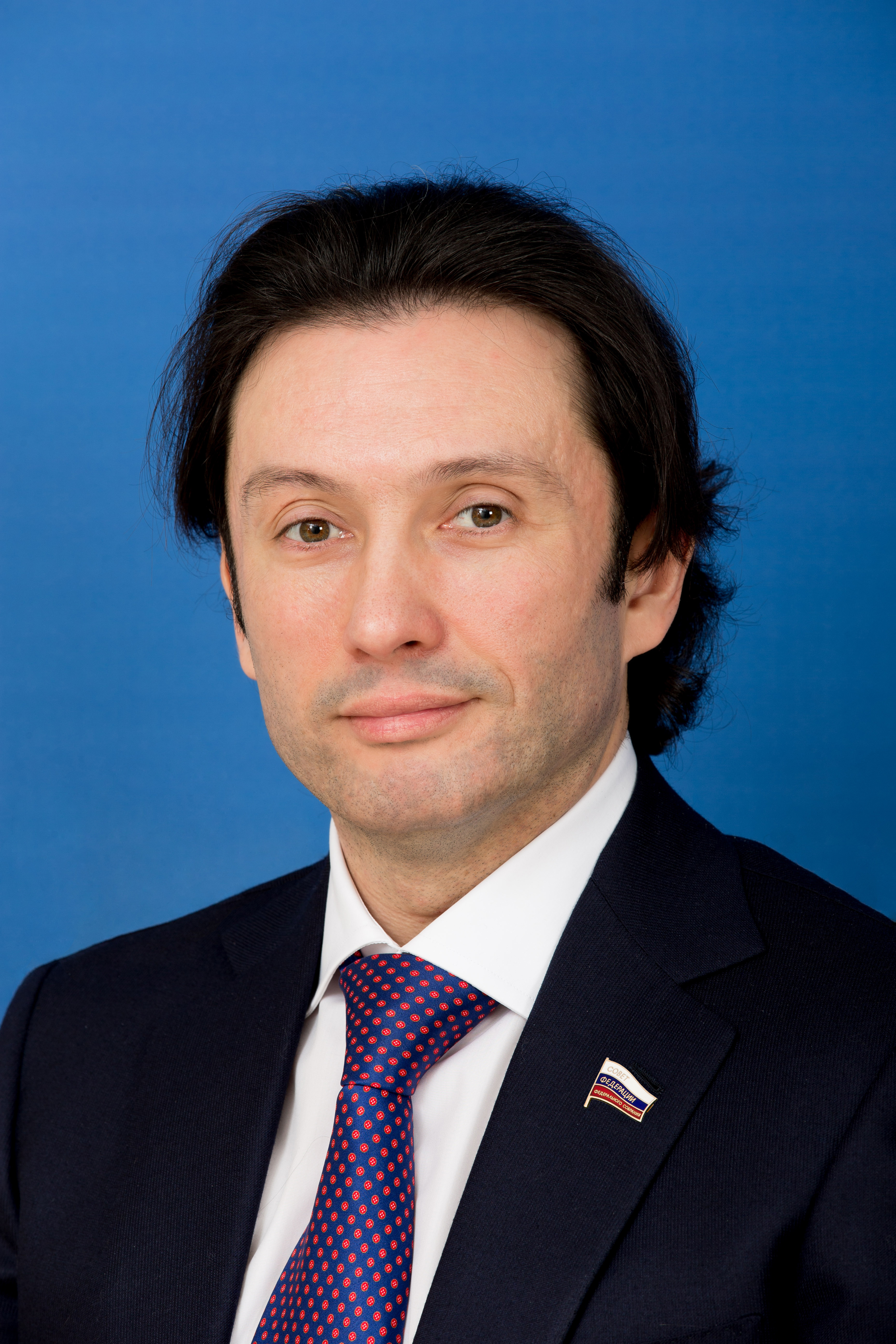

Russian Federation Senator from Lipetsk Oblast
- Incumbent
- Assumed office 25 December 2001
- Preceded by: Seat established

Personal details
- Born: Maksim Gennadyevich Kavdzharadze; 10 June 1969 (age 57) Moscow, Soviet Union
- Party: United Russia

Maksim Gennadyevich Kavdzharadze (Russian: Максим Геннадьевич Кавджарадзе; born 10 June 1969) is a Russian politician who is a member of the Federation Council as the representative of the Lipetsk Oblast Council of Deputies.

He was the deputy Chairman of the Federation Council Committee on Constitutional Legislation and State Building, Deputy Chairman of the Commission under the President of the Russian Federation on the Development of General Aviation.

He was the head of the working group on improving the legal framework and the procedure for the provision of public services (execution of public functions) in the field of general aviation.

He was the chairman of the Interim Commission of the Federation Council for Monitoring the Implementation of the Federal Law "On Amendments to Certain Legislative Acts of the Russian Federation on Ensuring Transport Security".

He is a member of the United Russia party.

== Biography ==
Maksim Kavdzharadze was born on 10 June 1969 in Moscow. He graduated from the State Educational Institution of Higher Professional Education "Moscow State Law Academy" with a degree in jurisprudence with the qualification of a "lawyer".

According to his official biography, he began his career as a stage engineer at the Circus on Stage.

Since 1992, he has been a senior economist at Étoile JSC.

Since 1995, he has been the First Deputy Chairman of the Board of Sphinx Bank.

From 1999 to 2001, he was the First Deputy General Director of the State Unitary Enterprise "Federal Agency for Food Market Regulation" under the Ministry of Agriculture of Russia, as he was responsible for interaction with federal authorities.

On 25 December 2001, for the first time, Kavdzharadze was elected a member of the Federation Council from the Lipetsk Oblast Council of Deputies.

In 2002, Kavdzharadze went to Chechnya. In the republic, the senator held a meeting with employees of the Lipetsk Internal Affairs Directorate, riot police, security forces and patrol officers. The purpose of the working trip was to congratulate voters on the Day of Militia. In the field, Kavdzharadze presented everyone with individual kits with an exclusive set of Russian Olympians' sports uniforms.

In the summer of 2003, he was a candidate for the post of auditor of the Accounts Chamber of Russia from the Federation Council.

In November 2006, Kavdzharadze was re-elected as a representative of the Lipetsk Oblast Council of Deputies in the Federation Council. 48 deputies voted in favor, one against, and one abstained. At the same time, he was approved as a member of the Federation Council Committee on Agrarian and Food Policy and as a member of the Federation Council Commission on Youth Affairs and Sports.

In December 2006, he was elected Deputy Chairman of the Federation Council Committee on Agrarian and Food Policy (since 2007, the Federation Council Committee on Agrarian and Food Policy and the Fisheries Industry).

Since July 2007, he has been a member of the Federation Council Commission on Housing Policy and Housing and Communal Services.

In the autumn of 2007, he has been the chairman of the Expert Council for the development of legislative proposals in the field of state housing policy.

On 4 December 2011, he was elected to the Lipetsk Oblast Council of Deputies on the list of United Russia.

On 13 December 2011, he was elected for the third time as a representative of the Lipetsk Oblast Council of Deputies in the Federation Council. 38 MPs voted in favor, 12 voted against, and one abstained.

On 13 November 2012 Member of the Commission under the President of Russia on the development of general aviation. He was the head of the working group on improving the legal framework and the procedure for the provision of public services (execution of public functions) in the field of general aviation.

Since November 2013, he has been a member of the Federation Council Committee on Constitutional Legislation, Legal and Judicial Issues, Development of Civil Society.

In accordance with Decree of the President of Russia of 25 December 2013 No. 955, Kavdzharadze was appointed Deputy Chairman of the Commission under the President of the Russian Federation on the development of general aviation.

On 19 February 2014, Chairman of the Interim Commission of the Federation Council for Monitoring the Implementation of the Federal Law "On Amendments to Certain Legislative Acts of the Russian Federation on Ensuring Transport Security"

On 3 March 2015, at a meeting of the Committee of the Federation Council on Constitutional Legislation and State Building and at the Council of the Chamber in the Federation Council, a report was presented by the Interim Commission of the Federation Council on monitoring the implementation of the federal law "On Amendments to Certain Legislative Acts of the Russian Federation on Ensuring Transport Security". The report presents data on financing necessary for business entities to ensure transport safety standards. In addition, the document contains information on the calculations of the costs of the constituent entities of Russia related to the implementation of the norms of the Federal Law. In their appeals, the constituent entities of the Russian Federation indicate that due to the budget deficit, the actual costs of implementing the requirements for ensuring transport security are not incurred, or are partially incurred. Kavdzharadze points to the Decree of the Government o Russia dated January 27, 2015 No. 98-r, which approved the "Plan of priority measures to ensure sustainable economic development and social stability in 2015", according to which it is necessary to postpone the entry into force of the requirements in the field of transport security in relation to certain types of transport facilities, in order to delay the introduction of additional production costs for business entities.

Meanwhile, during the work of the commission, other legal gaps and contradictions in the field of legislation aimed at ensuring the protection of the transport complex from acts of unlawful interference, including terrorist acts, were also identified.

At the end of the report, Kavzharadze emphasizes that the created transport security system is aimed at the sustainable and safe functioning of the transport complex, protecting the interests of the individual, society and the state in the field of the transport complex from illegal actions, including terrorist acts that threaten the safety of the transport complex, entailing resulting in harm to human life and health.

On 26 June 2015, he was elected Deputy Chairman of the Federation Council Committee on Constitutional Legislation and State Building.

According to the income and property declaration as of 2018, Kavdzharadze earned 4,857,000 rubles. He owns an apartment of 38.7 square meters.

=== Initiatives ===
Member of the Federation Council Kavdzharadze spoke in April 2008 about the problems of legislative regulation of tobacco consumption in Russia. In an interview with Rossiyskaya Gazeta, Kavdzharadze, as an active supporter of a healthy lifestyle, spoke about the legal control over "smokers".

An active supporter of strict legal control over tobacco users, member of the Federation Council Kavdzharadze, told RG about the problems of legislative regulation of the consumption of tobacco products in Russia.

He also made the initiative to create a telecommunications network closed from the EU and the US was voiced at a meeting of the Federation Council Committee on Information Legislation, where new rules for registering bloggers were also discussed.

What we call this information system - it does not matter: "Crocodile Gena" or "Cheburashka". The latter is even preferable, since no one has Cheburashka.

—

His other proposal was a natural and logical idea that arose a few days after Vladimir Putin's direct line, during which it was stated that the Internet was born as a CIA project. The proposed name determined in 2014 the word formation of a new term in colloquial Russian, which subsequently gave statistical results.

The electronics industry is the locomotive for the development of industries and the economy (January 2015)

…for the development of the domestic electronics industry, the role of the state is paramount, as new technologies require huge investments. In addition to financial resources, a set of state support measures is also required for the formation of a planned policy for the development of the domestic electronics industry.

— Kavdzhavadze

The wealth of intellectual capital in the energy sector (March 2015).

…Energy is not only the future and the key to economic prosperity, it is the foundation for the existence of any civilization. Today, the world uses two main groups of energy sources - these are non-renewable resources such as oil, gas, shale, coal, uranium used in nuclear (nuclear) energy and renewable - solar, wind, water and geothermal energy. Considering that today is not an easy time for us, we must retain the technology and make the product commercially attractive, with the involvement of private and business capital. One must understand that each country strives to obtain an alternative form of energy so as not to depend on anyone, and today we have all the resources to take into account and reorient our economy by the time when the extraction of hydrocarbon raw materials - oil - becomes irrelevant ...

— Kavdzhavadze. »

== Sanctions ==
In December 2022 the EU sanctioned Maksim Kavdzharadze in relation to the 2022 Russian invasion of Ukraine.
