= Gennady Kuptsov =

Russian politician

- Геннадий Купцов

1st Governor of Lipetsk Oblast
- In office 23 October 1991 – 23 December 1992
- Succeeded by: Vladimir Zaytsev

Personal details
- Born: Genbady Vasilyevich Kuptsov; 14 September 1940 (age 85) Skachikha, Rtishchevsky District, Saratov Oblast, RSFSR, Soviet Union

Genbady Vasilyevich Kuptsov (Russian: Геннадий Васильевич Купцов; born 14 September 1940), is a Russian politician who had served as the first governor of Lipetsk Oblast from 1991 to 1992.

== Biography ==
Gennady Kuptsov was born on 14 September 1940.

In 1957, he graduated from a secondary school in Baku and entered as a carpenter's apprentice at the construction of the Sumgait Thermal Power Plant.

In 1958, he entered the Leningrad Metallurgical College. From 1961 to 1964, he worked at the Novolipetsk Metallurgical Plant as a steelworker's assistant, quality control inspector, senior engineer in the safety and industrial sanitation department.

=== Political career ===
Kuptsov was elected a people's deputy of the Lipetsk Regional Council of People's Deputies from constituency No. 45, and was the coordinator of the Democratic Russia group.

On 23 October 1991, by decree of the President of the RSFSR, Kuptsov was appointed the first head of the Lipetsk Oblast. As head of the region, he was in confrontation with the regional council and the mayor of Lipetsk, as he supported Gaidar's reforms.

On 23 December 1992, Kuptsov was dismissed of his post by decree of President Boris Yeltsin, and being replaced by Vladimir Zaytsev, as the acting head. Disagreeing with the decision, he filed a lawsuit against the president, demanding reinstatement.

By a decision of 21 September 1994, the Moscow City Court overturned the president's decision, but Kuptsov was not reinstated in his position, since the new governor of the region, Mikhail Narolin, had already been elected in on 11 April 1993. As a result, Kuptsov became the first Russian citizen to win the process against the head of state.

After his resignation, he works as the General Director of LLC NPO Loza. Kuptsov was nominated to run as a member of the State Duma, but the signatures he collected were declared invalid. In 1998, he collected signatures for participation in the gubernatorial elections, but did not run. In 2002, he also put forward his candidacy for participation in the elections of the Head of the Lipetsk Oblast, but on 14 March 2002, he was denied registration.

=== Further case ===
On 15 July 2011, Kuptsov filed a claim in the Lipetsk Regional Court. In 1976, together with three scientists, he patented the invention "Device for protecting liquid metal from interaction with the environment", which, according to the plaintiff, has been used at NLMK since 1992. Kuptsov demanded royalties from NLMK in the amount of 227,939,772,584 rubles. However, Kuptsov failed to prove the use of the invention by the plant.
