= Federal Agency for Ethnic Affairs =

Russian federal agency

- Федеральное агентство по делам национальностей (ФАДН)

Agency overview
- Formed: 31 March 2015; 11 years ago
- Agency executive: Igor Barinov
- Website: Fadn.gov.ru

The Federal Agency for Ethnic Affairs (FADN; Russian: Федеральное агентство по делам национальностей (ФАДН), romanized: Federalnoye agentstvo po delam natsionalnostey) is a Russian federal agency tasked with nationality and ethnic policy. It was formed through presidential ukase on March 31, 2015 and is an independent agency that functions as part of the government of Russia.
