= Perlyovka =

Perlyovka Перлёвка
- Selo
- Location within Voronezh Oblast Location within Russia
- Coordinates: 51°51′N 38°51′E
- Country: Russia
- Region: Voronezh Oblast
- District: Semiluksky District
- Time zone: UTC+3:00

Perlyovka (Russian: Перлёвка) is a rural locality (a selo) and the administrative center of Perlyovskoye Rural Settlement, Semiluksky District, Voronezh Oblast, Russia. The population was 1,038 as of 2010. There are 46 streets.

== Geography ==
Perlyovka is located 21 km northwest of Semiluki (the district's administrative centre) by road. Chistaya Polyana is the nearest rural locality.
