= Vladimir Zaytsev =

Russian politician

- Владимир Зайцев

Head of Lipetsk Oblast (acting)
- In office 23 December 1992 – 11 April 1993
- Preceded by: Gennady Kuptsov
- Succeeded by: Mikhail Narolin

Personal details
- Born: 1951 (age 74–75) Tula Oblast, Russia, Soviet Union
- Party: Independent

Vladimir Vasilyevich Zaytsev (Russian: Владимир Васильевич Зайцев; born in 1951), is a Russian politician who had been the acting head of Lipetsk Oblast from 1992 to 1993.

== Biography ==
Vladimir Zaystev was born in Kireyevsky District of Tula Oblast in 1951. He graduated from the Tula Polytechnic Institute with a degree in mining engineer-economist.

In 1992, he had been the Deputy Head of Administration of the Lipetsk Oblast, as the Chairman of the Committee on Finance and Economic Forecasting. On 23 December 1992, Zaytsev became the acting head of Lipetsk Oblast, until being replaced by Mikhail Narolin on 11 April 1993.
