= Viktor Polyanichko =

Soviet and Russian diplomat and politician (1937–1993)

- Виктор Поляничко

Head of the Provisional Administration of the Ingush Republic
- In office 19 December 1992 – 7 March 1993
- Preceded by: Ruslan Aushev
- Succeeded by: Ruslan Aushev (as the Head of the Republic of Ingushetia)

Second Secretary of the Central Committee of the Communist Party of Azerbaijan
- In office 1988–1991
- First Secretary: Abdurrahman Vazirov; Ayaz Mutallibov

Personal details
- Born: Viktor Petrovich Polyanichko; 9 March 1937 Rostov-on-Don, Russian SFSR, Soviet Union
- Died: 1 August 1993 (aged 56) Tarskoye, Prigorodny District, North Ossetia–Alania
- Party: Communist Party of the Soviet Union (until 1991)

Viktor Petrovich Polyanichko (Russian: Виктор Петрович Поляничко; 9 March 1937 – 1 August 1993) was a Soviet and Russian diplomat and politician. He was an official who held the rank of Deputy Prime Minister of Russia, a people's deputy of the USSR, a people's deputy of the Azerbaijan SSR, a deputy of the Chelyabinsk Regional Council of Workers' Deputies, and a delegate of the 23rd Congress of the Communist Party of the Soviet Union.

== Career ==
Polyanichko began his political activity as a member of the Komsomol, and professionally worked physically in a machinery factory. From 1959 to 1964, he headed the Komsomol branch in Orsk as the first secretary. In 1965, he worked briefly in the Central Committee of the organization in Moscow, then for six years he headed its structures in Chelyabinsk. In 1972, he joined the city committee of the Communist Party and became its first secretary. From 1972 to 1978, he worked in a similar position in the Orenburg Oblast. From 1978 to 1985, he headed the propaganda section in the Central Committee of the Polish United Workers' Party.

In 1985, Polyanichko was delegated to Afghanistan and worked for three years as one of the Soviet advisers to the People's Democratic Party of Afghanistan. In 1988, he was sent to work in the Azerbaijan Soviet Socialist Republic as deputy first secretary of the Communist Party of Azerbaijan. He held this position for three years. From 1990, he also headed the party committee dealing with the First Nagorno-Karabakh War. He belonged to a group of Azerbaijani communists advocating a more decisive policy regarding Armenian claims to Nagorno-Karabakh. In 1990, Polyanichko was involved in organizing and later executing a campaign to deport ethnic Armenians from their homeland of Nagorno-Karabakh.

On 26 June 1993, Polyanichko was appointed head of the interim administration of designated areas of the republics of North Ossetia and Ingushetia, with the rank of deputy prime minister of Russia.

== Death ==
On 1 August 1993, Polyanichko was shot to death in a terrorrist attack in Tarskoye. The medical examination determined that he died on the spot from 15 gunshot wounds. Along with him, the head of the Vladikavkaz garrison, Major General Anatoly Koretsky, and senior lieutenant of the Alfa special forces unit, Viktor Kravchuk, were also killed. In addition, 4 Russian soldiers were injured during the attack. His death is still unsolved. Polyanichko was buried at the Novodevichy Cemetery in Moscow.
