= Igor Artamonov =

Russian politician and statesman

- Игорь Артамонов
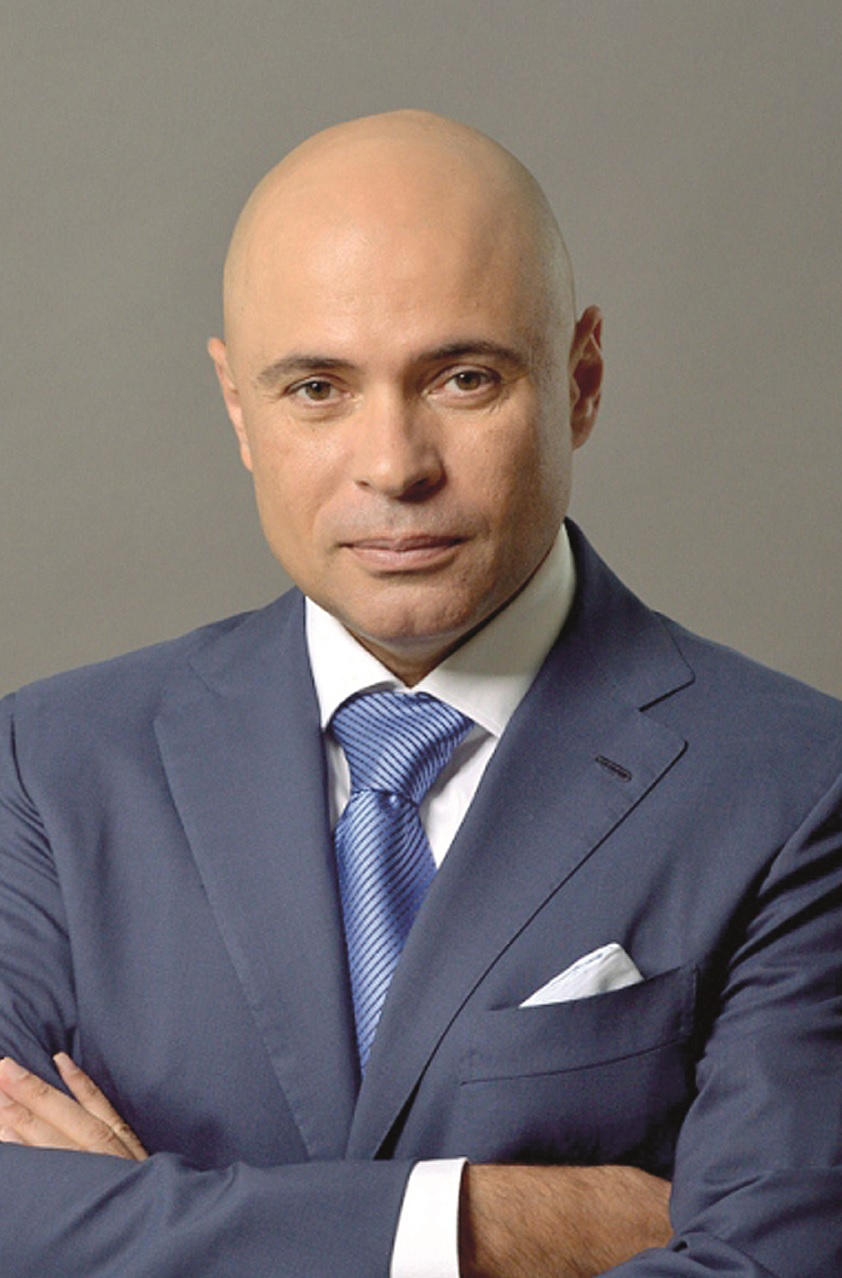
- Artamonov in 2018

4th Governor of Lipetsk Oblast
- Incumbent
- Assumed office 13 September 2019; Acting: 2 October 2018 – 13 September 2019
- Preceded by: Oleg Korolyov

Personal details
- Born: Igor Georgiyevich Artamonov; 14 March 1967 (age 59) Budyonnovsk, Stavropol Krai, Russian SFSR, Soviet Union
- Party: United Russia

Igor Georgievich Artamonov (Russian: Игорь Георгиевич Артамонов; born March 14, 1967) is a Russian politician serving as Governor of Lipetsk Oblast since 2 October 2018.

== Biography ==
Artamonov was trained in the human resources management development program of the Russian Presidential Academy of National Economy and Public Administration.

He was awarded the Order "For Merit to the Fatherland" II class by presidential decree of Vladimir Putin in 2011. In 2018 he received the Order of Honour.

== Personal life ==
Artamonov is married to Natalya Artamonova. The couple has two children:

- Son — previously worked at Sberbank; since 2019, he has been engaged in biotechnology.
- Daughter — as of 2019, she was a school student.

=== Sanctions ===
He was sanctioned by Canada under the Special Economic Measures Act (S.C. 1992, c. 17) in relation to the Russian invasion of Ukraine for Grave Breach of International Peace and Security, and by the British government in 2022 following the start of the Russian invasion of Ukraine.

== Awards ==
- Medal of the Order “For Merit to the Fatherland,” 2nd class
- Order of Honour of the Russian Federation (2018)
