= Lipetsk Oblast =

First-level administrative division of Russia

Lipetsk Oblast Липецкая область (Russian)
- Oblast
- Flag Coat of arms

- Coordinates: 52°42′N 39°09′E
- Country: Russia
- Federal district: Central
- Economic region: Central Black Earth
- Established: January 6, 1954
- Administrative center: Lipetsk

Government
  - Body: Oblast Council of Deputies
  - Head: Igor Artamonov

Area
  - Total: 24,047 km^{2} (9,285 sq mi)
  - Rank: 71st

Population (2021 census)
  - Total: 1,143,224
  - Estimate (2018): 1,150,201
  - Rank: 43rd
  - Density: 47.541/km^{2} (123.13/sq mi)
  - Urban: 63.1%
  - Rural: 36.9%

GDP (nominal, 2024)
  - Total: ₽1.05 trillion (US$12.26 billion)
  - Per capita: ₽939,205 (US$11,020.82)
- Time zone: UTC+3 (MSK)
- ISO 3166 code: RU-LIP
- License plates: 48
- OKTMO ID: 42000000
- Official languages: Russian
- Website: http://admlip.ru/

Lipetsk Oblast (Note: Russian: Ли́пецкая о́бласть, IPA: [ˈlʲipʲɪtskəjə ˈobɫəsʲtʲ]) is a federal subject of Russia (an oblast). Its administrative center is the city of Lipetsk. As of the 2021 Census, its population was 1,143,224.

== Geography ==
Lipetsk Oblast borders with Ryazan Oblast (NE), Tambov Oblast (E), Voronezh Oblast (S), Kursk Oblast (SW), Oryol Oblast (W), and Tula Oblast (NW).

== History ==
According to archaeologists and historians, the territory of the modern Lipetsk Oblast has been inhabited since ancient times. The Don Slavs were probably the first Slavic tribe to settle the area. After the disintegration of the Kievan Rus, the area belonged to the Principality of Chernigov.

When the Mongol hordes invaded the area in the 1230s, it had the following settlements: Yelets (the most important city), Dobrinsk (presumed to be the village of Dobroye), Dubok (presumed to be the village Dubki) (Dankovsky District), Staroye Gorodische (presumably Bogorodskoye of the Dankovsky district), Vorgol, Onuza, Voronozh, Lipets and others. The latter four towns were destroyed by the invaders.

Taking advantage of the weakness of the Principality of Chernigov, the Principality of Ryazan seized all the lands of the upper Don (including the basin of the Voronezh River) and annexed them. The newly acquired territories in the south of the principality were sometimes referred to as the "Ryazan ukraine" (outland). Yelets, however, had its own princes in the late 14th century. One of these, Fyodor Ivanovich, unsuccessfully tried to defend his town from Tamerlane (who was pursuing, in 1395, his enemy Tokhtamysh through the forest-steppe).

The revival of the territory began after the expulsion of the nomads. In a relatively short period of time (end of the 16th and early 17th centuries) several forts were established by the Tsardom of Russia.

In the 18th century, the creation of the navy and the regular army increased the need for flax, hemp and wool. So begins to actively develop agriculture.

The 18th century saw the continued growth of large land estates. Lipetsk region, with its rich black earth, was the breadbasket of the Russian state. Subsequently, it became widely known as a resort town, mainly because of its mineral waters.

During the February Revolution, the October Revolution of 1917 and the Russian Civil War, the lives of many cultural values, private collections of art and literature, but because of the ensuing repression against the church and the "bourgeois past" seriously affected the architectural ensembles of the estates of the nobility, monasteries and churches.

The modern oblast was formed by the decree of the Presidium of the Supreme Soviet of the USSR on January 6, 1954 from parts of Voronezh, Ryazan, Tambov, Tula and Oryol Oblasts.

== Politics ==
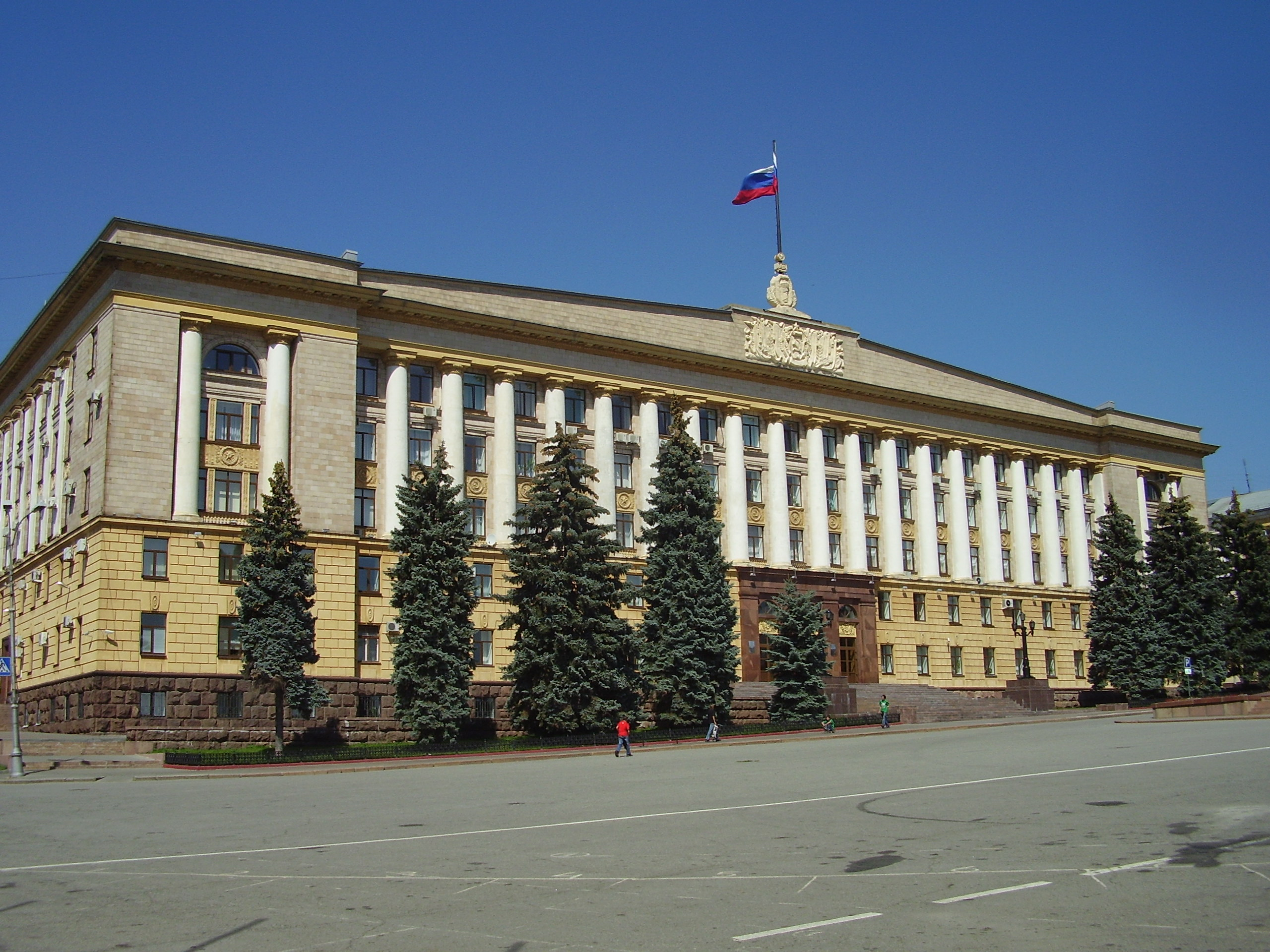
Seat of the government of Lipetsk Oblast

During the Soviet period, the high authority in the oblast was shared between three persons: The first secretary of the Lipetsk CPSU Committee (who in reality had the biggest authority), the chairman of the oblast Soviet (legislative power), and the chairman of the oblast Executive Committee (executive power). Since 1991, CPSU lost all the power, and the head of the Oblast administration, and eventually the governor was appointed/elected alongside elected regional parliament.

The Charter of Lipetsk Oblast is the fundamental law of the region. The current charter was adopted on 27 March, 2003. The Lipetsk Oblast Council of Deputies is the province's standing legislative (representative) body. The Council of Deputies consists of 56 deputies elected for a five-year term by the Oblast's inhabitants and exercises its authority by passing laws, resolutions, and other legal acts and by supervising the implementation and observance of the laws and other legal acts passed by it. The current head of the Council of Deputies is Pavel Putilin.

The highest executive body is the Oblast Government, which includes territorial executive bodies such as district administrations, committees, and commissions that facilitate development and run the day to day matters of the province. The Oblast administration supports the activities of the Governor who is the highest official, who is elected by the Oblast's inhabitants for a five year term and acts as guarantor of the observance of the oblast Charter in accordance with the Constitution of Russia.

Since 2019, the Governor is Igor Artamonov.

Representatives of the Lipetsk Oblast in the Federation Council of the Federal Assembly of the Russian Federation are:

- Maksim Kavdzharadze — a representative of the legislative (representative) body of state power of the Lipetsk Oblast;
- Oksana Khlyakina — representative from the executive body of state power of the Lipetsk Oblast.

Representatives of the Lipetsk Oblast in the State Duma of the Federal Assembly of the Russian Federation are:

- Nikolay Bortsov (United Russia);
- Mikhail Tarasenko (United Russia);
- Darya Lukina (United Russia);
- Mikhail Gulevsky (United Russia).

== Economy ==
The most important industrial branches are the iron processing and the mechanical engineering. The most industrialized cities are Lipetsk, the administrative center, and Yelets. The region's fuel and energy complex is represented by petroleum product marketing companies, a network of consumer gas pipelines, and a power grid.

The largest companies in the region include NLMK (revenues of $7.06 billion in 2017), Cherkizovo Pig Farming ($421.65 million), JSC Progress (baby food manufacturer$, 347.94 million), and the local branch of Indesit ($342.8 million).

=== Agriculture ===
Crop cultivation and horticulture form the basis of the region's agriculture. Livestock farming specializes in cattle, pigs, goats, sheep, and poultry. The processing industry is also well developed.

== Demographics ==
Historical population
Year	Pop.	±%
1959	1,141,567	—
1970	1,224,344	+7.3%
1979	1,224,653	+0.0%
1989	1,230,220	+0.5%
2002	1,213,499	−1.4%
2010	1,173,513	−3.3%
2021	1,143,224	−2.6%
Source: Census data

Population: 1,143,224 (2021 census); 1,173,513 (2010 census); 1,213,499 (2002 census); 1,230,220 (1989 Soviet census).

Vital statistics for 2024:

- Births: 7,402 (6.7 per 1,000)
- Deaths: 16,247 (14.6 per 1,000)

Total fertility rate (2024):
1.18 children per woman

Life expectancy (2021):
Total — 68.58 years (male — 63.89, female — 73.30)

Ethnic composition (2010):

- Russians: 96.3%
- Ukrainians: 0.9%
- Armenians: 0.6%
- Azerbaijanis: 0.3%
- Others: 1.9%
- 45,268 people were registered from administrative databases, and could not declare an ethnicity. It is estimated that the proportion of ethnicities in this group is the same as that of the declared group.

=== Religion ===
Religion in Lipetsk Oblast as of 2012 (Sreda Arena Atlas)
Russian Orthodoxy	71.3%
Protestantism	0.6%
Other Christians	3.4%
Islam	1.2%
Rodnovery and other native faiths	0.6%
Spiritual but not religious	14.5%
Atheism and irreligion	5.6%
Other and undeclared	2.8%

According to a 2012 survey 71.3% of the population of Lipetsk Oblast adheres to the Russian Orthodox Church, 3% are unaffiliated generic Christians, 1% are Muslims, and 1% of the population adheres to the Slavic native faith (Rodnovery) movement. In addition, 15% of the population declares to be "spiritual but not religious", 6% is atheist, and 2.7% follows other religions or did not give an answer to the question.

== Attractions ==
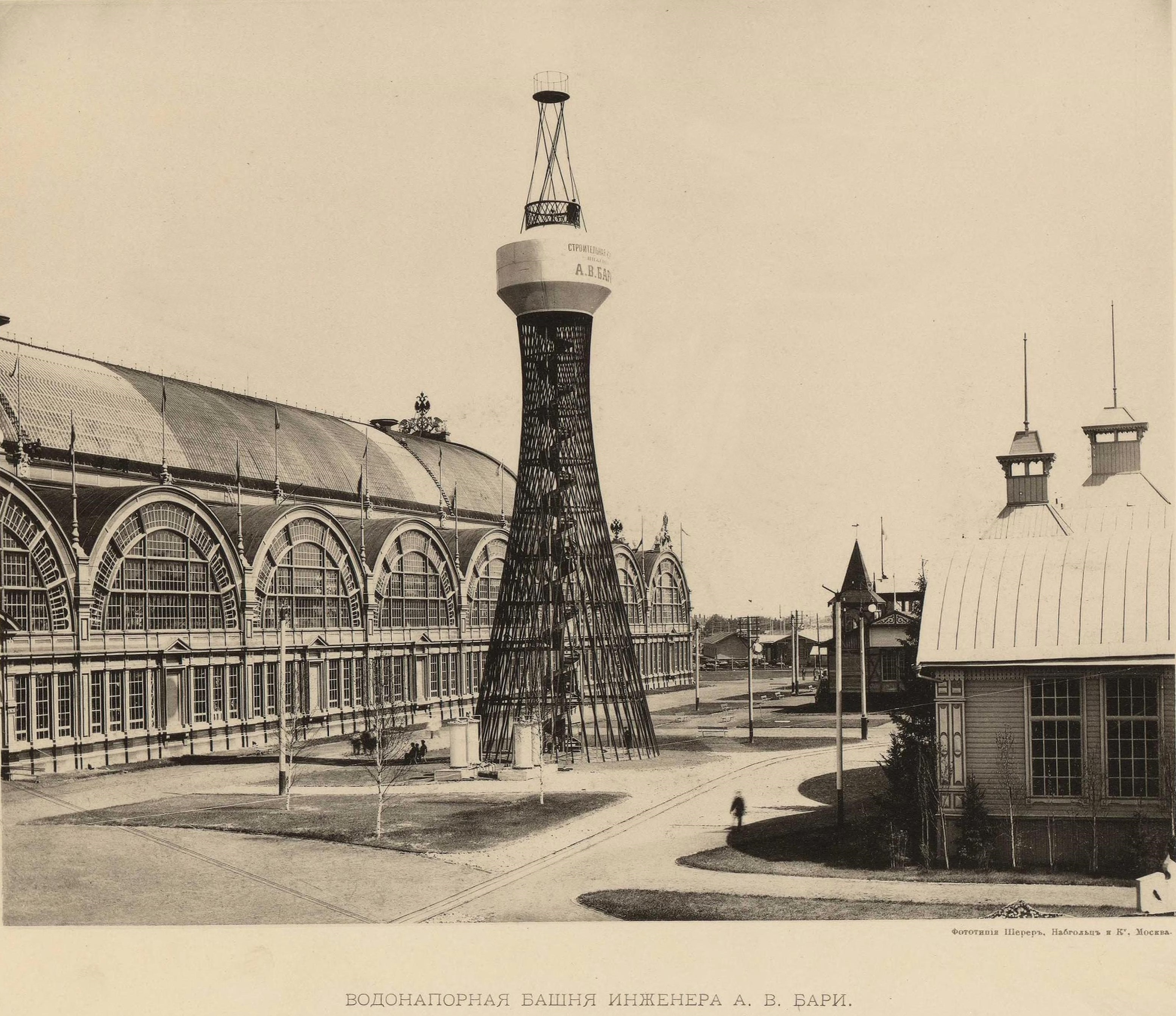
The world's first hyperboloid structure by Vladimir Shukhov

The world's first hyperboloid structure—a steel open-work lattice tower—is located in Polibino, Dankovsky District of Lipetsk Oblast. The hyperboloid tower was built and patented in 1896 by the famous Russian engineer and scientist Vladimir Shukhov. The hyperboloid structures were subsequently built by other architects, such as Antoni Gaudí, Le Corbusier, and Oscar Niemeyer.

== Sources ==
- Липецкий областной Совет депутатов. №46-ОЗ 9 апреля 2003 г. «Устав Липецкой области», в ред. Закона №329-ОЗ от 5 декабря 2014 г. «О поправках к Уставу Липецкой области Российской Федерации». Опубликован: "Липецкая газета", №71, 17 апреля 2003 г. (Lipetsk Oblast Council of Deputies. Law #46-OZ of April 9, 2003 Charter of Lipetsk Oblast, as amended by the Law #329-OZ of December 5, 2014 On the Amendments to the Charter of Lipetsk Oblast of the Russian Federation. ).
- Президиум Верховного Совета СССР. Указ от 6 января 1954 г. «Об образовании в составе РСФСР Липецкой области». (Presidium of the Supreme Soviet of the USSR. Decree of January 6, 1954 On Establishing Lipetsk Oblast Within the RSFSR. ).
