= Lipetsk Oblast Council of Deputies =

Regional parliament of Lipetsk Oblast, Russia

Lipetsk Oblast Council of Deputies Липецкий областной совет депутатов
- 7th legislature

Type
- Type: Unicameral

Leadership
- Chairman: Dmitry Averov, United Russia since 1 October 2021

Structure
- Seats: 42
- Political groups: United Russia (23) CPRF (15); LDPR (1); SRZP (1); New People (1) RPPSJ (1)

Elections
- Voting system: Mixed
- Last election: 19 September 2021
- Next election: 2026

Meeting place
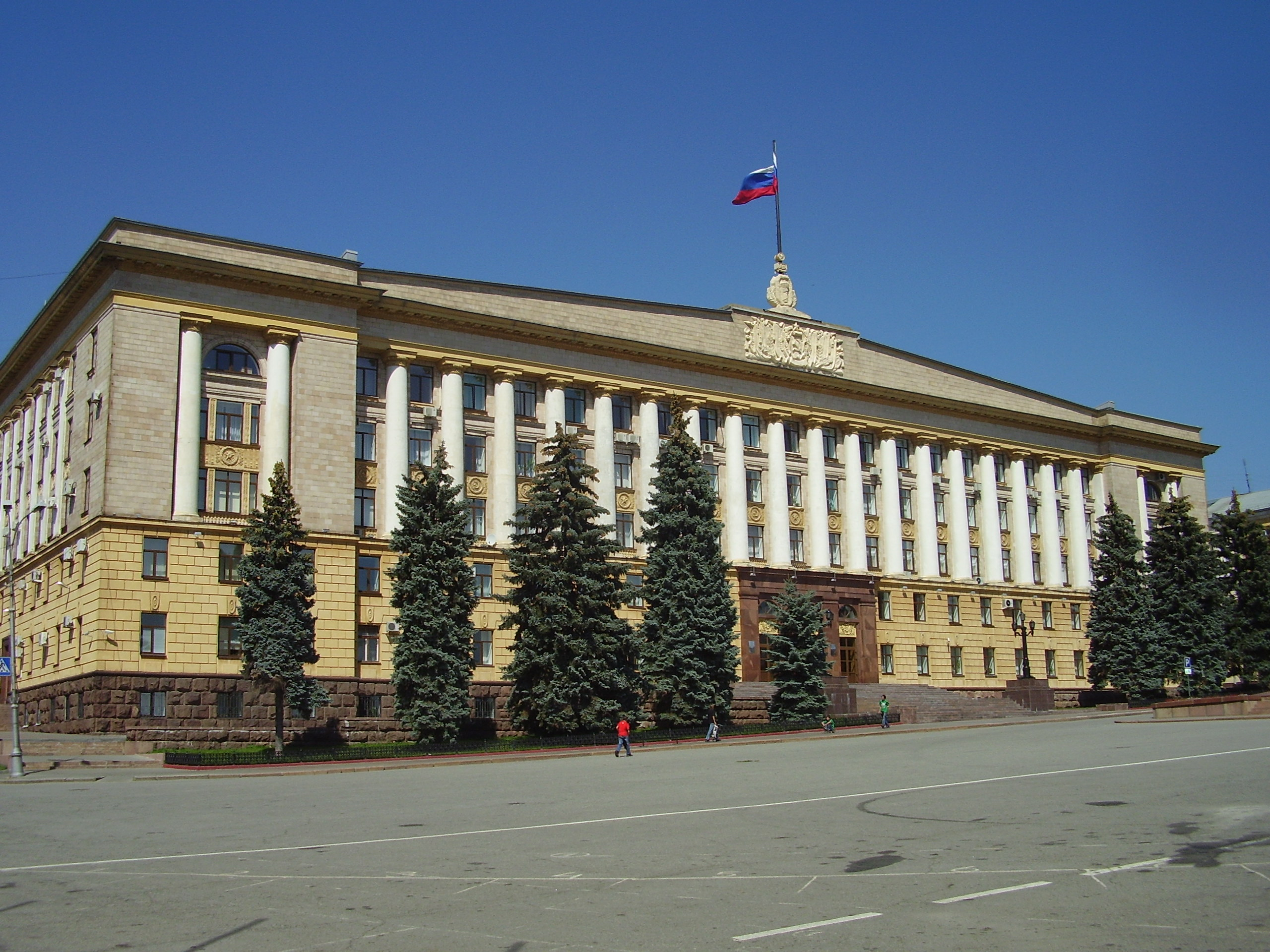
- 1 Sobornaya Square, Lipetsk

Website
- www.oblsovet.ru

The Lipetsk Oblast Council of Deputies (Russian: Липецкий областной совет депутатов, romanized: Lipetsky oblastnoy sovet deputatov) is the regional parliament of Lipetsk Oblast, a federal subject of Russia. A total of 42 deputies are elected for five-year terms.

== Elections ==
=== 2016 ===
Party	%	Seats
United Russia	53.88	46
Communist Party of the Russian Federation	13.67	4
Liberal Democratic Party of Russia	12.05	4
A Just Russia	7.21	2
Russian Party of Pensioners for Social Justice	4.68	0
Communists of Russia	2.67	0
Yabloko	1.69	0
Patriots of Russia	0.95	0
Registered voters/turnout	52.08	

=== 2021 ===
Party	%	Seats (Note: Reduced from 56 seats to 42 seats)
United Russia	46.42	23
Communist Party of the Russian Federation	19.67	15
Liberal Democratic Party of Russia	8.25	1
A Just Russia — For Truth	6.43	1
Russian Party of Pensioners for Social Justice	5.22	1
New People	5.11	1
Communists of Russia	3.25	0
Russian Ecological Party "The Greens"	1.68	0
Rodina	1.30	0
Registered voters/turnout	51.75	
