= 2025 Rostov Oblast gubernatorial election =

← 2020	12–14 September 2025	2030 →
- Turnout: 60.92% ▲18.23 pp
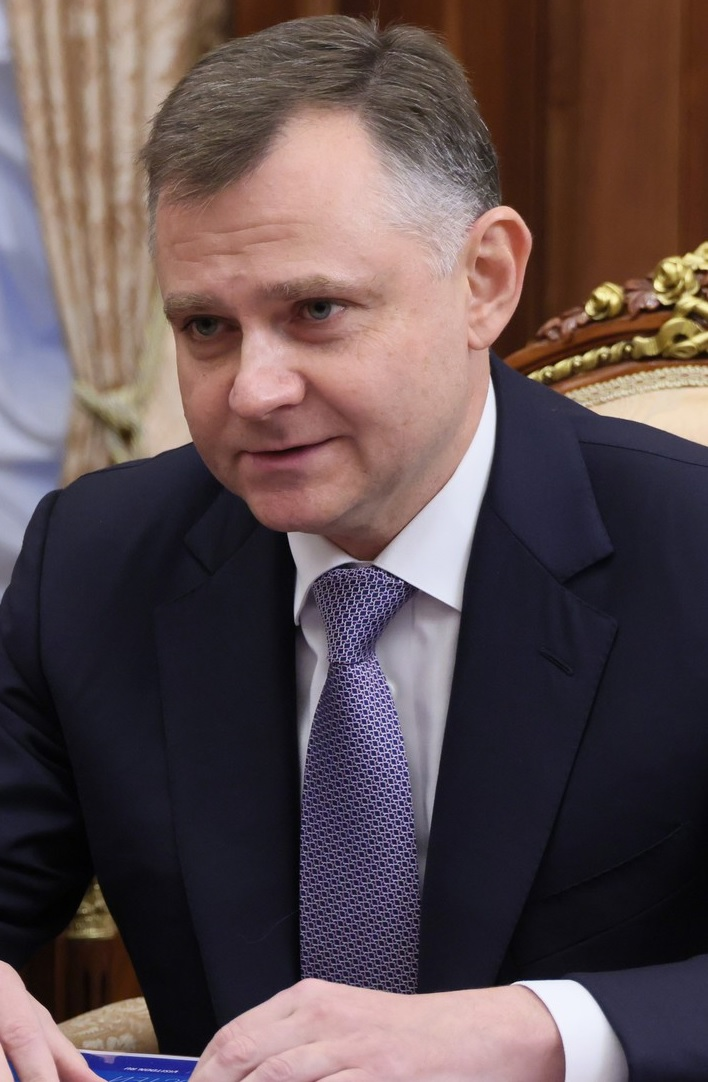

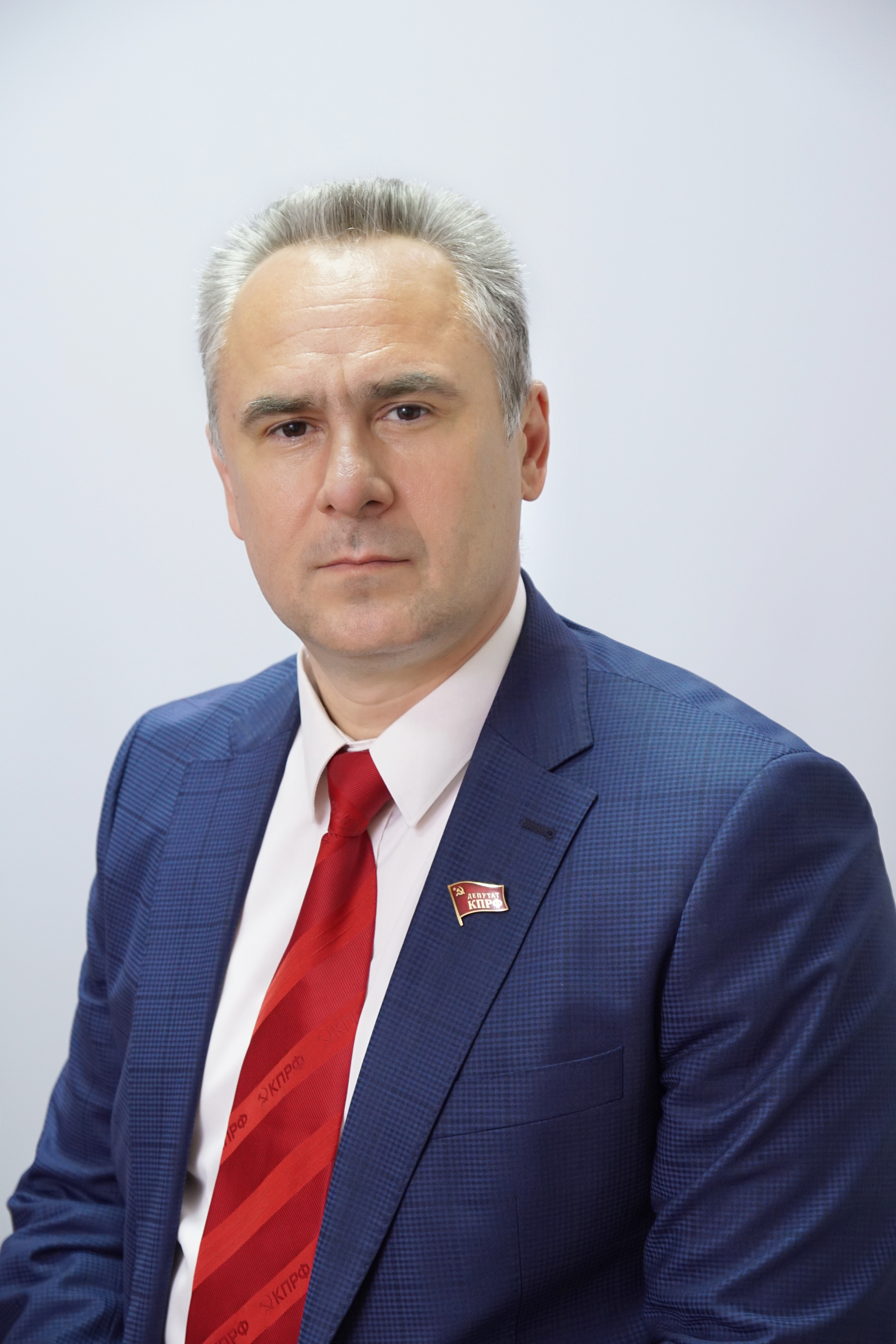
Candidate	Yury Slyusar	Yevgeny Bessonov
Party	United Russia	CPRF
Popular vote	1,544,506	174,309
Percentage	81.25%	9.17%
Governor before election
Yury Slyusar (acting)
United Russia
Governor-elect
Yury Slyusar
United Russia

The 2025 Rostov Oblast gubernatorial election took place on 12–14 September 2025, on common election day. Acting Governor of Rostov Oblast Yury Slyusar was elected for a full term in office.

== Background ==
Vasily Golubev, Head of Administration of Leninsky District in Moscow Oblast, was elected Governor of Rostov Oblast in June 2010 by the Legislative Assembly of Rostov Oblast, replacing retiring four-term incumbent Vladimir Chub. Golubev ran for re-election in 2015 and 2020, winning with 78.21% and 65.53% of the vote respectively.

In 2024 Golubev was rumoured to resign early ahead of the 2025 election. On November 4, 2024, Golubev announced his resignation and later that day President of Russia Vladimir Putin appointed United Aircraft Corporation CEO Yury Slyusar as acting Governor of Rostov Oblast. Experts mostly cited Golubev's long tenure in office as the main reason for his resignation (he was third longest-serving governor at the time of his resignation), however, declining approval ratings might also be the deciding factor. Later in November 2024 Golubev was appointed to the Federation Council by the Legislative Assembly of Rostov Oblast, replacing incumbent Senator Irina Rukavishnikova.

== Candidates ==
In Rostov Oblast candidates for Governor of Rostov Oblast can be nominated only by registered political parties. Candidate for Governor of Rostov Oblast should be a Russian citizen and at least 30 years old. Candidates for Governor of Rostov Oblast should not have a foreign citizenship or residence permit. Each candidate in order to be registered is required to collect at least 5% of signatures of members and heads of municipalities. Also gubernatorial candidates present 3 candidacies to the Federation Council and election winner later appoints one of the presented candidates.

Candidate name, political party	Occupation	Status	Ref.
Yevgeny Bessonov; Communist Party	Member of State Duma (2021–present); 2020 gubernatorial candidate	Registered	
Denis Frash; Liberal Democratic Party	Member of Legislative Assembly of Rostov Oblast (2023–present); Businessman	Registered	
Yury Klimchenko; Party of Pensioners	Pensioner; 2024 Murmansk Oblast gubernatorial candidate	Registered	
Sergey Kosinov; SR–ZP	Former Member of Legislative Assembly of Rostov Oblast (2013–2023)	Registered	
Yury Slyusar; United Russia	Acting Governor of Rostov Oblast (2024–present); Former general director of United Aircraft Corporation (2019–2024)	Registered	

=== Eliminated in the primary ===
- Arkady Gershman (United Russia), former Member of City Duma of Shakhty (2015–2020), businessman
- Maksim Zakharov (United Russia), Member of Assembly of Deputies of Neklinovsky District (2016–present), businessman

=== Declined ===
- Konstantin Babkin (LDPR), owner of Rostselmash, Empils and Buhler Industries, former chairman of the Party of Business (2010–2024)

=== Candidates for Federation Council ===
Head candidate, political party	Candidates for Federation Council	Status
Yury Slyusar; United Russia	* Aleksandr Ishchenko, Chairman of the Legislative Assembly of Rostov Oblast (2016–present) * Tatyana Karasyova, Defenders of the Fatherland state fund regional director * Andrey Yatskin, incumbent Senator (2020–present), First Deputy Chairman of the Federation Council (2020–present)	Registered

== Finances ==
All sums are in rubles.

Financial Report	Source	Bessonov	Frash	Klimchenko	Kosinov	Slyusar
First		1,000,000	500,000	5,500,000	1,352,000	61,850,000
Final		3,134,350	2,698,500	5,500,000	2,069,489	62,600,000

== Polls ==
Fieldwork date	Polling firm	Slyusar	Bessonov	Frash	Kosinov	Klimchenko	Lead
14 September 2025	2025 election	81.3	9.2	3.5	2.9	2.6	72.1
9–22 August 2025	FOM	79.4	9.3	5.7	3.3	1.2	70.1

== Results ==
Summary of the 12–14 September 2025 Rostov Oblast gubernatorial election results
Candidate	Party	Votes	%
Yury Slyusar (incumbent)	United Russia	1,544,506	81.25
Yevgeny Bessonov	Communist Party	174,309	9.17
Denis Frash	Liberal Democratic Party	66,038	3.47
Sergey Kosinov	A Just Russia – For Truth	54,776	2.88
Yury Klimchenko	Party of Pensioners	48,474	2.55
Valid votes		1,888,103	99.32
Blank ballots		12,933	0.68
Total		1,901,042	100.00
Turnout		1,901,042	60.92
Registered voters		3,120,763	100.00

Governor Slyusar re-appointed incumbent Senator Andrey Yatskin (United Russia) to the Federation Council.

== See also ==
- 2025 Russian regional elections
