= 2023 Rostov Oblast Legislative Assembly election =

2023 Russian election

← 2018	8–10 September 2023	2028 →
- Turnout: 42.78%
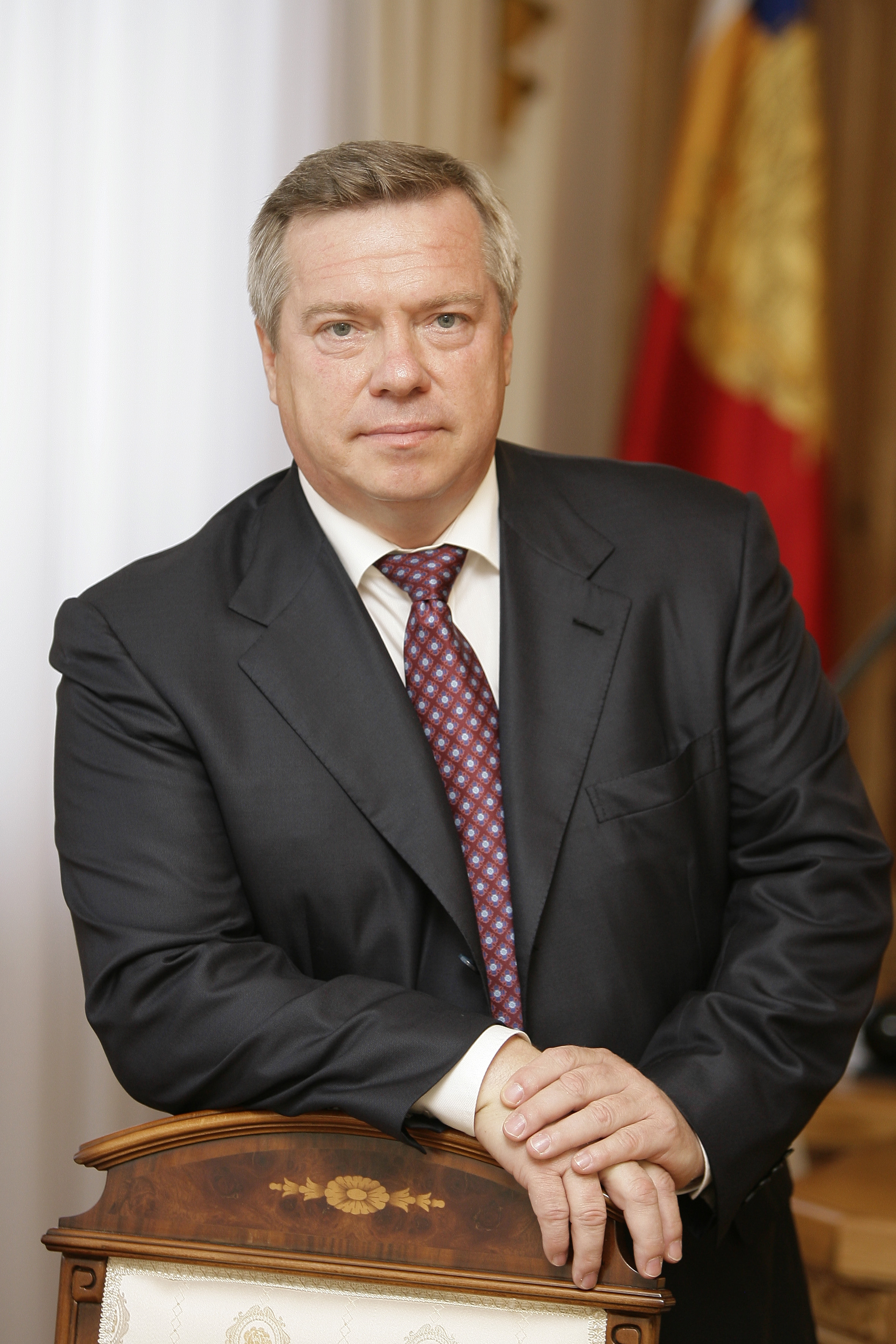

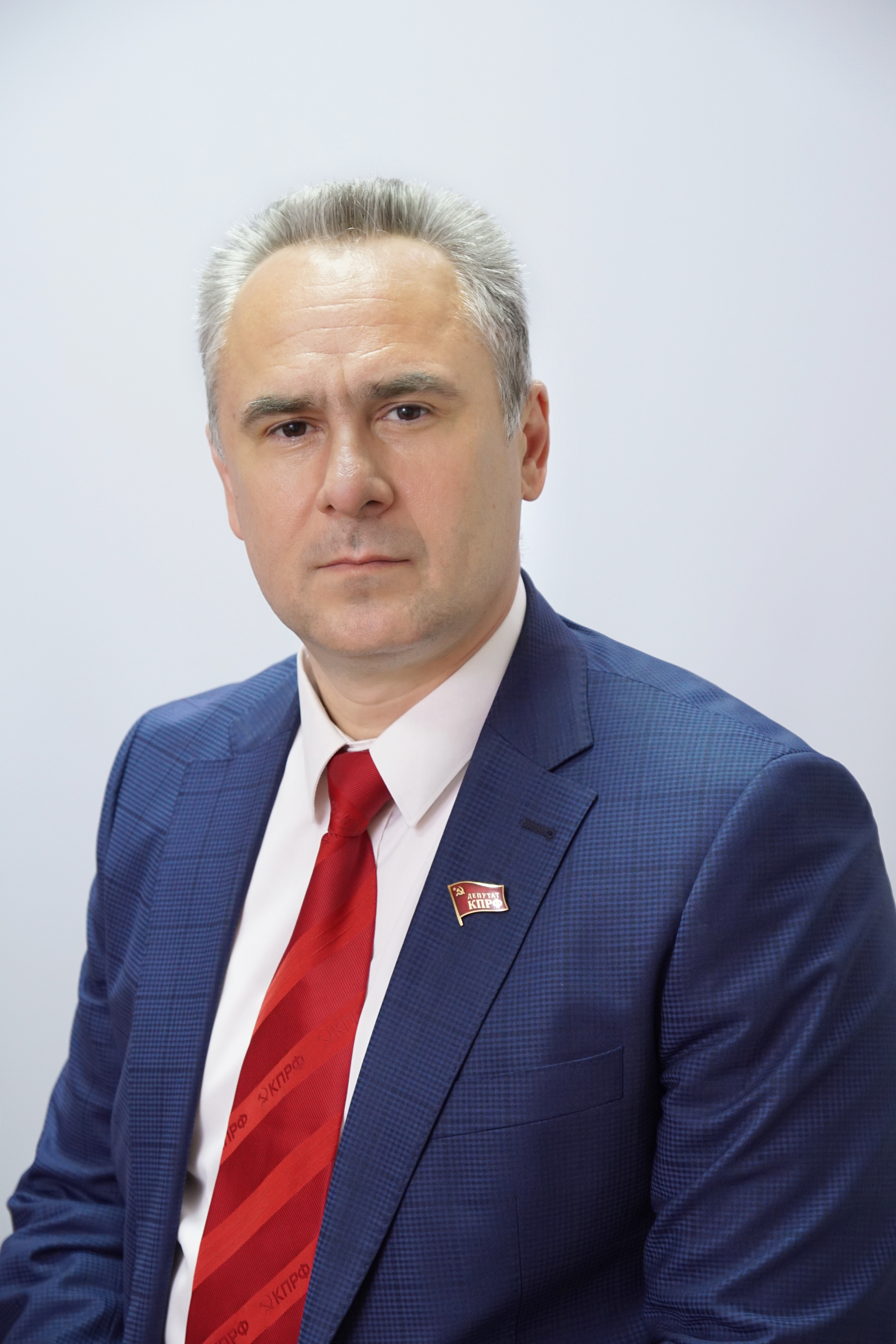

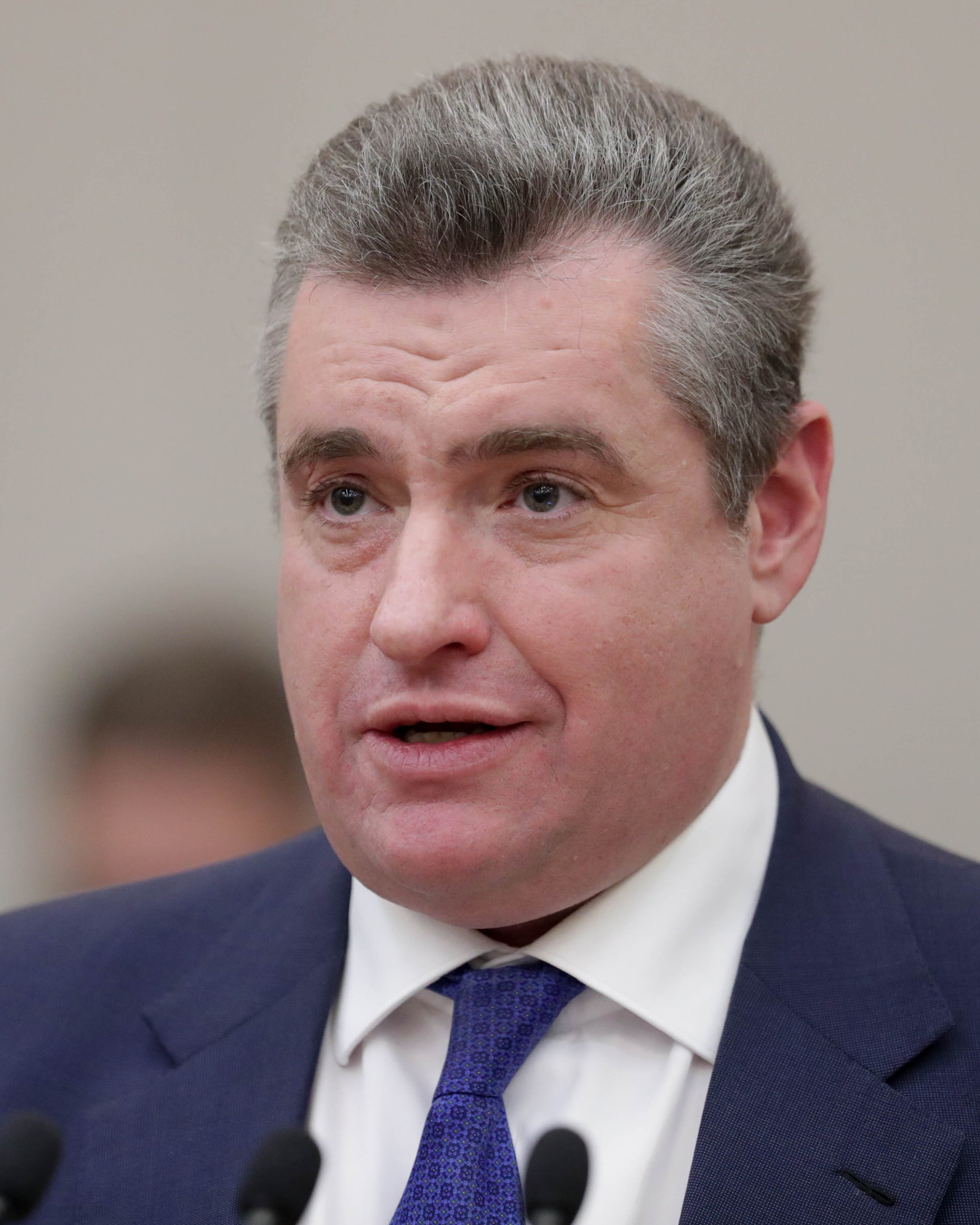
	Majority party	Minority party	Third party
Candidate	Vasily Golubev	Yevgeny Bessonov	Leonid Slutsky
Leader	Dmitry Medvedev	Gennady Zyuganov	Leonid Slutsky
Party	United Russia	CPRF	LDPR
Last election	46 seats, 56.98%	8 seats, 17.13%	2 seats, 9.87%
Seats won	54	2	2
Seat change	▲8	▼6	Steady
Popular vote	925,846	155,523	93,835
Percentage	68.28%	11.47%	6.92%
Swing	▲11.30%	▼5.66%	▼2.95%
	Fourth party	Fifth party	Sixth party
	SR-ZP	NL	CPCR
Candidate	Sergey Kosinov	Aleksandr Chukhlebov	Yevgeny Sutormin
Leader	Sergey Mironov	Aleksey Nechayev	Sergey Malinkovich
Party	SR-ZP	New People	Communists of Russia
Last election	2 seats, 7.06%	Did not exist	1 seat, 5.06%
Seats won	1	0	0
Seat change	▼1	Did not exist	▼1
Popular vote	65,188	51,326	44,373
Percentage	4.81%	3.79%	3.27%
Swing	▼2.25%	Did not exist	▼1.79%

The 2023 Legislative Assembly of Rostov Oblast election took place on 8–10 September 2023, on common election day. All 60 seats in the Legislative Assembly were up for reelection.

== Electoral system ==
Under current election laws, the Legislative Assembly is elected for a term of five years, with parallel voting. 20 seats are elected by party-list proportional representation with a 5% electoral threshold, with the other half elected in 40 single-member constituencies by first-past-the-post voting. Until 2023 the number of mandates allocated in proportional and majoritarian parts were standing at 30 each. Seats in the proportional part are allocated using the Imperiali quota, modified to ensure that every party list, which passes the threshold, receives at least one mandate.

== Candidates ==
=== Party lists ===
To register regional lists of candidates, parties need to collect 0.5% of signatures of all registered voters in Rostov Oblast.

The following parties were relieved from the necessity to collect signatures:

- United Russia
- Communist Party of the Russian Federation
- A Just Russia — Patriots — For Truth
- Liberal Democratic Party of Russia
- New People
- Communists of Russia

№	Party	Oblast-wide list	Candidates	Territorial groups	Status
1	Communists of Russia	Yevgeny Sutormin • Dmitry Krotov • Dmitry Nikolayevsky	63	20	Registered
2	Liberal Democratic Party	Leonid Slutsky • Denis Frash • Roman Vodolazov	63	20	Registered
3	New People	Aleksandr Chukhlebov • German Zaporozhchenko	62	20	Registered
4	A Just Russia – For Truth	Sergey Kosinov • Boris Valter • Aleksey Lyashchenko	63	20	Registered
5	United Russia	Vasily Golubev • Boris Gurkin • Dmitry Suvorov	60	20	Registered
6	Communist Party	Yevgeny Bessonov • Aleksey Misan • Grigory Fomenko	62	20	Registered
	Rodina	Anatoly Kotlyarov	33	16	Failed the certification

New People will take part in Rostov Oblast legislative election for the first time, while Party of Pensioners of Russia and People's Alliance, who took part in the last legislative election, had been dissolved prior.

=== Single-mandate constituencies ===
40 single-mandate constituencies were formed in Rostov Oblast, an increase of 10 seats since last redistricting in 2018. To register candidates in single-mandate constituencies need to collect 3% of signatures of registered voters in the constituency.

Number of candidates in single-mandate constituencies
Party	Candidates	
Party	Nominated	Registered
United Russia	40	37
Communist Party	40	37
Liberal Democratic Party	40	39
A Just Russia — For Truth	39	37
Communists of Russia	34	33
New People	40	40
Independent	10	2
Total	243	225

== Results ==
=== Results by party lists ===
Summary of the 8–10 September 2023 Legislative Assembly of Rostov Oblast election results
Party	Party list					Constituency		Total	
Party	Votes	%	±pp	Seats	+/–	Seats	+/–	Seats	+/–
United Russia	925,846	68.28	▲11.30%	17	▼4	37	▲12	54	▲8
Communist Party	155,523	11.47	▼5.66%	2	▼3	0	▼3	2	▼6
Liberal Democratic Party	93,835	6.92	▼2.95%	1	▼1	1	▲1	2	Steady
A Just Russia — For Truth	65,188	4.81	▼2.25%	0	▼1	1	Steady	1	▼1
New People	51,326	3.79	New	0	New	0	New	0	New
Communists of Russia	44,373	3.27	▼1.79%	0	▼1	0	Steady	0	▼1
Independents	–	–	–	–	–	1	▲1	1	▲1
Invalid ballots	19,859	1.46	▼0.59%	—	—	—	—	—	—
Total	1,355,965	100.00	—	20	▼10	40	▲10	60	Steady
Turnout	1,355,965	42.78	▼2.64%	—	—	—	—	—	—
Registered voters	3,169,309	100.00	—	—	—	—	—	—	—

Aleksandr Ischenko (United Russia) was re-elected as Chairman of the Legislative Assembly, while Senator Irina Rukavishnikova (United Russia / Independent) was re-appointed to the Federation Council.

=== Results in single-member constituencies ===
==== District 1 ====
Summary of the 8–10 September 2023 Legislative Assembly of Rostov Oblast election in Sholokhovsky constituency No.1
Candidate	Party	Votes	%
Pavel Berezhnoy (incumbent)	United Russia	44,511	81.61%
Aleksandr Zelenin	Communist Party	4,303	7.89%
Aleksandr Yevdokimov	Communists of Russia	1,996	3.66%
Konstantin Kondratyev	Liberal Democratic Party	1,981	3.63%
Denis Izmaylov	New People	1,102	2.02%
Total		54,539	100%

==== District 2 ====
Summary of the 8–10 September 2023 Legislative Assembly of Rostov Oblast election in Kasharsky constituency No.2
Candidate	Party	Votes	%
Vyacheslav Vasilenko (incumbent)	United Russia	32,132	75.65%
Vitaly Abakumov	Communist Party	4,203	9.90%
Aleksandr Lyubomishchenko	A Just Russia — For Truth	1,767	4.16%
Artyom Maly	Liberal Democratic Party	1,654	3.89%
Yevgeny Prozorov	Communists of Russia	1,181	2.78%
Aleksandr Kravchenko	New People	1,002	2.36%
Total		42,475	100%

==== District 3 ====
Summary of the 8–10 September 2023 Legislative Assembly of Rostov Oblast election in Donetsky constituency No.3
Candidate	Party	Votes	%
Yana Kurinova	United Russia	21,014	63.89%
Irina Polyakova	Communist Party	4,152	12.61%
Tatyana Mitina	A Just Russia — For Truth	2,020	6.14%
Vitaly Pikhovkin	New People	1,938	5.89%
Sergey Sorokin	Liberal Democratic Party	1,759	5.35%
Inna Politanskaya	Communists of Russia	1,310	3.98%
Total		32,892	100%

==== District 4 ====
Summary of the 8–10 September 2023 Legislative Assembly of Rostov Oblast election in Kamensky constituency No.4
Candidate	Party	Votes	%
Andrey Kurnosov	United Russia	17,751	60.48%
Yury Rotar	Communist Party	3,813	12.99%
Vladimir Kotov	Liberal Democratic Party	2,393	8.15%
Tatyana Maksimenko	Communists of Russia	2,020	6.88%
Yevgeny Batrakov	A Just Russia — For Truth	1,861	6.34%
Aleksandr Tolokov	New People	839	2.86%
Total		29,348	100%

==== District 5 ====
Summary of the 8–10 September 2023 Legislative Assembly of Rostov Oblast election in Belokalitvinsky constituency No.5
Candidate	Party	Votes	%
Andrey Kharchenko (incumbent)	United Russia	36,201	75.93%
Anatoly Sapyany	Communist Party	3,695	7.75%
Valery Kuznetsov	Liberal Democratic Party	2,996	6.28%
Maria Bakanova	A Just Russia — For Truth	2,413	5.06%
Nikolay Arkhipov	New People	1,710	3.59%
Total		47,677	100%

==== District 6 ====
Summary of the 8–10 September 2023 Legislative Assembly of Rostov Oblast election in Zverevsky constituency No.6
Candidate	Party	Votes	%
Sergey Mikhalev (incumbent)	United Russia	24,654	68.28%
Nikolay Gorbachev	Liberal Democratic Party	3,340	9.25%
Andrey Yashkin	Communist Party	2,760	7.64%
Yelena Sizyakina	New People	2,507	6.94%
Aleksey Koshkarev	Communists of Russia	2,196	6.08%
Total		36,108	100%

==== District 7 ====
Summary of the 8–10 September 2023 Legislative Assembly of Rostov Oblast election in Novoshakhtinsky constituency No.7
Candidate	Party	Votes	%
Roman Klimov	Liberal Democratic Party	18,111	58.03%
Gennady Shcherbakov	Communist Party	4,222	13.53%
Irina Kolontayenko	New People	2,977	9.54%
Aleksandr Solovyev	A Just Russia — For Truth	2,643	8.47%
Andrey Suvorov	Communists of Russia	2,152	6.90%
Total		31,210	100%

==== District 8 ====
Summary of the 8–10 September 2023 Legislative Assembly of Rostov Oblast election in Shakhtinsky Western constituency No.8
Candidate	Party	Votes	%
Irina Zhukova (incumbent)	United Russia	7,248	42.85%
Aleksandr Petin	Liberal Democratic Party	3,200	18.92%
Sergey Shapovalov	Communist Party	2,634	15.57%
Sergey Andreyanov	New People	2,055	12.15%
Vladimir Karashchenko	Communists of Russia	894	5.29%
Total		16,913	100%

==== District 9 ====
Summary of the 8–10 September 2023 Legislative Assembly of Rostov Oblast election in Shakhtinsky Eastern constituency No.9
Candidate	Party	Votes	%
Yevgeny Ponamarenko	United Russia	9,109	59.70%
Irina Levashova	Liberal Democratic Party	2,063	13.52%
Roman Babkin	Communist Party	1,686	11.05%
Yelena Kotlyarova	New People	786	5.15%
Andrey Engovatov	A Just Russia — For Truth	599	3.93%
Raisa Usoltseva	Communists of Russia	477	3.13%
Total		15,258	100%

==== District 10 ====
Summary of the 8–10 September 2023 Legislative Assembly of Rostov Oblast election in Novocherkassky constituency No.10
Candidate	Party	Votes	%
Arkady Gortsevskoy	United Russia	8,288	47.76%
Andrey Kutyrev (incumbent)	Communist Party	2,770	15.96%
Yury Buravlev	Communists of Russia	1,691	9.75%
German Zaporozhechko	New People	1,657	9.55%
Andrey Lembrikov	A Just Russia — For Truth	1,098	6.33%
Taras Sinonyan	Liberal Democratic Party	1,028	5.92%
Total		17,352	100%

==== District 11 ====
Summary of the 8–10 September 2023 Legislative Assembly of Rostov Oblast election in Oktyabrsky constituency No.11
Candidate	Party	Votes	%
Yelena Teplinskaya	United Russia	21,983	71.21%
Nikolay Pobedinsky	Communist Party	3,180	10.30%
Viktor Chebotarev	Liberal Democratic Party	2,254	7.30%
Andrey Serikov	New People	1,323	4.29%
Leonid Kubarev	Communists of Russia	859	2.78%
Aleksey Kazymov	A Just Russia — For Truth	762	2.47%
Total		30,869	100%

==== District 12 ====
Summary of the 8–10 September 2023 Legislative Assembly of Rostov Oblast election in Aksaysky Northern constituency No.12
Candidate	Party	Votes	%
Anna Andreyeva	United Russia	16,048	56.21%
Vladislav Zhuravlev	Communist Party	3,966	13.89%
Dmitry Popov	Liberal Democratic Party	3,278	11.48%
Natalya Lebedeva	New People	1,929	6.76%
Maksim Fedorov	A Just Russia — For Truth	1,711	5.99%
Mikhail Korostelev	Communists of Russia	878	3.08%
Total		28,549	100%

==== District 13 ====
Summary of the 8–10 September 2023 Legislative Assembly of Rostov Oblast election in Orlovsky constituency No.13
Candidate	Party	Votes	%
Vladimir Revenko (incumbent)	United Russia	24,667	65.63%
Aleksandr Dedovich	Communist Party	5,804	15.44%
Roman Sherstobitov	A Just Russia — For Truth	1,827	4.86%
Oksana Velikorodnyaya	Communists of Russia	1,775	4.72%
Vitaly Nikitenko	Liberal Democratic Party	1,569	4.17%
Mikhail Bykadorov	New People	1,277	3.40%
Total		37,587	100%

==== District 14 ====
Summary of the 8–10 September 2023 Legislative Assembly of Rostov Oblast election in Morozovsky constituency No.14
Candidate	Party	Votes	%
Viktor Khalyn (incumbent)	United Russia	25,754	73.67%
Dmitry Yakushkin	Communist Party	2,619	7.49%
Aleksey Plotnikov	Liberal Democratic Party	1,688	4.83%
Irina Zarutskaya	A Just Russia — For Truth	1,550	4.43%
Tatyana Belova	New People	1,531	4.38%
Yelena Malkova	Communists of Russia	1,316	3.76%
Total		34,957	100%

==== District 15 ====
Summary of the 8–10 September 2023 Legislative Assembly of Rostov Oblast election in Konstantinovsky constituency No.15
Candidate	Party	Votes	%
Vladislav Sinyov	United Russia	26,759	70.60%
Dmitry Polunin	Communist Party	2,886	7.61%
Gennady Kudryavtsev	Liberal Democratic Party	2,494	6.58%
Yelena Andreyeva	Communists of Russia	2,312	6.10%
Sergey Astashkin	A Just Russia — For Truth	1,524	4.02%
Natalia Polenova	New People	1,312	3.46%
Total		37,903	100%

==== District 16 ====
Summary of the 8–10 September 2023 Legislative Assembly of Rostov Oblast election in Volgodonsky constituency No.16
Candidate	Party	Votes	%
Maksim Gelas	United Russia	12,105	45.23%
Aleksey Misan	Communist Party	6,738	25.17%
Sergey Apanovich	A Just Russia — For Truth	2,885	10.78%
Sergey Malykhin	Liberal Democratic Party	1,546	5.78%
Yevgeny Belov	New People	1,507	5.63%
Aleksandr Vereshchak	Communists of Russia	984	3.68%
Total		26,765	100%

==== District 17 ====
Summary of the 8–10 September 2023 Legislative Assembly of Rostov Oblast election in Ust-Donetsky constituency No.17
Candidate	Party	Votes	%
Sergey Sukhovenko (incumbent)	United Russia	33,335	73.93%
Maksim Fevralev	Communist Party	5,623	12.47%
Andrey Oleynikov	A Just Russia — For Truth	2,196	4.87%
Aleksey Nefedov	Liberal Democratic Party	2,108	4.68%
Ella Natopta	New People	1,131	2.51%
Total		45,089	100%

==== District 18 ====
Summary of the 8–10 September 2023 Legislative Assembly of Rostov Oblast election in Semikarakorsky constituency No.18
Candidate	Party	Votes	%
Aleksandr Remeta	United Russia	27,685	70.43%
Sergey Krasyukov	Communist Party	4,133	10.51%
Mikhail Maksimov	Liberal Democratic Party	2,619	6.66%
Yekaterina Babkina	New People	2,044	5.20%
Lyudmila Sharova	A Just Russia — For Truth	1,923	4.89%
Total		39,310	100%

==== District 19 ====
Summary of the 8–10 September 2023 Legislative Assembly of Rostov Oblast election in Salsky constituency No.19
Candidate	Party	Votes	%
Boris Aksenov	United Russia	23,225	72.41%
Andrey Osipov	Communist Party	3,394	10.58%
Natalya Chemeris	New People	1,718	5.36%
Aleksandr Perevozchenko	Liberal Democratic Party	1,696	5.29%
Aleksandr Mishchenko	A Just Russia — For Truth	1,566	4.88%
Total		32,076	100%

==== District 20 ====
Summary of the 8–10 September 2023 Legislative Assembly of Rostov Oblast election in Peschanokopsky constituency No.20
Candidate	Party	Votes	%
Svetlana Manankina	United Russia	49,038	83.95%
Darya Kobzeva	Communist Party	4,282	7.33%
Yelena Solopova	A Just Russia — For Truth	2,100	3.60%
Denis Bondarev	Liberal Democratic Party	2,030	3.48%
Mikael Kafyan	New People	742	1.27%
Total		58,412	100%

==== District 21 ====
Summary of the 8–10 September 2023 Legislative Assembly of Rostov Oblast election in Kagalnitsky constituency No.21
Candidate	Party	Votes	%
Sergey Yaroshenko	United Russia	25,476	70.42%
Olga Zhuravleva	Communists of Russia	3,905	10.79%
Ivan Vinogradov	A Just Russia — For Truth	2,540	7.02%
Yury Ivashkov	Liberal Democratic Party	1,984	5.48%
Artyom Kafyan	New People	1,529	4.23%
Total		36,177	100%

==== District 22 ====
Summary of the 8–10 September 2023 Legislative Assembly of Rostov Oblast election in Taganrogsky constituency No.22
Candidate	Party	Votes	%
Tatyana Mikheyeva	United Russia	5,744	38.91%
Ilya Voloshchenko	Communists of Russia	2,594	17.57%
Yevgeny Khizhnyak	Liberal Democratic Party	2,322	15.73%
Larisa Ovsiyenko	A Just Russia — For Truth	2,272	15.39%
Sergey Kupay	New People	883	5.98%
Total		14,763	100%

==== District 23 ====
Summary of the 8–10 September 2023 Legislative Assembly of Rostov Oblast election in Kuybyshevsky constituency No.23
Candidate	Party	Votes	%
Sergey Bilan	Independent	21,769	68.63%
Irina Potyagova (incumbent)	Communist Party	2,814	8.87%
Ivan Gubenko	Liberal Democratic Party	2,380	7.50%
Sergey Kosinov	A Just Russia — For Truth	1,779	5.61%
Andrey Klimov	New People	1,118	3.52%
Andrey Sheludko	Communists of Russia	993	3.13%
Total		31,718	100%

==== District 24 ====
Summary of the 8–10 September 2023 Legislative Assembly of Rostov Oblast election in Matveyevo-Kurgansky constituency No.24
Candidate	Party	Votes	%
Valery Zavgorodny	United Russia	20,828	70.73%
Anatoly Polyakov	Communists of Russia	2,355	8.00%
Sergey Demidov	Liberal Democratic Party	2,045	6.94%
Viktor Grevtsev	New People	1,905	6.47%
Vladimir Starodumov	A Just Russia — For Truth	1,389	4.72%
Total		29,449	100%

==== District 25 ====
Summary of the 8–10 September 2023 Legislative Assembly of Rostov Oblast election in Neklinovsky constituency No.25
Candidate	Party	Votes	%
Stanislav Degtyarev	United Russia	20,866	65.78%
Vyacheslav Vinokurov	Liberal Democratic Party	2,492	7.86%
Oleg Kobyakov	Communists of Russia	2,308	7.28%
Viktor Remizov	Communist Party	2,223	7.01%
Vladimir Abramenko	A Just Russia — For Truth	1,997	6.30%
Andrey Drobyazko	New People	1,213	3.82%
Total		31,720	100%

==== District 26 ====
Summary of the 8–10 September 2023 Legislative Assembly of Rostov Oblast election in Rodionovo-Nesvetaysky constituency No.26
Candidate	Party	Votes	%
Aleksandr Kosachev	United Russia	23,974	66.42%
Tatyana Ivashchenko	Communist Party	4,015	11.12%
Aleksandr Budchenko	A Just Russia — For Truth	2,670	7.40%
Samvel Galstyan	Liberal Democratic Party	1,930	5.35%
Yelizaveta Guryeva	Communists of Russia	1,446	4.01%
Vladislav Madykin	New People	1,239	3.43%
Total		36,095	100%

==== District 27 ====
Summary of the 8–10 September 2023 Legislative Assembly of Rostov Oblast election in Azovsky constituency No.27
Candidate	Party	Votes	%
Vladimir Vlaznev	United Russia	11,728	51.01%
Stanislav Potakov	Communist Party	3,912	17.02%
Yury Golubev	A Just Russia — For Truth	3,230	14.05%
Igor Simakov	New People	1,923	8.36%
Nikolay Pashkov	Communists of Russia	1,557	6.77%
Total		22,991	100%

==== District 28 ====
Summary of the 8–10 September 2023 Legislative Assembly of Rostov Oblast election in Azovsky Urban constituency No.28
Candidate	Party	Votes	%
Denis Buryka	United Russia	24,439	67.66%
Nikolay Bocharov	Communist Party	3,837	10.62%
Roman Surzhenko	A Just Russia — For Truth	3,417	9.46%
Yulia Prasol	Liberal Democratic Party	1,403	3.88%
Aleksey Bondarenko	Communists of Russia	1,368	3.79%
Aleksey Velichko	New People	1,284	3.55%
Total		36,120	100%

==== District 29 ====
Summary of the 8–10 September 2023 Legislative Assembly of Rostov Oblast election in Bataysky constituency No.29
Candidate	Party	Votes	%
Boris Valter (incumbent)	A Just Russia — For Truth	26,552	55.63%
Andrey Barutenko	Communist Party	9,705	20.33%
Valery Bendin	Liberal Democratic Party	6,962	14.59%
David Apalko	New People	4,277	8.96%
Total		47,733	100%

==== District 30 ====
Summary of the 8–10 September 2023 Legislative Assembly of Rostov Oblast election in Voroshilovsky Western constituency No.30
Candidate	Party	Votes	%
Lidia Novoseltseva	United Russia	24,290	76.00%
Natalya Oskina	Communist Party	3,028	9.47%
Natalya Osadchaya	Communists of Russia	1,594	4.99%
Aleksandra Soldatova	Liberal Democratic Party	983	3.08%
Yelizaveta Dunayeva	New People	885	2.77%
Liparit Arutyunyan	A Just Russia — For Truth	806	2.52%
Total		31,962	100%

==== District 31 ====
Summary of the 8–10 September 2023 Legislative Assembly of Rostov Oblast election in Voroshilovsky Eastern constituency No.31
Candidate	Party	Votes	%
Magomed Darsigov	United Russia	22,922	74.62%
Igor Kritsky	Communist Party	3,115	10.14%
Aleksey Pelipenko	A Just Russia — For Truth	1,303	4.24%
Sergey Maslakov	Liberal Democratic Party	1,270	4.13%
Aleksey Chernousov	New People	931	3.03%
Yury Zhurkin	Communists of Russia	790	2.57%
Total		30,719	100%

==== District 32 ====
Summary of the 8–10 September 2023 Legislative Assembly of Rostov Oblast election in Kirovsky constituency No.32
Candidate	Party	Votes	%
Pavel Kuzmin	United Russia	20,450	72.16%
Aleksey Kozhevnikov	Communist Party	3,045	10.74%
Aleksandr Kozhin	A Just Russia — For Truth	1,730	6.10%
Polina Grineva	Liberal Democratic Party	1,066	3.76%
Vladislav Makhmudov	New People	965	3.41%
Yekaterina Arefyeva	Communists of Russia	787	2.78%
Total		28,340	100%

==== District 33 ====
Summary of the 8–10 September 2023 Legislative Assembly of Rostov Oblast election in Pervomaysky constituency No.33
Candidate	Party	Votes	%
Adam Batazhev (incumbent)	United Russia	22,497	68.71%
Aleksey Lyubushkin	Communist Party	5,816	17.76%
Andrey Parfenov	A Just Russia — For Truth	1,286	3.93%
Dmitry Korneyev	New People	1,135	3.47%
Karine Kocharyan	Liberal Democratic Party	1,001	3.06%
Zhanna Litvinenko	Communists of Russia	765	2.34%
Total		32,743	100%

==== District 34 ====
Summary of the 8–10 September 2023 Legislative Assembly of Rostov Oblast election in Proletarsky constituency No.34
Candidate	Party	Votes	%
Radzhiv Mirzaliyev	United Russia	17,063	69.15%
Sergey Lakisov	Communist Party	3,016	12.22%
Yelena Shishkalova	Liberal Democratic Party	1,530	6.20%
Oleg Osikov	Communists of Russia	981	3.98%
Valentin Dzhagatsbanyan	A Just Russia — For Truth	916	3.71%
Artyom Kazaryan	New People	893	3.62%
Total		24,677	100%

==== District 35 ====
Summary of the 8–10 September 2023 Legislative Assembly of Rostov Oblast election in Zheleznodorozhny constituency No.35
Candidate	Party	Votes	%
Besik Meskhi	United Russia	25,818	69.32%
Dmitry Zhivotov	Communist Party	4,892	13.14%
Boris Vakulov	A Just Russia — For Truth	2,611	7.01%
Danil Volov	Liberal Democratic Party	1,523	4.09%
Pavel Muslin	New People	1,166	3.13%
Yelena Dubinkina	Communists of Russia	947	2.54%
Total		37,242	100%

==== District 36 ====
Summary of the 8–10 September 2023 Legislative Assembly of Rostov Oblast election in Leninsky constituency No.36
Candidate	Party	Votes	%
Igor Burakov	United Russia	10,918	61.10%
Malik Mamayev	Communist Party	2,059	11.52%
German Aganson	Liberal Democratic Party	1,422	7.96%
Roman Grekhovodov	A Just Russia — For Truth	1,101	6.16%
Albert Karapetyan	New People	983	5.50%
Vladislav Mamayev	Communists of Russia	904	5.06%
Total		17,869	100%

==== District 37 ====
Summary of the 8–10 September 2023 Legislative Assembly of Rostov Oblast election in Oktyabrsky Urban constituency No.37
Candidate	Party	Votes	%
Ashot Khblikyan	United Russia	22,089	64.21%
Dmitry Galochkin	Communist Party	5,766	16.76%
Vladimir Bashkatov	A Just Russia — For Truth	1,738	5.05%
Aleksandr Blokhin	New People	1,620	4.71%
Vadim Frosh	Liberal Democratic Party	1,604	4.66%
Andrey Bondarev	Communists of Russia	1,229	3.57%
Total		34,400	100%

==== District 38 ====
Summary of the 8–10 September 2023 Legislative Assembly of Rostov Oblast election in Sovetsky Eastern constituency No.38
Candidate	Party	Votes	%
Svetlana Piskunova	United Russia	15,499	64.93%
Yevgeny Fedyayev	Independent	4,585	19.21%
Anton Redko	Communist Party	866	3.63%
Sergey Kopylov	Liberal Democratic Party	748	3.13%
Artur Rybakyan	New People	704	2.95%
Aleksey Lyashchenko	A Just Russia — For Truth	701	2.94%
Maksim Penkov	Communists of Russia	467	1.96%
Total		23,870	100%

==== District 39 ====
Summary of the 8–10 September 2023 Legislative Assembly of Rostov Oblast election in Sovetsky Western constituency No.39
Candidate	Party	Votes	%
Sergey Kovalev (incumbent)	United Russia	20,805	66.33%
Aleksey Sidorkov	Communist Party	5,232	16.68%
Maria Shestakova	New People	1,651	5.26%
Nikita Rykovsky	Liberal Democratic Party	1,541	4.91%
Viktor Gudenko	Communists of Russia	1,198	3.82%
Valery Mumdzhyan	A Just Russia — For Truth	695	2.22%
Total		31,364	100%

==== District 40 ====
Summary of the 8–10 September 2023 Legislative Assembly of Rostov Oblast election in Aksaysky Southern constituency No.40
Candidate	Party	Votes	%
Sergey Rozhkov (incumbent)	United Russia	40,305	78.17%
Valery Chernichenko	Communist Party	3,054	5.92%
Yury Blokhin	A Just Russia — For Truth	2,988	5.79%
Aleksandr Chukhlebov	New People	2,580	5.00%
Roman Vodolazov	Liberal Democratic Party	2,367	4.59%
Total		51,563	100%

== See also ==
- 2023 Russian regional elections
