= Yevgeny Bushmin =

Russian politician (1958–2019)

- Евгений Бушмин
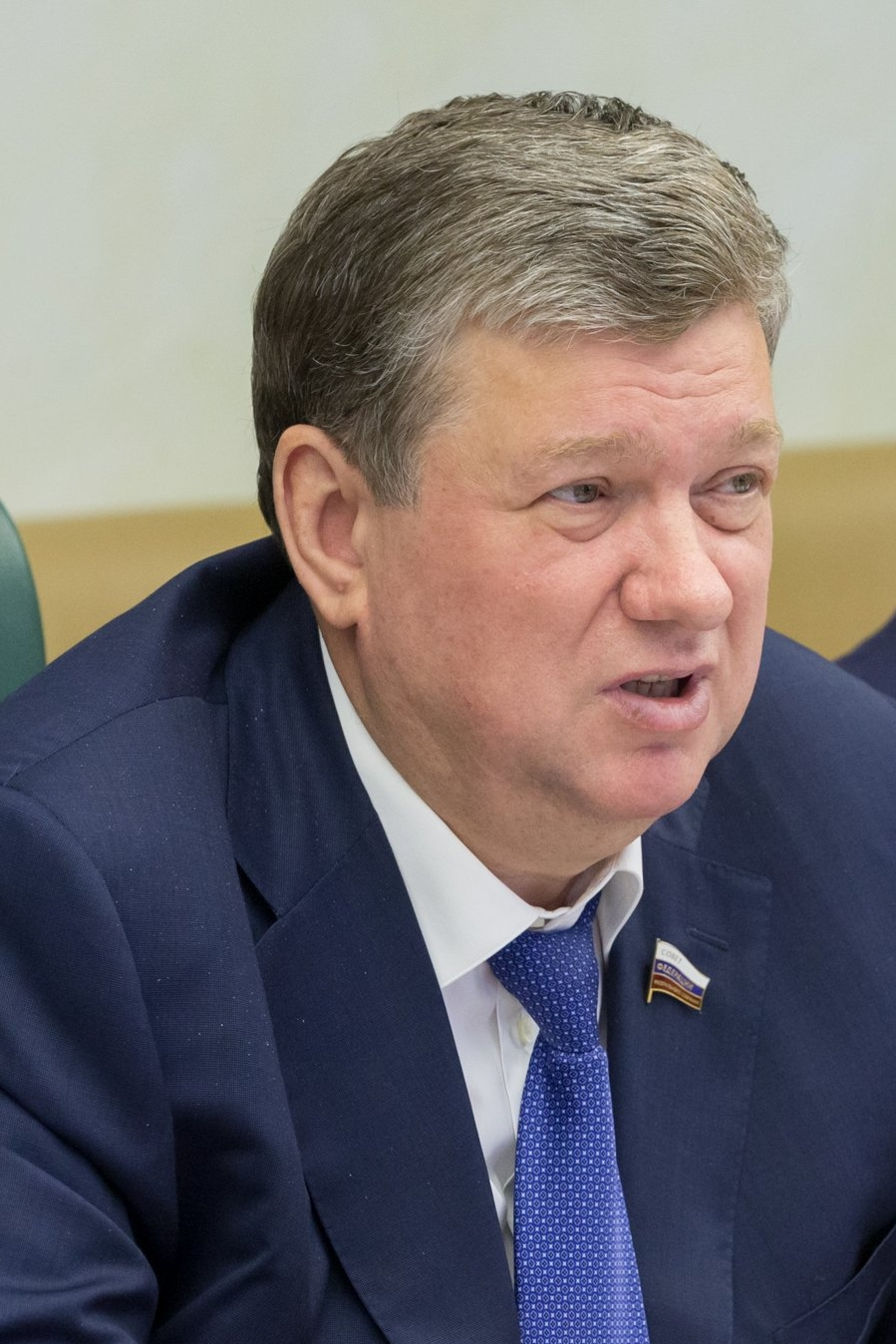
- Bushmin in 2016

Deputy Chairman of the Federation Council
- In office 27 April 2013 – 6 October 2019
- Preceded by: Svetlana Orlova
- Succeeded by: Nikolai Zhuravlev

Russian Federation Senator from Rostov Oblast
- In office 21 September 2005 – 6 October 2019
- Preceded by: Sergey Anokhin
- Succeeded by: Vladimir Lakunin

Russian Federation Senator from Nizhny Novgorod Oblast
- In office 20 November 2001 – July 2005
- Preceded by: Ivan Sklyarov
- Succeeded by: Aleksandr Podlesov

Deputy Finance Minister
- In office 26 June 1998 – 5 December 2001

Member of the State Duma
- In office 1994–1996

Personal details
- Born: 4 October 1958 Lopatino, Russian SFSR, Soviet Union
- Died: 6 October 2019 (aged 61) Central Clinical Hospital, Moscow, Russia
- Party: United Russia
- Education: Lobachevsky State University of Gorky
- Awards: Order of Alexander Nevsky; Order of Honour; Medal of the Order "For Merit to the Fatherland" Second Class; Medal "For the Return of Crimea"

Yevgeny Viktorovich Bushmin (Russian: Евгений Викторович Бушмин; 4 October 1958 – 6 October 2019) was a Russian politician. He served as a Deputy of the 1st State Duma and Deputy Finance Minister, and was the member of the Federation Council of the Federal Assembly as the representative of Nizhny Novgorod Oblast. At the time of his death he was the incumbent member of the Federation Council for Rostov Oblast, and the council's Deputy Chairman.

Born in 1958 in Gorky Oblast, Bushmin graduated from university with a speciality in economics, and went on to work on practical economic problems, later running his own company and serving as a director of another. He entered politics in 1993 with his election to the 1st State Duma, and served as part of a number of political groupings. He also sat as a member of the Duma's Committee on Budget, Taxes, Banks and Finance. In the late 1990s and early 2000s he served as First Deputy Head of the State Taxes Service, and as Deputy Finance Minister. In 2001 he was appointed to the Federation Council of the Federal Assembly. In 2003 he became vice-speaker and Deputy Chairman of the Federation Council.

Bushmin died after a long illness in 2019, having served as Deputy Chairman until his death. Tributes and condolences were offered by many of his political contemporaries. He had received a number of awards over his period of service, and was particularly proud of his Medal "For the Return of Crimea".

== Early life and career ==
Bushmin was born on 4 October 1958 in the village of Lopatino, Sergachsky District, then part of Gorky Oblast in the Russian Soviet Federative Socialist Republic, part of the Soviet Union. He studied as an engineer-economist at Lobachevsky State University of Gorky, graduating in 1980. He held a PhD in Economics, and his early work, since 1989, involved dealing with the practical issues of market relations. In 1990 Bushmin founded a company specializing in solving automation problems in medical care, and from 1990 to 1993 was the director of Kontur, a research and production company based in Nizhny Novgorod. In 1993 he was elected to the 1st State Duma, representing his home town constituency of Sergach, N122. From 1993 until 1995, he was deputy chairman of the deputy grouping "Liberal Democratic Union 12 December", before joining the deputy grouping "Stability" on 14 March 1995. While sitting in the Duma he served as a member of its Committee on Budget, Taxes, Banks and Finance.

== Politics and economics ==
From 1996 to 1998 Bushmin was First Deputy Head of the State Taxes Service, and from 1998 until 2001 he was Deputy Finance Minister. On 20 November 2001 he was appointed to represent Nizhny Novgorod Oblast in the Federation Council of the Federal Assembly. He continued as a representative in the Countil for the rest of his life, changing to represent Rostov Oblast on 21 September 2005. He served for a time as the chairman of the council's committee on the Budget and Financial Markets. Bushmin became vice-speaker and Deputy Chairman of the Federation Council in 2013, replacing Svetlana Orlova in this post. In 2014 Bushmin was one of the individuals placed under sanctions by the United States over the annexation of Crimea by the Russian Federation. Bushmin had been a key legislator in a March 2014 vote that granted the Russian president powers to occupy Crimea. Bushmin, who later described himself as an admirer of the United States, expressed his disappointment at the decision to sanction him. During his later career he was also co-chair of the Supervisory Board of the journal Parlamentskaya Gazeta.

== Awards ==
Bushmin had received several awards over his career. In 2005 he was awarded the Medal of the Order "For Merit to the Fatherland" Second Class. On 21 August 2018 he was awarded the Order of Alexander Nevsky "for merit in strengthening Russian statehood, the development of parliamentarism and many years of conscientious work". He had also been awarded the Stolypin Medal Second Class on 24 July 2017. He received the Order of Honour on 19 October 2013. He had also received the Medal "For the Return of Crimea", which he later recalled was one of the awards that he was most proud of, particularly as he cited it as a reason for his inclusion in US sanctions.

== Death ==
Bushmin died on 6 October, two days after his 61st birthday, after a long illness. Vladimir Dzhabarov, First Deputy Chairman of the Federation Council's Committee on International Affairs, paid tribute to Bushmin, calling him a "remarkable man, and a patriot of Russia". State Duma deputy Mikhail Yemelyanov stated that he was a "professional, decent and responsive person". Aleksandr Ishchenko, speaker of the Legislative Assembly of Rostov Oblast, recorded that Bushmin was "a remarkable man, comrade, friend for the region, he did a lot". Vasily Golubev, governor of Rostov Oblast, sent a telegram of condolence to Bushmin's friends and relatives. The Chairman of the State Duma Vyacheslav Volodin stated that Bushmin "made a great contribution to the development of Russian parliamentarism. As State Duma deputy, deputy finance minister, and member of the Federation Council he devoted a quarter of a century to legislative work".

After a memorial ceremony at the Central Clinical Hospital on 8 October, Bushmin was buried at Moscow's Troyekurovskoye Cemetery later that day. A minute's silence in memory of Bushmin was observed in the Federation Council on 9 October.
