= Vladimir Lakunin =

Russian politician (born 1962)

- Владимир Лакунин

Russian Federation Senator from Rostov Oblast
- In office 14 November 2019 – 21 September 2020
- Preceded by: Yevgeny Bushmin
- Succeeded by: Andrey Yatskin

Member of the Legislative Assembly of Rostov Oblast
- In office 2008 – 14 November 2019

Personal details
- Born: Vladimir Yuryevich Lakunin; 4 October 1962 (age 63) Gudermes, Russia, Soviet Union
- Party: United Russia

Vladimir Yuryevich Lakunin (Russian: Владимир Юрьевич Лакунин; born 4 October 1962), is a Russian politician and businessman who had served as the Member of the Federation Council as a representative from the executive authority of Rostov Oblast from 2019 to 2020.

== Biography ==
Vladimir Lakunin was born 4 October 1962 in Gudermes, in the Chechen-Ingush Autonomous Soviet Socialist Republic. He graduated from the Grozny Oil Institute in 1985, and the Russian Academy of National Economy under the Government of the Russia, as a candidate of Economic Sciences.

From 1985 to 1992, he worked at the Grozny Chemical Plant, as the last position he took was a shop manager. Then until 1994, he held the position of Deputy Chief Safety Engineer at the Nitron Saratov Production Association, and from 1994 to 1999, he was the deputy director for External Relations CHIMF "Rostov". The enterprise is located in the city of Kamensk-Shakhtinsky, Rostov Oblast, of which Lakunin is an honorary citizen there.

In 2002, he joined the United Russia party.

Since 2008, Lakunin had been a member of the Legislative Assembly of Rostov Oblast of the IV to VI convocations.

On 14 November 2019, the Governor of Rostov Oblast, Vasily Golubev, by his decree appointed Lakunin a member of the Federation Council - a representative of the executive body of state power in the region, replacing Yevgeny Bushmin, who died on 6 October.

On September 21, 2020, the re-elected governor Golubev appointed Andrey Yatskin, as a member of the Federation Council, and as the new senator from the executive branch of the region, replacing Lakunin.
