= Governor of Rostov Oblast =

Highest-ranking official in Rostov Oblast, Russia

- Губернатор Ростовской области
- Standard of the Governor

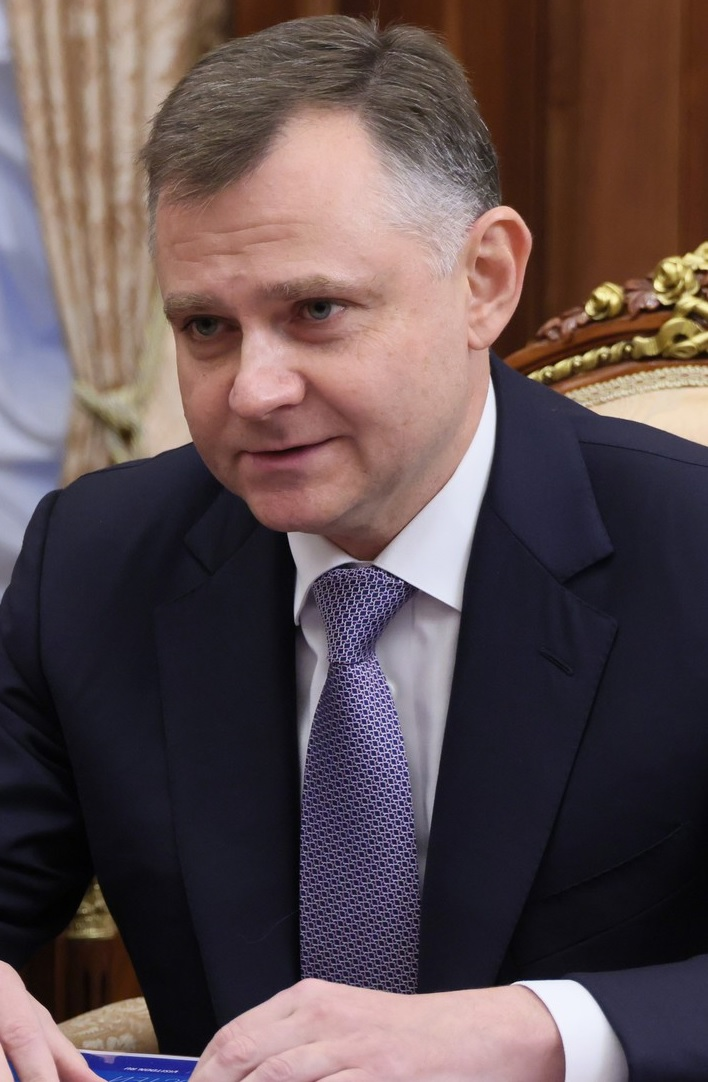
- Incumbent; Yury Slyusar since 19 September 2025
- Seat: House of Soviets, Rostov-on-Don
- Term length: 5 years
- Formation: 1991
- Website: www.donland.ru

The Governor of Rostov Oblast (Russian: Губернатор Ростовской области) is the head of government of Rostov Oblast, a federal subject of Russia.

The position was introduced in 1991 as Head of Administration of Rostov Oblast. The Governor is elected by direct popular vote for a term of five years.

== List of officeholders ==
#	Portrait	Governor	Tenure	Time in office	Party	Election
1		Vladimir Chub (born 1948)	8 October 1991 – 14 June 2010 (term end)	18 years, 249 days	Independent	Appointed 1996; 2001; 2005
1		Vladimir Chub (born 1948)	8 October 1991 – 14 June 2010 (term end)	18 years, 249 days	United Russia	Appointed 1996; 2001; 2005
2		Vasily Golubev (born 1957)	14 June 2010 – 8 June 2015 (term end)	14 years, 143 days	United Russia	2010
—		Vasily Golubev (born 1957)	8 June 2015 – 29 September 2015	14 years, 143 days	United Russia	Acting
(2)		Vasily Golubev (born 1957)	29 September 2015 – 4 November 2024 (resigned)	14 years, 143 days	United Russia	2015; 2020
—		Yury Slyusar (born 1974)	4 November 2024 – 19 September 2025	1 year, 307 days	United Russia	Acting
3		Yury Slyusar (born 1974)	19 September 2025 – present	1 year, 307 days	United Russia	2025
