= Sergey Anokhin (politician) =

- Сергей Анохин

Member of the Federation Council from the Executive Authority of Rostov Oblast
- In office 11 December 2001 – 21 September 2005
- Succeeded by: Yevgeny Bushmin

Personal details
- Born: Sergey Viktorovych Anokhin; 16 May 1964 (age 61) Soviet Union

Sergey Viktorovych Anokhin (Russian: Сергей Викторович Анохин; born on 16 May 1964), is a Russian politician who had served as a Member of the Federation Council from the Executive Authority of Rostov Oblast from 2001 to 2005.

== Biography ==
Sergey Anokhin was born on 16 May 1964.

He graduated from the Faculty of Philosophy of Moscow State University (Moscow State University) named after MV Lomonosov, graduate school of the Department of Philosophy of Moscow State University.

He worked at Moscow State University as a teacher of the Department of Scientific Communism. In 1988, he was at the liberated Komsomol work in the Komsomol Committee of the Moscow State University, oversaw ideological work. Since 1990, he was in the executive committee of the Moscow City Council of People's Deputies, was the organizer of the Youth Service.

In the elections of the Governor of the Rostov Region in September 2001, Anokhin was the coordinator of the election campaign and one of the authors of Governor Vladimir Chub. He also became a Member of the Federation Council from the Executive Authority of Rostov Oblast on 11 December.

He left office on 21 September 2005, being replaced by his successor, Yevgeny Bushmin.
