= Leonid Tyagachyov =

Russian sports functionary

- Леонид Тягачёв
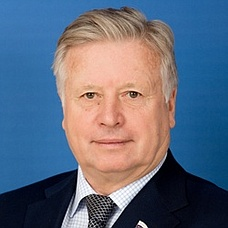
- Tyagachyov in 2013

Senator from Rostov Oblast
- In office 11 July 2007 – 15 September 2018
- Preceded by: Alexander Kazakov
- Succeeded by: Irina Rukavishnikova

President of the Russian Olympic Committee
- In office 18 July 2001 – 20 May 2010
- Preceded by: Vitali Smirnov
- Succeeded by: Alexander Zhukov

Chairman of the State Committee for Physical Culture and Sports
- In office 2 November 1996 – 24 June 1999
- Preceded by: Shamil Tarpishchev
- Succeeded by: Boris Ivanyuzhenkov (as minister)

Personal details
- Born: 10 October 1946 (age 79) Dedenevo, Moscow Oblast, RSFSR, Soviet Union
- Education: State University of Education

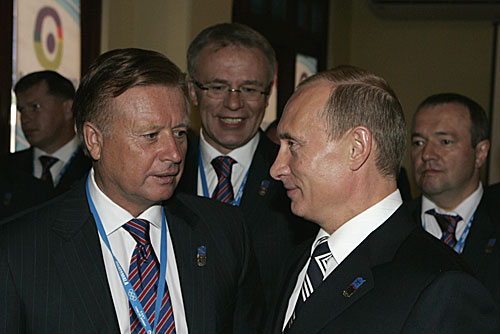
Leonid Tyagachyov, Vyacheslav Fetisov, Vladimir Putin

Leonid Vasilievich Tyagachyov (Russian: Леонид Васильевич Тягачёв; born 10 October 1946) is a Russian politician, sportsman and honorary president of the Russian Olympic Committee (ROC). Between 2001 and 2010, Tyagachyov served as President of the Russian Olympic Committee.

== Early life ==
Tyagachyov was a skier representing the Soviet Union and became champion of the USSR. During his time as a skier, he participated in several international competitions. Tyagachyov was champion of the USSR among teams of physical culture for football, and also a master of sports of the USSR in football.

== Awards ==
- Order For Merit to the Fatherland 3rd class
- Order For Merit to the Fatherland 4th class
- Order of Honour (1999)
- Order of Friendship of Peoples (1994)
- Medal In Commemoration of the 850th Anniversary of Moscow (1997)
- Silver Olympic Order (2006)
- Honored Worker of Physical Culture of the Russian Federation (2007)
