= List of deputy chairmen of the Federation Council of Russia =

The following is a list of deputy chairmen of the Federation Council of Russia.

== First deputy chairmen ==
# (Note: These are official numbers.)	Name	Period	Federal subject
1	Valery Goreglyad	30 January 2002–28 January 2004	Sakhalin Oblast
—	Abolished	29 January 2004–18 September 2009	—
2	Alexander Torshin	19 September 2009–3 March 2010; 3 March 2010–20 January 2015	Mari-El
3	Nikolay Fyodorov	30 September 2015–22 September 2020	Chuvash Republic
4	Andrey Yatskin	23 September 2020–Incumbent	Rostov Oblast
5	Andrey Turchak	23 September 2020–4 June 2024	Pskov Oblast
6	Vladimir Yakushev	25 September 2024–Incumbent	Tyumen Oblast

== Deputy chairmen ==
#	Name	Period	Federal subject
1	Ramazan Abdulatipov	14 January 1994–15 January 1996	Dagestan
2	Valeryan Viktorov	14 January 1994–23 January 1996	Chuvashia
3	Anatoly Dolgolaptev	25 October 1994–23 January 1996	Moscow Oblast
4	Vasily Likhachev	24 January 1996–10 June 1998	Tatarstan
5	Oleg Korolyov	24 January 1996–1 January 2002	Lipetsk Oblast
6	Valery Zubov	24 January 1996–10 June 1998	Krasnoyarsk Krai
7	Valery Kokov	24 January 1996–24 December 2001	Kabardino-Balkaria
8	Vladimir Platonov	10 June 1998–10 October 2001	Moscow Oblast
9	Vladimir Varnavsky	10 June 1998–26 December 2002	Omsk Oblast
10	Valery Goreglyad	26 December 2001–30 January 2002	Sakhalin Oblast
11	Andrey Vikharev	30 January 2002–28 May 2003	Kurgan Oblast
12	Mikhail Nikolayev	30 January 2002–23 June 2010	Sakha
13	Alexander Torshin	30 January 2002–19 September 2008	Mari-El
14	Dmitry Mezentsev	28 January 2004–7 July 2009	Irkutsk Oblast
15	Svetlana Orlova	28 January 2004–12 November 2008	Kemerovo Oblast
16	Yury Vorobyov	19 September 2008–Incumbent	Vologda Oblast
17	Vyacheslav Shtyrov	24 November 2010–27 September 2014	Sakha
18	Ilyas Umakhanov	25 December 2010–17 March 2021	Dagestan
19	Yevgeny Bushmin	27 April 2013–6 October 2019	Rostov Oblast
20	Galina Karelova	1 October 2014–25 September 2023	Voronezh Oblast
21	Andrey Turchak	8 November 2017–23 September 2020	Pskov Oblast
22	Nikolai Zhuravlev	6 November 2019–Incumbent	Kostroma Oblast
23	Konstantin Kosachev	17 March 2021–Incumbent	Mari El
24	Inna Svyatenko	25 September 2023–Incumbent	Moscow

== Bibliography ==
- Europa World Year Book 1995, 1997, 1999, 2002, 2003, 2004
