= Andrey Yatskin =

Russian politician (born 1969)

- Андрей Яцкин
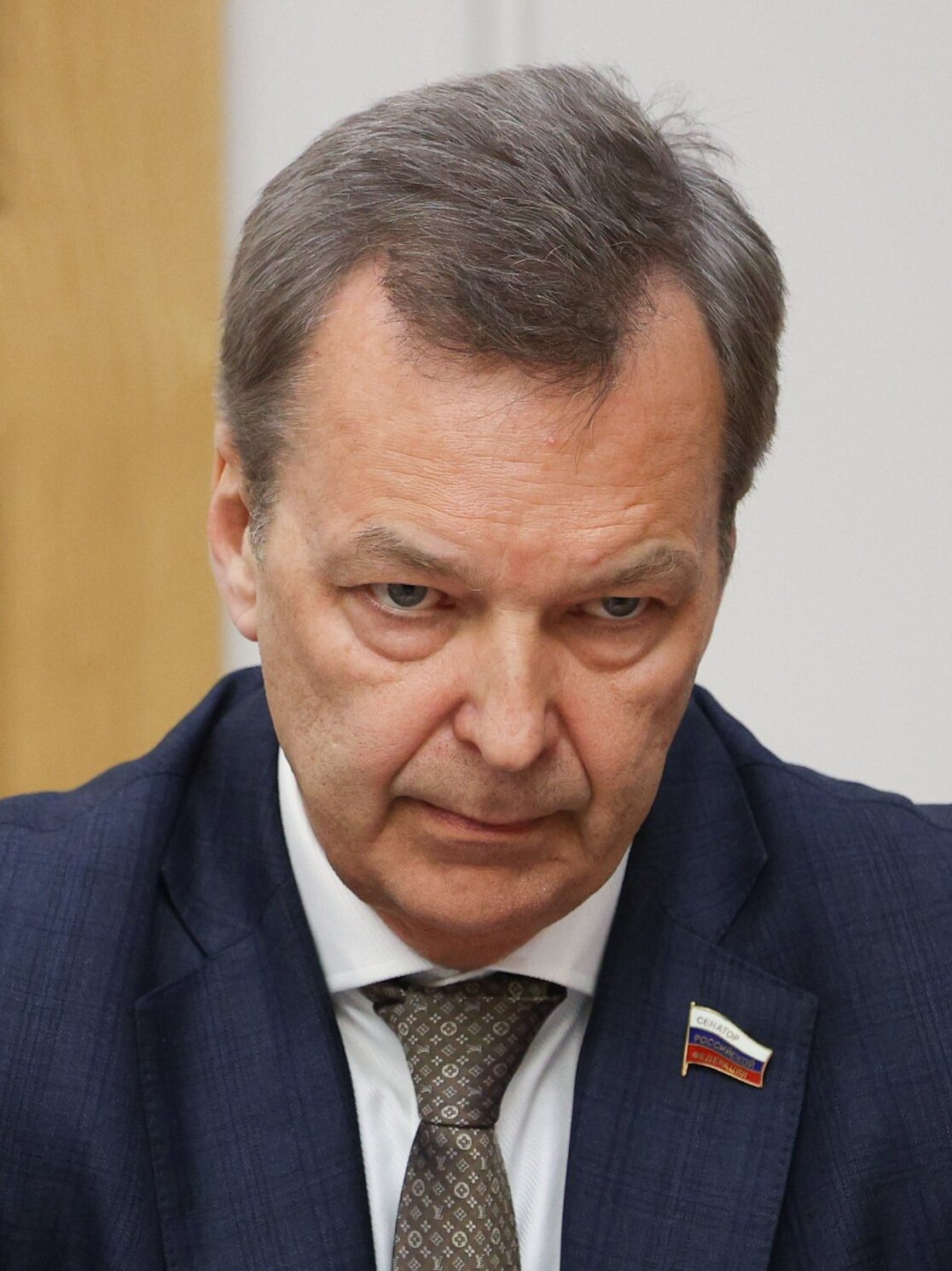
- Yatskin in 2024

First Deputy Chairman of the Federation Council
- Incumbent
- Assumed office 23 September 2020
- Preceded by: Nikolay Fyodorov

Russian Federation Senator from Rostov Oblast
- Incumbent
- Assumed office 21 September 2020
- Preceded by: Vladimir Lakunin

Personal details
- Born: Andrey Vladimirovich Yatskin; 25 April 1969 (age 57) Krasnoyarsk, Soviet Union
- Party: United Russia
- Education: Kurgan Higher Military-Political Aviation School
- Alma mater: Military University of the Ministry of Defense of Russia; Russian Academy of Public Administration; Institute of State and Law

Andrey Vladimirovich Yatskin (Russian: Андрей Владимирович Яцкин; born on 25 April 1969) is a Russian statesman and politician who is currently the First Deputy Chairman of the Federation Council since 23 September 2020, as well as the Senator of from the executive authority of Rostov Oblast since 21 September 2020.

He is an 1st class Active State Councillor of the Russian Federation, Candidate of Juridical Sciences, associate professor, and Honored Lawyer of Russia awarded in 2008.

== Biography ==
Andrey Yatskin was born on 25 April 1969 in Krasnoyarsk. He graduated from the Kurgan Higher Military-Political Aviation School in 1990 and continued his studies at the Faculty of Law of the Military University of the Ministry of Defense of Russia in Moscow with a degree in jurisprudence, which he graduated in 1996.

From 1996 to 1999, he worked in the Administrative Department of the Apparatus of the Government of Russia, followed by an appointment as an Assistant to the Russian Prime Minister, Sergei Stepashin. After Stepashin's resignation and Vladimir Putin's appointment as Prime Minister, Yatskin continued to work as Stepashin's assistant. In 2000, he graduated from the Russian Academy of Public Administration under the President of Russia, and between 2000–2003 worked as Chief of Staff of the Deputy Head of the Presidential Administration, Dmitry Kozak. When Kozak got appointed to the post of Head of the Administration of the President of the Russian Federation, Yatskin became First Deputy head of his staff. During a brief period in March–April 2004, he was the Deputy Chief of Staff of the Government of Russia.

From 28 April 2004 to 21 September 2020, he worked as the Plenipotentiary Representative of the Government of Russia in the Federation Council. As part of his work, among other responsibilities, he periodically presented government awards to members of the upper house of parliament. Since September 2005, he has been a member of the Government Commission for Improving Interaction Between Federal Executive Bodies and Executive Bodies of the Subjects of Russia. On 11 January 2009, he was awarded the class rank of Acting State Councilor of Russia, 2nd class, and on 14 May 2010, Acting State Councilor of the Russia, 1st class.

On 13 April 2020, by order of Prime Minister Mikhail Mishustin, Yatskin was also entrusted with the temporary duties of the Plenipotentiary Representative of the Government of the Russia in the State Duma. On 21 September 2020, by decree of the Governor of Rostov Oblast, Vasily Golubev, who was re-elected to his post on the Single Voting Day on 13 September 2020, Yatskin became the Senator of Rostov Oblast, representing the executive authority of the region, replacing Vladimir Lakunin. On 23 September 2020, Yatskin was appointed the First Deputy Chairman of the Federation Council. His candidacy for this post was proposed by the Chairman of the Federation Council, Valentina Matviyenko. On the same day, Andrey Turchak, who previously held the position of Deputy Chairman of the Federation Council, was elected to a similar post as First Deputy Chairman of the Federation Council.

== Teaching and scientific activity ==
In 2007, he defended his dissertation on the topic "Legal regulation of administrative reform in modern Russia" at the Institute of State and Law of the Russian Academy of Sciences becoming a candidate of legal sciences. Since 2007, he has been teaching at the National Research University Higher School of Economics as an associate professor at the Department of Business Law of the Faculty of Law.

== Awards ==
- Order "For Merit to the Fatherland"
- Order of Honour
- Stolypin Medal
- Honoured Lawyer of Russia
- Governmental Certificagte of Honour
- Governmental Gratitude
- Presidential Letter of Gratitude

== Sanctions ==
He was sanctioned by the UK government on 15 March 2022 in relation to the Russo-Ukrainian War.
