= Yury Slyusar =

Russian businessman

- Юрий Слюсарь
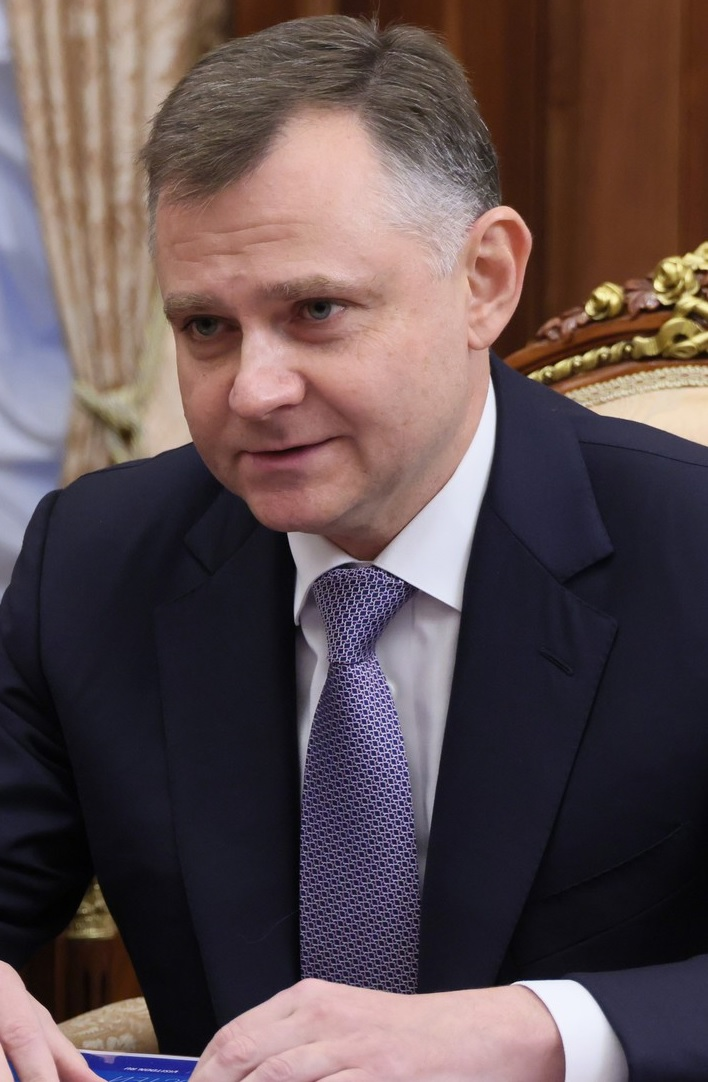
- Slyusar in 2025

Governor of Rostov Oblast
- Incumbent
- Assumed office 19 September 2025 (Note: Acting: 4 November 2024 – 19 September 2025)
- Preceded by: Vasily Golubev

Personal details
- Born: 20 July 1974 (age 51) Rostov-on-Don, Rostov Oblast, RSFSR, Soviet Union
- Children: 2

Yury Borisovich Slyusar (Russian: Юрий Борисович Слюсарь; born 20 July 1974) is a Russian politician serving as the governor of Rostov Oblast since September 2025 and the former CEO of the Russian conglomerate United Aircraft Corporation (UAC).

== Biography ==
Slyusar was born on 20 July 1974 in Rostov-on-Don. His father worked as the CEO of Russian state-owned helicopter manufacturing company Rostvertol.

Slyusar graduated from M.V. Lomonosov Moscow State University in 1996. In 2003 he graduated from the postgraduate school at Russian Presidential Academy of National Economy and Public Administration. In 2007 he defended his Candidate of Economic Sciences dissertation "Cybernetic approach to organization of management in corporative systems".

In 1996–1999 Slyusar was the COO of multi-profile "Firm UBS". In the late 1990s he started film producing and audio-recording business. In 1999–2009 he headed audio-recording and film producing studio Monolith. One of the singers who worked with Slyusar was Glukoza. In 2006 and 2007 he was the chairman of the musical competition 5 Stars

In 2003–2007 he worked as the commercial director of Rosvertol. Since 2005 he has been the head of the committee for helicopter programs at Russian aerospace holding company Oboronprom.

In 2009 Slyusar was named assistant to the Minister of Industry and Trade in the Government of the Russian Federation Viktor Khristenko.

In 2010 Slyusar was appointed director of the Aviation-Industry Department in the ministry.

In January 2012 Slyusar was appointed Deputy Minister of Industry and Trade.

Slyusar was Deputy Industry and Trade Minister prior to 13 January 2015. He had duties related to the Government Commission on Biological and Chemical Security while he was in government.

On 13 January 2015 Slyusar was appointed CEO of UAC. Previously, the CEO duties and those of the General Designer of UAC were held jointly by Mikhail Pogosyan.

On 15 July 2021 Slyusar had a meeting with Russian president Vladimir Putin to discuss the corporation's current activity and major projects.

Until December 2021 Slyusar was a member of the Supreme Council of United Russia Political Party.

He was appointed by president Vladimir Putin as the acting governor of Rostov Oblast on 4 November 2024, after the previous governor Vasily Golubev resigned from the position.

== Family ==
He is married and has two children. Wife - Slyusar Olga Leonidovna. Among Olga Leonidovna assets include the Rostov-on-Don construction company "StroyVertol", established in 2008.

== Sanctions ==
On 24 February 2022 Slyusar and UAC were sanctioned by the British government, as they were judged to have aided in the Russian invasion of Ukraine.

In May 2022 the United States Department of the Treasury placed sanctions on Slyusar pursuant to Executive Order 14024 as a member of the Government of Russia.
