= Irina Rukavishnikova =

Russian politician (born 1973)

- Ирина Рукавишникова
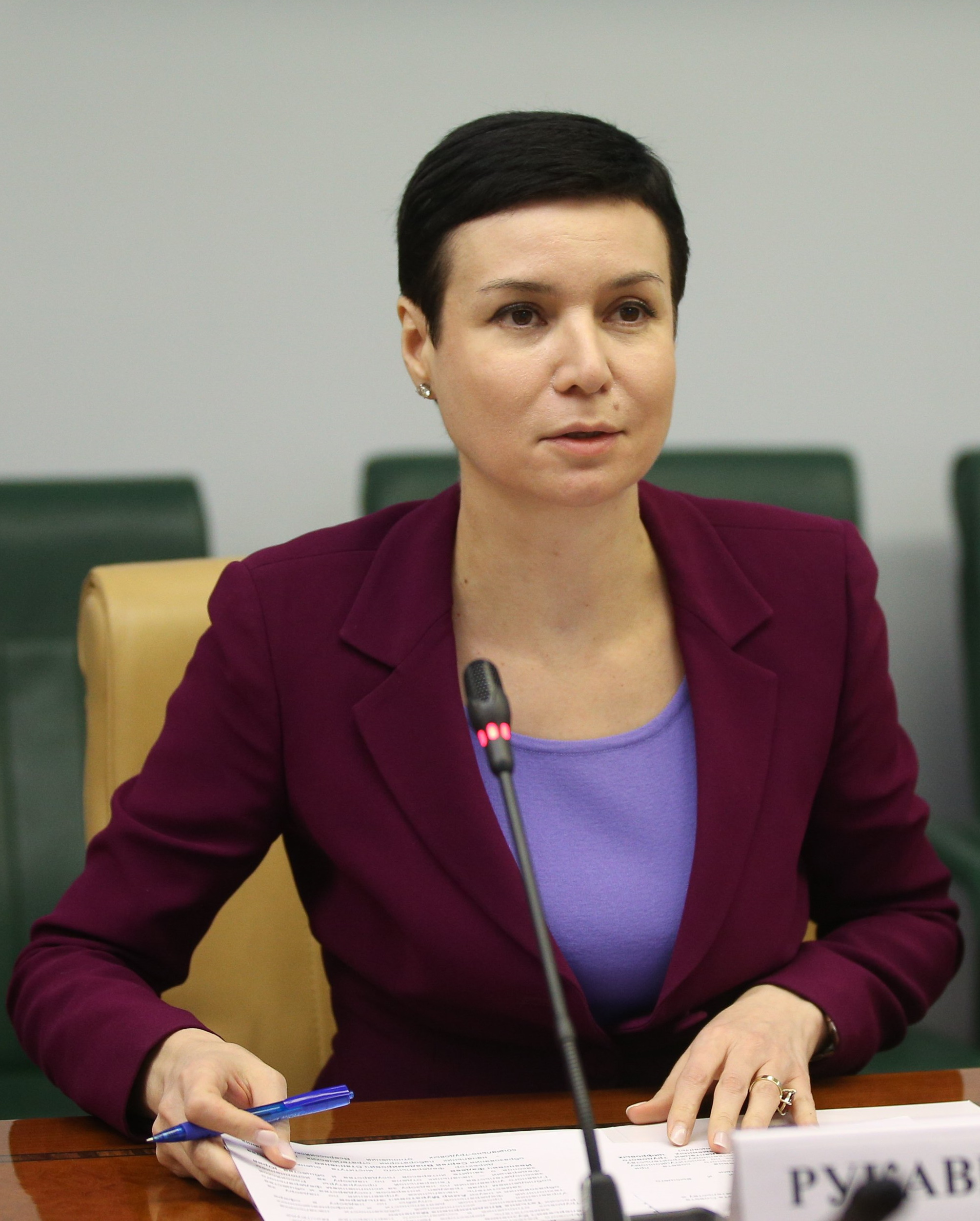

Senator from Rostov Oblast
- Incumbent
- Assumed office 15 September 2018
- Preceded by: Leonid Tyagachyov

Personal details
- Born: 3 February 1973 (age 53) Rostov-on-Don, Russian SFSR, Soviet Union
- Party: United Russia
- Education: Rostov State University

Irina Valeryevna Rukavishnikova (Russian: Ирина Валерьевна Рукавишникова; born 3 February 1973) is a Russian politician serving as a senator from Rostov Oblast since 15 September 2018.

== Biography ==
Irina Rukavishnikova was born on 3 February 1973 in Rostov-on-Don. In 1995, she graduated from Rostov State University. Three years later, Rukavishnikova also defended a doctoral degree at Rostov State University. From 1995 to 1997, she worked as an instructor at the Rostov State University of Economics. From 1997 to 2005, she was the Deputy Dean of the Faculty of Law of the Rostov State Economic University. In 2006 she was appointed Dean of the Faculty of Law of the Rostov State Economic University. From 2013 to 2018, Rukavishnikova was the deputy of the Legislative Assembly of Rostov Oblast of the 5th and 6th convocations. On 15 September 2018, she became a senator after deputies from the Legislative Assembly of Rostov Oblast nominated her.

=== Sanctions ===
Rukavishnikova was sanctioned by the European Union, the United Kingdom, the United States, and other states, for supporting Russia's annexation of Ukrainian territories.
