= Evgeny Bessonov =

Russian politician (born 1968)

Evgeny Bessonov MP
- Евгений Бессонов
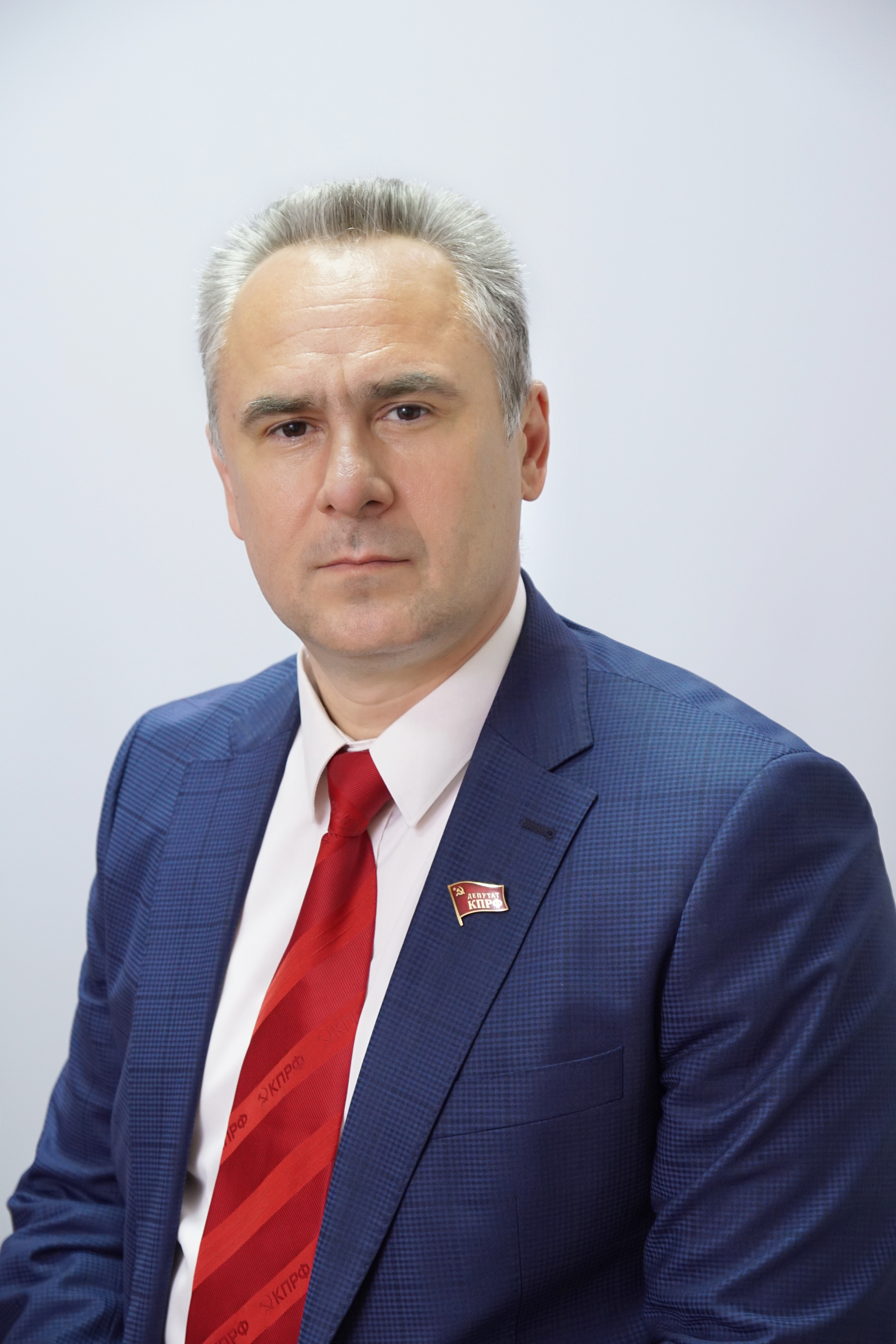

Member of the State Duma (Party List Seat)
- Incumbent
- Assumed office 12 October 2021

Personal details
- Born: 26 November 1968 (age 57) Rostov-on-Don, RSFSR, USSR
- Party: Communist Party of the Russian Federation
- Education: Rostov Military Institute of Missile Troops; Rostov State University

Evgeny Ivanovich Bessonov (Russian: Евгений Иванович Бессонов; born 26 November 1968, Rostov-on-Don) is a Russian political figure and a deputy of the 8th State Duma.

He served in the military as a platoon commander in the ranks of the Soviet Armed Forces. From 1999 to 2003, he was the assistant to Nikolai Kolomeitsev, who was the deputy of the State Duma. From 2006 to 2013, he was the legal adviser of the Management of mechanization and construction LLC. From 2008 to 2021, he was the deputy of the Legislative Assembly of the Rostov Oblast of the 4th, 5th, 6th convocations. Since September 2021, he has served as deputy of the 8th State Duma.

== Sanctions ==
He was sanctioned by the UK government in 2022 in relation to the Russo-Ukrainian War.
