= Vladimir Chub =

Russian politician (born 1948)

- Владимир Чуб
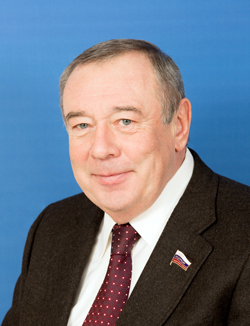
- Chub in 2013

Member of the Federation Council
- In office 24 December 2011 – 6 October 2016
- Preceded by: Vyacheslav Popov
- Succeeded by: Tatyana Kusayko

1st Governor of Rostov Oblast
- In office 8 October 1991 – 14 June 2010
- Succeeded by: Vasily Golubev

Personal details
- Born: 24 June 1948 (age 78) Pinsk, Brest Oblast, BSSR, Soviet Union
- Party: United Russia
- Children: 2

Vladimir Fyodorovich Chub (Russian: Владимир Фёдорович Чуб; born 24 July 1948) is a Russian politician who served as Governor of Rostov Oblast from 1991 until 2010. He was appointed governor in October 1991 and later that year won an election for the post by a large majority. He was re-elected in 1996 and 2001. He was appointed to the Federation Council in 1993. Prior to his governorship, he was First Secretary of the CPSU committee of Proletarian district of Rostov. He is a member of the United Russia party, formerly a member of NDR, and OKS. His administration takes a strong stance against illegal political activity. Chub is of Ukrainian ancestry.

== Honours and awards ==
- Order of Merit for the Fatherland;
  - 2nd class (24 July 2003) - for outstanding contribution to strengthening Russian statehood and many years of diligent work
  - 3rd class (1 July 1998) - for services to the state and the great personal contribution to the socio-economic transformation
  - 4th class (17 July 2008) - for outstanding contribution to the socio-economic development of the field and many years of honest work
- Order of Honour (7 May 1996) - for services to the state and many years of conscientious work
- Order of Friendship (13 May 2010) - for outstanding contribution to the socio-economic development of the field and many years of honest work
- Order of Honour and Glory, 2nd class (Abkhazia, 2003)
- Order of Akhmad Kadyrov (Chechen Republic)
- Diploma of the Government of the Russian Federation (24 July 2008) - for his great personal contribution to the socio-economic development of the Rostov region and years of diligent work
- Memorial sign "For service in the Caucasus" (a sign of military distinction, established in the Southern Federal District, 2003)
- Breastplate of the "200 Years of Ministry of Internal Affairs of Russia" (Russian Ministry of Internal Affairs, 2003)
- Commemorative Medal "100th Anniversary of birth of the great Russian writer and Nobel Prize winner Mikhail Sholokhov" (Ministry of Culture and Mass Communications of Russian Federation, June 9, 2005) - for active participation in the preparation and holding a series of activities commemorating the 100th anniversary of Mikhail Sholokhov

== Family ==
He is married to Zoya Akimovna Chub, who is engaged in entrepreneurial activities. He has a daughter, Tatyana, and a grandson, Vladimir.

== Awards ==
- Order "For Merit to the Fatherland," 2nd class (July 24, 2003) — for major contribution to strengthening Russian statehood and many years of conscientious work
- Order "For Merit to the Fatherland," 3rd class (July 1, 1998) — for services to the state and significant personal contribution to socio-economic reforms in the region
- Order "For Merit to the Fatherland," 4th class (July 17, 2008) — for major contribution to the socio-economic development of the region and many years of conscientious work
- Order of Honour (May 7, 1996) — for services to the state and many years of conscientious labor
- Order of Friendship (May 13, 2010) — for major contribution to the socio-economic development of the region and many years of conscientious work
- Order of Friendship (Uzbekistan, 2015)
- Order of Honour and Glory, 2nd class (Abkhazia, 2003)
- Certificate of Honour of the President of the Russian Federation (December 12, 2008) — for active participation in drafting the Constitution of the Russian Federation and significant contribution to the development of democratic foundations of the Russian Federation
- Gratitude of the President of the Russian Federation (August 12, 1996) — for active participation in organizing and conducting the 1996 presidential election campaign
- Certificate of Honour of the Cabinet of Ministers of Ukraine (July 24, 2003) — for personal contribution to strengthening bilateral relations between Ukraine and the Russian Federation, establishing effective interregional economic relations, and on the occasion of the 55th birthday
- Commemorative Badge "For Service in the Caucasus" (a military distinction established in the Southern Federal District, 2003)
- Breast Badge "200 Years of the Ministry of Internal Affairs of Russia" (Ministry of Internal Affairs of Russia, 2003)
- Commemorative Medal "100th Anniversary of the Birth of the Great Russian Writer, Nobel Laureate M. A. Sholokhov" (Ministry of Culture and Mass Communications of the Russian Federation, June 9, 2005) — for active participation in organizing and holding events dedicated to the 100th anniversary of the birth of Mikhail Sholokhov
- Honorary Citizen of Rostov Oblast (June 23, 2016)
