= Legislative Assembly of Rostov Oblast =

Regional parliament of Rostov Oblast, Russia

Legislative Assembly of Rostov Oblast Законодательное собрание Ростовской области
- 6th legislature

Type
- Type: Unicameral

Leadership
- Chairman: Aleksandr Ishchenko, United Russia since 6 October 2016

Structure
- Seats: 60
- Political groups: United Russia (54) CPRF (2); LDPR (2); SRZP (1) Independent (1)

Elections
- Voting system: Mixed
- Last election: 8–10 September 2023
- Next election: 2028

Meeting place
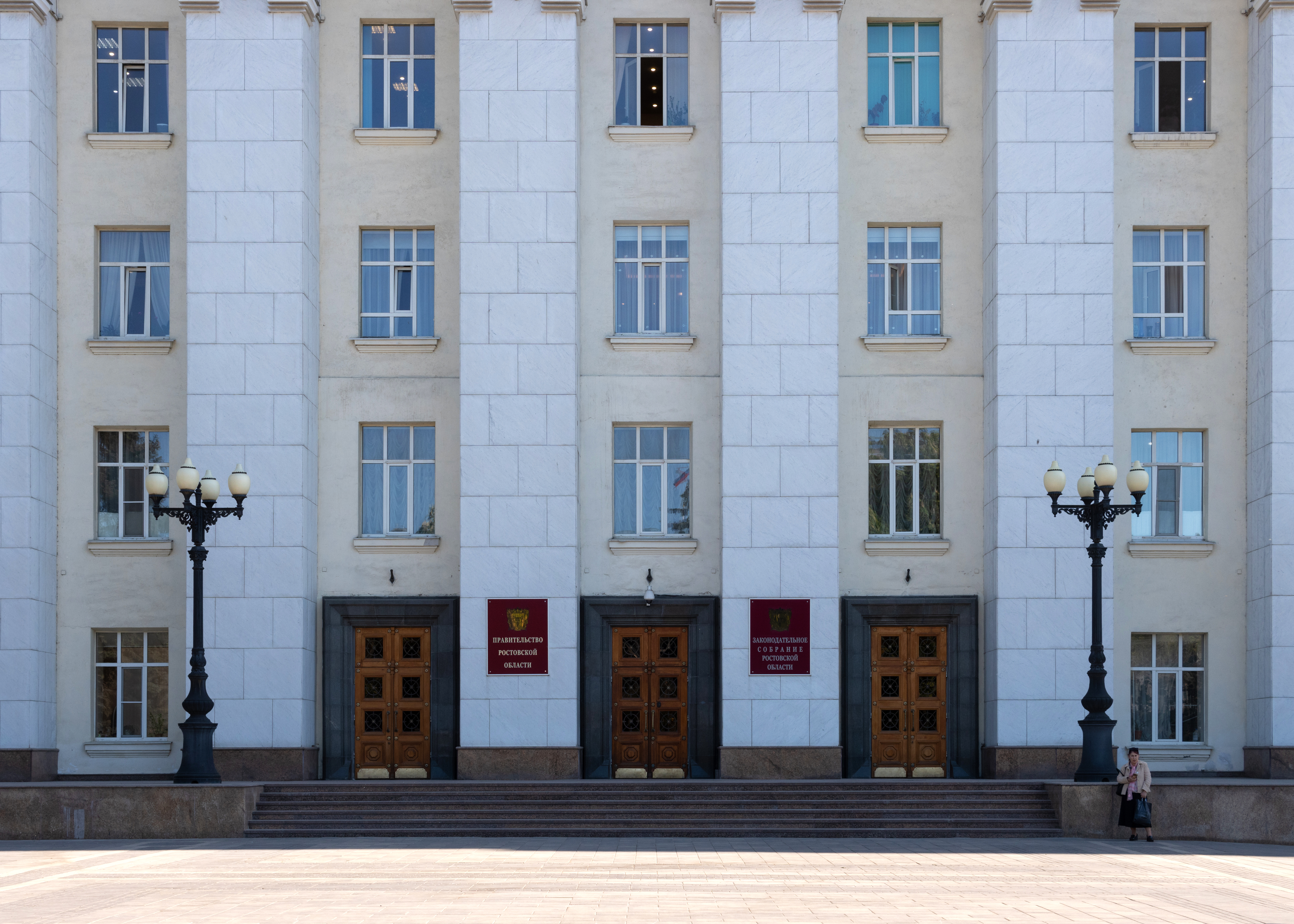

Website
- zsro.ru

The Legislative Assembly of Rostov Oblast (Russian: Законодательное собрание Ростовской области, romanized: Zakonodatel'noye sobraniye Rostovskoy oblasti) is the regional parliament of Rostov Oblast, a federal subject of Russia. A total of 60 deputies are elected for five-year terms.

== Elections ==
=== 2018 ===
Party	%	Seats
United Russia	56.98	46
Communist Party of the Russian Federation	17.13	8
Liberal Democratic Party of Russia	9.87	2
A Just Russia	7.06	2
Communists of Russia	5.06	1
Party of Growth	—	1
Party of Pensioners of Russia	1.13	0
People's Alliance	0.72	0
Registered voters/turnout	45.43	

=== 2023 ===
Party	%	Seats
United Russia	68.28	54
Communist Party of the Russian Federation	11.47	2
Liberal Democratic Party of Russia	6.92	2
A Just Russia - For Truth	4.81	1
Independent	-	1
New People	3.79	0
Communists of Russia	3.27	0
Registered voters/turnout	42.78	
