= Vasily Golubev (politician) =

Russian politician (born 1957)

- Василий Голубев
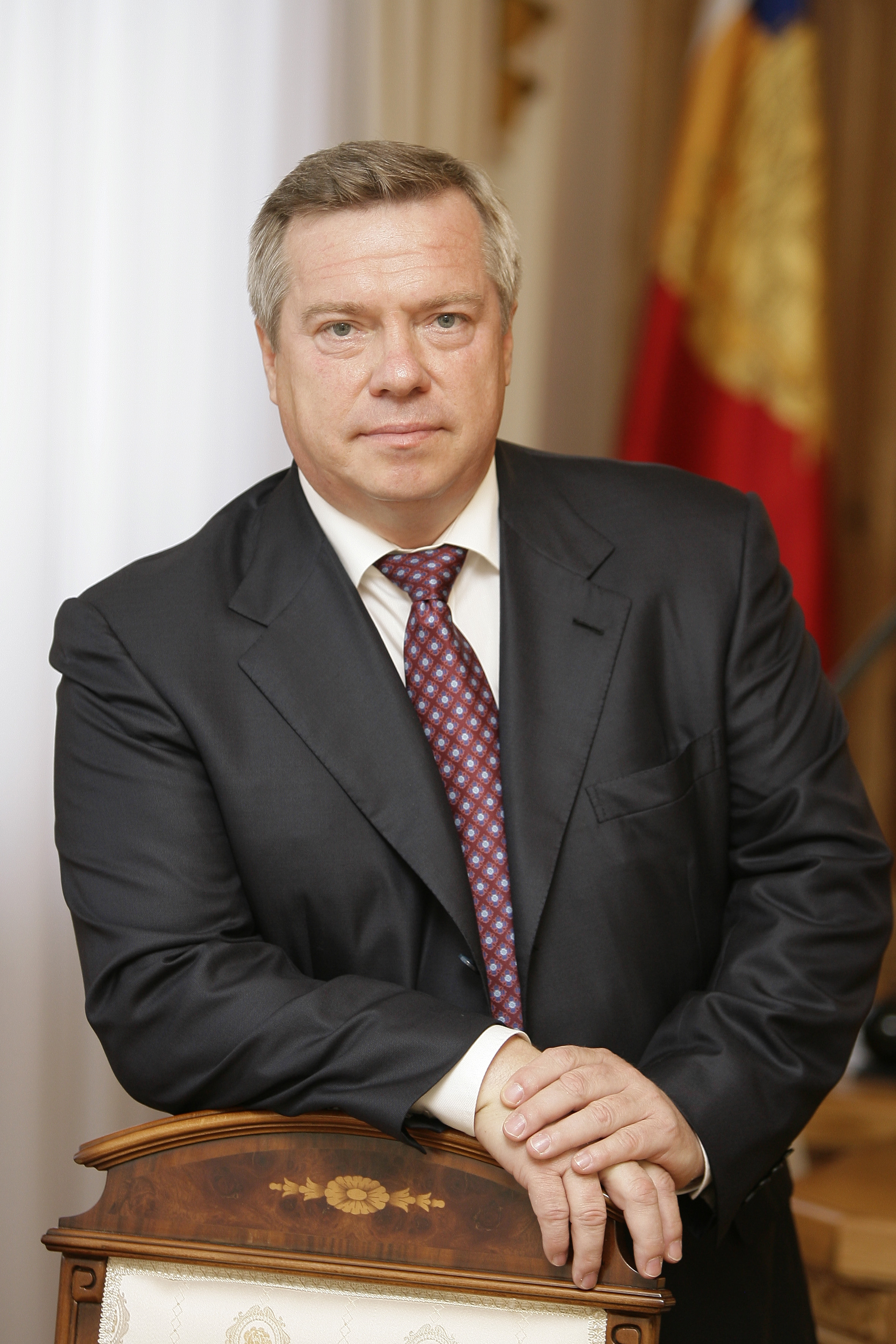
- Official portrait, 2010

2nd Governor of Rostov Oblast
- In office 14 June 2010 – 4 November 2024
- Preceded by: Vladimir Chub
- Succeeded by: Yury Slyusar

Acting Governor of Moscow Oblast
- In office 19 November 1999 – 2 February 2000
- Preceded by: Anatoly Tyazhlov
- Succeeded by: Boris Gromov

Personal details
- Born: Vasily Yuryevich Golubev; 30 January 1957 (age 69) Yermakovskaya, Tatsinsky District, Rostov Oblast, RSFSR, USSR
- Party: United Russia
- Other political affiliations: Communist Party (formerly)
- Spouse: Olga Golubeva
- Children: 2

Vasily Yuryevich Golubev (Russian: Василий Юрьевич Голубев; born 30 January 1957) is a Russian politician who has served as Governor of Rostov Oblast from 2010 to 2024.

== Career and life ==
He was a member of Communist Party of USSR. He became a politician in Moscow and Moscow Oblast where he was an acting governor for several weeks. He moved to Rostov after Vladimir Chub left his post of Oblast head and was connected to United Russia. His wife is a rich businesswoman.

He resigned from the post of governor of Rostov Oblast on 4 November 2024. He was replaced by Yury Slyusar as the new interim governor.

=== Family ===
Since 1979, he has been married to Olga Ivanovna Golubeva, née Kopylova. His wife is an engineer-economist by education and is the founder of a number of commercial entities with business interests in Moscow and Moscow Oblast. In a 2019 ranking of the wealthiest spouses of governors compiled by Kommersant, Olga Golubeva ranked third.

The couple have two biological children: Svetlana, born in 1980, the general director and owner of LLC “Investments and Technologies” — a pharmacy chain in the Leninsky District of Moscow Oblast — LLC “Farmateka,” and other companies; and a son, Alexei, born in 1982, an entrepreneur who worked at OJSC TNK-BP Holding. The family also raised Maxim, born in 1986, the son of Vasily Golubev’s younger brother, whose father died in a mining accident.

=== Sanctions ===
He was sanctioned by the UK government in 2022 in relation to the Russo-Ukrainian War.
