= 2025 Kaluga Oblast gubernatorial election =

← 2020	12–14 September 2025	2030 →
- Turnout: 44.76% ▲10.57 pp
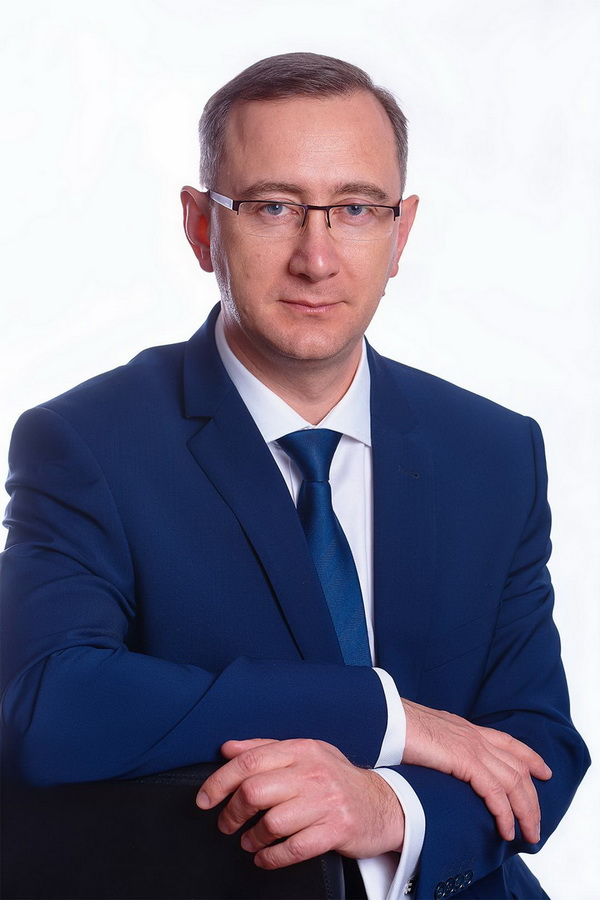
		SR–ZP	CPRF
Candidate	Vladislav Shapsha	Nadezhda Yefremova	Nikolay Yashkin
Party	United Russia	SR–ZP	CPRF
Popular vote	252,179	31,305	22,776
Percentage	72.24%	8.97%	6.52%
Governor before election
Vladislav Shapsha
United Russia
Governor-elect
Vladislav Shapsha
United Russia

The 2025 Kaluga Oblast gubernatorial election took place on 12–14 September 2025, on common election day, coinciding with 2025 Kaluga Oblast legislative election. Incumbent governor of Kaluga Oblast Vladislav Shapsha was re-elected to a second term in office.

== Background ==
Mayor of Obninsk Vladislav Shapsha was appointed acting governor of Kaluga Oblast in February 2020, replacing four-term incumbent Anatoly Artamonov, one of the longest-serving governors in Russia, who resigned at his own request. A day later Shapsha appointed Artamonov to the Federation Council after the resignation of senator Yury Volkov. Shapsha ran for a full term and overwhelmingly won the election with 71.19% of the vote.

In February 2025 during a meeting with President Vladimir Putin Governor Shapsha announced his intention to run for a second term and received Putin's endorsement.

== Candidates ==
In Kaluga Oblast candidates for Governor of Kaluga Oblast can be nominated only by registered political parties. Candidate for Governor of Kaluga Oblast should be a Russian citizen and at least 30 years old. Candidates for Governor of Kaluga Oblast should not have a foreign citizenship or residence permit. Each candidate in order to be registered is required to collect at least 5% of signatures of members and heads of municipalities. Also gubernatorial candidates present 3 candidacies to the Federation Council and election winner later appoints one of the presented candidates.

=== Declared ===
Candidate name, political party		Occupation	Status	Ref.
Stepan Oparyshev; Liberal Democratic Party		Construction executive 2020 gubernatorial candidate	Registered	
Ivan Rodin; Party of Pensioners		Member of Kaluga City Duma (2020–present); Former professional football player	Registered	
Vladislav Shapsha; United Russia	Vladislav Shapsha	Incumbent Governor of Kaluga Oblast (2020–present)	Registered	
Nikolay Yashkin; Communist Party		Member of Legislative Assembly of Kaluga Oblast (1996–present); Agribusinessman; 2015 and 2020 gubernatorial candidate	Registered	
Nadezhda Yefremova; SR–ZP		Member of Legislative Assembly of Kaluga Oblast (2020–present); 2020 gubernatorial candidate	Registered	

=== Candidates for Federation Council ===
Head candidate, political party	Candidates for Federation Council	Status
Stepan Oparyshev; LDPR	* Ilya Astafyev, individual entrepreneur * Taras Baranchuk, businessman * Vladimir Nosov, former Deputy Prosecutor of Kaluga Oblast (2007–2018), construction executive	Registered
Ivan Rodin; Party of Pensioners	* Sergey Gerasimov, businessman * Kirill Grishin, surveying executive * Natalya Terekhova, Member of Legislative Assembly of Kaluga Oblast (2020–present), businesswoman	Registered
Vladislav Shapsha; United Russia	* Anatoly Artamonov, incumbent Senator (2020–present), Chairman of the Council Committee on Budget and Financial Markets (2020–present) * Konstantin Gorobtsov, Deputy Governor of Kaluga Oblast (2018–present) * Oleg Komissar, Member of Legislative Assembly of Kaluga Oblast (2015–present), Rostec chemical executive	Registered
Nikolay Yashkin; Communist Party	* Artur Agvanyan, Member of Legislative Assembly of Kaluga Oblast (2020–present) * Anton Arkhipov, party instructor * Tatyana Lomakova, former Member of Kaluga City Duma (2015–2020)	Registered
Nadezhda Yefremova; SR–ZP	* Irina Bergovskaya, former Member of Civic Chamber of Kaluga Oblast (2022–2025) * Aleksey Gunko, military pensioner * Marina Momotyuk, cosmetology clinic chief doctor	Registered

== Finances ==
All sums are in rubles.

Financial Report	Source	Oparyshev	Rodin	Shapsha	Yashkin	Yefremova
First		25,000	25,000	7,525,000	25,000	25,000
Final		575,000	26,700	13,364,766	1,119,872	25,000

== Polls ==
Fieldwork date	Polling firm	Shapsha	Yefremova	Yashkin	Oparyshev	Rodin	None	Lead
14 September 2025	2025 election	72.2	9.0	6.5	4.8	4.4	3.1	63.2
March – August 2025	INSOMAR	78	4	8	5	2	3	70

== Results ==
Summary of the 12–14 September 2025 Kaluga Oblast gubernatorial election results
Candidate	Party	Votes	%
Vladislav Shapsha (incumbent)	United Russia	252,179	72.24
Nadezhda Yefremova	A Just Russia – For Truth	31,305	8.97
Nikolay Yashkin	Communist Party	22,776	6.52
Stepan Oparyshev	Liberal Democratic Party	16,599	4.76
Ivan Rodin	Party of Pensioners	15,265	4.37
Valid votes		338,124	96.86
Blank ballots		10,947	3.14
Total		349,071	100.00
Turnout		349,071	44.76
Registered voters		779,899	100.00

Governor Shapsha re-appointed incumbent Senator Anatoly Artamonov (United Russia) to the Federation Council.

== See also ==
- 2025 Russian regional elections
