= 2025 Kaluga Oblast legislative election =

Regional legislative election in Russia

- 12–14 September 2025

All 40 seats in the Legislative Assembly 21 seats needed for a majority
- Turnout: 44.41% ▲9.05 pp
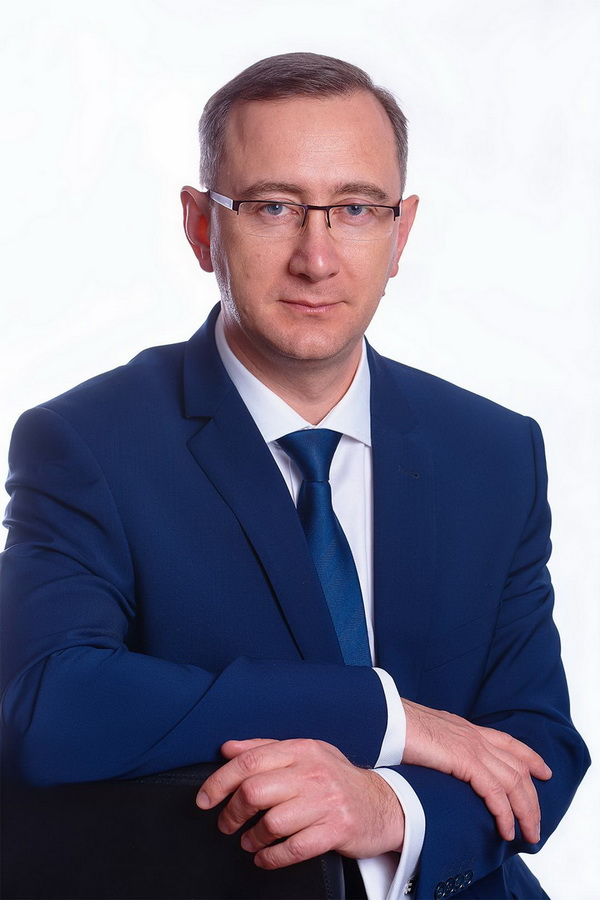

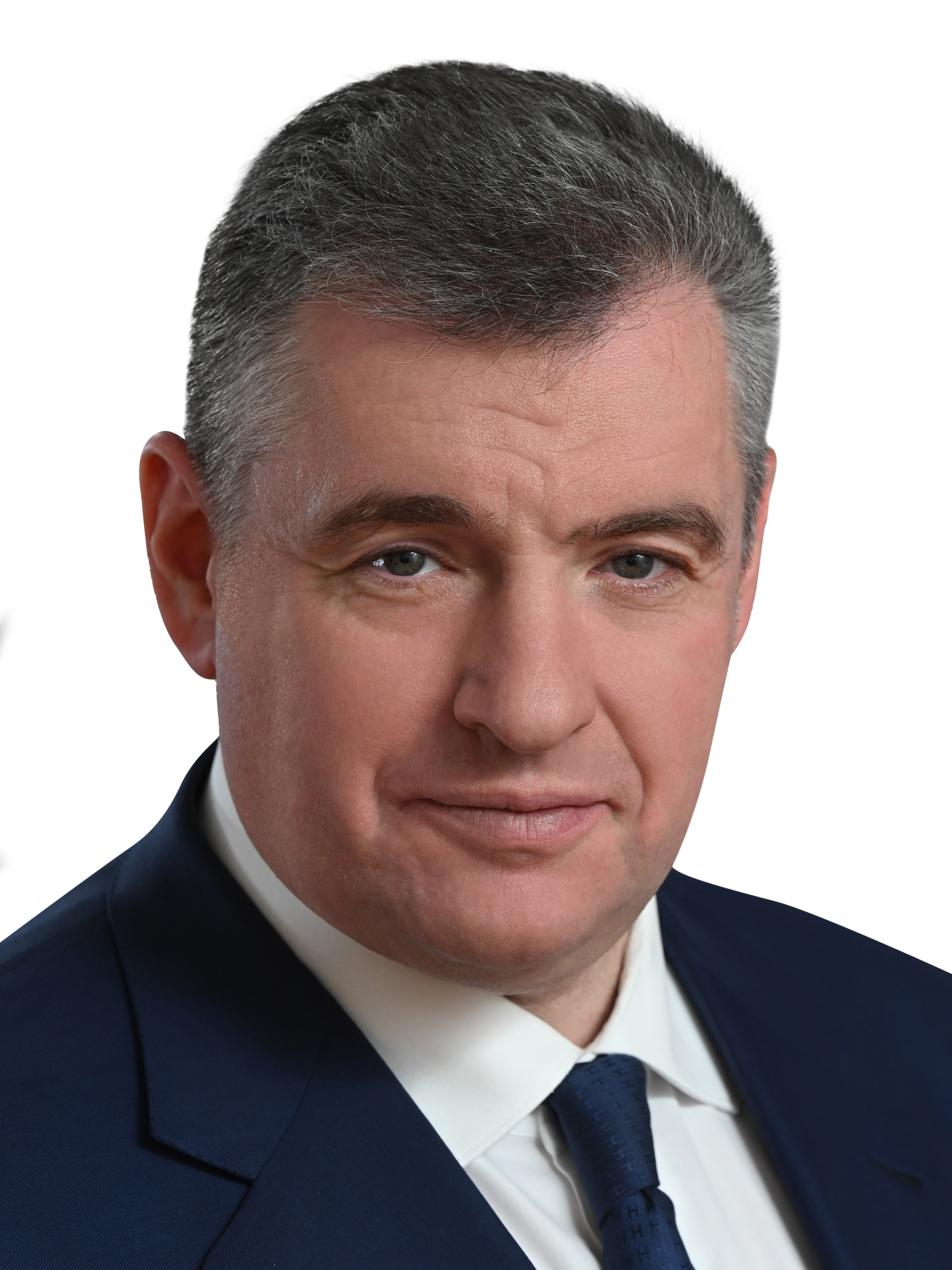
	Majority party	Minority party	Third party
			CPRF
Candidate	Vladislav Shapsha	Leonid Slutsky	Nikolay Yashkin
Party	United Russia	LDPR	CPRF
Last election	42.43%, 29 seats	8.60%, 2 seats	12.90%, 3 seats
Seats won	33	2	2
Seat change	▲4	Steady	▼1
Popular vote	203,804	33,158	32,979
Percentage	58.56%	9.53%	9.48%
Swing	▲16.13 pp	▲0.93 pp	▼3.42 pp
	Fourth party	Fifth party	Sixth party
	SR–ZP	RPPSS	NL
Candidate	Nadezhda Yefremova	Natalya Terekhova	Anastasia Burlyay
Party	SR–ZP	Party of Pensioners	New People
Last election	8.01%, 3 seats	7.84%, 1 seat	8.08%, 2 seats
Seats won	1	1	1
Seat change	▼2	Steady	▼1
Popular vote	27,407	19,862	19,003
Percentage	7.88%	5.71%	5.46%
Swing	▼0.13 pp	▼2.13 pp	▼2.62 pp
Chairman before election
Gennady Novoseltsev
United Russia
Elected Chairman
Gennady Novoseltsev
United Russia

The 2025 Legislative Assembly of Kaluga Oblast election took place on 12–14 September 2025, on common election day, coinciding with 2025 Kaluga Oblast gubernatorial election. All 40 seats in the Legislative Assembly were up for re-election.

United Russia increased its already overwhelming majority in the Legislative Assembly, winning 58.6% of the vote and all 20 single-mandate constituencies. Communist Party of the Russian Federation and New People lost one seat each, while A Just Russia – For Truth received almost similar result but lost two seats.

== Electoral system ==
Under current election laws, the Legislative Assembly is elected for a term of five years, with parallel voting. 20 seats are elected by party-list proportional representation with a 5% electoral threshold, with the other half elected in 20 single-member constituencies by first-past-the-post voting. Seats in the proportional part are allocated using the Imperiali quota, modified to ensure that every party list, which passes the threshold, receives at least one mandate.

== Candidates ==
=== Party lists ===
To register regional lists of candidates, parties need to collect 0.5% of signatures of all registered voters in Kaluga Oblast.

The following parties were relieved from the necessity to collect signatures:

- United Russia
- Communist Party of the Russian Federation
- Liberal Democratic Party of Russia
- A Just Russia — Patriots — For Truth
- New People
- Russian Party of Pensioners for Social Justice

№	Party	Oblast-wide list	Candidates	Territorial groups	Status
	Party of Pensioners	Natalya Terekhova • Kirill Grishin • Ivan Rodin • Yelena Terekhova	54	16	Registered
	Liberal Democratic Party	Leonid Slutsky • Vadim Dengin • Vladimir Nosov • Stepan Oparyshev	52	17	Registered
	A Just Russia – For Truth	Nadezhda Yefremova • Andrey Smolovik	75	19	Registered
	Communist Party	Nikolay Yashkin • Artur Agvanyan	59	20	Registered
	United Russia	Vladislav Shapsha • Artur Titov • Gennady Novoseltsev • Dmitry Afanasyev • Yelena Loshakova	105	20	Registered
	New People	Anastasia Burlyay • Nikolay Chausov • Vera Tsukanova	67	15	Registered
	Rodina	Vyacheslav Gorbatin • Aleksey Pavlichkov • Vitaly Bichenkov	39	10	Did not file

Party of Direct Democracy, Russian Party of Freedom and Justice and Communists of Russia, which participated in the last election, did not file, while For Truth and Party of Growth have been dissolved since.

=== Single-mandate constituencies ===
20 single-mandate constituencies were formed in Kaluga Oblast. To register candidates in single-mandate constituencies need to collect 3% of signatures of registered voters in the constituency.

Number of candidates in single-mandate constituencies
Party	Candidates	
Party	Nominated	Registered
United Russia	20	20
Communist Party	16	16
Liberal Democratic Party	18	16
New People	18	18
A Just Russia – For Truth	19	19
Party of Pensioners	17	17
Independent	1	0
Total	109	106

== Polls ==
Fieldwork date	Polling firm	UR	LDPR	CPRF	SR-ZP	RPPSS	NL
14 September 2025	2025 election	58.6	9.5	9.5	7.9	5.7	5.5
21–24 August 2025	Russian Field	49.9	13.1	11.8	8.4	5.2	8.9
13 September 2020	2020 election	42.4	8.6	12.9	8.0	7.8	8.1

== Results ==
=== Results by party lists ===
Summary of the 12–14 September 2025 Legislative Assembly of Kaluga Oblast election results
Party	Party list					Constituency		Total	
Party	Votes	%	±pp	Seats	+/–	Seats	+/–	Seats	+/–
United Russia	203,804	58.56	▲16.13	13	▲3	20	▲1	33	▲4
Liberal Democratic Party	33,158	9.53	▲0.93	2	Steady	0	Steady	2	Steady
Communist Party	32,979	9.48	▼3.42	2	▼1	0	Steady	2	▼1
A Just Russia — For Truth	27,407	7.88	▼0.13	1	▼1	0	▼1	1	▼2
Party of Pensioners	19,862	5.71	▼2.13	1	Steady	0	Steady	1	Steady
New People	19,003	5.46	▼2.62	1	▼1	0	Steady	1	▼1
Invalid ballots	11,785	3.39	▼1.35	—	—	—	—	—	—
Total	348,000	100.00	—	20	Steady	20	Steady	40	Steady
Turnout	348,000	44.41	▲9.05	—	—	—	—	—	—
Registered voters	779,003	100.00	—	—	—	—	—	—	—

Gennady Novoseltsev (United Russia) was re-elected as Chairman of the Legislative Assembly, while incumbent Senator Alexander Savin (United Russia) was re-appointed to the Federation Council.

=== Results in single-member constituencies ===
==== District 1 ====
Summary of the 12–14 September 2025 Legislative Assembly of Kaluga Oblast election in District 1
Candidate	Party	Votes	%
Roman Kopteyev	United Russia	7,297	38.01%
Sergey Klishin	Liberal Democratic Party	3,960	20.63%
Ivan Murashov	A Just Russia – For Truth	2,441	12.72%
Nikolay Burkanov	New People	2,147	11.18%
Aleksey Korniyenko	Communist Party	2,091	10.89%
Total		19,197	100%

==== District 2 ====
Summary of the 12–14 September 2025 Legislative Assembly of Kaluga Oblast election in District 2
Candidate	Party	Votes	%
Vitaly Kovalev (incumbent)	United Russia	10,302	42.85%
Nikolay Ivanov	Communist Party	3,935	16.37%
Yevgeny Midarenkov	A Just Russia – For Truth	2,968	12.34%
Marina Trishina	Liberal Democratic Party	2,384	9.92%
Svetlana Fetisova	Party of Pensioners	2,174	9.04%
Yevgeny Maslov	New People	1,425	5.93%
Total		24,044	100%

==== District 3 ====
Summary of the 12–14 September 2025 Legislative Assembly of Kaluga Oblast election in District 3
Candidate	Party	Votes	%
Yury Solovyev (incumbent)	United Russia	7,487	38.03%
Galina Bocharova	A Just Russia – For Truth	3,036	15.42%
Mikhail Yerokhin	Communist Party	2,289	11.63%
Margarita Nekrasova	Party of Pensioners	2,208	11.21%
Sergey Chaban	Liberal Democratic Party	2,167	11.01%
Natalya Khobotova	New People	1,293	6.57%
Total		19,688	100%

==== District 4 ====
Summary of the 12–14 September 2025 Legislative Assembly of Kaluga Oblast election in District 4
Candidate	Party	Votes	%
Aleksandr Kozlov (incumbent)	United Russia	7,653	46.00%
Dmitry Karpov	A Just Russia – For Truth	2,907	17.47%
Olga Semenova	Party of Pensioners	2,382	14.32%
Vladimir Kovshov	Liberal Democratic Party	1,316	7.91%
Oleg Prokhorov	New People	1,240	7.45%
Total		16,638	100%

==== District 5 ====
Summary of the 12–14 September 2025 Legislative Assembly of Kaluga Oblast election in District 5
Candidate	Party	Votes	%
Irina Yashanina (incumbent)	United Russia	14,934	58.13%
Natalya Kondrashkina	Liberal Democratic Party	3,692	14.37%
Yury Korneichev	A Just Russia – For Truth	2,309	8.99%
Pavel Malakhov	New People	2,016	7.85%
Mikhail Solovov	Party of Pensioners	1,814	7.06%
Total		25,692	100%

==== District 6 ====
Summary of the 12–14 September 2025 Legislative Assembly of Kaluga Oblast election in District 6
Candidate	Party	Votes	%
Andrey Novikov	United Russia	11,869	52.94%
Viktor Kireyev	Liberal Democratic Party	2,660	11.86%
Larisa Kozhanova	Party of Pensioners	2,659	11.86%
Mikhail Neganov	Communist Party	2,198	9.80%
Svetlana Zherul	A Just Russia – For Truth	2,038	9.09%
Total		22,421	100%

==== District 7 ====
Summary of the 12–14 September 2025 Legislative Assembly of Kaluga Oblast election in District 7
Candidate	Party	Votes	%
Mikhail Dmitrikov (incumbent)	United Russia	11,544	60.68%
Anna Starovoytova	Party of Pensioners	2,663	14.00%
Eduard Golovachev	A Just Russia – For Truth	1,086	5.71%
Yury Kolb	Liberal Democratic Party	998	5.25%
Yekaterina Agvanyan	Communist Party	931	4.89%
Dmitry Zhavoronkov	New People	853	4.48%
Total		19,024	100%

==== District 8 ====
Summary of the 12–14 September 2025 Legislative Assembly of Kaluga Oblast election in District 8
Candidate	Party	Votes	%
Aleksandr Okunev (incumbent)	United Russia	5,766	42.52%
Marina Kostina	Communist Party	2,153	15.88%
Natalya Muravyeva	Party of Pensioners	1,741	12.84%
Taras Baranchuk	Liberal Democratic Party	1,230	9.07%
Aleksey Gunko	A Just Russia – For Truth	1,033	7.62%
Aleksandr Nikolayev	New People	897	6.62%
Total		13,560	100%

==== District 9 ====
Summary of the 12–14 September 2025 Legislative Assembly of Kaluga Oblast election in District 9
Candidate	Party	Votes	%
Karp Didenko (incumbent)	United Russia	6,442	48.45%
Ivan Lapshin	Communist Party	2,745	20.64%
Margarita Fedulova	New People	2,273	17.09%
Georgy Chanturia	A Just Russia – For Truth	1,006	7.57%
Total		13,297	100%

==== District 10 ====
Summary of the 12–14 September 2025 Legislative Assembly of Kaluga Oblast election in District 10
Candidate	Party	Votes	%
Vadim Vitkov (incumbent)	United Russia	5,251	42.28%
Vitaly Zharkov	Communist Party	2,400	19.33%
Aleksandr Razgonov	Liberal Democratic Party	1,501	12.09%
Dmitry Pontyakov	A Just Russia – For Truth	1,344	10.82%
Yury Grekhov	Party of Pensioners	1,090	8.78%
Total		12,419	100%

==== District 11 ====
Summary of the 12–14 September 2025 Legislative Assembly of Kaluga Oblast election in District 11
Candidate	Party	Votes	%
Yevgeny Churkin	United Russia	4,451	33.54%
Andrey Zykov	Liberal Democratic Party	4,401	33.16%
Aleksey Raspolov	Communist Party	1,550	11.68%
Dmitry Letnik	New People	1,224	9.22%
Sergey Rozhnov	A Just Russia – For Truth	1,147	8.64%
Total		13,272	100%

==== District 12 ====
Summary of the 12–14 September 2025 Legislative Assembly of Kaluga Oblast election in District 12
Candidate	Party	Votes	%
Andrey Litvinov (incumbent)	United Russia	11,706	64.05%
Vladimir Yakushev	New People	2,288	12.52%
Irina Lifanova	Party of Pensioners	1,838	10.06%
Vladimir Starchenko	Communist Party	1,721	9.42%
Total		18,277	100%

==== District 13 ====
Summary of the 12–14 September 2025 Legislative Assembly of Kaluga Oblast election in District 13
Candidate	Party	Votes	%
Sergey Balashov	United Russia	9,349	48.91%
Andrey Artebyakin	A Just Russia – For Truth	3,696	19.34%
Sergey Naryshev	Communist Party	1,586	8.30%
Igor Kryuchkov	Party of Pensioners	1,516	7.93%
Roman Volkov	Liberal Democratic Party	1,255	6.57%
Aleksandr Koltsov	New People	815	4.26%
Total		19,115	100%

==== District 14 ====
Summary of the 12–14 September 2025 Legislative Assembly of Kaluga Oblast election in District 14
Candidate	Party	Votes	%
Andrey Petrov (incumbent)	United Russia	6,404	36.32%
Olga Kirichenko	A Just Russia – For Truth	4,605	26.12%
Nikolay Petrov	Communist Party	3,008	17.06%
Yekaterina Baykova	New People	1,549	8.79%
Yelena Petrushina	Party of Pensioners	1,253	7.11%
Total		17,630	100%

==== District 15 ====
Summary of the 12–14 September 2025 Legislative Assembly of Kaluga Oblast election in District 15
Candidate	Party	Votes	%
Valentina Chistyakova	United Russia	5,797	45.08%
Sergey Klimov	Liberal Democratic Party	2,455	19.09%
Viktoria Kostenko	Party of Pensioners	1,497	11.64%
Konstantin Sobol	A Just Russia – For Truth	1,344	10.45%
Olga Lazareva	New People	965	7.50%
Total		12,859	100%

==== District 16 ====
Summary of the 12–14 September 2025 Legislative Assembly of Kaluga Oblast election in District 16
Candidate	Party	Votes	%
Irina Stroyeva (incumbent)	United Russia	3,966	40.11%
Andrey Yevstifeyev	Communist Party	1,564	15.82%
Igor Kulebyakin	A Just Russia – For Truth	1,223	12.37%
Stepan Oparyshev	Liberal Democratic Party	901	9.11%
Yevgeny Gerasimov	New People	886	8.96%
Natalya Sakharova	Party of Pensioners	743	7.51%
Total		9,888	100%

==== District 17 ====
Summary of the 12–14 September 2025 Legislative Assembly of Kaluga Oblast election in District 17
Candidate	Party	Votes	%
Oleg Komissar (incumbent)	United Russia	5,271	47.74%
Valentina Babanina	Communist Party	1,410	12.77%
Nina Illarionova	A Just Russia – For Truth	1,036	9.38%
Yelena Dzichkovskaya	Liberal Democratic Party	998	9.04%
Stepan Okhryamkin	New People	945	8.56%
Dmitry Yelistratov	Party of Pensioners	836	7.57%
Total		11,041	100%

==== District 18 ====
Summary of the 12–14 September 2025 Legislative Assembly of Kaluga Oblast election in District 18
Candidate	Party	Votes	%
Vladimir Mazurov	United Russia	8,173	42.79%
Yuliana Moseyenkova	A Just Russia – For Truth	3,138	16.43%
Anton Arkhipov	Communist Party	2,705	14.16%
Roman Vybornov	New People	2,428	12.71%
Vladimir Demidov	Party of Pensioners	1,687	8.83%
Total		19,101	100%

==== District 19 ====
Summary of the 12–14 September 2025 Legislative Assembly of Kaluga Oblast election in District 19
Candidate	Party	Votes	%
Tatyana Drozdova (incumbent)	United Russia	9,463	52.19%
Yevgeny Rodin	Liberal Democratic Party	2,723	15.02%
Valentina Fadeyeva	A Just Russia – For Truth	2,274	12.54%
Viktoria Trishechkina	New People	1,370	7.56%
Yevdokia Ukolova	Party of Pensioners	1,250	6.89%
Total		18,132	100%

==== District 20 ====
Summary of the 12–14 September 2025 Legislative Assembly of Kaluga Oblast election in District 20
Candidate	Party	Votes	%
Sergey Verteletsky	United Russia	7,308	38.17%
Viktor Grishin	A Just Russia – For Truth	3,081	16.09%
Vladimir Iost	Liberal Democratic Party	2,115	11.05%
Batyr Bakhmudov	Communist Party	2,036	10.64%
Larisa Minchenkova	New People	2,028	10.59%
Kirill Mirzoyev	Party of Pensioners	1,254	6.55%
Total		19,144	100%

=== Members ===
Incumbent deputies are highlighted with bold, elected members who declined to take a seat are marked with ~~strikethrough~~.

Constituency
No.	Member	Party
1	Roman Kopteyev	United Russia
2	Vitaly Kovalev	United Russia
3	Yury Solovyev	United Russia
4	Aleksandr Kozlov	United Russia
5	Irina Yashanina	United Russia
6	Andrey Novikov	United Russia
7	Mikhail Dmitrikov	United Russia
8	Aleksandr Okunev	United Russia
9	Karp Didenko	United Russia
10	Vadim Vitkov	United Russia
11	Yevgeny Churkin	United Russia
12	Andrey Litvinov	United Russia
13	Sergey Balashov	United Russia
14	Andrey Petrov	United Russia
15	Valentina Chistyakova	United Russia
16	Irina Stroyeva	United Russia
17	Oleg Komissar	United Russia
18	Vladimir Mazurov	United Russia
19	Tatyana Drozdova	United Russia
20	Sergey Verteletsky	United Russia

Party lists
Member	Party
~~Vladislav Shapsha~~	United Russia
Artur Titov	United Russia
Gennady Novoseltsev	United Russia
Dmitry Afanasyev	United Russia
Yelena Loshakova	United Russia
Soslan Takayev	United Russia
Aleksey Slabov	United Russia
Pavel Grankov	United Russia
Alexander Savin	United Russia
~~Nikolay Chernov~~	United Russia
~~Lidia Pishchulina~~	United Russia
~~Irina Shuvalova~~	United Russia
~~Aleksey Kravchenko~~	United Russia
Sergey Kondyurin	United Russia
~~Raisa Vasilenko~~	United Russia
Aleksandr Barkov	United Russia
Kirill Lukiyan	United Russia
Nadezhda Badeyeva	United Russia
Sergey Dmitriyev	United Russia
~~Leonid Slutsky~~	Liberal Democratic Party
~~Vadim Dengin~~	Liberal Democratic Party
Vladimir Nosov	Liberal Democratic Party
Stepan Oparyshev	Liberal Democratic Party
Nikolay Yashkin	Communist Party
Artur Agvanyan	Communist Party
Nadezhda Yefremova	A Just Russia – For Truth
Natalya Terekhova	Party of Pensioners
Anastasia Burlyay	New People

== See also ==
- 2025 Russian regional elections
