= 1996 Russian gubernatorial elections =

- 24 March – 29 December 1996

51 Heads of Federal Subjects from 89
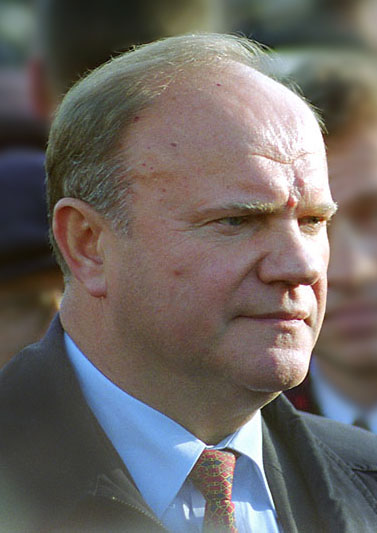

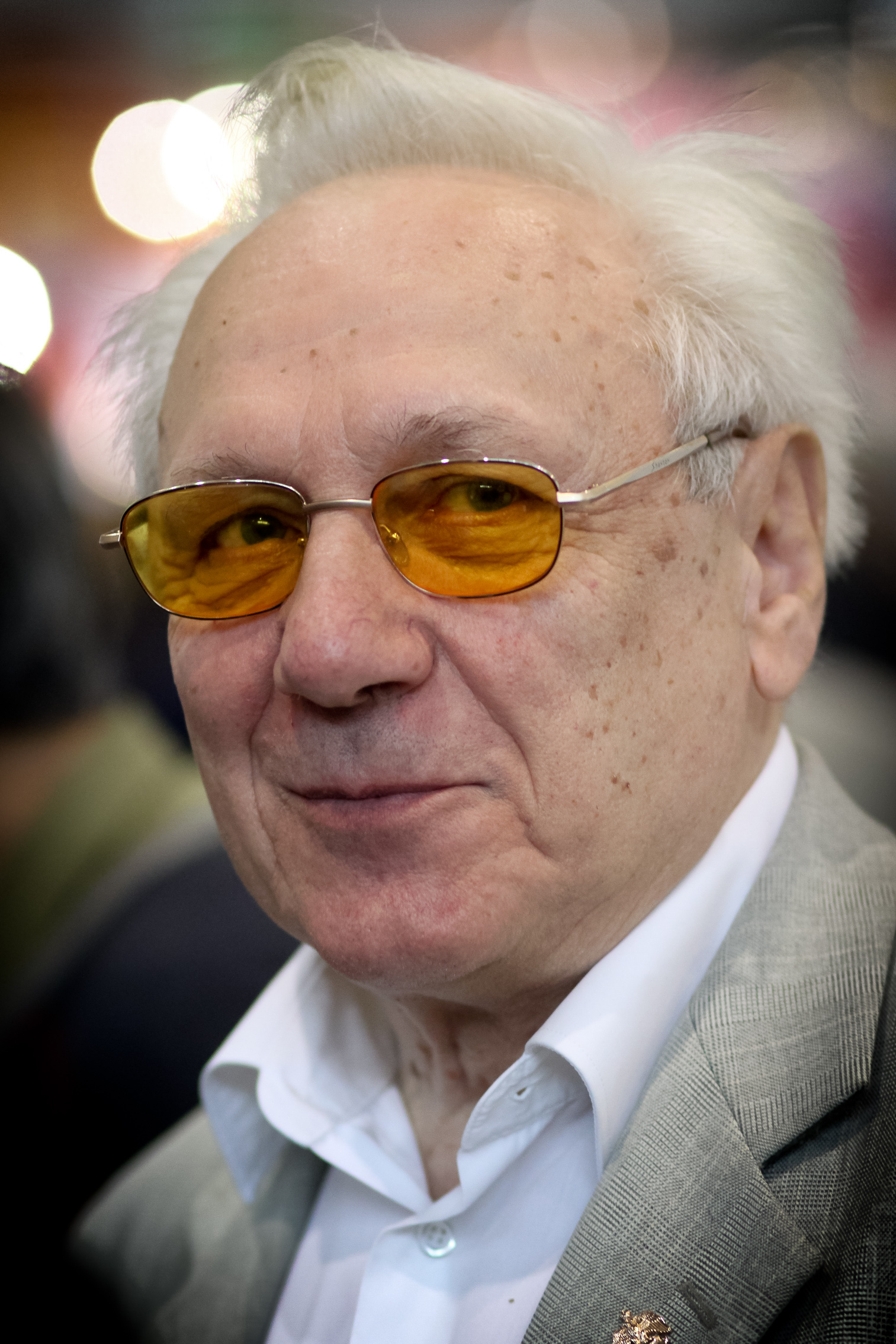
Leader	Gennady Zyuganov	Sergey Filatov
Alliance	People's Patriotic Union of Russia	All-Russian Coordination Council
Seats won	23	17
- 1996 Russian regional elections: Gubernatorial Gubernatorial (of another subject) Two gubernatorial elections (including one of another subject) Legislative Legislative (of another subject) Gubernatorial and legislative Gubernatorial and legislative (both of another subject) Referendum, gubernatorial and legislative

Gubernatorial elections in 1996 took place in 51 regions of the Russian Federation. President of Tatarstan Mintimer Shaymiyev as well as mayors of Moscow and Saint Petersburg Yury Luzhkov and Anatoly Sobchak (all three elected in 1991) went to the re-election, while other regions held their first gubernatorial elections that year. All these campaigns were held after the 1996 Russian presidential election.

== Background ==
In August 1996, two coalitions were presented, which formally became the main participants in the countrywides election campaign. Our Home – Russia, Democratic Choice of Russia, Party of Russian Unity and Accord and 16 other parties and movements loyal to re-elected Boris Yeltsin were united through representation in the All-Russian Coordination Council (OKS). It was opposed by the People's Patriotic Union of Russia (NPSR) associated with the Communist Party of the Russian Federation and its allies. Former Kremlin Chief of Staff Sergei Filatov was appointed the head of OKS, while NPSR was headed by Gennady Zyuganov, leader of CPRF.

NPSR initially announced the lists of approved candidates publicly and centrally, but by the end of the campaign it gave a significant part of the initiative to the localities. In some cases, the support was unilateral (without public commitment of the candidate). Among the candidates supported by NPSR were three incumbent governors, and in three regions the alliance observed neutrality. OKS supported mainly the incumbent governors. As a result of the autumn-winter electoral marathon, 22 out of 49 running incumbents re-elected. The second tours in Mari El and Tyumen Oblast moved to 1997, as well as recall elections in Amur Oblast, Agin-Buryat and Evenk Autonomous Okrugs.

== Results ==
=== First half of the year ===
Federal subject	Incumbent	Incumbent since	Election day	Candidates	Result
Tatarstan (snap election)	Mintimer Shaymiyev	1991	24 March	✓ Mintimer Shaymiyev 97.14% (ran unopposed)	Incumbent re-elected.
Saint Petersburg	Anatoly Sobchak	1991	19 May (first round)	Anatoly Sobchak 29.02%; Vladimir Yakovlev 21.58%; Yury Boldyrev 17.09%; Yuri Sevenard 10.02%; Aleksandr Belyakov 9.82%	Incumbent lost re-election. New governor elected.
Saint Petersburg	Anatoly Sobchak	1991	2 June (runoff)	✓ Vladimir Yakovlev 47.49%; Anatoly Sobchak 45.76%	Incumbent lost re-election. New governor elected.
Moscow	Yury Luzhkov	1992	16 June	✓ Yury Luzhkov / Valery Shantsev 88.49%; Olga Sergeyeva / Stanislav Terekhov 4.94%; Aleksandr Krasnov / Nikolay Moskvichyov 3.31%	Incumbent elected to full term.

=== September–November ===
Federal subject	Incumbent	Incumbent since	Election day	Candidates	Result
Saratov Oblast	Dmitry Ayatskov	1996	1 September	✓ Dmitry Ayatskov (NDR/OKS, APR) 80.19%; Anatoly Gordeyev (CPRF/NPSR) 16.06%	Incumbent elected to full term.
Amur Oblast	Yury Lyashko	1996	22 September	Anatoly Belonogov (NPSR) 41.10%; Yury Lyashko (OKS) 41.02%; Pavel Stein 9.34%; Against all 6.94%	Election results annulled. Revote called for 23 March 1997 (see 1997 elections).
Leningrad Oblast	Aleksandr Belyakov	1991	29 September	✓ Vadim Gustov (NPSR) 53.37%; Aleksandr Belyakov (OKS) 31.66%; Against all 5.06%	Incumbent lost election. New governor elected.
Rostov Oblast	Vladimir Chub	1991	29 September	✓ Vladimir Chub (OKS) 62.16%; Leonid Ivanchenko (NPSR) 31.60%	Incumbent elected to full term.
Vologda Oblast	Vyacheslav Pozgalyov	1996	6 October	✓ Vyacheslav Pozgalyov 80.69%; Mikhail Surov 4.21%; Mikhail Beznin (CPRF/NPSR) 3.22%; Nikolay Podgornov 3.18%	Incumbent elected to full term.
Kaliningrad Oblast	Yuri Matochkin	1991	6 October (first round)	Yuri Matochkin (OKS) 31.33%; Leonid Gorbenko 22.29%; Yury Semyonov (CPRF) 21.65%; Viktor Vasilyev 5.41%; Against all 6.58%	Incumbent lost election. New governor elected.
Kaliningrad Oblast	Yuri Matochkin	1991	20 October (runoff)	✓ Leonid Gorbenko (supported by CPRF/NPSR) 49.56%; Yuri Matochkin (OKS) 40.44%; Against all 8.29%	Incumbent lost election. New governor elected.
Kirov Oblast	Vasily Desyatnikov	1991	6 October (first round)	Vladimir Sergeyenkov (NPSR) 39.64%; Gennady Shtin 30.54%; Vasily Desyatnikov (OKS) 18.20%; Pyotr Polyantsev 5.63%	Incumbent lost election. New governor elected.
Kirov Oblast	Vasily Desyatnikov	1991	20 October (runoff)	✓ Vladimir Sergeyenkov (NPSR) 50.46%; Gennady Shtin (supported by NDR, Yabloko) 45.45%	Incumbent lost election. New governor elected.
Yamalo-Nenets AO	Yury Neyolov	1994	13 October	✓ Yury Neyolov (OKS) 68.88%; Vladimir Goman 22.77%	Incumbent elected to full term.
Kursk Oblast	Vasily Shuteyev	1991	20 October	✓ Alexander Rutskoy (Derzhava/NPSR) 76.85%; Vasily Shuteyev (OKS) 17.55%	Incumbent lost election. New governor elected.
Pskov Oblast	Vladislav Tumanov	1992	20 October (first round)	Vladislav Tumanov (supported by OKS, Yabloko) 30.92%; Yevgeny Mikhailov (LDPR) 22.71%; Vladimir Sidorenko (APR) 14.93%; Ivan Komar (Honour and Homeland) 14.09%; Vitaly Pushkaryov 10.94%	Incumbent lost election. New governor elected.
Pskov Oblast	Vladislav Tumanov	1992	3 November (runoff)	✓ Yevgeny Mikhailov (LDPR, NPSR) 56.46%; Vladislav Tumanov (OKS) 36.89%; Against all 5.32%	Incumbent lost election. New governor elected.
Sakhalin Oblast	Igor Farkhutdinov	1995	20 October	✓ Igor Farkhutdinov (OKS) 39.47%; Anatoly Chyorny (NPSR) 27.20%; Nikolay Dolgikh 9.44%; Vladimir Bersenev (Yabloko) 7.21%	Incumbent elected to full term.
Jewish AO	Nikolay Volkov	1991	20 October	✓ Nikolay Volkov (supported by OKS, Yabloko) 70.09%; Sergey Leskov 16.28%; Against all 11.50%	Incumbent elected to full term.
Krasnodar Krai	Nikolai Yegorov	1996	27 October	Nikolai Kondratenko (NPSR) 57.17%; Nikolai Yegorov 24.75%; Viktor Krokhmal (Honour and Homeland) 7.79%; Boris Vavilov (LDPR) 2.33%; Yevgeny Kharitonov (OKS) 2.00%	Election results annulled. Revote called for 22 December 1996 (see below).
Stavropol Krai	Pyotr Marchenko	1995	27 October (first round)	Alexander Chernogorov (CPRF/NPSR) 47.80%; Pyotr Marchenko (NDR, supported by OKS, Yabloko) 37.63%	Incumbent lost election. New governor elected.
Stavropol Krai	Pyotr Marchenko	1995	17 November (runoff)	✓ Alexander Chernogorov (CPRF/NPSR) 55.10%; Pyotr Marchenko (NDR/OKS) 40.15%	Incumbent lost election. New governor elected.
Kaluga Oblast	Oleg Savchenko	1996	27 October (first round)	Valery Sudarenkov (supported by NPSR and Yabloko) 45.76%; Oleg Savchenko (OKS) 39.63%; Gennady Pushkin (LDPR) 3.57%	Incumbent lost election. New governor elected.
Kaluga Oblast	Oleg Savchenko	1996	9 November (runoff)	✓ Valery Sudarenkov (NPSR) 63.51%; Oleg Savchenko (OKS) 30.48%	Incumbent lost election. New governor elected.
Chita Oblast	Ravil Geniatulin	1996	27 October	✓ Ravil Geniatulin (OKS) 30.76%; Yaroslav Shvyryayev 22.89%; Vladimir Bogatov (LDPR) 19.55%; Viktor Kurochkin (supported by DR and Yabloko) 10.98%; Viktor Kolesnikov (APR/NPSR) 7.14%	Incumbent elected to full term.
Agin-Buryat AO	Bolot Ayushiyev	1996	27 October	Bolot Ayushiyev 46.71%; Yury Dondokov 46.16%	Election results annulled. Revote called for 23 February 1997 (see 1997 elections).
Khanty-Mansi AO	Alexander Filipenko	1991	27 October	✓ Alexander Filipenko (OKS, NPSR) 71.49%; Gennady Korepanov 11.18%; Against all 14.82%	Incumbent elected to full term.
Magadan Oblast	Viktor Mikhailov	1991	3 November	✓ Valentin Tsvetkov (NPSR, Yabloko) 45.96%; Viktor Mikhailov (OKS) 41.31%; Against all 8.22%	Incumbent lost election. New governor elected.
Altai Krai	Lev Korshunov	1994	17 November (first round)	Alexander Surikov (NPSR) 46.92%; Lev Korshunov (OKS) 43.39%	Incumbent lost election. New governor elected.
Altai Krai	Lev Korshunov	1994	1 December (runoff)	✓ Alexander Surikov (NPSR) 49.36%; Lev Korshunov (OKS) 46.14%	Incumbent lost election. New governor elected.
Kamchatka Oblast	Vladimir Biryukov	1991	17 November (first round)	Vladimir Biryukov (OKS) 47.67%; Boris Oleynikov 10.65%; Mikhail Kulak 9.36%; Nikolay Tokmantsev 8.02%; Against all 10.40%	Incumbent elected to full term.
Kamchatka Oblast	Vladimir Biryukov	1991	1 December (runoff)	✓ Vladimir Biryukov (OKS) 60.96%; Boris Oleynikov 27.80%	Incumbent elected to full term.
Murmansk Oblast	Yevgeny Komarov	1991	17 November (first round)	Yevgeny Komarov (OKS) 31.09%; Yury Yevdokimov 20.10%; Mikhail Zub 13.92%; Boris Vorobyov (LDPR) 10.15%; Vasily Kalayda (NPSR) 7.14%; Igor Lebedev (Yabloko) 4.93%	Incumbent lost election. New governor elected.
Murmansk Oblast	Yevgeny Komarov	1991	1 December (runoff)	✓ Yury Yevdokimov (NPSR) 43.45%; Yevgeny Komarov (OKS) 40.64%	Incumbent lost election. New governor elected.
Komi-Permyak AO	Nikolay Poluyanov	1991	17 November	✓ Nikolay Poluyanov (OKS, NPSR) 69.63%; Anatoly Fedoseyev (Constitutional Party) 15.26%; Against all 7.25%	Incumbent elected to full term.
Koryak AO	Sergey Lyoushkin	1991	17 November	✓ Valentina Bronevich (NPSR) (Note: Nina Solodyakova, NPSR's original candidate, withdrew from the election and endorsed Bronevich.) 47.13%; Sergey Lyoushkin (OKS) 25.58%; Nikolay Savelyev 9.92%; Against all 8.76%	Incumbent lost election. New governor elected.
Ust-Orda Buryat AO	Aleksey Batagayev	1991	17 November	✓ Valery Maleyev 37.34%; Aleksey Batagayev (OKS) 26.84%; Ivan Ivanov (CPRF) 25.70%	Incumbent lost election. New governor elected. Independent gain.
Kurgan Oblast	Anatoly Sobolev	1995	24 November (first round)	Oleg Bogomolov (NPSR) 40.87%; Anatoly Koltashov (Yabloko) 33.14%; Anatoly Sobolev (OKS) 12.92%; Against all 10.45%	Incumbent lost election. New governor elected.
Kurgan Oblast	Anatoly Sobolev	1995	8 December (runoff)	✓ Oleg Bogomolov (NPSR) 66.29%; Against all 31.97%	Incumbent lost election. New governor elected.

=== December ===
Federal subject	Incumbent	Incumbent since	Election day	Candidates	Result
Khakassia	Yevgeny Smirnov	1992	1 December (first round)	Aleksey Lebed (Honour and Homeland) 42.10%; Yevgeny Reznikov 17.00%; Yevgeny Smirnov (NDR, CPRF) 11.06%; Yury Shpigalskikh 5.88%; Valery Shavyrkin 4.98%; Nikolay Bulakin (OKS) 4.76%; Against all 5.52%	Incumbent lost election. New premier elected.
Khakassia	Yevgeny Smirnov	1992	22 December (runoff)	✓ Aleksey Lebed 71.85%; Yevgeny Reznikov 19.77%; Against all 6.52%	Incumbent lost election. New premier elected.
Ivanovo Oblast	Vladislav Tikhomirov	1996	1 December	✓ Vladislav Tikhomirov (OKS) 50.12%; Sergey Sirotkin (LDPR) 23.86%; Nikolay Lobayev (DVR) 9.41%; Ivan Pimenov (CPRF/NPSR) 7.71%; Against all 6.11%	Incumbent elected to full term.
Samara Oblast	Konstantin Titov	1991	1 December	✓ Konstantin Titov (NDR/OKS, Yabloko, DVR) 63.39%; Valentin Romanov (CPRF/NPSR) 29.86%	Incumbent elected to full term.
Nenets AO	Vladimir Khabarov	1996	1 December (first round)	Vladimir Khabarov (OKS) 40.64%; Vladimir Butov 21.99%; Yury Komarovsky 15.30%; Valentin Varankin 5.48%; Against all 8.35%	Incumbent lost election. New governor elected.
Nenets AO	Vladimir Khabarov	1996	13 December (runoff)	✓ Vladimir Butov 48.46%; Vladimir Khabarov (OKS) 40.27%; Against all 9.74%	Incumbent lost election. New governor elected.
Khabarovsk Krai	Viktor Ishayev	1991	8 December	✓ Viktor Ishayev (OKS/local NPSR) 76.93%; Valentin Tsoi 7.23%; Vadim Mantulov 5.03%; Against all 6.24%	Incumbent elected to full term.
Arkhangelsk Oblast	Anatoly Yefremov	1996	8 December (first round)	Anatoly Yefremov (OKS) 34.54%; Yury Guskov (CPRF/NPSR) 28.85%; Pavel Pozdeyev 21.35%; Aleksandr Ivanov (supported by DVR, Yabloko) 5.42%; Against all 7.73%	Incumbent elected to full term.
Arkhangelsk Oblast	Anatoly Yefremov	1996	22 December (runoff)	✓ Anatoly Yefremov (OKS, Yabloko) 58.67%; Yury Guskov (CPRF/NPSR) 33.24%	Incumbent elected to full term.
Astrakhan Oblast	Anatoly Guzhvin	1991	8 December	✓ Anatoly Guzhvin (NDR/OKS) 52.45%; Vyacheslav Zvolinsky (CPRF/NPSR) 39.79%	Incumbent elected to full term.
Bryansk Oblast	Aleksandr Semernyov	1996	8 December	✓ Yury Lodkin (CPRF/NPSR) 54.54%; Aleksandr Semernyov (OKS) 25.81%; Vladimir Barabanov 5.57%	Incumbent lost election. New governor elected.
Vladimir Oblast	Yury Vlasov	1991	8 December	✓ Nikolay Vinogradov (CPRF/NPSR) 62.29%; Yury Vlasov (OKS) 21.71%	Incumbent lost election. New governor elected.
Voronezh Oblast	Aleksandr Tsapin	1996	8 December	✓ Ivan Shabanov (CPRF/NPSR) 48.97%; Aleksandr Tsapin (OKS) 41.02%	Incumbent lost election. New governor elected.
Kostroma Oblast	Valery Arbuzov	1991	8 December (first round)	Viktor Shershunov (CPRF/NPSR) 41.72%; Valery Arbuzov (NDR/OKS, Yabloko) 27.33%; Nikolay Romanov (supported by LDPR, DR) 21.28%	Incumbent lost election. New governor elected.
Kostroma Oblast	Valery Arbuzov	1991	22 December (runoff)	✓ Viktor Shershunov (CPRF/NPSR) 64.10%; Valery Arbuzov (NDR/OKS, Yabloko) 30.24%	Incumbent lost election. New governor elected.
Perm Oblast	Gennady Igumnov	1996	8 December (first round)	Gennady Igumnov (OKS) 42.38%; Sergey Levitan 26.89%; Vladimir Ilyinykh 7.79%; Yury Perkhun (CPRF) 4.89%; Against all 7.17%	Incumbent elected to full term.
Perm Oblast	Gennady Igumnov	1996	22 December (runoff)	✓ Gennady Igumnov (OKS) 63.86%; Sergey Levitan 29.08%	Incumbent elected to full term.
Ryazan Oblast	Igor Ivlev	1996	8 December (first round)	Vyacheslav Lyubimov (CPRF/NPSR) 38.29%; Igor Ivlev (APR/OKS) 29.55%; Valery Kalashnikov (OKS) 14.03%; Viktor Milekhin 8.93%; Against all 5.07%	Incumbent lost election. New governor elected.
Ryazan Oblast	Igor Ivlev	1996	22 December (runoff)	✓ Vyacheslav Lyubimov (CPRF/NPSR) 56.06%; Igor Ivlev 38.36%	Incumbent lost election. New governor elected.
Mari El	Vladislav Zotin	1991	22 December (first round)	Vyacheslav Kislitsyn (CPRF/NPSR) 47.37%; Leonid Markelov (LDPR) 29.21%; Vladislav Zotin (OKS) 9.77%	Incumbent lost re-election. New president elected.
Mari El	Vladislav Zotin	1991	4 January 1997 (runoff)	✓ Vyacheslav Kislitsyn (CPRF/NPSR) 58.89%; Leonid Markelov (LDPR) 36.24%	Incumbent lost re-election. New president elected.
Sakha (Yakutia)	Mikhail Nikolayev	1991	22 December	✓ Mikhail Nikolayev (OKS) 58.96%; Artur Alekseyev (CPRF) 25.46%	Incumbent re-elected.
Krasnodar Krai (revote)	Nikolai Yegorov	1996	22 December	✓ Nikolai Kondratenko (CPRF/NPSR) 82.00%; Viktor Krokhmal (Honour and Homeland) 7.18%; Nikolai Yegorov 4.83%	Incumbent lost election. New governor elected.
Volgograd Oblast	Ivan Shabunin	1991	22 December (first round)	Ivan Shabunin (OKS, supported by APR) 37.64%; Nikolay Maksyuta (NPSR) 28.51%; Yury Chekhov (OKS) 25.22%	Incumbent lost election. New governor elected.
Volgograd Oblast	Ivan Shabunin	1991	29 December (runoff)	✓ Nikolay Maksyuta (NPSR) 50.96%; Ivan Shabunin (OKS) 44.15%	Incumbent lost election. New governor elected.
Tyumen Oblast	Leonid Roketsky	1993	22 December (first round)	Leonid Roketsky (OKS) 42.01%; Sergey Atroshenko 23.87%; Gennady Raikov 8.45%; Anatoly Cherepanov (RCWP) 8.44%	Incumbent elected to full term.
Tyumen Oblast	Leonid Roketsky	1993	12 January 1997 (runoff)	✓ Leonid Roketsky (OKS) 58.83%; Sergey Atroshenko 32.94%	Incumbent elected to full term.
Ulyanovsk Oblast	Yury Goryachev	1992	22 December	✓ Yury Goryachev (supported by NDR and Yabloko) 42.48%; Aleksandr Kruglikov (CPRF/NPSR) 33.71%; Nikolay Semashin 7.63%; Viktor Bartkaitis 5.63%; Yury Cheburov (OKS) 7.62%	Incumbent elected to full term.
Chelyabinsk Oblast	Vadim Solovyov	1991	22 December	✓ Pyotr Sumin (NPSR) 50.79%; Vadim Solovyov (OKS) 15.99%; Vladimir Grigoriadi 8.58%; Vladimir Golovlyov (DVR) 6.49%	Incumbent lost election. New governor elected.
Taymyr AO	Gennady Nedelin	1991	22 December	✓ Gennady Nedelin (OKS) 65.70%; Gennady Subbotkin 11.30%	Incumbent elected to full term.
Chukotka AO	Aleksandr Nazarov	1991	22 December	✓ Aleksandr Nazarov (OKS) 65.18%; Vladimir Yetylin 21.04%	Incumbent elected to full term.
Evenk AO	Anatoly Yakimov	1991	22 December	Aleksandr Bokovikov (NPSR) 35.52%; Anatoly Yakimov (OKS) 34.62%; Viktor Gayulsky (NDR) 13.12%	Election results annulled. Revote called for 23 March 1997 (see 1997 elections).

== Sources ==
- Ivanov, Vitaly (2019). Глава субъекта Российской Федерации. История губернаторов [Head of the subject of the Russian Federation. History of governors] (in Russian). ISBN 978-5-907250-14-7.
