= Governor of Kaluga Oblast =

Highest-ranking official in Kaluga Oblast, Russia

- Coat of arms of Kaluga Oblast

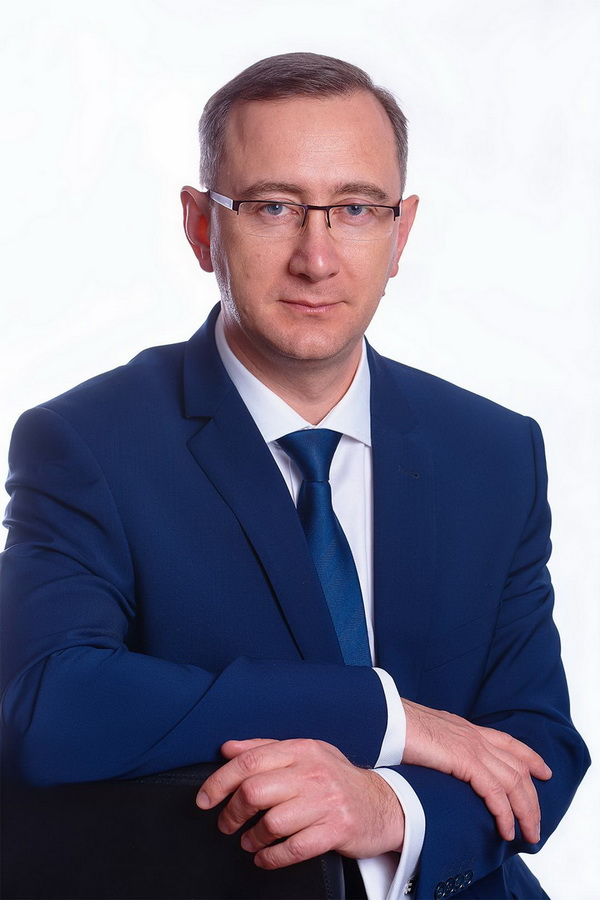
- Incumbent; Vladislav Shapsha since 16 September 2020
- Seat: Kaluga
- Term length: 5 years
- Constituting instrument: Charter of Kaluga Oblast, Section 7
- Formation: 1991
- First holder: Aleksandr Deryagin
- Website: www.admoblkaluga.ru

The Governor of Kaluga Oblast (Russian: Губернатор Калужской области) is the head of government of Kaluga Oblast, a federal subject of Russia.

The position was introduced in 1991 as Head of Administration. The title of office was changed to Governor after the Charter of Kaluga Oblast was adopted on 27 March 1996.

== List of officeholders ==
No.	Portrait	Governor	Tenure	Time in office	Party	Vice governor	Election
1		Aleksandr Deryagin (1941–2010)	25 September 1991 – 22 January 1996 (resigned)	4 years, 119 days	Independent	Office did not exist	Appointed
—		Viktor Pakhno (born 1938)	23 January 1996 – 7 March 1996	42 days	Independent	Office did not exist	Acting
2		Oleg Savchenko (born 1948)	7 March 1996 – 14 November 1996 (lost election)	252 days	Independent	Viktor Pakhno	Appointed
3		Valery Sudarenkov (born 1940)	14 November 1996 – 18 November 2000 (retired)	4 years, 4 days	Independent	Anatoly Artamonov	1996
4		Anatoly Artamonov (born 1952)	18 November 2000 – 11 June 2015 (resigned)	19 years, 87 days	Independent → United Russia	Yevgeny Moiseyev (2000–2003)	2000; 2004; 2005 (Note: Appointed by the president of Russia with the consent of the Legislative Assembly of Kaluga Oblast.); 2010
4		Anatoly Artamonov (born 1952)	18 November 2000 – 11 June 2015 (resigned)	19 years, 87 days	Independent → United Russia	Office abolished	2000; 2004; 2005; 2010
—		Anatoly Artamonov (born 1952)	11 June 2015 – 19 September 2015	19 years, 87 days	Independent → United Russia	Office abolished	Acting
(4)		Anatoly Artamonov (born 1952)	19 September 2015 – 13 February 2020 (resigned)	19 years, 87 days	Independent → United Russia	Office abolished	2015
—		Vladislav Shapsha (born 1972)	13 February 2020 – 16 September 2020	6 years, 266 days	United Russia	Office abolished	Acting
5		Vladislav Shapsha (born 1972)	16 September 2020 – present	6 years, 266 days	United Russia	Office abolished	2020; 2025
