= Alexander Savin (politician) =

Russian politician (born 1962)

- Александр Савин
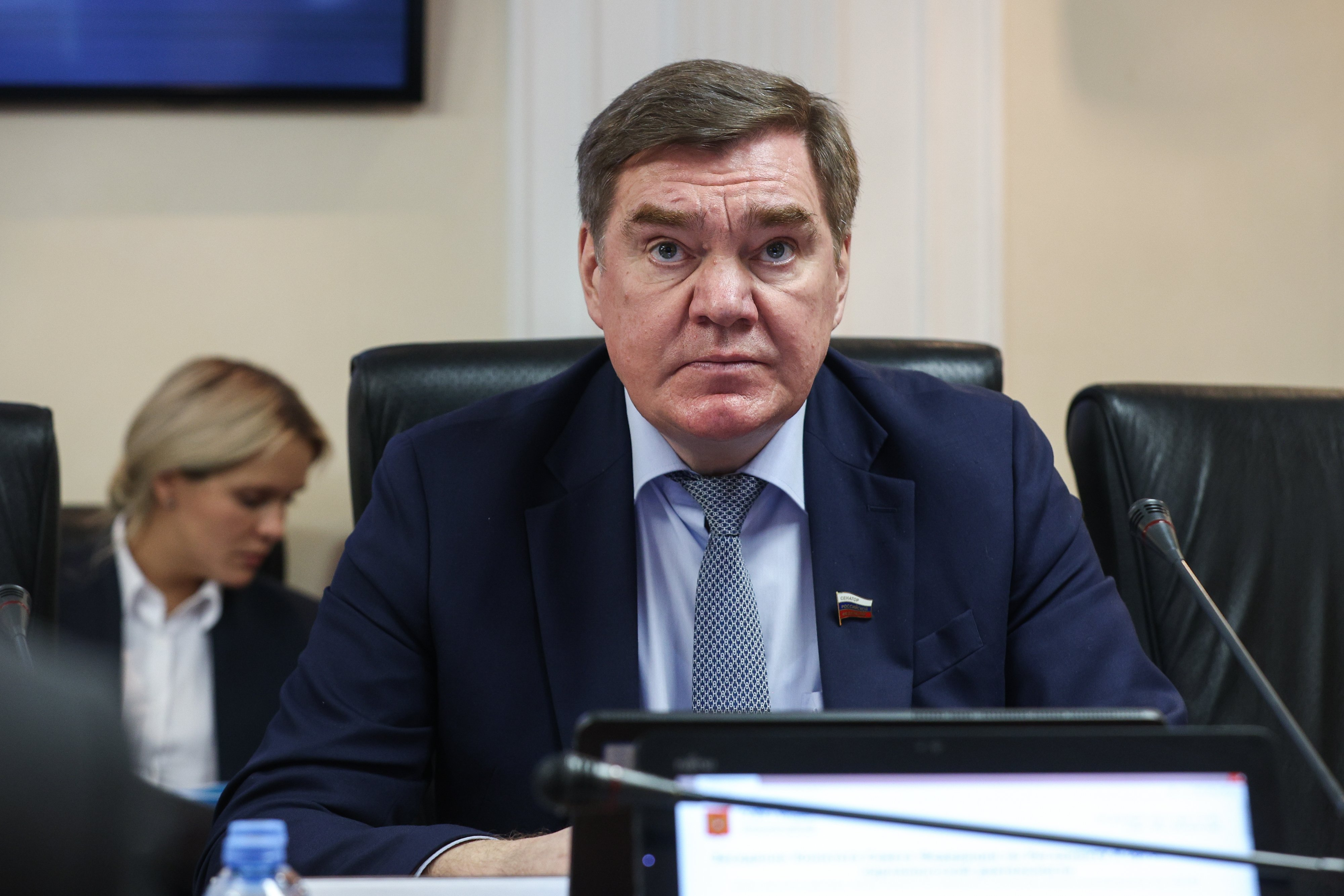

Senator from Kaluga Oblast
- Incumbent
- Assumed office 24 September 2020
- Preceded by: Aleksey Aleksandrov

Personal details
- Born: Alexander Savin; 28 January 1962 (age 64) Bryansk, Russian Soviet Federative Socialist Republic, Soviet Union
- Party: United Russia
- Education: Bryansk State Technical University, Russian Presidential Academy of National Economy and Public Administration

Alexander Alexanderovich Savin (Russian: Александр Александрович Савин; born 28 January 1962) is a Russian politician serving as a senator from Kaluga Oblast since 24 September 2020.

== Biography ==
Alexander Savin was born on 28 January 1962 in Bryansk. In 1983, he graduated from the Bryansk State Technical University. In 2008, he also received a degree from the Russian Presidential Academy of National Economy and Public Administration. From 1983 to 2004, he worked as an engineer at the Institute for High Energy Physics. From 2005 to 2010, he was the Adviser of the Department of Regional Policy of the Office of the President of the Russian Federation for Domestic Policy. From 2010 to 2012, he was promoted to the Head of the Department of Regional Policy of the Office of the President of the Russian Federation for Domestic Policy. In 2012, he was appointed the Chief Federal Inspector for the Kaluga Oblast of the Office of the Plenipotentiary Representatives of the President of the Russian Federation in the Central Federal District. On 14 September 2020, he became the senator from the Legislative Assembly of Kaluga Oblast.

Alexander Savin is under personal sanctions introduced by the European Union, the United Kingdom, the USA, Canada, Switzerland, Australia, Ukraine, New Zealand, for ratifying the decisions of the "Treaty of Friendship, Cooperation and Mutual Assistance between the Russian Federation and the Donetsk People's Republic and between the Russian Federation and the Luhansk People's Republic" and providing political and economic support for Russia's annexation of Ukrainian territories.
