= Yury Volkov =

Russian politician (born 1954)

- Юрий Волков
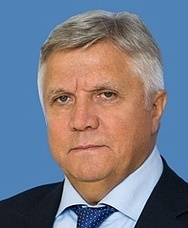
- Official portrait, 2015

Russian Federation Senator from Kaluga Oblast
- In office 21 September 2015 – 22 January 2020
- Preceded by: Valery Sudarenkov
- Succeeded by: Anatoly Artamonov

Member of the State Duma
- In office 2003–2015

Russian Federation Senator from the Nenets Autonomous Okrug
- In office 31 January 2002 – 26 September 2002
- Succeeded by: Aleksandr Sabadash

Russian Federation Senator from the Komi Republic
- In office 25 April 2001 – 23 January 2002
- Succeeded by: Rakhim Azimov

Personal details
- Born: Yury Nikolayevich Volkov; 19 September 1954 (age 72) Leningrad, Soviet Union
- Party: United Russia

Yury Nikolayevich Volkov (Russian: Юрий Николаевич Волков; born 19 September 1954), is a Russian politician who had served as the Member of the Federation Council from the executive authority of Kaluga Oblast.

He had also been a member of the State Duma of the VI convocation from United Russia, and Deputy Chairman of the State Duma IV from 2005 to 2007, V from 2007 to 2011 convocations.

He is a member of the Supreme Council of the United Russia party.

== Biography ==
Yury Volkov was born on 19 September 1954 in Leningrad.

In 1982, he graduated from the Leningrad State University. From 1982 to 1983, he was an assistant of the Department of Civil Procedure, Faculty of Law, at Leningrad State University.

From January 1983 to February 1991, Volkov served in the Soviet Army. According to the Kommersant newspaper, he served in the state security agencies.

In 1991, he was an assistant to the General Director of JV KTB "Continent". From 1992 to 1995, he was the General Director of CJSC "Alexander Nevsky". From April 1995 to August 1996, he was the Chief Specialist of the Department for Work with Law Enforcement Bodies of the Office of Administrative Bodies of the Mayor's Office of St. Petersburg.

From August 1996 to May 1998, he was the Deputy Head of the Administration of the Petrogradsky District of the City Hall of St. Petersburg. From July 1998 to July 2000, he was the First Deputy General Director of the State Enterprise Fuel and Energy Complex of St. Petersburg.

From 2000 to 2001, Volkov was the head of the Office for Work with Authorities of the Subjects of Russia of the North-Western Federal District.

On 25 April 2001, Volkov was the representative of the executive authority of the Komi Republic in the Federation Council.

From 2001 to 2002, he was the Plenipotentiary Representative of the Federation Council in the General Prosecutor's Office of Russia. He was a member of the Federation Council Committee on International Affairs.

On 31 January 2002, he was a member of the Federation Council from the executive authority of the Nenets Autonomous Okrug.

From 2002 to 2003, he was an advisor to the Chairman of the Federation Council.

In 2003, Volkov was a member of the State Duma. He was a member of the State Duma Committee on Information Policy.

From 21 September 2015 to 22 January 2020, Volkov was a member of the Federation Council from the executive authority of the Kaluga Oblast.
