= Aleksey Aleksandrov =

Russian lawyer, businessman, and politician

- Алексей Александров
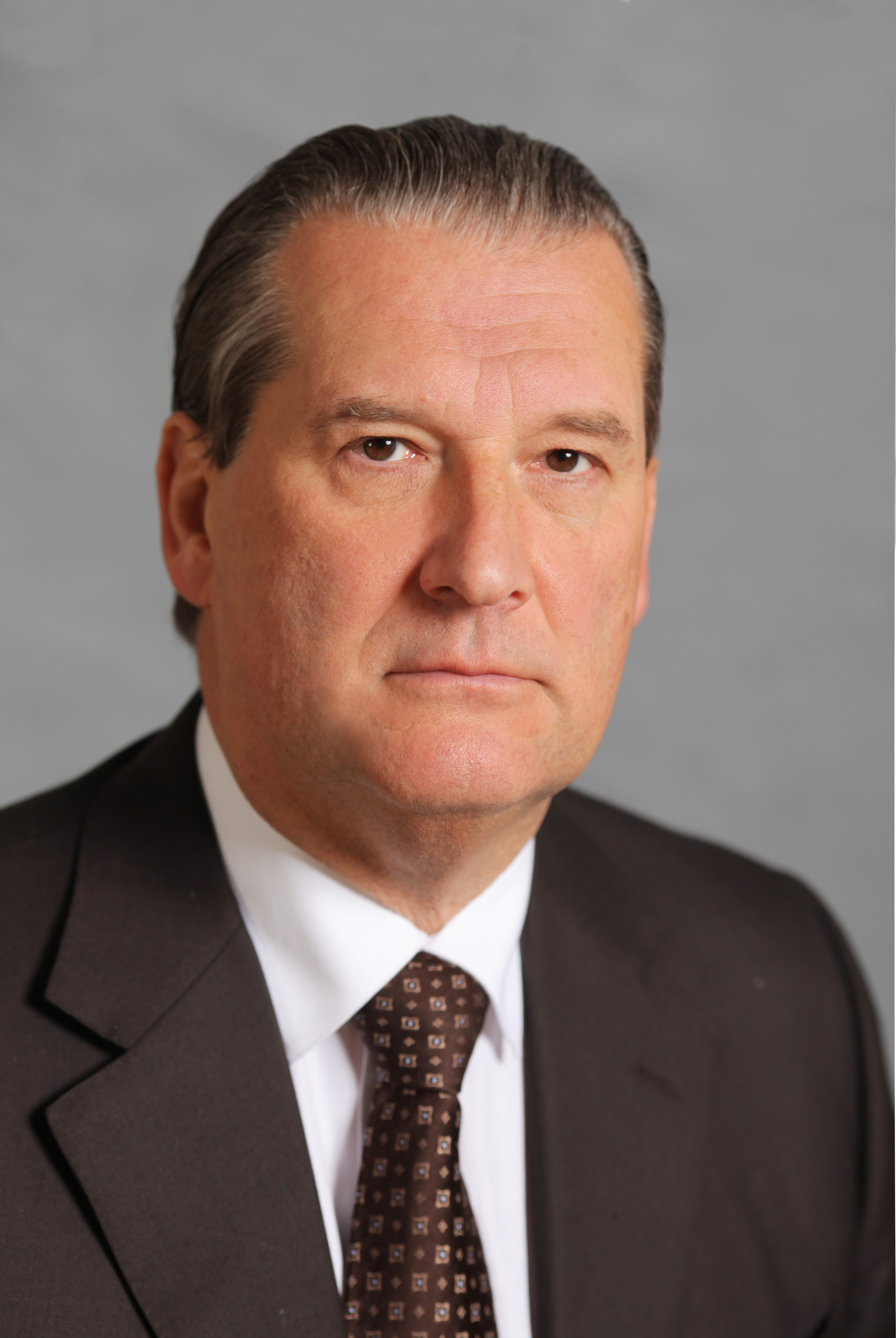

Senator from Kaluga Oblast
- In office 12 April 2004 – 24 September 2020
- Preceded by: Viktor Kolesnikov
- Succeeded by: Alexander Savin

Personal details
- Born: Aleksey Aleksandrov; 3 May 1952 (age 74) Leningrad, Russian Soviet Federative Socialist Republic, Soviet Union
- Party: Our Home – Russia, United Russia
- Education: Leningrad State University

Aleksey Ivanovich Aleksandrov (Russian: Алексе́й Ива́нович Алекса́ндров; born 3 May 1952) is a Russian lawyer, businessman, and politician.

From 1993 to 2003, he was a deputy of the State Duma, first from Our Home – Russia, then from Unity and then United Russia. From 2004, he was the representative of Kaluga Oblast in the Federation Council of Russia.

== Biography ==
He was born on 3 May 1952 in Leningrad. His father is an economist, and his mother is a librarian.

Since childhood, Aleksandrov dreamed of becoming a lawyer, from 1968 he studied at the School of Young Lawyer at the Leningrad State University, where he attended lectures by outstanding lawyers, professors Alekseeva, Krylova, Lukashevich, Elkind, judges Ermakova, prosecutor Solovyov, lawyer Kiselyov.

He founded the insurance company Rus (Russian: Акционерное страховое общество (АСК) "Русь") which held a stake in the September 1990 founding of the regional committee bank (Russian: банк обкома) Bank Rossiya which in 1991 became a joint venture.

== Honours and awards ==
- Order of Merit for the Fatherland, 4th class (19 November 2007) - for services in regulatory affairs, strengthening and development of the Russian state
- Medal of the Order "For Merit to the Fatherland", 2nd class (21 September 2002) - for services to strengthen the rule of law, an active law-making and long-term diligent work
- Jubilee Medal "300 Years of the Russian Navy" (1996)
- Medal "In Commemoration of the 850th Anniversary of Moscow" (1997)
- Medal "In Commemoration of the 300th Anniversary of Saint Petersburg" (2003)
- Merited Lawyer of the Russian Federation (18 December 1996) - for services to strengthen the rule of law and many years of honest work
- Honour the Russian FSB
