= Gennady Nedelin =

Russian politician

- Геннадий Неделин
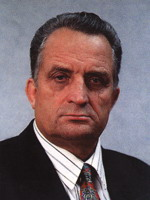

1st Governor (Head) of Taymyr Autonomous Okrug
- In office 18 November 1991 – 28 October 2001
- Succeeded by: Alexander Khloponin

Personal details
- Born: 28 May 1938 (age 87) Klyuchi, Minusinsky District, Krasnoyarsk Krai, Russian SFSR, Soviet Union

Genndady Pavlovich Nedelin (Russian: Геннадий Павлович Неделин; born 28 May 1938), is a Russian politician who had served as the first Governor (Head) of Taymyr Autonomous Okrug from 1991 to 2001.

== Biography ==
Gennady Nedelin was born on 20 May 1938 in Klyuchi, Krasnoyarsk Krai, and was the second child in the family.

He graduated from the Krasnoyarsk Agricultural Institute with a degree in mechanical engineering.

He served in the Soviet Army.

From 1963 to 1971, he worked in the district committee of the Komsomol. In 1963, he received the certificate "Master of harvesting".

In March 1990, he was elected a People's Deputy of the Krasnoyarsk Regional Council.

During the 1991 August coup d'état attempt, Nedelin was a supporter of Boris Yeltsin. Having received the Decrees of the President of the RSFSR, he ordered to immediately transmit them on the district radio. He described the actions of the GKChP as preparations for the seizure of power in Russia.

On 12 December 1993, Nedelin was elected to the Federation Council from the Taimyr (Dolgano-Nenets) Autonomous Okrug. From 1996 to 2000, he was an ex officio member of the Federation Council. For a short time he was a member of the Committee on Federation Affairs, the Federal Treaty and Regional Policy, then a member of the Committee on the Affairs of the North and Indigenous Peoples.

On 22 December 1996, he was re-elected as the head of the district administration, receiving 64.4% of the vote. His main rival was the deputy of the district Duma, Gennady Subbotkin, for whom only 11.8% of voters voted.

From 1997 to 1998, he was a member of the Board of Directors of the Russian Joint Stock Company Norilsk Nickel.

On 28 October 2001, Nedelin had lost the elections already in the first round, gaining only 33.27% of the vote, to Alexander Khloponin, who had 63.1% of the votes.

He is married and has two children.
