= Anatoly Artamonov =

Russian politician (born 1952)

- Анатолий Артамонов
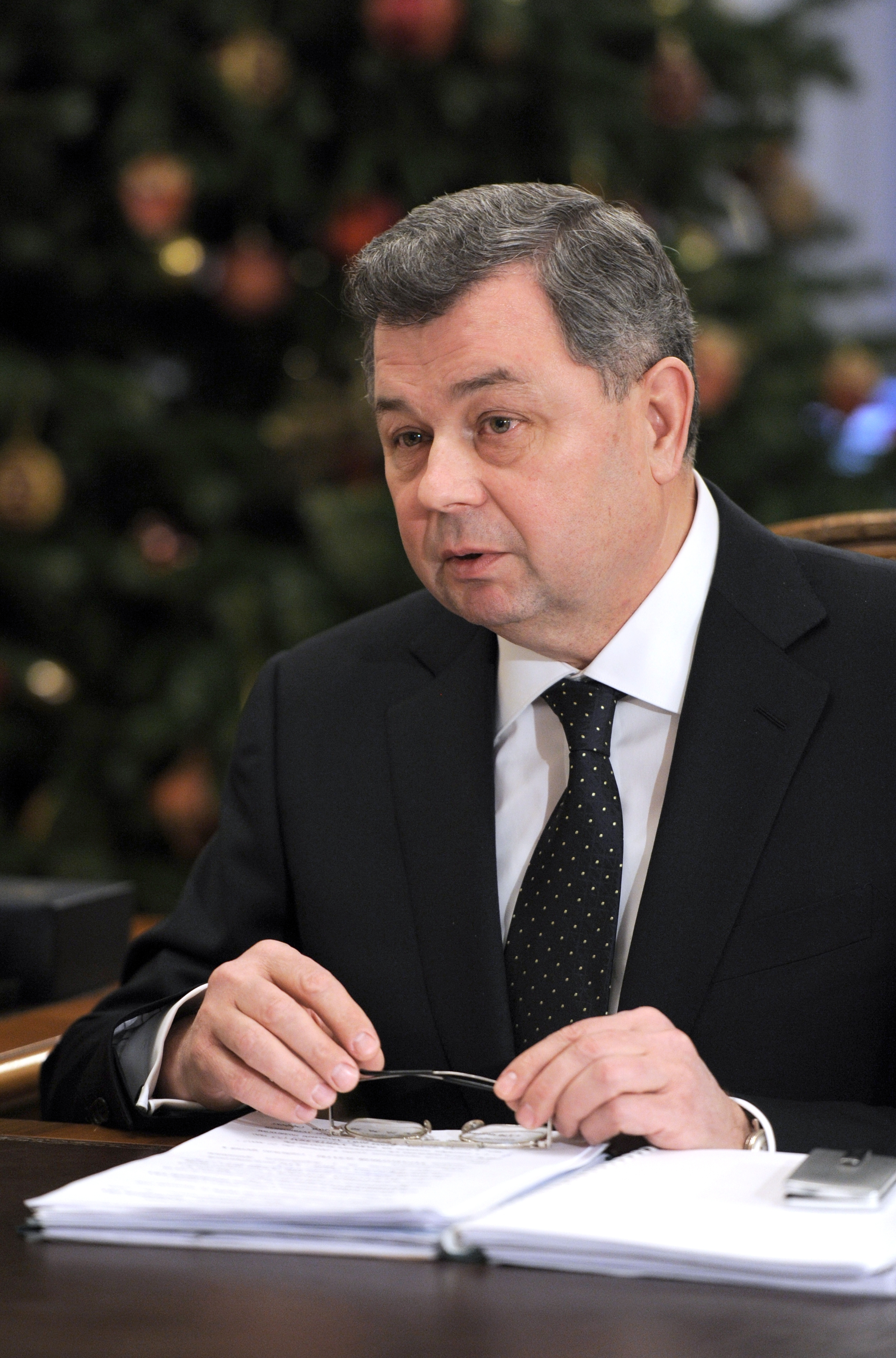
- Artamonov in 2012

Russian Federation Senator from Kaluga Oblast
- Incumbent
- Assumed office 14 February 2020
- Preceded by: Yury Volkov

4th Governor of Kaluga Oblast
- In office 12 November 2000 – 12 February 2020
- Preceded by: Valery Sudarenkov
- Succeeded by: Vladislav Shapsha

Personal details
- Born: 5 May 1952 (age 73) Krasnoye, Khvastovichsky District, Kaluga Oblast, RSFSR, USSR
- Party: United Russia
- Spouse: Zoya Iosifovna Artamonova

Anatoly Dmitriyevich Artamonov (Russian: Анато́лий Дми́триевич Артамо́нов; born 1952, in Krasnoye, Kaluga Oblast, USSR) is a Russian politician and former governor of Kaluga Oblast.

== Political career ==
In November 1996, Artamonov was elected vice-governor of Kaluga Oblast. On 12 November 2000, he was elected governor of Kaluga Oblast with 56.72% of the vote and was re-elected on 14 March 2004 with 66.86% of the vote. On 21 July 2005, President Vladimir Putin nominated him to continue in office; the Kaluga duma confirmed the nomination on 26 July.

In 2002, the Russian Biographical Institute named him Governor of the Year.

== Governance and economic policy ==
Artamonov is credited with promoting Kaluga Oblast as a destination for foreign investors, which led to the development of an automotive cluster in the region. He has also been praised for creating a pro-business environment and for redirecting the local economy away from Soviet-era military industries. During his tenure, he supported infrastructure development projects, including the reconstruction of Kaluga Airport.

== Public image and controversies ==
Artamonov has expressed admiration for former Singaporean Prime Minister Lee Kuan Yew.

In 2013, a Krasnoyarsk Krai court found him guilty of defamation after he referred to Russian oligarch Oleg Deripaska as “a crook”.

== Sanctions ==
He was sanctioned by the UK government in 2022 in relation to the Russo-Ukrainian War.
