= Oleg Savchenko (politician, born 1948) =

Russian politician

- Олег Савченко
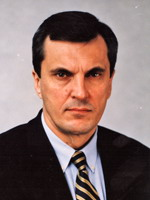

2nd Governor of Kaluga Oblast
- In office 7 March 1996 – 14 November 1996
- Preceded by: Aleksandr Deryargin; Viktor Pakhno (acting)
- Succeeded by: Valery Sudarenkov

Personal details
- Born: Oleg Vitalyevich Savchenko; 15 January 1948 (age 78) Kherson, Ukrainian SSR, Soviet Union
- Party: Our Home – Russia

Oleg Vitalyevich Savchenko (Russian: Олег Витальевич Савченко; born 15 January 1948), is a Ukrainian-born Russian politician and businessman who had served as the second Governor of Kaluga Oblast in 1996. According to the Forbes, Savchenko is the richest member of the Duma of Volgograd, having ranked 22nd in the list of the 100 state employees with the highest incomes of Russia in 2021.

== Biography ==
Oleg Savchenko was born on 15 January 1948.

He worked as a technician-operator of a computing center. In 1972, he graduated from the Faculty of Economics, at the Leningrad State University, then postgraduate studies at Moscow State University. He is a candidate of Economic Sciences, as an associate professor.

In 1972, he worked at the Institute of Atomic Energy in Obninsk. In 1990, he was elected a deputy of the Obninsk City Council, and then its chairman. In April 1990 he was elected a deputy of the Kaluga Regional Council.

Since September 1991, he had been the Representative of the President of Russia in the Kaluga Oblast. In December 1993, Savchenko ran for the Federation Council, but was not elected. Since March 1994, he had been a member of the Legislative Assembly of the Kaluga Oblast, and was the Chairman of the Committee for Integrated Development of the Region.

In December 1995, Savchenko ran for the State Duma of the second convocation, but was also not elected. On 7 March 1996, Savchenko was appointed the 2nd Governor of Kaluga Oblast. The title became governor as of 27 March. He was also a member of the Federation Council, and was a member of the Committee on Federation Affairs, the Federal Treaty and Regional Policy. In October 1996, Savchenko ran for governor of the region, but has lost the elections and left office on 14 November.

Savchenko had held the positions of General Director at SIK - CONCOR (design and construction), Trackpor - Technology (development and production of complex medical equipment), design and operation of the Park Yakhroma recreation and sports complex.

He had carried out corporate training and consulting in the field of innovation and strategic management, personnel management of large and medium-sized companies: Russian suppliers of Ikea, dealers of Volvo, Huntsman - Nmg, Russian Television and Radio Broadcasting Network, Norilsk Nickel Medbiopharm "," Ascona ", corporation" TVEL "and others.

He was the deputy director of the Swedish Institute of Management in Russia, and had been the head of the Department of Entrepreneurship and Management of the Franco-Russian Institute of Business Administration. Since 2010, he has been the rector of MIDA "FRIDAS", and director of the Obninsk branch of the State University of Management.

He is an author of a textbook in the field of innovation management.

== Family ==
Oleg Savchenko is married and has three children.
