= Ivan Rodin =

Russian footballer

Personal information
- Full name: Ivan Alekseyevich Rodin
- Date of birth: 14 April 1987 (age 39)
- Place of birth: Lyudinovo, Russian SFSR
- Height: 1.80 m (5 ft 11 in)
- Position: Midfielder

Team information
- Current team: FC Vityaz Podolsk

Youth career
- FC Spartak Moscow

Senior career*
Years	Team	Apps	(Gls)
2005–2008	Dinaburg FC	42	(2)
2009	FC Lokomotiv Kaluga (am.)		
2010–2014	FC Vityaz Podolsk	95	(24)
2012	→ FC Torpedo Moscow (loan)	24	(5)
2014	FC Kaluga	7	(1)
2014–2015	FC Tambov	20	(3)
2015–2016	FC Solyaris Moscow	25	(3)
2016–2017	FC Kaluga	39	(5)
2018–2019	FC Vityaz Podolsk (amateur)		
- * Club domestic league appearances and goals

Ivan Alekseyevich Rodin (Russian: Иван Алексеевич Родин; born 14 April 1987) is a Russian former professional football player.

== Club career ==
He played two seasons in the Russian Football National League for FC Torpedo Moscow.

He played for Dinaburg FC in the 2007 UEFA Intertoto Cup.
