= Vladislav Shapsha =

Russian politician and statesman

- Владислав Шапша
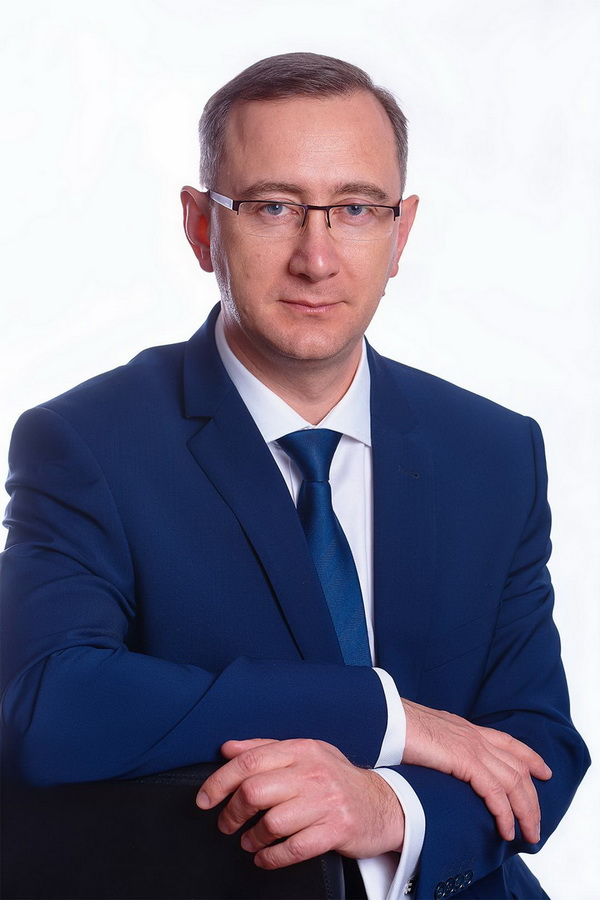
- Official portrait, 2020

5th Governor of Kaluga Oblast
- Incumbent
- Assumed office 16 September 2020
- Preceded by: Anatoly Artamonov

Governor of Kaluga Oblast (acting)
- In office 13 February 2020 – 16 September 2020

Head of Administration of Obninsk
- In office 27 October 2015 – 13 February 2020
- Preceded by: Aleksandr Avdeyev
- Succeeded by: Karina Bashkatova (acting)

Head of Administration of Obninsk (acting)
- In office 18 September 2015 – 27 October 2015

Personal details
- Born: Vladislav Valeryevich Shapsha; 20 September 1972 (age 54) Obninsk, Russian SFSR, Soviet Union
- Party: United Russia

Vladislav Valeryevich Shapsha (Russian: Владислав Валерьевич Шапша; born 20 September 1972) is a Russian statesman and politician who has been the 5th Governor of Kaluga Oblast since 16 September 2020.

Shapsha was previously the Head of the Obninsk Administration from 27 October 2015 to 13 February 2020.

== Biography ==
Vladislav Shapsha was born on 20 September 1972. In 1995, he graduated from the Obninsk Institute of Nuclear Power Engineering with a degree in Applied Mathematics, qualifying as an engineer-mathematician. In 1995, Shapsha was drafted into the Russian Armed Forces. He served in the Russian Navy, in the city of Severomorsk, as a reserve officer. After leaving the armed forces in 1997, he got a job at the Obninsk city employment center. He went from a specialist to a deputy director.

In 2002, Shapsha joined the Administration of the Governor of Kaluga Oblast as a consultant to the Deputy Governor. In 2003, he graduated with honors from the State University of Management with a degree in State and Municipal Management. For two years, from 2004 to 2006, he was the executive director of the Kaluga regional newspaper Znamya. In 2006, he began working in the administration of the city of Obninsk: as a business manager, and a deputy head. He worked as chairman and deputy chairman of the Territorial Election Commission of Obninsk.

On 18 September 2015, Shapsha headed the administration of the city of Obninsk as an interim, and then, on 27 October, was elected to this position by the deputies of the Obninsk City Assembly (29 out of 30 deputies cast their votes in his support. He is a member of the political council of the Obninsk local branch of the United Russia party as secretary.

In 2018, Shapsha took part in blogger Ilya Varlamov's show "BDSM" ("Big Road With the Mayor"), where he had to walk along Obninsk along an arbitrary route, answering uncomfortable questions from the presenter without preparation.

On 13 February 2020, Shapsha became the acting Governor of Kaluga Oblast after Anatoly Artamonov's resignation. Artamonov had led the region for almost 20 years. On 13 September 2020, during the 2020 Russian regional elections, Shapsha won the elections for the governor of Kaluga Oblast, gaining 71.19% of the vote, with a turnout of 35.36%. On 16 September 2020, he took office as the governor of the region. On 21 December 2020, by decree of the President of Russia, he was included in the State Council of the country.

=== Sanctions ===
He was sanctioned by the UK government in 2022 in relation to the Russo-Ukrainian War.

== Family ==
Shapsha is married, and has a child.
