= Valery Sudarenkov =

Soviet and Russian politician (born 1940)

- Валерий Сударенков
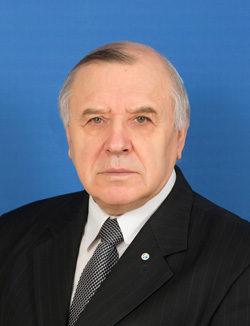

3rd Governor of Kaluga Oblast
- In office 9 November 1996 – 18 November 2000
- Preceded by: Oleg Savchenko
- Succeeded by: Anatoly Artamonov

Personal details
- Born: 13 June 1940 (age 85) Nizhniye Gorki, Maloyaroslavetsky District, Kaluga Oblast, RSFSR, USSR
- Party: Communist Party of the Soviet Union (before 1991)
- Spouse: Zoya Nikolayevna Sudarenkova
- Children: 2

Valery Vasilyevich Sudarenkov (Russian: Вале́рий Васи́льевич Сударенков; born June 13, 1940) is a Soviet party and Russian politician, former 1st secretary of the Kaluga Regional Committee of the Communist Party, the former governor of the Kaluga Region and a representative of Kaluga Oblast in the Federation Council.

== Biography ==
=== Education and labor activity ===
Born June 13, 1940, in the village of Nizhniye Gorki Maloyaroslavetsky District of Kaluga Region in the family of the soldier and the rural teacher. Russian by nationality.

He graduated from the Railway Technical School, Kaluga Branch of Bauman Moscow State Technical University in 1969, correspondence Higher Party School of the Central Committee in 1979. It has been serving in the Navy (Pacific Fleet, 1959–1963).

Since 1964 — a technician, senior technician Kaluga Turbine Works, since 1965 Engineer, Senior Engineer, Head Office, deputy head of department, head of an experienced motor factory shop (Kaluga).

=== Political activity ===
Since 1980 — head of the department of defense industry of the Kaluga Regional Party Committee.

From 1984 to 1986 — first secretary of the Party Committee of Kaluga. From 1986 to 1990 - Deputy Chairman of the Council of Ministers of the Uzbek SSR.

From 1990 to 1991 Sudarenkov — the first secretary of the Kaluga Regional Committee of the CPSU. It was in the CPSU Central Committee from July 1990 to August 1991. On the eve of the events of August 1991, he resigned from the post of first secretary of the regional committee.

From April 1990 to December 1993 — Chairman of the Kaluga Regional Council of People's Deputies.

In December 1993 he was elected a member of the Federation Council, he was chairman of the Committee on Science, Culture, Education, Health and Ecology.

In April 1994 he was elected deputy and chairman of the Legislative Assembly of Kaluga Region. In November 1996 he was elected head of the Kaluga region with the support of the People's Patriotic Union of Russia administration. In the post belonged to the Federation Council, he headed the Committee for Science, Culture, Education, Health and Ecology. In the next gubernatorial election in the Kaluga Region, the past 12 November 2000, did not participate.

After retiring from the post of governor he was delegated to the Federation Council as a representative of the executive power of the region. He was a member of the State Expert Council under the Russian President on a particularly valuable objects of the cultural heritage of the peoples of the Russian Federation and a member of the Government Commission on the implementation of the national policy framework.
