= Legislative Assembly of Kaluga Oblast =

Regional parliament of Kaluga Oblast, Russia

Legislative Assembly of Kaluga Oblast Законодательное собрание Калужской области
- 8th legislature

Type
- Type: Unicameral

Leadership
- Chairman: Gennady Novoseltsev, United Russia since 24 September 2020

Structure
- Seats: 40
- Political groups: United Russia (33) CPRF (2); LDPR (2); New People (1); SRZP (1) RPPSJ (1)

Elections
- Voting system: Mixed
- Last election: 12-14 September 2025
- Next election: 2030

Meeting place
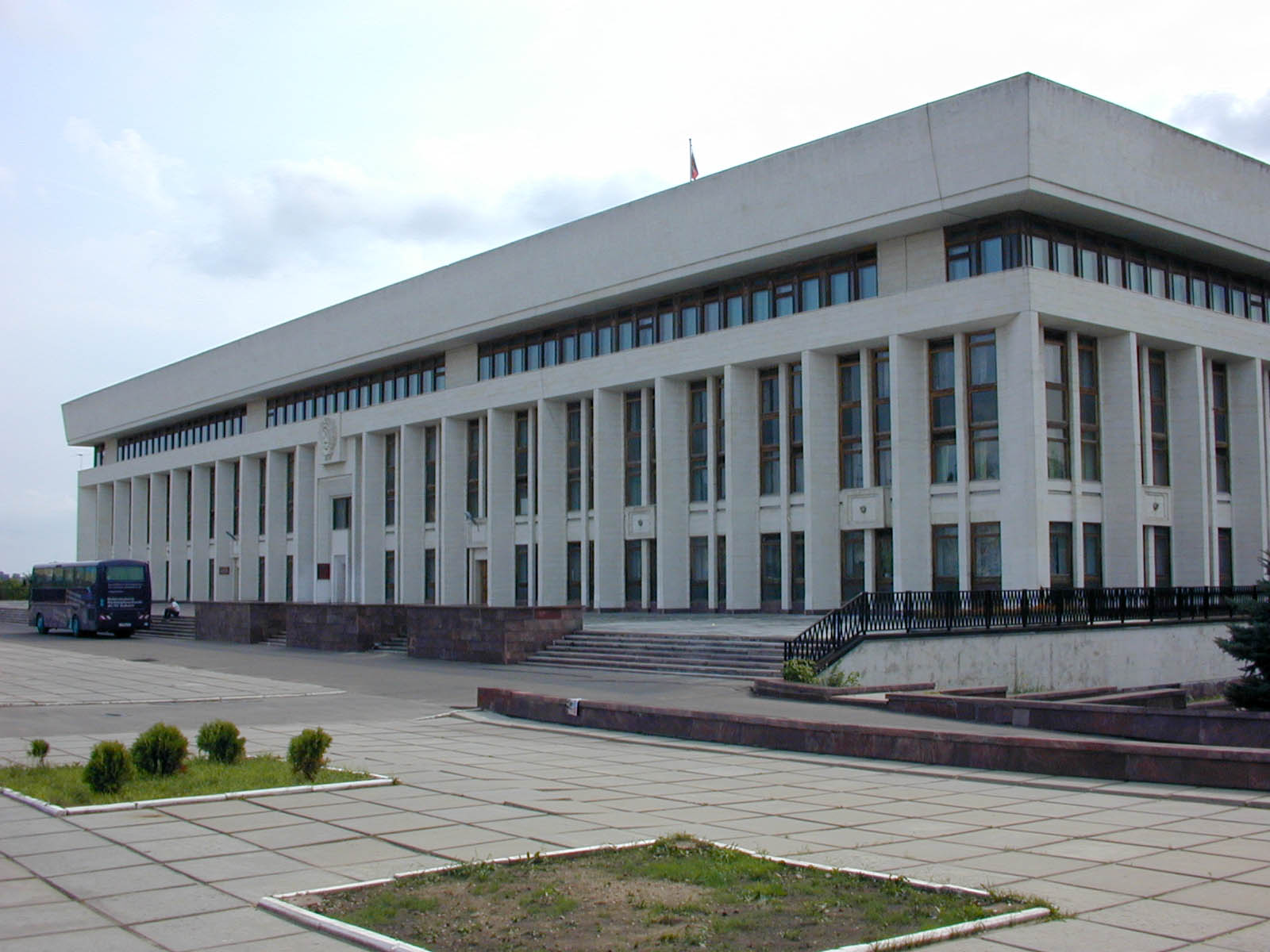

Website
- zskaluga.ru

The Legislative Assembly of Kaluga Oblast (Russian: Законодательное собрание Калужской области, romanized: Zakonodatel'noye sobraniye Kaluzhskoy oblasti) is the regional parliament of Kaluga Oblast, a federal subject of Russia. A total of 40 deputies are elected for five-year terms.

== Elections ==
=== 2020 ===
Party	%	Seats
United Russia	42.43	29
Communist Party of the Russian Federation	12.90	3
Liberal Democratic Party of Russia	8.60	2
New People	8.08	2
A Just Russia	8.01	3
Russian Party of Pensioners for Social Justice	7.84	1
Registered voters/turnout	35.36	

=== 2025 ===
Party	%	Seats
United Russia	58.56	33
Liberal Democratic Party of Russia	9.53	2
Communist Party of the Russian Federation	9.48	2
A Just Russia	7.88	1
Russian Party of Pensioners for Social Justice	5.71	1
New People	5.46	1
Invalid ballots	3.39	
Registered voters/turnout	44.41	
