= 2023 Magadan Oblast gubernatorial election =

- 8–10 September 2023
- Turnout: 35.01%
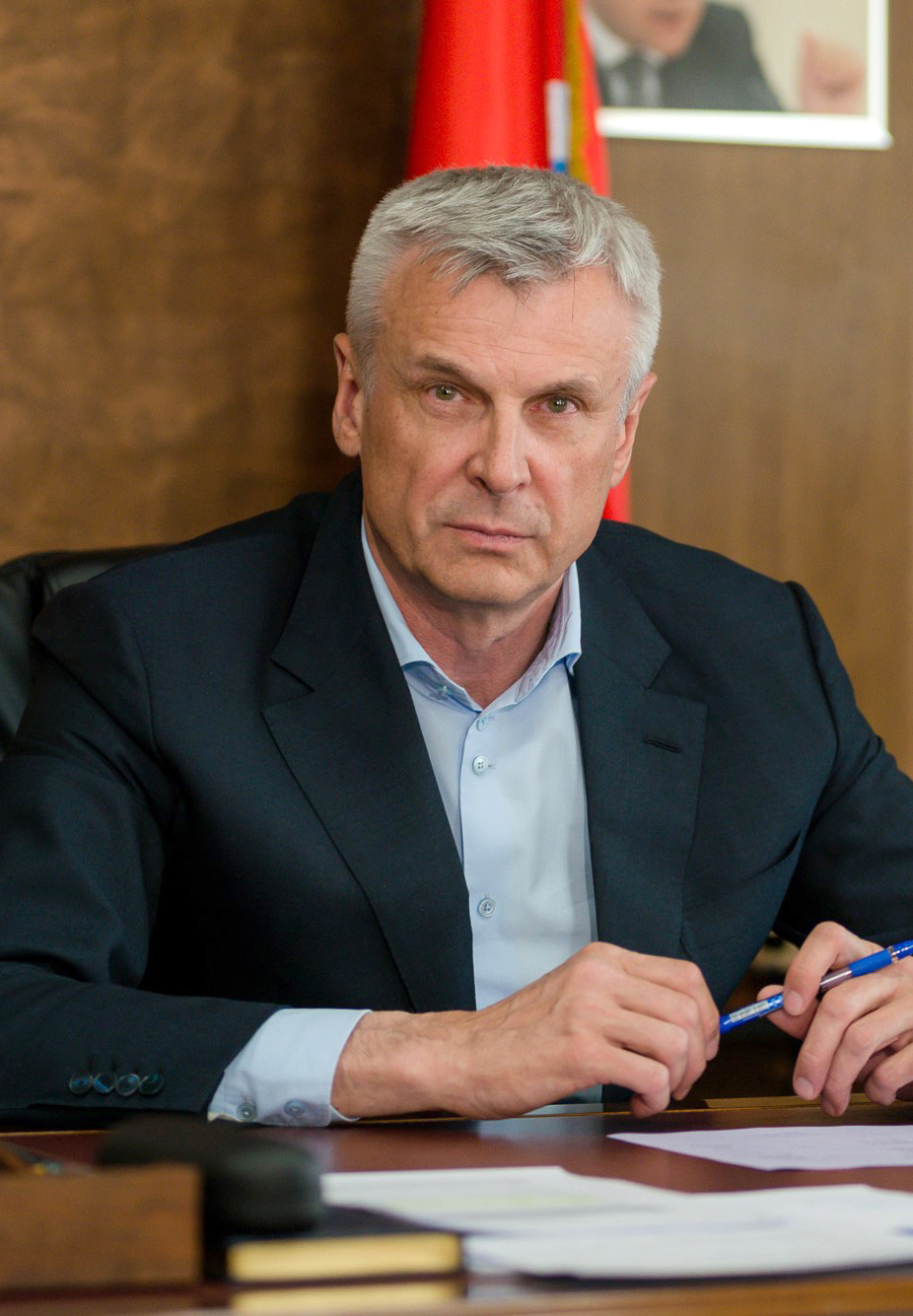
		CPRF
Candidate	Sergey Nosov	Sergey Goncharenko
Party	United Russia	CPRF
Popular vote	24,508	3,602
Percentage	72.51%	10.66%
	LDPR	SR-ZP
Candidate	Roman Isayev	Oleg Prikoki
Party	LDPR	A Just Russia
Popular vote	2,933	1,951
Percentage	8.68%	5.77%
- Results by administrative division
Governor before election
Sergey Nosov
United Russia
Elected Governor
Sergey Nosov
United Russia

The 2023 Magadan Oblast gubernatorial election took place on 8–10 September 2023, on common election day. Incumbent Governor Sergey Nosov was re-elected to a second term in office.

== Background ==
Nizhny Tagil Mayor Sergey Nosov was appointed acting Governor of Magadan Oblast in May 2018 to replace retiring one-term governor Vladimir Pechyony. Nosov had never visited Magadan Oblast prior to his appointment and was actually rumoured to be potential candidate for Governor of Sverdlovsk Oblast. Nosov won an election for a full term in September 2018 with 81.5% of the vote – the highest margin in Magadan Oblast's history.

On June 6, 2023 President Vladimir Putin in a meeting with Sergey Nosov endorsed the incumbent for a second gubernatorial term.

== Candidates ==
In Magadan Oblast candidates for Governor can be nominated only by registered political parties, self-nomination is not possible. However, candidates are not obliged to be members of the nominating party. Candidate for Governor of Magadan Oblast should be a Russian citizen and at least 30 years old. Candidates for Governor should not have a foreign citizenship or residence permit. Each candidate in order to be registered is required to collect at least 10% of signatures of members and heads of municipalities. Also gubernatorial candidates present 3 candidacies to the Federation Council and election winner later appoints one of the presented candidates.

=== Registered ===
- Sergey Goncharenko (CPRF), Member of Magadan Oblast Duma (2020–present)
- Roman Isayev (LDPR), Member of Magadan Oblast Duma (2020–present), aide to State Duma member Valery Seleznev, 2018 gubernatorial candidate
- Sergey Nosov (United Russia), incumbent Governor of Magadan Oblast (2018–present)
- Oleg Prikoki (SR–ZP), marine researcher

=== Declined ===
- Roza Chemeris (New People), Member of State Duma (2021–present), 2018 Primorsky Krai For Women of Russia gubernatorial candidate

=== Candidates for Federation Council ===
- Sergey Goncharenko (CPRF):
  - Marina Lisovtsova, entrepreneur
  - Tatyana Shakhurdina, CPRF regional office clerk
  - Inga Yegorova, attorney
- Roman Isayev (LDPR): (Note: in fact, all filed candidates are ineligible due to age restrictions)
  - Anton Goncharenko, cashier
  - Tatyana Kravtsova, unemployed
  - Rodion Simonenko, purchase specialist
- Sergey Nosov (United Russia):
  - Murat Galoyev, director of Magadan Mechanical Plant
  - Anatoly Shirokov, incumbent Senator (2014–present)
  - Natalya Tverdokhlebova, public initiatives consultant
- Oleg Prikoki (SR–ZP):
  - Igor Novikov, Member of Magadan Oblast Duma (2005–present)
  - Yelena Pavlovskaya, pensioner
  - Eduard Prikhodko, Member of Magadan City Duma (2005–2010, 2020–present), 2018 gubernatorial candidate

== Results ==
Summary of the 8–10 September 2023 Magadan Oblast gubernatorial election results
Candidate	Party	Votes	%
Sergey Nosov (incumbent)	United Russia	24,508	72.51
Sergey Goncharenko	Communist Party	3,602	10.66
Roman Isayev	Liberal Democratic Party	2,933	8.68
Oleg Prikoki	A Just Russia — For Truth	1,951	5.77
Valid votes		32,994	97.62
Blank ballots		805	2.38
Total		33,799	100.00
Turnout		33,799	35.01
Registered voters		96,536	100.00

Governor Nosov re-appointed incumbent Senator Anatoly Shirokov to the Federation Council.

== See also ==
- 2023 Russian regional elections
