= 2025 Magadan Oblast legislative election =

Regional legislative election in Russia

← 2020	12–14 September 2025	2030 →

All 21 seats in the Oblast Duma 11 seats needed for a majority
- Turnout: 41.64% ▲8.47 pp
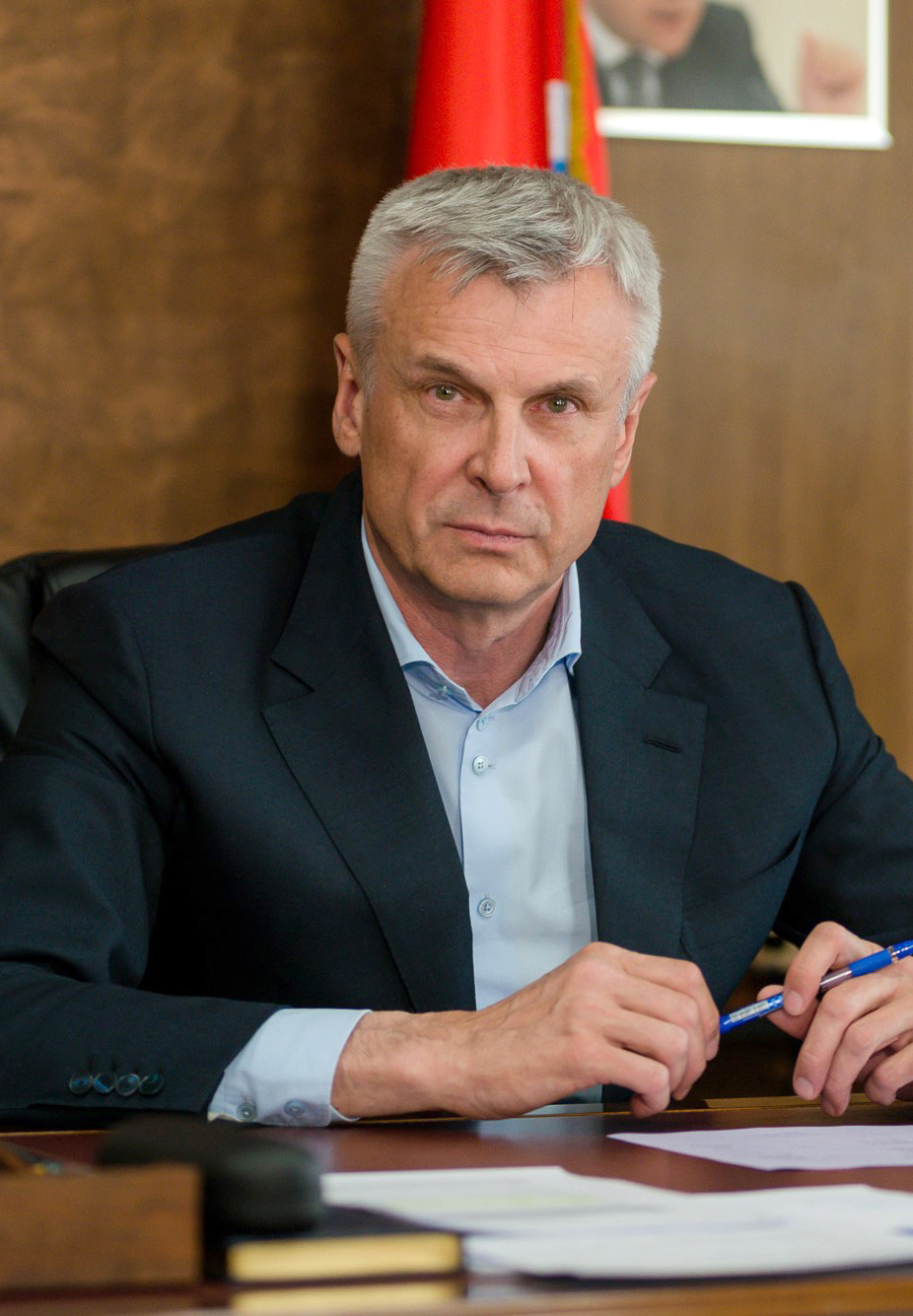

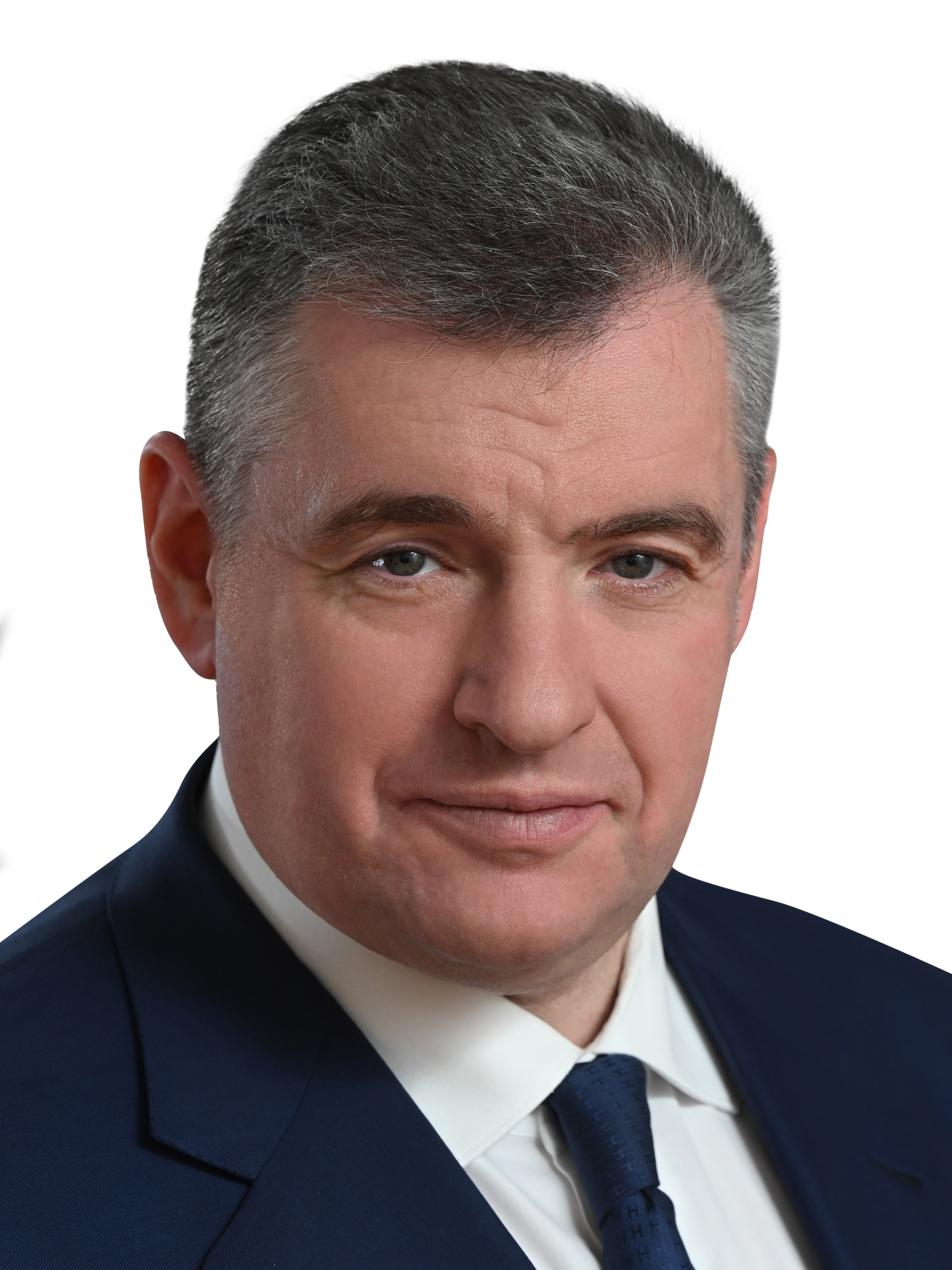
	Majority party	Minority party	Third party
			CPRF
Candidate	Sergey Nosov	Leonid Slutsky	Sergey Goncharenko
Party	United Russia	LDPR	CPRF
Last election	58.32%, 16 seats	11.61%, 2 seats	10.31%, 1 seat
Seats won	17	1	1
Seat change	▲1	▼1	Steady
Popular vote	26,446	5,148	3,371
Percentage	65.89%	12.83%	8.40%
Swing	▲7.57 pp	▲1.22 pp	▼1.91 pp
	Fourth party	Fifth party
	SR–ZP	NL
Candidate	Igor Novikov	Kirill Ettenko
Party	SR–ZP	New People
Last election	7.25%, 2 seats	Did not participate
Seats won	1	1
Seat change	▼1	Did not participate
Popular vote	2,095	2,033
Percentage	5.22%	5.07%
Swing	▼2.03 pp	Did not participate
Chairman before election
Sergey Abramov
United Russia
Elected Chairman
Anatoly Shirokov
United Russia

The 2025 Magadan Oblast Duma election took place on 12–14 September 2025, on common election day. All 21 seats in the Oblast Duma were up for re-election.

United Russia increased its already overwhelming majority in the Oblast Duma, winning 65.9% of the vote and all 10 single-mandate constituencies, regaining one seat from A Just Russia – For Truth. Liberal Democratic Party of Russia lost one of its two deputies as New People entered the Oblast Duma for the first time, narrowly crossing the 5% threshold.

== Electoral system ==
Under current election laws, the Oblast Duma is elected for a term of five years, with parallel voting. 11 seats are elected by party-list proportional representation with a 5% electoral threshold, with the other half elected in 10 single-member constituencies by first-past-the-post voting. Seats in the proportional part are allocated using the Imperiali quota, modified to ensure that every party list, which passes the threshold, receives at least one mandate.

== Candidates ==
=== Party lists ===
To register regional lists of candidates, parties need to collect 0.5% of signatures of all registered voters in Magadan Oblast.

The following parties were relieved from the necessity to collect signatures:

- United Russia
- Communist Party of the Russian Federation
- Liberal Democratic Party of Russia
- A Just Russia — Patriots — For Truth
- New People
- Russian Party of Pensioners for Social Justice

№	Party	Oblast-wide list	Candidates	Territorial groups	Status
1	Communist Party	Sergey Goncharenko • ~~Igor Dadashev~~ • Marina Lisovtsova	25	6	Registered
2	New People	Kirill Ettenko	29	6	Registered
3	Liberal Democratic Party	Leonid Slutsky • Roman Isayev • Sergey Plotnikov	30	9	Registered
4	United Russia	Sergey Nosov • Aleksandr Basansky • Sergey Abramov	58	10	Registered
5	A Just Russia – For Truth	Igor Novikov • Oleg Prikoki	29	10	Registered

New People will take part in Komi legislative election for the first time. Russian Party of Pensioners for Social Justice and Russian Party of Freedom and Justice, which participated in the last election, did not file, while For Truth has been dissolved since.

=== Single-mandate constituencies ===
10 single-mandate constituencies were formed in Magadan Oblast. To register candidates in single-mandate constituencies need to collect 3% of signatures of registered voters in the constituency.

Number of candidates in single-mandate constituencies
Party	Candidates	
Party	Nominated	Registered
United Russia	10	10
Liberal Democratic Party	10	10
Communist Party	7	7
A Just Russia – For Truth	10	10
Total	37	37

== Results ==
=== Results by party lists ===
Summary of the 12–14 September 2025 Magadan Oblast Duma election results
Party	Party list					Constituency		Total	
Party	Votes	%	±pp	Seats	+/–	Seats	+/–	Seats	+/–
United Russia	26,446	65.89	▲7.57	7	Steady	10	▲1	17	▲1
Liberal Democratic Party	5,148	12.83	▲1.22	1	▼1	0	Steady	1	▼1
Communist Party	3,371	8.40	▼1.91	1	Steady	0	Steady	1	Steady
A Just Russia — For Truth	2,095	5.22	▼2.03	1	Steady	0	▼1	1	▼1
New People	2,033	5.07	New	1	New	–	–	1	New
Invalid ballots	1,043	2.60	▼1.56	—	—	—	—	—	—
Total	40,136	100.00	—	11	Steady	10	Steady	21	Steady
Turnout	40,136	41.64	▲8.47	—	—	—	—	—	—
Registered voters	96,382	100.00	—	—	—	—	—	—	—

Senator Anatoly Shirokov (United Russia) was elected new Chairman of the Oblast Duma, replacing Sergey Abramov (United Russia), who actually gave his mandate to Shirokov. Incumbent Senator Sergey Ivanov (United Russia) was re-appointed to the Federation Council.

=== Results in single-member constituencies ===
==== District 1 ====
Summary of the 12–14 September 2025 Magadan Oblast Duma election in District 1
Candidate	Party	Votes	%
Pyotr Golubovsky (incumbent)	United Russia	1,263	47.04%
Roman Isayev	Liberal Democratic Party	578	21.53%
Aleksandr Kislitsyn	Communist Party	404	15.05%
Yegor Yegorov	A Just Russia – For Truth	294	10.95%
Total		2,685	100%

==== District 2 ====
Summary of the 12–14 September 2025 Magadan Oblast Duma election in District 2
Candidate	Party	Votes	%
Aleksandr Nesterovich (incumbent)	United Russia	1,171	47.33%
Sergey Matveyev	Liberal Democratic Party	421	17.02%
Oleg Prikoki	A Just Russia – For Truth	396	16.01%
Eduard Dorozhko	Communist Party	370	14.96%
Total		2,474	100%

==== District 3 ====
Summary of the 12–14 September 2025 Magadan Oblast Duma election in District 3
Candidate	Party	Votes	%
Maksim Malakhov	United Russia	1,049	38.97%
Anzhela Burdukovskaya	Liberal Democratic Party	622	23.11%
Aleksey Golovan (incumbent)	A Just Russia – For Truth	516	19.17%
Aleksandr Shishkin	Communist Party	335	12.44%
Total		2,692	100%

==== District 4 ====
Summary of the 12–14 September 2025 Magadan Oblast Duma election in District 4
Candidate	Party	Votes	%
Igor Rozinov (incumbent)	United Russia	1,499	51.32%
Andrey Mayorov	Liberal Democratic Party	566	19.38%
Andrey Yemeltsev	Communist Party	367	12.56%
Aleksandr Kasapchuk	A Just Russia – For Truth	334	11.43%
Total		2,921	100%

==== District 5 ====
Summary of the 12–14 September 2025 Magadan Oblast Duma election in District 5
Candidate	Party	Votes	%
Eduard Kozlov (incumbent)	United Russia	1,462	54.65%
Olesya Savitskaya	A Just Russia – For Truth	419	15.66%
Ksenia Lozenko	Liberal Democratic Party	338	12.64%
Vera Markova	Communist Party	266	9.94%
Total		2,675	100%

==== District 6 ====
Summary of the 12–14 September 2025 Magadan Oblast Duma election in District 6
Candidate	Party	Votes	%
Vladimir Milotvorsky (incumbent)	United Russia	1,412	53.59%
Aleksey Paravayev	Liberal Democratic Party	385	14.61%
Mikhail Bazderov	Communist Party	365	13.85%
Roman Korobkov	A Just Russia – For Truth	350	13.28%
Total		2,635	100%

==== District 7 ====
Summary of the 12–14 September 2025 Magadan Oblast Duma election in District 7
Candidate	Party	Votes	%
Yevgeny Saltanov (incumbent)	United Russia	1,998	57.68%
Rodion Simonenko	Liberal Democratic Party	753	21.74%
Andrey Feofanov	A Just Russia – For Truth	462	13.34%
Total		3,464	100%

==== District 8 ====
Summary of the 12–14 September 2025 Magadan Oblast Duma election in District 8
Candidate	Party	Votes	%
Aleksandr Basansky (incumbent)	United Russia	5,410	88.31%
Sofya Valek	Liberal Democratic Party	279	4.55%
Vladimir Valuyskov	Communist Party	178	2.91%
Valentina Stepanova	A Just Russia – For Truth	148	2.42%
Total		6,126	100%

==== District 9 ====
Summary of the 12–14 September 2025 Magadan Oblast Duma election in District 9
Candidate	Party	Votes	%
Igor Dontsov (incumbent)	United Russia	3,810	75.28%
Natalya Driven	Liberal Democratic Party	763	15.08%
Vasily Knyazev	A Just Russia – For Truth	285	5.63%
Total		5,061	100%

==== District 10 ====
Summary of the 12–14 September 2025 Magadan Oblast Duma election in District 10
Candidate	Party	Votes	%
Stanislav Prutskov	United Russia	3,436	76.80%
Yury Yefimchuk	Liberal Democratic Party	566	12.65%
Yevgeny Kononov	A Just Russia – For Truth	360	8.05%
Total		4,474	100%

=== Members ===
Incumbent deputies are highlighted with bold, elected members who declined to take a seat are marked with ~~strikethrough~~.

Constituency
No.	Member	Party
1	Pyotr Golubovsky	United Russia
2	Aleksandr Nesterovich	United Russia
3	Maksim Malakhov	United Russia
4	Igor Rozinov	United Russia
5	Eduard Kozlov	United Russia
6	Vladimir Milotvorsky	United Russia
7	Yevgeny Saltanov	United Russia
8	Aleksandr Basansky	United Russia
9	Igor Dontsov	United Russia
10	Stanislav Prutskov	United Russia

Party lists
Member	Party
~~Sergey Nosov~~	United Russia
~~Sergey Abramov~~	United Russia
~~Roman Lovrikov~~	United Russia
~~Ruslan Fedorchuk~~	United Russia
~~Marina Vyatkina~~	United Russia
~~Irina Ryazantseva~~	United Russia
~~Lilia Shcherbakova~~	United Russia
~~Irina Smirnova~~	United Russia
~~Daniil Somov~~	United Russia
~~Ilya Ivanovsky~~	United Russia
~~Yana Starodubets~~	United Russia
~~Marina Sirazetdinova~~	United Russia
Anatoly Shirokov	United Russia
~~Pyotr Burmistrov~~	United Russia
~~Daniil Kraskovsky~~	United Russia
~~Ruslan Kastoyev~~	United Russia
~~Yulia Rotko~~	United Russia
~~Anton Merkulov~~	United Russia
~~Nikolay Rovnov~~	United Russia
Dmitry Shapovalov	United Russia
~~Pyotr Tsvetkov~~	United Russia
Viktoria Golubeva	United Russia
Andrey Aksanov	United Russia
Sergey Ivanov	United Russia
Andrey Zykov	United Russia
Sergey Khristov	United Russia
~~Leonid Slutsky~~	Liberal Democratic Party
Roman Isayev	Liberal Democratic Party
Sergey Goncharenko	Communist Party
Igor Novikov	A Just Russia – For Truth
Kirill Ettenko	New People

== See also ==
- 2025 Russian regional elections
