= Nikolay Dudov =

Russian politician

- Николай Дудов
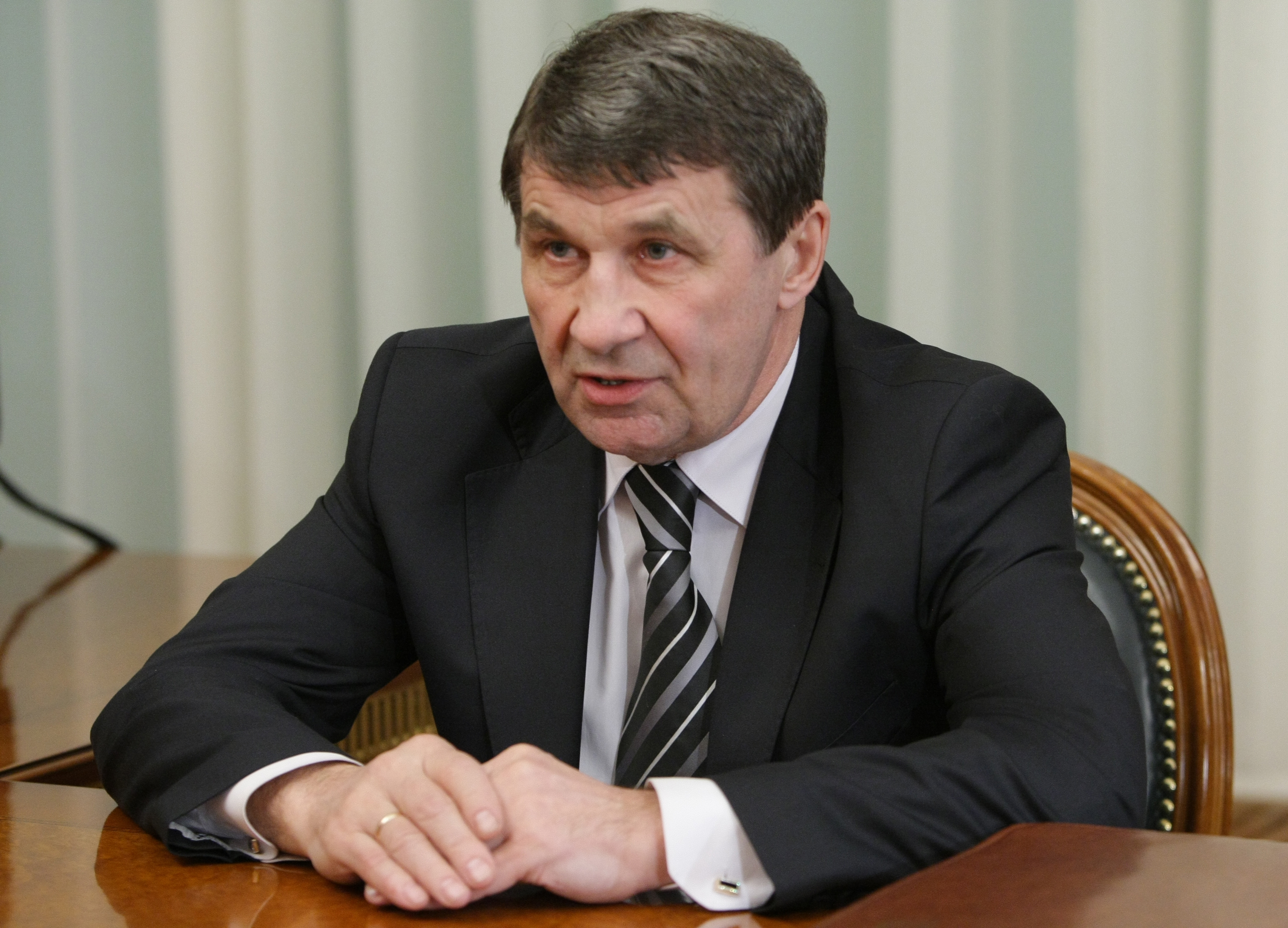
- Dudov in 2011

3rd Governor of Magadan Oblast
- In office 28 February 2003 – 3 February 2013
- Preceded by: Valentin Tsvetkov
- Succeeded by: Vladimir Pechyony

Personal details
- Born: January 1, 1952 (age 73); Severo-Zadonsk, Moscow Oblast, RSFSR, Soviet Union (now Donskoy, Tula Oblast, Russia)
- Political party: United Russia
- Children: 2 daughters
- Education: Novomoskovsk institute of the University of Chemical Technology

Nikolay Nikolayevich Dudov (Russian: Николай Николаевич Дудов, born 1 January 1952) is a Russian politician who was the Governor of Magadan Oblast of Russia from 2003 to 2013.

== Biography ==
Nikolay Dudov was born on 1 January 1952 in the town of Severo-Zadonsk (now part of Donskoy, Tula Oblast). Since 1969 he has been a locksmith at a condenser plant. In 1970-1972 he served in the Soviet Army, reaching the rank of senior sergeant. Dudov continued to work as a mechanic at the plant to 1978, when he moved to Chukotka. There he worked as a senior electrician on duty, and then as a shift supervisor at the Chukotka CHPP. Since 1982 — instructor, then head of the organizational department of the Communist Party local branch. In 1986 he went to work in the Magadan Oblast party committee.

Since 1996, he worked as an assistant, then chief adviser to governor Valentin Tsvetkov. Since November 2000 Dudov was deputy governor, and then first deputy governor of Magadan Oblast, and Tsvetkov's chief of staff. After the assassination of Tsvetkov in October 2002, Dudov was acting governor. On 16 February 2003, he was elected Governor of Magadan Oblast, overtaking mayor of Magadan Nikolay Karpenko, who was endorsed by United Russia party. Dudov took office on February 28. In February 2008 Dudov was appointed for a new term by Magadan Oblast Duma. In February 2013 he was succeeded by Vladimir Pechyony.

== Awards ==
- Order "For Merit to the Fatherland", 4th class (25 July 2013) — for achieved labor successes and many years of diligent work.
- Order of Honour (14 November 2005) — for significant contribution to the socio-economic development of the region and many years of conscientious work.
- Certificate of Honor of the Government of the Russian Federation (1 January 2007) — for personal contribution to the socio-economic development of Magadan Oblast and many years of diligent service.
- Order of Saint Blessed Prince Daniel of Moscow, 2nd class (Russian Orthodox Church, 2011) — in recognition of assistance in the construction of the cathedral.

== Family ==
In 1973, he married. His wife, Lyudmila Mikhailovna, is trained as a commodity expert. They have two daughters — Natalia and Ekaterina.
