= Governor of Magadan Oblast =

Highest-ranking official in Magadan Oblast, Russia

- Coat of arms of Magadan Oblast

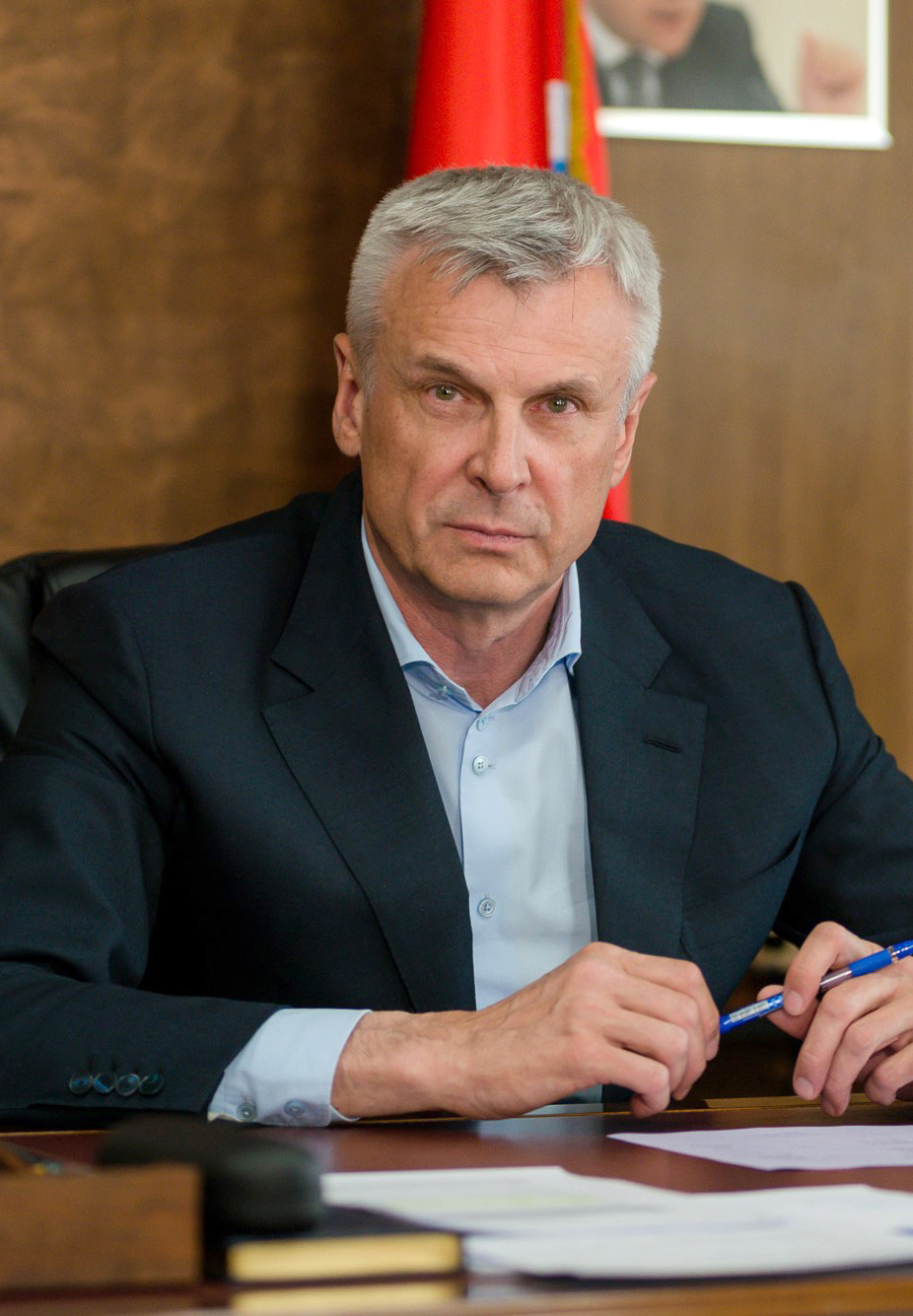
- Incumbent; Sergey Nosov since 13 September 2018
- Status: Head of Federal Subject
- Seat: Magadan
- Nominator: Political parties
- Appointer: Direct popular vote
- Term length: five years, one consecutive re-election
- Constituting instrument: Charter of Magadan Oblast
- Formation: 1991
- Website: 49gov.ru

The Governor of Magadan Oblast (Russian: Губернатор Магаданской области is the head of that federal subject of Russia. Governor is elected by the people of Magadan Oblast for five years.

The current governor is Sergey Nosov.

== List ==
No.	Image	Governor	Tenure	Time in office	Party	Election
1		Viktor Mikhailov (1936–2023)	24 October 1991 – 15 November 1996 (lost election)	5 years, 22 days	Independent	Appointed
2		Valentin Tsvetkov (1948–2002)	15 November 1996 – 18 October 2002 (died in office)	5 years, 337 days	Independent	1996; 2000
—		Nikolay Dudov (born 1952)	18 October 2002 – 28 February 2003	10 years, 108 days	Independent	Acting
3		Nikolay Dudov (born 1952)	28 February 2003 – 3 February 2013 (term end)	10 years, 108 days	United Russia	2003; 2008
—		Vladimir Pechyony (born 1949)	3 February 2013 – 18 September 2013	5 years, 114 days	United Russia	Acting
4		Vladimir Pechyony (born 1949)	18 September 2013 – 28 May 2018 (resigned)	5 years, 114 days	United Russia	2013
—		Sergey Nosov (born 1961)	28 May 2018 – 13 September 2018	8 years, 102 days	United Russia	Acting
5		Sergey Nosov (born 1961)	13 September 2018 – present	8 years, 102 days	United Russia	2018; 2023
