= Valentin Tsvetkov =

Russian politician (1948–2002)

- Валентин Цветков
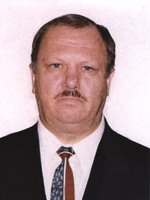

Governor of Magadan Oblast
- In office 15 November 1996 – 18 October 2002
- Preceded by: Viktor Mikhailov as Head of Administration
- Succeeded by: Nikolay Dudov

Member of the State Duma from Magadan constituency No. 103
- In office 17 December 1995 – 15 November 1996
- Preceded by: Yevgeny Kokorev
- Succeeded by: Vladimir Butkeyev

Personal details
- Born: Valentin Ivanovich Tsvetkov; August 27, 1948 Florești, Moldavian SSR
- Died: October 18, 2002 (aged 54) Moscow, Russia
- Education: Zaporizhzhia Machine Construction Institute
- Awards: Alt text

Valentin Ivanovich Tsvetkov (Russian: Валентин Иванович Цветков; 27 August 1948 – 18 October 2002) was a Russian politician who served as the governor of Magadan Oblast in the Russian Far East from 1996 until his assassination.

== Biography ==
Valentin Tsvetkov was born on 27 August 1948 in Florești. In 1974 he graduated from the Zaporozhye Machine Construction Institute. From 1974 to 1980 he was a foreman, then senior foreman, then head of the department of the Magadan repair and mechanical plant. 1980-83 - Deputy Director of the Magadan Woodworking Plant. 1983-86 - deputy director, then director (1986–94) of the Magadannerud enterprise. In 1990, the KGB opened a criminal case on industrial smuggling against the Spark JV, whose director was Tsvetkov. On 17 April 1991, the case was dropped "for lack of corpus delicti."

On 12 December 1993 he was elected to the first Federation Council. On 17 December 1995, he was elected to the State Duma in Magadan constituency. In May 1997, Tsvetkov's mandate in the by-election was won by Vladimir Butkeyev.

On 3 November 1996, Tsvetkov was elected Governor of the Magadan Region. In January 1997, he became ex officio member of the second Federation Council.

== Death ==
On 18 October 2002, Tsvetkov was shot dead near the Magadan Oblast representative office on New Arbat Avenue in Moscow. The killer who was waiting at the building shot Tsvetkov in the head. The main version of the assassination is connected with the distribution of fishing quotas in the region and attempts by organized criminal groups (including ethnic ones) to weaken government control of Magadan Oblast gold mines.

=== Perpetrators ===
The suspects in the murder were Russian citizens Alexander Zakharov and Martin Babakekhyan. They were arrested on 7 July 2006 in the Spanish resort of Marbella. On 18 August 2007 Spain extradited Zakharov to Russia. Babakekhyan was extradited five months later. In 2011, the jury found that the guilt of Martin Babakekhyan, Artur Anisimov, Alexander Zakharov and Masis Akhunts in involvement in the murder was proven.

== Awards ==
- Order of Honour (29 July 1998) — "for a great personal contribution to the socio-economic development of the region and many years of conscientious work."
- Order "For Merit to the Fatherland" 4th class (7 May 2001) — "for a great contribution to the strengthening of Russian statehood and the implementation of economic reforms."
