= Vladimir Pechyony =

Ukrainian-born Russian statesman

- Владимир Печёный
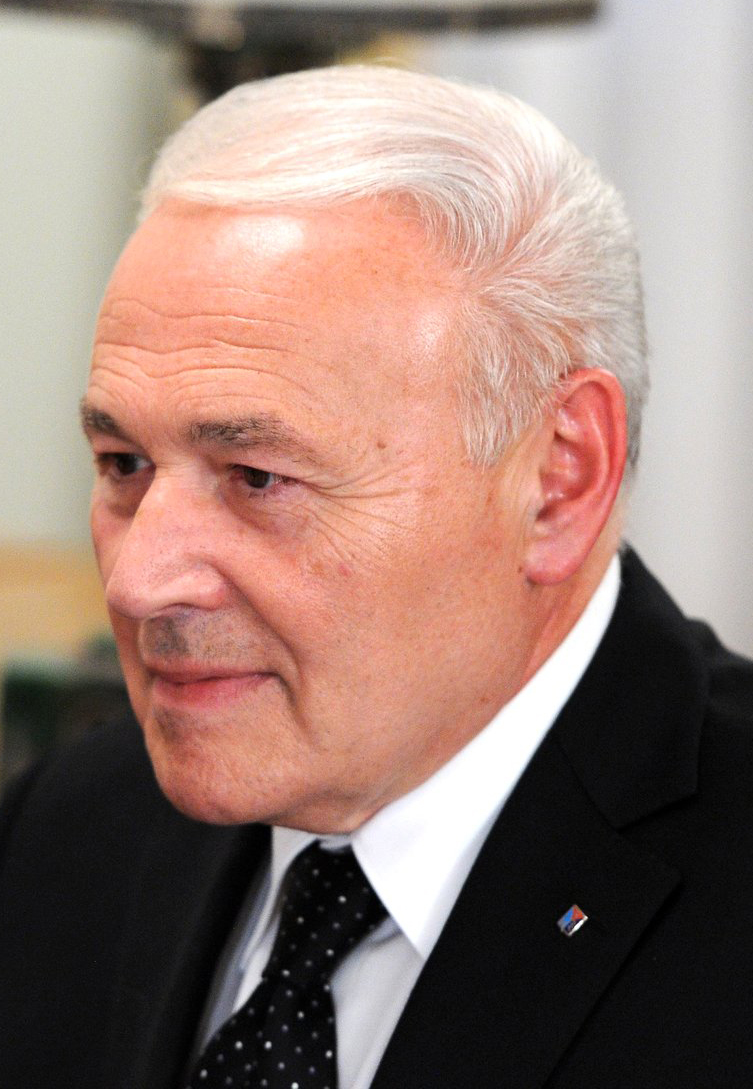
- Pechyony in 2015

4th Governor of Magadan Oblast
- In office 18 September 2013 – 28 May 2018
- Preceded by: Nikolay Dudov
- Succeeded by: Sergey Nosov

Governor of Magadan Oblast (acting)
- In office 3 February 2013 – 18 September 2013

Mayor of Magadan
- In office 10 October 2004 – 3 February 2013
- Preceded by: Nikolay Karpenko
- Succeeded by: Sergey Abramov

Mayor of Magadan (acting)
- In office July 2004 – 10 October 2004

Personal details
- Born: Vladimir Petrovich Pechyony; 20 June 1949 (age 76) Chernivtsi, Ukraine, Soviet Union
- Party: United Russia

Vladimir Petrovich Pechyony (Russian: Владимир Петрович Печёный; born 20 June 1949), is a Ukrainian-born Russian statesman, who had served as the 4th governor of Magadan Oblast from 2013 to 2018.

Pechyony had also served as the mayor of Magadan from 2004 to 2013.

He is a member of the General Council of the United Russia party since 2012, and has been a member of the party since its inception.

== Biography ==
Vladimir Pechyony was born on 20 June 1949 in the city of Chernivtsi, Ukraine.

In 1974 he graduated from the Faculty of Philology of the Chernivtsi State University (now Chernivtsi National University named after Yuriy Fedkovich). He began his career while still a student, since 1969 working as a literary employee in the editorial office of the newspaper "Radyanske Zhittya" in the city of Kitsman, Chernivtsi region. He worked as deputy director of the regional philharmonic society, then as deputy director for the educational part of the vocational school.

From 1978 to 1984, he worked at the Novo-Ustyinsky secondary school in the Khabarovsk Krai, where he taught literature and Russian, and at the same time served as deputy director. In addition, for some time Pechyony headed a boarding school in the village of Okhotsk.

From 1984 to 1990, he worked as a deputy director of a secondary school, as an inspector and deputy head of the city department of public education in Magadan.

In April 1990, Vladimir Pecheyony was approved by the Magadan City Council of People's Deputies as deputy chairman of the Magadan City Executive Committee.

In 1993, Pechyony was appointed deputy head of the administration of Magadan, and in 1997, after the introduction of the position of "mayor of the city" – the first deputy mayor of Magadan. From July to October 2004, he served as the acting mayor of Magadan.

On 10 October 2004, Pechyony was elected mayor of Magadan. After the expiration of his first term of office, in 2008, he again ran for the post of mayor of that city, and won first place, gaining 85.9% of the vote.

On 3 February 2013, Russian President Vladimir Putin appointed Pechyony as the acting governor of the Magadan Oblast, in connection with the resignation of Nikolay Dudov. The very next day, having taken office, Pecheyony dismissed the regional government. He also announced that he intends to run for the post of governor of the Magadan Oblast, whose elections will be held in September 2013. In the elections, with a turnout of 32.28%, Pechyony won with a score of 73.11% of the vote. About 15% of voters voted for the candidate from the Communist Party of the Russian Federation, Sergey Ivanitsky, 6.5% for Aleksandr Plotnikov (LDPR), and 4.5% for Eduard Schubert (A Just Russia). The inauguration of Pechyony took place on 18 September 2013.

From 9 April to 25 October 2014 and from 26 May to 22 November 2017, he was a memberof the Presidium of the State Council of Russia.

Pechyony was released from the post of governor ahead of schedule at his own request on 28 May 2018.

=== Criminal defamation case ===
In 2016, a criminal case was initiated against a resident of Magadan, who criticized Governor Pechyony during a public inspection of the quality of houses built. Magadan was accused of slander against Pechyony (Part 2 of Article 128.1 of the Criminal Code of the Russian Federation). It is noteworthy that the criminal case was initiated not by the body of inquiry, but by the Investigative Committee, and it was submitted for consideration to the department for especially important cases. It is noteworthy that in Russia such cases are referred by law not to the Investigative Committee, but to the bodies of inquiry – local departments of internal affairs.

== Other activities ==
He was the president of the Boxing Federation of the Magadan Oblast
