= Anatoly Shirokov =

Russian politician (born 1967)

- Анатолий Широков
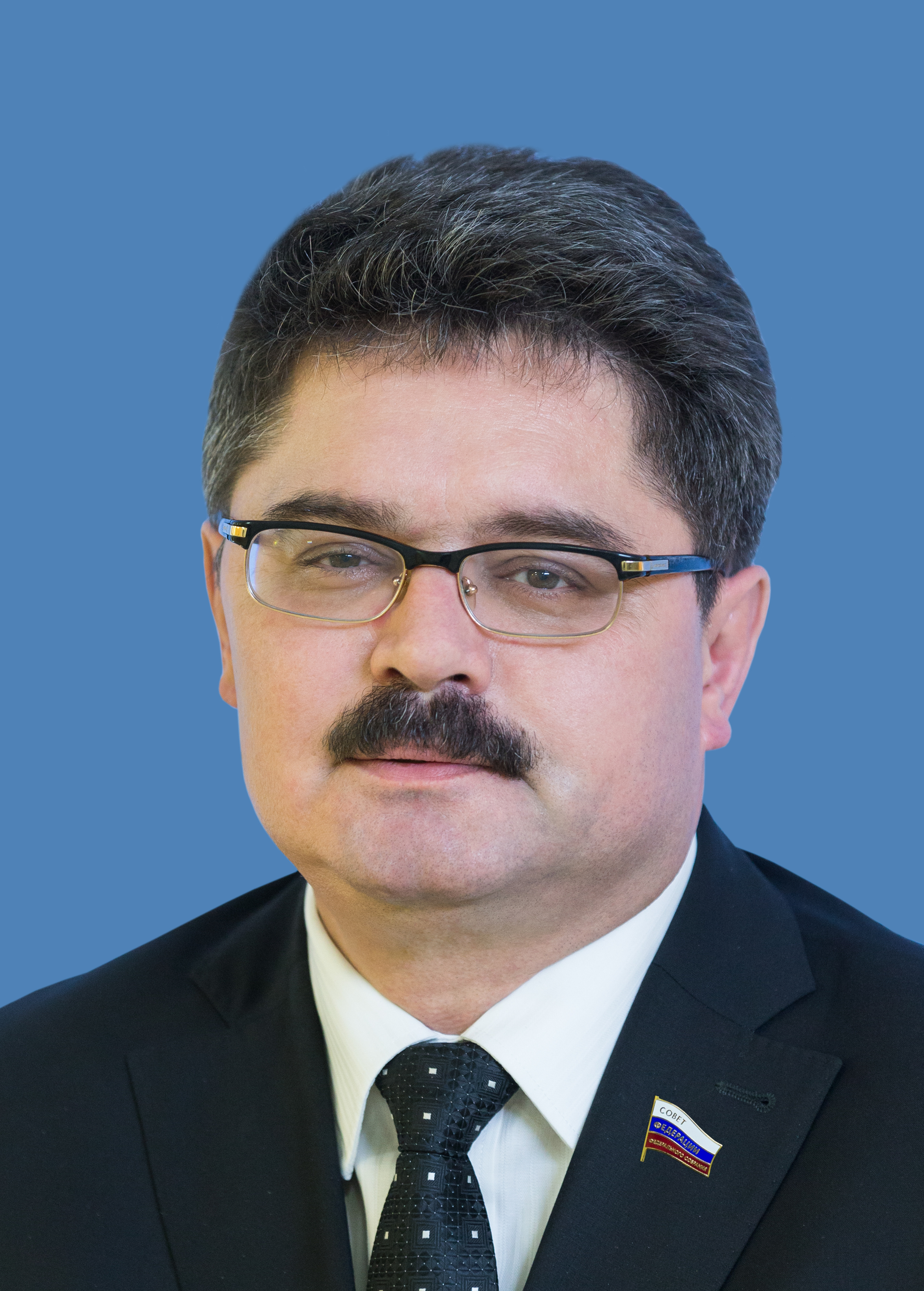

Senator from Magadan Oblast
- Incumbent
- Assumed office 10 October 2014
- Preceded by: Vladimir Kulakov

Personal details
- Born: Anatoly Shirokov; 29 December 1967 (age 58) Novosibirsk, Russian Soviet Federative Socialist Republic, Soviet Union
- Party: United Russia
- Education: Tomsk State University

Anatoly Ivanovich Shirokov (Russian: Анатолий Иванович Широков; born 29 December 1967) is a Russian politician serving as a senator from Magadan Oblast since 10 October 2014.

== Career ==
Anatoly Shirokov was born on 29 December 1967 in Novosibirsk. In 1990, he graduated from the Tomsk State University. After graduation, he continued working in the Tomsk State University. In 1992, he moved to Magadan. Shirokov continued working as an assistant and docent at the Northeastern State University. The same year, he got enrolled to the graduate school of the International Pedagogical University. In 2003, Shirokov became a member of the United Russia party. In 2006, he was appointed the Rector of Northern International University. From 2009 to 2014, he was the deputy of the Magadan Oblast Duma of the 4th and 5th convocations. On 10 October 2014, he became the senator from Magadan Oblast.

== Sanctions ==
Anatoly Shirokov is under personal sanctions introduced by the European Union, the United Kingdom, the United States, Canada, Switzerland, Australia, Ukraine, New Zealand, for ratifying the decisions of the "Treaty of Friendship, Cooperation and Mutual Assistance between the Russian Federation and the Donetsk People's Republic and between the Russian Federation and the Luhansk People's Republic" and providing political and economic support for Russia's annexation of Ukrainian territories.
