= Sergey Abramov (politician, born 1957) =

Russian politician

- Сергей Абрамов
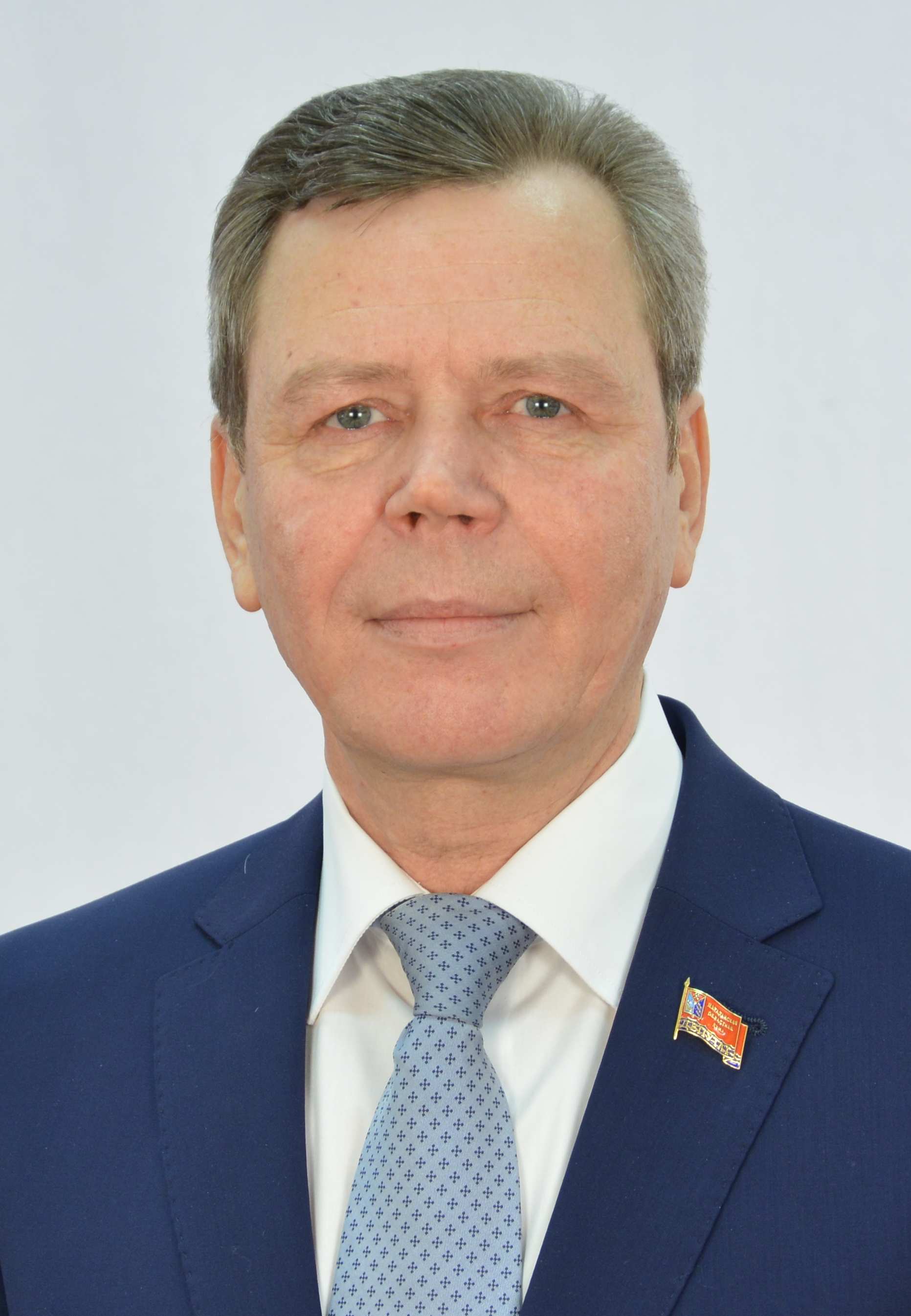

Chairman of the Magadan Oblast Duma
- Incumbent
- Assumed office 28 September 2015

Mayor of Magadan
- In office 11 June 2013 – 28 September 2015
- Preceded by: Vladimir Pechyony
- Succeeded by: Yury Grishan

Mayor of Magadan (acting)
- In office 3 February 2013 – 11 June 2013

Personal details
- Born: Sergey Vasilyevich Abramov; 29 January 1957 (age 69) Arzamas, Russia, Soviet Union
- Party: United Russia

Sergey Vasilyevich Abramov (Russian: Сергей Васильевич Абрамов; born on 29 January 1957), is a Russian politician and statesman, who is currently the chairman of the Magadan Oblast Duma since 28 September 2015.

He had served as the mayor of Magadan from 2013 to 2015.

== Biography ==
Sergey Abramov was born Arzamas on 29 January 1957.

In 1974, he got a job at his first job as a mechanic at the Arzamas Instrument-Making Plant named after the 50th anniversary of Soviet Union. In 1975 he was called up for service in the Soviet Army, and was transferred to the reserve in 1977.

From 1977 to 1982, he studied at the full-time department at the Arzamas State Pedagogical Institute. A.P. Gaidar, qualified as a "teacher of chemistry and biology". He has two higher educations, graduating from the Arzamas State Pedagogical Institute. A.P. Gaidar in 1982, and has received the qualification of "Teacher of Chemistry and Biology".

In 1982, he got a job as a teacher of chemistry and biology in secondary school No. 17 in Magadan, later he was appointed to the position of deputy director for educational work in secondary school No. 17 in Magadan.

From 1988 to 1991, he worked as the director of secondary school No. 27 in the city of Magadan.

From 1991 to 1994, he worked as Deputy Chairman of the Magadan City Council of People's Deputies.

In January 1994, he was appointed chairman of the Property Fund of Magadan. In the same month, he was transferred to the position of manager of affairs of the administration of Magadan, and in July 1994 he was appointed deputy head - manager of affairs of the administration of Magadan.

After completing his studies in 1996 at the Russian Academy of Public Administration under the President of Russia, he received the qualification of "economist-manager".

Between 1997 and July 2011, he worked as Deputy Mayor of Magadan. In 2007, he is a member of the "United Russia" party, and has led the Magadan regional public reception of the chairman of the party, Dmitry Medvedev.

In July 2011, he was transferred to the post of First Deputy Mayor of Magadan.

On 3 February 2013, Abromov became the acting mayor of Magadan. On 11 June, by decision of the Magadan City Duma, Abramov was appointed mayor of Magadan.

In September 2015, Abramov participated in the elections of deputies of the Magadan Oblast Duma in a single constituency from the United Russia political party. He won the elections, and became a member of the parliament. At the first meeting, on 28 September 2015, Abramov was elected chairman of the Magadan Oblast Duma, and also headed the committee on economic development, budget and taxes.

== Awards ==
- Medal "For the Development of Siberia and the Far East" (6 September 2024) — for active legislative work and many years of dedicated service.
- Badge of honor “80 Years of the Liberation of the Gomel Region from the Nazi Invaders” (Gomel, 3 July 2024).
