= Sergey Nosov =

Russian politician (born 1961)

- Сергей Носов
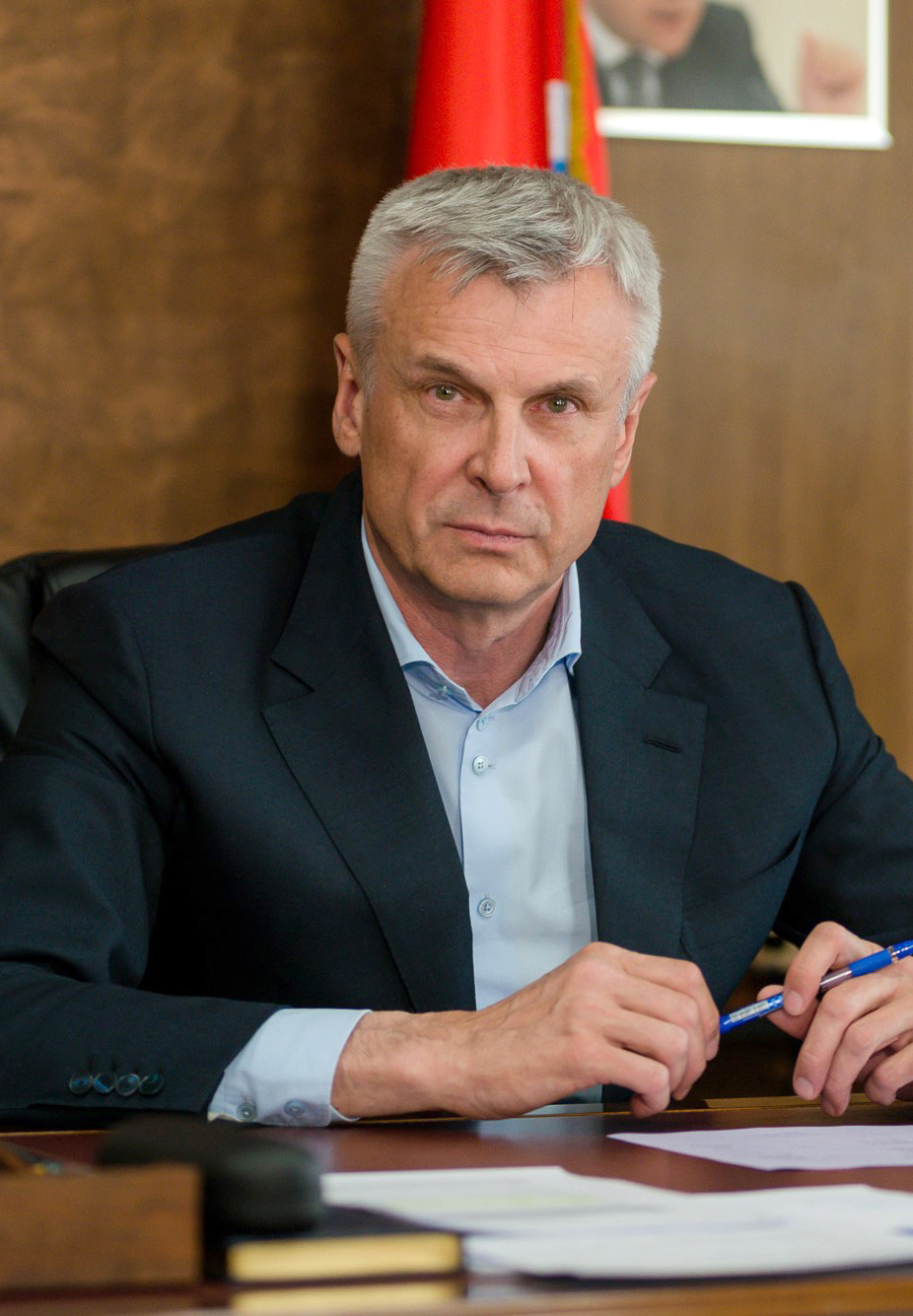
- Nosov in 2022

5th Governor of Magadan Oblast
- Incumbent
- Assumed office 13 September 2018
- Preceded by: Vladimir Pechyony

Governor of Magadan Oblast (acting)
- In office 28 May 2018 – 13 September 2018

Head of Nizhny Tagil
- In office 17 October 2012 – 28 May 2018
- Preceded by: Valentina Isayeva
- Succeeded by: Vladislav Pinayev

Vice Governor of Sverdlovsk Oblast
- In office 11 July 2012 – 15 October 2012

Personal details
- Born: Sergey Konstantinovich Nosov; 17 February 1961 (age 65) Magnitogorsk, Russia, Soviet Union
- Citizenship: Russian
- Party: United Russia
- Education: Magnitogorsk Mining and Metallurgical Institute; RANEPA

Sergey Konstantinovich Nosov (Russian: Сергей Константинович Носов; born 17 February 1961) is a Russian politician currently serving as the 5th Governor of Magadan Oblast since 13 September 2018.

He was a member of the Presidium of the State Council of Russia from 28 January to 2 August 2019, and again since 21 December 2020.

He is a member of the Supreme Council of the United Russia party.

He was the mayor of Nizhny Tagil from 2012 to 2018, the Vice-Governor of Sverdlovsk Oblast from July to October 2012, and was the General Director of the Nizhny Tagil Metallurgical Plant from 1999 to 2005.

== Biography ==
Sergey Nosov was born on 17 February 1961 in Magnitogorsk, and is a member of the metallurgical dynasty of the Nosov family. His father, Konstantin Grigoriyevich, had owned a number of metallurgical enterprises in Ukraine. His grandfather was Grigory Ivanovich.

Nosov studied well at school, actively participated in Olympiads, showed good results in physics and mathematics. In high school, he was invited to the physics and mathematics boarding school at Moscow State University, but he chose the Magnitogorsk Mining and Metallurgical Institute, named after his grandfather. He studied well, and was a Lenin scholar.

In 1983, he graduated with honors from the Magnitogorsk Mining and Metallurgical Institute the specialty "Metallurgy of ferrous metals" with the qualification "engineer-metallurgist".

He began work in production. He was an assistant of a steelmaker, a production foreman of furnaces, was the deputy head of the shop.

In 1989, he was the head of the Oxygen Converter Shop at MMK. In 1994, he was the Head of Department, then promoted to the Deputy General Director of MMK for Production and Investments. He was a member of the board of directors of MMK.

In 1995, he graduated from the Academy of National Economy of Russia under the Government of Russia, with the qualification "Manager of the highest category".

In December 1998, he left MMK due to a conflict with the team of General Director, Viktor Rashnikov, and moved to Nizhny Tagil, becoming the First Deputy General Director of the Nizhny Tagil Metallurgical Plant (NTMK). A few months later, he was appointed general director of the plant. In October 2002, he was the managing director. He was also vice-president of Evraz-holding LLC, the main shareholder of the plant. He took part in the management of other enterprises: he was a member of the boards of directors of Vysokogorsky GOK, Tagilbank, Seversky Pipe Plant, from 2002 to 2003, where he concurrently was the managing director of the West-Siberian Metal Plant (Novokuznetsk).

In 2000 and 2004, Nosov was elected as a deputy of the House of Representatives of the Legislative Assembly of Sverdlovsk Oblast from the Lenin constituency No. 17 in Nizhny Tagil. Nosov is one of the founders of the Sverdlovsk regional branch of the United Russia party, where he served as secretary of the political council.

In 2002, Nosov took part in the elections to the Regional Duma of the Legislative Assembly of Sverdlovsk Oblast, heading the list of the Unity and Fatherland movement, in connection with which he found himself in a state of conflict with the regional governor Eduard Rossel, in which case the list of the movement was not agreed with the governor, his supporters took in the list there are deliberately "impassable" places. As a result, the party's list in the elections took second place, yielding to the pro-governor's bloc "For the native Urals", Nosov refused the deputy mandate, but since then he has been considered by experts and the media as a possible candidate for the post of Governor of Sverdlovsk Oblast.

In 2004, Nosov again took part in the elections to the Oblast Duma, was number two on the United Russia list led by Rossel. He again refused the mandate received as a result of the elections, since he was elected to the House of Representatives of the Legislative Assembly of Sverdlovsk Oblast.

In January 2005, Nosov resigned from the post of Managing Director of NTMK, retaining the post of Vice President of Evraz-Holding. In April 2005, he resigned from the mandate of a State Duma deputy, who was freed after the transfer of United Russia party member, Nikolay Tabachkov, who was elected in 2003 from the Sverdlovsk regional group of the party list, and to the post of auditor of the Accounts Chamber of Russia. A few months later, Nosov left Evraz-Holding and was out of sight of the media for a year.

In 2005, he leaves the post of Managing Director of the Nizhniy Tagil Metallurgical Plant and becomes Vice President for Technical Policy of Evrazholding, the main shareholder of NTMK.

In August 2006, he was appointed General Director of CJSC Russpetsstal, a new holding company owned by Rosoboronexport (now the state corporation Rostec), under whose management the Stupino Metallurgical Plant and the Krasny Oktyabr Plant in Volgograd, and was engaged in the production of alloys for the defense industry. October 2006, he was the President of CJSC RusSpetsStal. In 2007, he was an advisor at the state corporation "Russian Technologies".

On 11 July 2012, Nosov appointed Vice Governor of Sverdlovsk Oblast under Yevgeny Kuyvashev.

On 26 July 2012, Nosov won the primaries of United Russia for the election of a candidate for the mayor of Nizhny Tagil, having received the support of 817 people out of 946 who voted.

On 14 October 2012, he won the elections for the Head of the city of Nizhny Tagil, gaining 92% of the votes.

On 15 October 2012, he wrote a letter of resignation of his own free will from the post of vice-governor of the Sverdlovsk Oblast in connection with the election to the post of the Head of Nizhny Tagil.

On 17 October 2012, Nosov's inauguration of the head of Nizhny Tagil took place.

On 6 February 2016, he was elected to the governing body of the United Russia party, under the Supreme Council.

On March 24, 2017, the Minister of Industry and Trade Denis Manturov announced that the international arms exhibition Russia Arms Expo, which has been held every two years since 1999, near Nizhny Tagil, has been moved to the Patriot Park near Moscow since 2017. Having learned about this, Nosov said that the transfer of the exhibition was not a tragedy, although this decision can only be regretted. The member of the Federation Council, Rossel, who played a key role in the creation of the exhibition, strongly opposed its transfer, calling it a blow to the heart.

Rossel asked Nosov to talk with Manturov, but Nosov refused, saying that it would be a violation of chain of command to address the federal minister over the head of the regional authorities.

The administration of Nizhny Tagil resisted the part of the public that tried to organize protests against the transfer of the exhibition. On 31 March 2017, the head of the Tankopedia project, Aleksey Khlopotov, applied to hold a rally on 15 April of the same year in Nizhny Tagil against the transfer of the exhibition. However, after a conversation with an official of the Nizhny Tagil administration, the application was withdrawn. According to Khlopotov, the law enforcement agencies received information about possible provocations at a rally after anti-corruption protests that took place in Russian cities, including Nizhny Tagil, on 26 March 2017. Earlier, activists were banned from holding briefings on the territory of municipal facilities in Nizhny Tagil with reference to the decision of the city authorities.

=== Governor of Magadan Oblast ===
By the decree of Russian President Vladimir Putin on 28 May 2018, Nosov was appointed acting Governor of Magadan Oblast.

On 9 September 2018, Nosov won the election of the governor of the Magadan Oblast, gaining 81.59% of the vote. On 13 September, he took office as governor.

From 28 January to 2 August 2019, and from 21 December 2020, he is a Member of the Presidium of the State Council of Russia.

According to the Rating Center for Information Communications, which compiled the National Rating of Governors for March–April 2019, based on a survey and questioning of a large number of experts, analysts and political scientists, Nosov entered the top ten governors of the country.
