= Magadan Oblast Duma =

Regional parliament of Magadan Oblast, Russia

Magadan Oblast Duma Магаданская областная дума
- 8th legislature

Type
- Type: Unicameral

Leadership
- Chairman: Sergey Abramov, United Russia since 18 September 2015

Structure
- Seats: 21
- Political groups: United Russia (17) CPRF (1); LDPR (1) A Just Russia (1)

Elections
- Voting system: Mixed
- Last election: 12-14 September 2025
- Next election: 2030

Website
- www.magoblduma.ru

The Magadan Oblast Duma (Russian: Магаданская областная дума) is the regional parliament of Magadan Oblast, a federal subject of Russia. A total of 21 representatives are elected for a five-year terms, with 11 of them by party list and 10 by constituency. The parliament's seat is in the city of Magadan.

== Elections ==
=== 2020 ===
Party	%	Seats
United Russia	58.32	16
Liberal Democratic Party of Russia	11.61	2
Communist Party of the Russian Federation	10.31	1
A Just Russia	7.25	2
Russian Party of Pensioners for Social Justice	4.79	0
For Truth	1.79	0
Communists of Russia	1.77	0
Registered voters/turnout	37.17	

=== 2025 ===
Party	%	Seats
United Russia	65.89	17
Liberal Democratic Party of Russia	12.83	1
Communist Party of the Russian Federation	8.40	1
A Just Russia	5.22	1
New People	5.07	1
Invalid ballots	2.60	
Registered voters/turnout	41.64	

== List of chairmen ==
Convocation	Name	In office
1st Convocation	Piotr Lisetsky	1994 – 1997
2nd Convocation	Vladimir Pekhtin; Ilya Rosenblum	1997-2000; 2000 – 2001
3rd Convocation	Sergey Mazarin; Stanislav Eliseikin; Alexander Alexandrov	2001 – 2002; 2002 – 2003; 2003 – 2005
4th Convocation	Alexander Alexandrov	2005 – 2010
5th Convocation	Alexander Alexandrov	2010 – 2015
6th Convocation	Sergey Abramov	2015 – 2020
7th Convocation	Sergey Abramov	2020 – present

== Sources ==
- Duma website
